= Lucius Roscius Aelianus Maecius Celer =

Roman senator

Lucius Roscius Aelianus Maecius Celer was a Roman senator of the second century. He was suffect consul in the nundinium of November-December AD 100 with Tiberius Claudius Sacerdos Julianus as his colleague. Celer is primarily known from inscriptions.

The origins of Maecius Celer have attracted some discussion. The fact that the final elements of our man's name are shared with the consul of 101, Marcus Maecius Celer, have led some experts to suggest the two men are brothers and our Maecius Celer had been adopted by a Roscius. However Olli Salomies endorses Ronald Syme's hypothesis that his filiation M.f. refers to a Marcus Roscius, namely Marcus Roscius Coelius, consul in 81, who married an aunt of the consul of 101, and this was the source of the last two name elements; instead of brothers, the two Maecii Celeres are cousins.

Lucius Roscius L.[f. Qui. Paculus Mae]cius Celer M[...] Postumus Mam[ilianus? ...] Vergilius Staberia[nus ...], quaestor to the emperor Hadrian, is likely the son or grandson of this Maecius Celer.

== Career ==
Celer's cursus honorum is partially known from an inscription set up at Tibur by his friend, Gaius Vecilius Probus; Anthony Birley notes that "Vecilius Probus gave only a selection of posts on the Tibur inscription. Otherwise, it would certainly be curious that he held a relatively early consulship, with no appointments in the imperial service to his credit." According to Probus, Celer's career began as one of the decemviri stlitibus iudicandis, one of the four boards of the vigintiviri, a preliminary and required first step toward gaining entry into the Roman Senate. Celer was then military tribune in Legio IX Hispana, which was stationed in Roman Britain. During Domitian's Chattan War of 83, two vexillations were sent from Legio IX to Germany, one under Celer, the other under Velius Rufus. For Celer's efforts in the conflict, he was awarded Dona militaria appropriate for his rank. He was admitted to the Senate when he became quaestor for an unnamed emperor, possibly Domitian; this was followed by the traditional republican magistracies of plebeian tribune and praetor. Syme argues the date of his praetorship fell in the years 90 to 94, making him a contemporary of Tacitus. Celer's consulate followed.

The only office Celer is known to have held after his consulate is the proconsular governorship of Africa, which Werner Eck has dated to 117/118. His life after this governorship, as well as the date of his death, is unknown.

Political offices
Preceded by Gaius Julius Cornutus Tertullus, and Gaius Plinius Caecilius Secundus as suffect consuls	Suffect consul of the Roman Empire; 100 with Tiberius Claudius Sacerdos Julianus	Succeeded by Imp. Caesar Nerva Trajanus Augustus IV, and Quintus Articuleius Paetus II as ordinary consuls
