= Trajan =

Roman emperor from AD 98 to 117

- Optimus Princeps
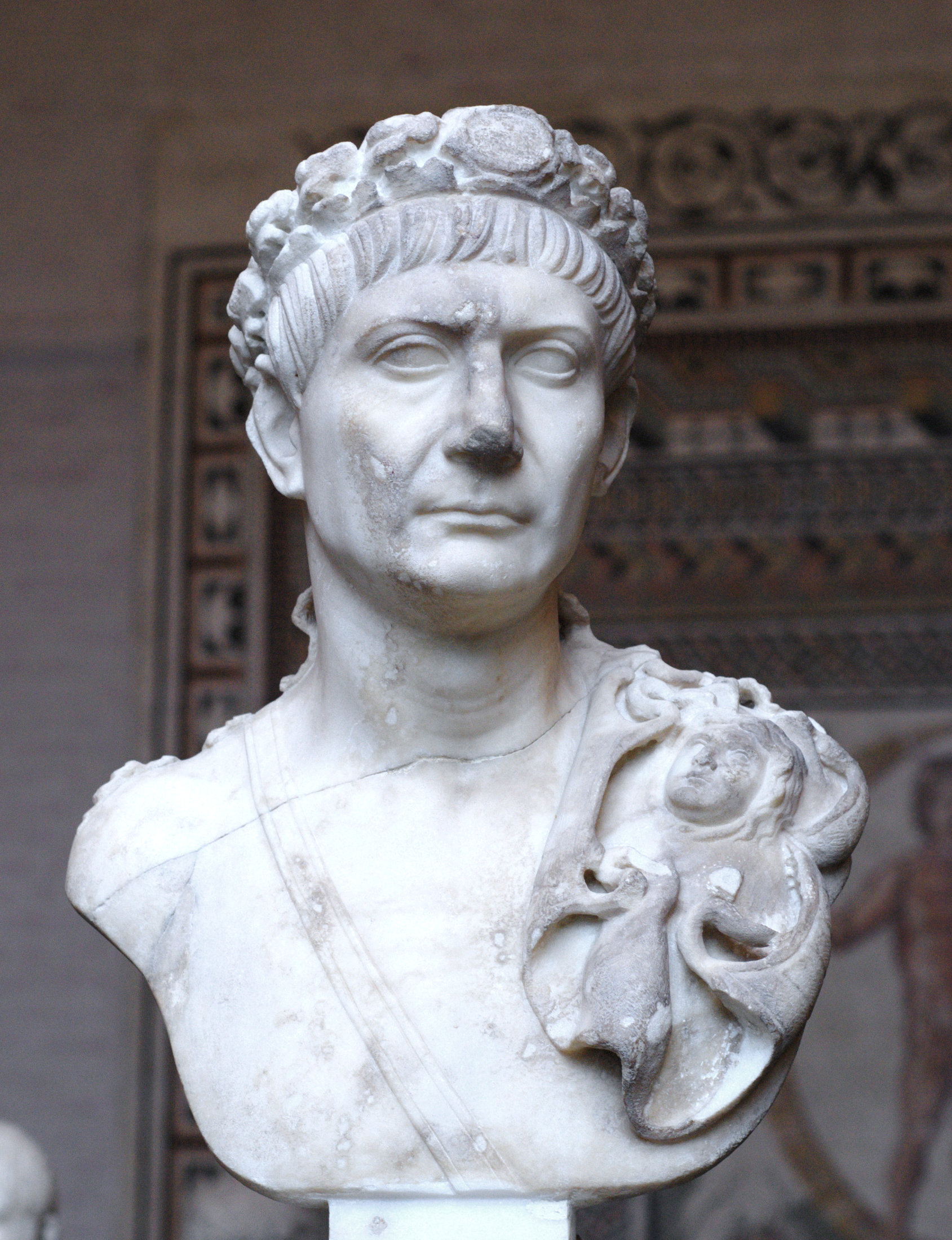
- Marble bust, Glyptothek, Munich

Roman emperor
- Reign: 28 January 98 – 9 August 117
- Predecessor: Nerva
- Successor: Hadrian
- Born: Marcus Ulpius Traianus; 18 September 53; Italica, Hispania Baetica, Roman Empire (present-day Spain)
- Died: c. 9 August 117 (aged 63); Selinus, Cilicia, Roman Empire (present-day Turkey)
- Burial: Rome, in the Trajan's Column, part of Trajan's Forum
- Spouse: Pompeia Plotina
- Issue: Hadrian (adoptive)
Names
- Marcus Ulpius Nerva Traianus (AD 97)
Regnal name
- Imperator Caesar Nerva Traianus Augustus
- Dynasty: Nerva–Antonine
- Father: Marcus Ulpius Traianus; Nerva (adoptive)
- Mother: Marcia
- Religion: Ancient Roman religion

Trajan (/ˈtreɪ.dʒən/ TRAY-jən; born Marcus Ulpius Traianus, 18 September 53 – c. 9 August 117) was the Roman emperor from 98 to 117, remembered as the second of the Five Good Emperors of the Nerva–Antonine dynasty. He was a philanthropic ruler and a successful soldier-emperor who presided over one of the greatest military expansions in Roman history, during which, by the time of his death, the Roman Empire reached its maximum territorial extent. He was given the title of optimus princeps ('the best ruler') by the Roman Senate.

Trajan was born in the municipium of Italica in the present-day Andalusian province of Seville in southern Spain, an Italic settlement in Hispania Baetica; his gens Ulpia came from the town of Tuder in the Umbria region of central Italy. His namesake father, Marcus Ulpius Traianus, was a general and distinguished senator. Trajan rose to prominence during the reign of Domitian; in AD 89, serving as a legatus legionis in Hispania Tarraconensis, he supported the emperor against a revolt on the Rhine led by Antonius Saturninus. He then served as governor of Germania and Pannonia. In September 96, Domitian was succeeded by the elderly and childless Nerva, who proved to be unpopular with the army. After a revolt by members of the Praetorian Guard, Nerva decided to adopt as his heir and successor the more popular Trajan, who had distinguished himself in military campaigns against Germanic tribes.

As emperor of Rome, Trajan oversaw the construction of building projects such as the forum named after him, the expansion of social welfare policies such as the alimenta, and new military conquests. He annexed Nabataea and Dacia, and his war against the Parthian Empire ended with the incorporation of Armenia, Mesopotamia, and Assyria as Roman provinces. In August AD 117, while sailing back to Rome, Trajan fell ill and died of a stroke in the city of Selinus. He was deified by the senate and his successor Hadrian, Trajan's cousin. According to historical tradition, Trajan's ashes were entombed in a small room beneath Trajan's Column.

== Sources ==
An account of the Dacian Wars, the Commentarii de Bellis Dacicis, written by Trajan himself or a ghostwriter and modelled after Caesar's Commentarii de Bello Gallico, is lost with the exception of one sentence. Only fragments remain of the Getica, a book by Trajan's personal physician Titus Statilius Criton. The Parthica, a 17-volume account of the Parthian Wars written by Arrian, has met a similar fate. Book 68 in Greek author Cassius Dio's Roman History, which survives mostly as Byzantine abridgements and epitomes, is the main source for the political history of Trajan's rule. Besides this, Pliny the Younger's Panegyricus and Dio Chrysostom's orations are the best surviving contemporary sources. Both are adulatory perorations, typical of the High Imperial period, that describe an idealized monarch and an equally idealized view of Trajan's rule, and concern themselves more with ideology than with fact.

The 10th volume of Pliny's letters contains his correspondence with Trajan, which deals with various aspects of imperial Roman government. It is generally agreed that Pliny, being part of the emperor's inner circle, provides a unique and valuable source of information through his letters with Trajan, the only surviving correspondence between a governor and his emperor. However, it has been argued that Pliny's correspondence with Trajan is neither intimate nor candid, but rather an exchange of official mail in which Pliny's stance borders on the servile. Some authors have even proposed that much of the text was written and/or edited by Trajan's Imperial secretary, his ab epistulis. Given the scarcity of literary sources, discussion of Trajan and his rule in modern historiography cannot avoid speculation. Non-literary sources such as archaeology, epigraphy, and numismatics are also useful for reconstructing his reign.

== Early life ==
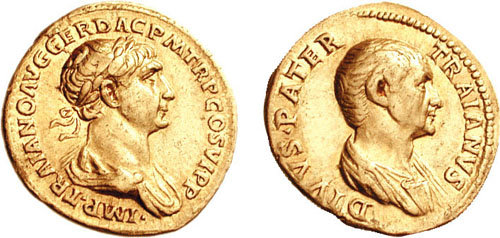
A gold aureus of Trajan depicting him alongside his namesake father, c. AD 115

Marcus Ulpius Traianus was born on 18 September AD 53 in the Roman province of Hispania Baetica (in what is now Andalusia in modern Spain), in the municipium of Italica (now in the municipal area of Santiponce, in the outskirts of Seville), a Roman colony established in 206 BC by Scipio Africanus. At the time of Trajan's birth it was a small town, without baths, theatre and amphitheatre, and with a very narrow territory under its direct administration. Trajan's year of birth is really not reliably attested and may instead have been AD 56.

The epitome of Cassius Dio's Roman history describes Trajan as "an Iberian and neither an Italian nor even an Italiote", but this claim is contradicted by other ancient sources and rejected by modern scholars, who have reconstructed Trajan's Italic lineage. (Note: Bennett 2001, pp. 1–3 "Cassius Dio, himself of provincial origin, had little respect for the phylogeny of the emperor Trajan, observing with barely disguised contempt that he was 'an Iberian, and neither an Italian nor even an Italiote'. In fact, one ancient account derives Trajan's paternal family, the gens Ulpia, from Tuder, on the northern border of ancient Umbria, an area where the clan is independently recorded... Traius, like Ulpius, while not especially common, occurs with some frequency in northern Italy, notably at Tuder and at the nearby municipality of Ameria, the probable origo of Trajan's mother, strengthening the possibility of close family ties with the region... an Italian pedigree for the gens Ulpia seems certain... his family had settled at Italica (Santiponce) in southern Spain, a few miles east of modern Seville. ... strictly speaking, Trajan was an Hispaniensis, an Italian domiciled or born in Spain, as opposed to an Hispanus....") (Note: Canto (2003) argued that the Traii ancestors of Trajan were his paternal family and indigenous Iberian Turdetani rather than Italic settlers, but this view departs from the prevailing view in academia. However, Canto's theory is rejected by Caballos Rufino (2013)) Appian states that Trajan's hometown of Italica was settled by and named after Italic veterans who fought in Spain under Scipio, and new settlers arrived there from Italy in the following centuries. Among the Italic settlers were the Ulpii and the Traii, who were either part of the original colonists or arrived as late as the end of the 1st century BC. Their original home, according to the description of Trajan as "Ulpius Traianus ex urbe Tudertina" in the Epitome de Caesaribus, was the town of Tuder (Todi) in the Umbria region of central Italy. This is confirmed by archeology, with epigraphic evidence placing both the Ulpii and the Traii in Umbria generally and Tuder specifically, and by linguistic studies of the family names Ulpius and Traius which show that both are of Osco-Umbrian origin.

It is unknown whether Trajan's ancestors were Roman citizens or not at their arrival in Spain. They would have certainly possessed Roman citizenship in case they arrived after the Social War (91–87 BC), when Tuder became a municipium of Roman citizens. In Spain they may well have intermarried with native Iberians, in which case they would have lost their citizenship. Had they lacked or lost the status of Roman citizens, they would have achieved it or recovered it when Italica became a municipium with Latin rights in the mid-1st century BC.

Trajan's paternal grandfather Ulpius married a Traia. Their son, Trajan's namesake and father Marcus Ulpius Traianus, was born at Italica during the reign of Tiberius and became a prominent senator and general, commanding the Legio X Fretensis under Vespasian in the First Jewish-Roman War. Trajan's mother was Marcia, a Roman noblewoman of the gens Marcia and a sister-in-law of the second Flavian Emperor Titus. Little is known of her. Her father is believed to be Quintus Marcius Barea Sura. Her mother was Antonia Furnilla, daughter of Aulus Antonius Rufus and Furnia. Trajan owned some lands called Figlinae Marcianae in Ameria, another Umbrian town, located near both Tuder and Reate (the home of the Flavian dynasty) and believed to be the home of Marcia's family.

The line of the Ulpii continued long after Trajan's death. His elder sister was Ulpia Marciana, and his niece was Salonia Matidia. Very little is known about Trajan's early formative years, but it is thought likely that he spent his first months or years in Italica before moving to Rome and then, perhaps at around eight or nine years of age, he almost certainly would have returned temporarily to Italica with his father during Trajanus's governorship of Baetica (ca. 64–65). The lack of a strong local power base, caused by the size of the town from which they came, made it necessary for the Ulpii (and for the Aelii, the other important senatorial family of Italica with whom they were allied) to weave local alliances, in the Baetica (with the Annii, the Ucubi and perhaps the Dasumii from Corduba), the Tarraconense and the Narbonense, here above all through Pompeia Plotina, Trajan's wife. Many of these alliances were made not in Spain, but in Rome. The family home in Rome, the Domus Traiana, was on the Aventine Hill. Excavations under the Piazza del Tempio di Diana found remains thought to be of the family's large suburban villa, with evidence of highly decorated rooms.

=== Military career ===
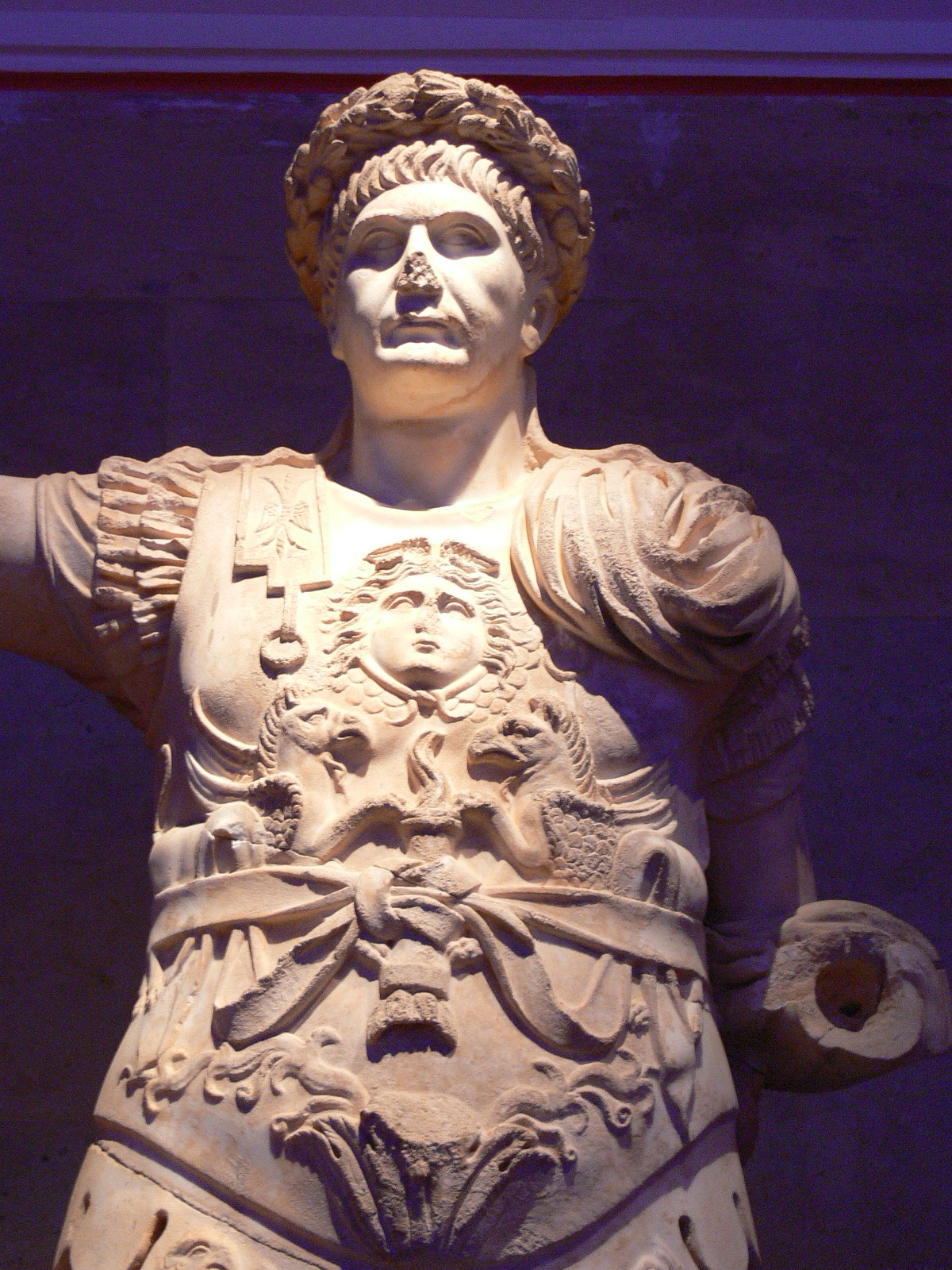
Trajan wearing the civic crown and military garb such as a muscle cuirass, 2nd century AD, Antalya Archaeological Museum

As a young man, Trajan rose through the ranks of the Roman army, serving in some of the most contested parts of the empire's frontier. In 76–77, his father was Governor of Syria (Latin: Legatus pro praetore Syriae), where Trajan himself remained as Tribunus legionis. From there, after his father's replacement, he seems to have been transferred to an unspecified Rhine province, and Pliny implies that he engaged in active combat duty during both commissions.

In about 86, Trajan's cousin Aelius Afer died, leaving his young children Hadrian and Paulina orphans. Trajan and his colleague Publius Acilius Attianus became co-guardians of the two children. Trajan, in his late thirties, was created ordinary consul for the year 91. This early appointment may reflect the prominence of his father's career, as his father had been instrumental to the ascent of the ruling Flavian dynasty, held consular rank himself and had just been made a patrician. Around this time Trajan brought the architect and engineer Apollodorus of Damascus with him to Rome, and married Pompeia Plotina, a noblewoman from the Roman settlement at Nîmes; the marriage ultimately remained childless.

The details of Trajan's early military career are obscure, save for the fact that in 89, as legate of Legio VII Gemina in Hispania Tarraconensis, he supported Domitian against an attempted coup by Lucius Antonius Saturninus, the governor of Germania Superior. Trajan probably remained in the region after the revolt was quashed, to engage with the Chatti who had sided with Saturninus, before returning the VII Gemina legion to Legio in Hispania Tarraconensis. In 91 he held a consulate with Acilius Glabrio, a rarity in that neither consul was a member of the ruling dynasty. He held an unspecified consular commission as governor of either Pannonia or Germania Superior, or possibly both. Pliny – who seems to deliberately avoid offering details that would stress personal attachment between Trajan and the "tyrant" Domitian – attributes to him, at the time, various (and unspecified) feats of arms.

=== Rise to power ===
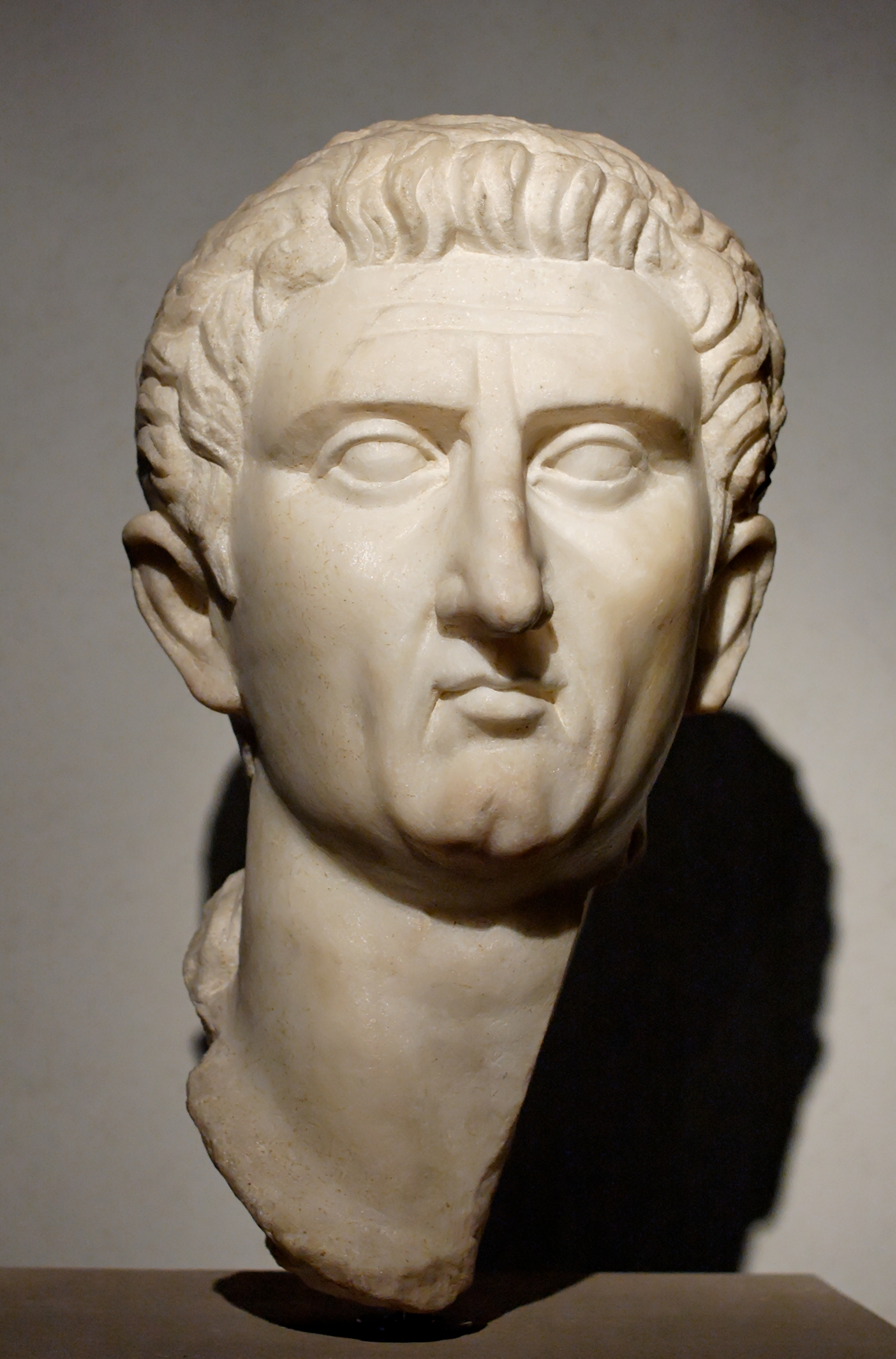
Bust of Nerva, who became emperor following the assassination of Domitian

Domitian's successor, Nerva, was unpopular with the army, and had been forced by his Praetorian Prefect Casperius Aelianus to execute Domitian's killers. Nerva needed the army's support to avoid being ousted. He accomplished this in the summer of 97 by naming Trajan as his adoptive son and successor, claiming that this was entirely due to Trajan's outstanding military merits. There are hints, however, in contemporary literary sources that Trajan's adoption was imposed on Nerva. Pliny implied as much when he wrote that, although an emperor could not be coerced into doing something, if this was the way in which Trajan was raised to power, then it was worth it. Alice König argues that the notion of a natural continuity between Nerva's and Trajan's reigns was an ex post facto fiction developed by authors writing under Trajan, including Tacitus and Pliny.

According to the Historia Augusta, the future Emperor Hadrian brought word to Trajan of his adoption. Trajan retained Hadrian on the Rhine frontier as a military tribune, and Hadrian thus became privy to the circle of friends and relations with whom Trajan surrounded himself. Among them was Lucius Licinius Sura, a Roman senator born in Spain and the governor of Germania Inferior, who was Trajan's personal friend and became an official adviser of the Emperor. Sura was highly influential, and was appointed consul for a third term in 107. (Note: Some sources credit Sura with building a bathhouse on Rome's Aventine Hill, and naming the bathhouse after himself; others claim the bathhouse was named in his honour but built by Trajan. In either case, the association of his name with a public building was a signal honour; most public buildings in the capital were named after members of the imperial family.) (Note: Sura's baths were later enlarged by the third century emperor Decius, to emphasise his link to Trajan.) Some senators may have resented Sura's activities as a kingmaker and éminence grise, among them the historian Tacitus, who acknowledged Sura's military and oratorical talents, but compared his rapacity and devious ways to those of Vespasian's éminence grise Licinius Mucianus. Sura is said to have informed Hadrian in 108 that he had been chosen as Trajan's imperial heir.

As governor of Upper Germany (Germania Superior) during Nerva's reign, Trajan received the prestigious title of Germanicus for his skilful rule of the volatile province. When Nerva died on 28 January 98, Trajan succeeded to the role of emperor without any outward adverse incident. That he chose not to hasten towards Rome, but made a lengthy inspection of the Rhine and Danube frontiers, may suggest he was unsure of his position, in Rome and with the armies at the front. Alternatively, Trajan's military background meant he understood the importance of strengthening the empire's frontiers. His vision for future conquests required the improvement of surveillance networks, defences and transport along the Danube. Prior to his frontier tours, Trajan ordered Praetorian Prefect Aelianus to attend him in Germany, where he was apparently executed forthwith ("put out of the way"), and his now-vacant post taken by Attius Suburanus. Trajan's accession, therefore, could qualify more as a successful coup than an orderly succession.

== Emperor (98 – 117) ==
Trajan's belated ceremonial entry into Rome in 99 was notably understated, something on which Pliny the Younger elaborated; on his entry to Rome, he granted the plebs a direct gift of money. The traditional donative to the troops, however, was reduced by half.

=== The Senate ===
There remained the issue of the strained relations between the emperor and the Senate, especially after the supposed bloodiness that had marked Domitian's reign and his dealings with the Curia. By not openly supporting Domitian's preference for equestrian officers, Trajan appeared to conform to the idea (developed by Pliny) that an emperor derived his legitimacy from his adherence to traditional hierarchies and senatorial morals, and by feigning reluctance to hold power, Trajan was able to start building a consensus around him in the Senate; therefore, he could point to the allegedly republican character of his rule.

In a speech at the inauguration of his third consulship, on 1 January 100, Trajan exhorted the senate to share the care-taking of the empire with him – an event later celebrated on a coin. In reality, Trajan did not share power in any meaningful way with the senate, something that Pliny admits candidly: "[E]verything depends on the whims of a single man who, on behalf of the common welfare, has taken upon himself all functions and all tasks". One of the most significant trends of his reign was his encroachment on the senate's sphere of authority, such as his decision to make the senatorial provinces of Achaea and Bithynia into imperial ones in order to deal with the inordinate spending on public works by local magnates and the general mismanagement of provincial affairs by various proconsuls appointed by the Senate.

=== Optimus princeps ===
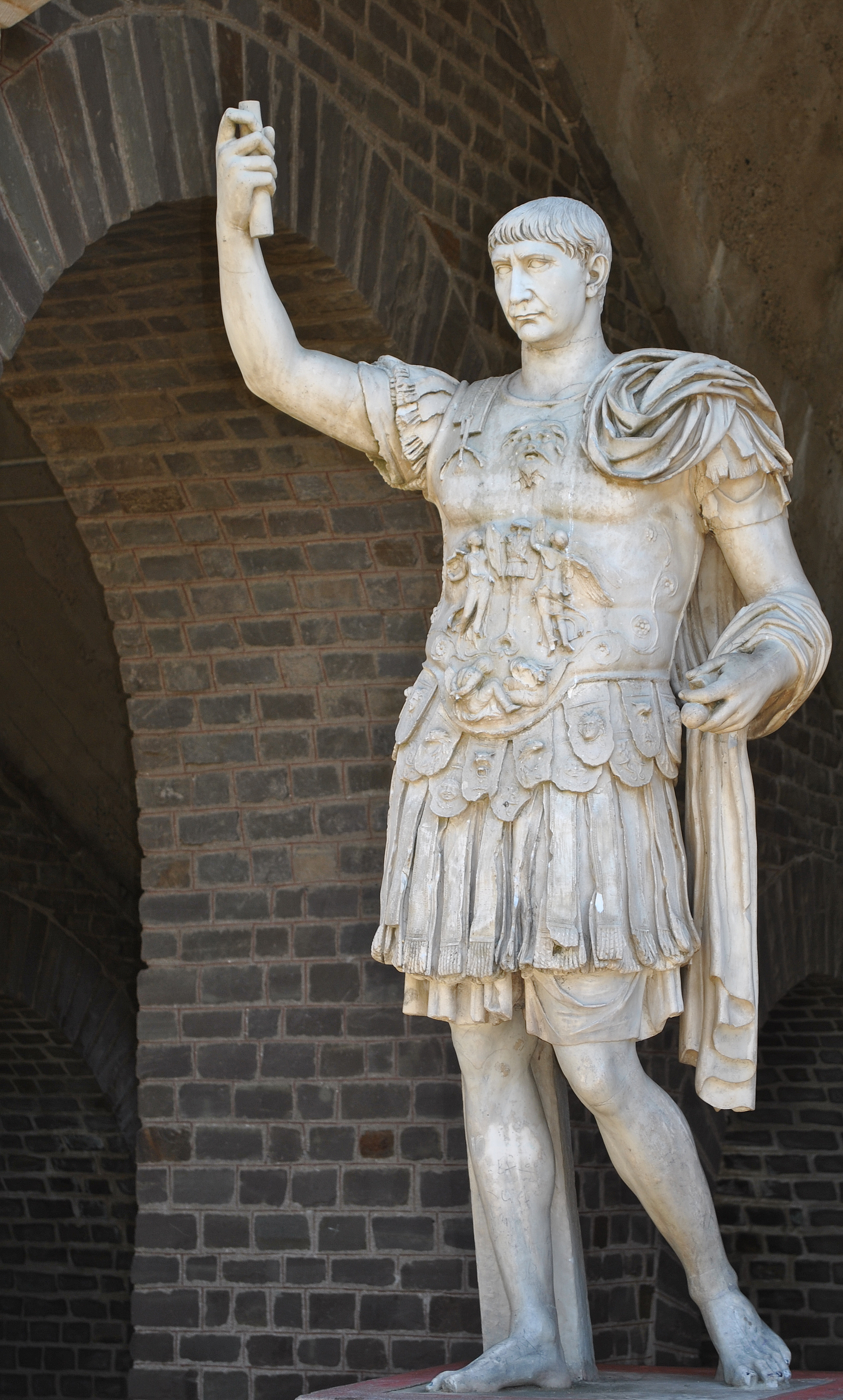
A statue of Trajan, posing in military garb, in front of the Amphitheatre of Colonia Ulpia Traiana in the Xanten Archaeological Park in modern-day Germany

According to the ethics for autocracy developed by most political writers of the Imperial Roman Age, Trajan was a good ruler in that he ruled less by fear, and more by acting as a role model; for example, in the formula developed by Pliny, Trajan was a "good" emperor in that, by himself, he approved or blamed the same things that the Senate would have approved or blamed, and in his words "men learn better from examples". The idea is that Trajan wielded autocratic power through moderatio instead of contumacia – moderation instead of insolence, and if in reality Trajan was an autocrat, his deferential behavior towards his peers qualified him to be viewed as a virtuous monarch.

Eventually, Trajan's popularity among his peers was such that the Roman Senate bestowed upon him the honorific of optimus, meaning "the best", which appears on coins from 105 on. This title had mostly to do with Trajan's role as benefactor, such as in the case of his returning confiscated property. The epithet optimus princeps had already been used for the emperors since the late republic, but Trajan was the only one officially honoured by the title.

Pliny states that Trajan's ideal role was a conservative one, argued as well by the orations of Dio Chrysostom, in particular his four Orations on Kingship, composed early during Trajan's reign. Dio, as a Greek notable and intellectual with friends in high places, and possibly an official friend to the emperor (Latin: amicus caesaris), saw Trajan as a defender of the status quo. In his third kingship oration, Dio describes an ideal king ruling by means of "friendship" – that is, through patronage and a network of local notables who act as mediators between the ruled and the ruler. Dio's notion of being "friend" to Trajan (or any other Roman emperor), however, was that of an informal arrangement, that involved no formal entry of such "friends" into the Roman administration.

=== Greek-Roman relations ===
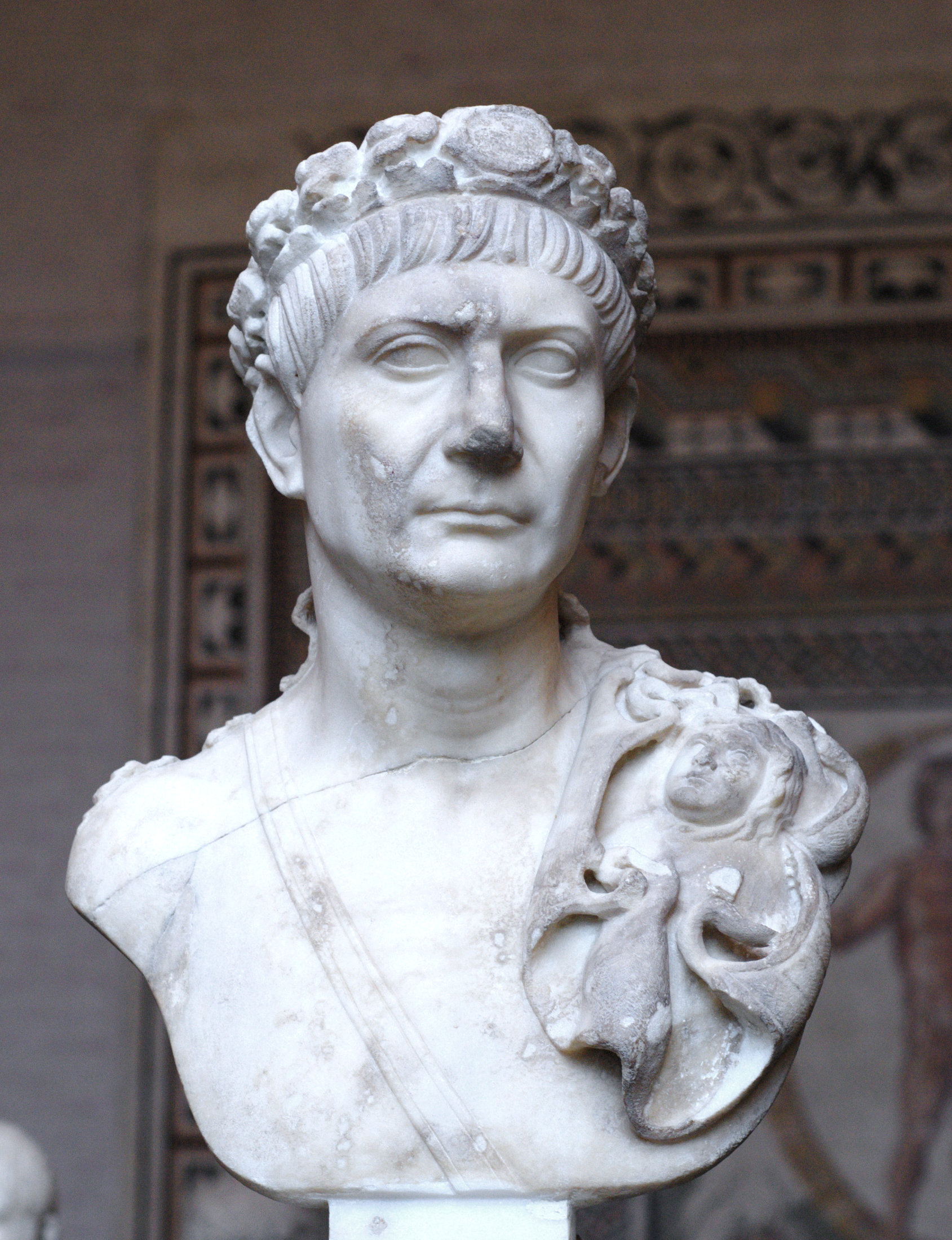
Bust of Trajan wearing the Civic Crown, Glyptothek, Munich

As a senatorial Emperor, Trajan was inclined to choose his local base of political support from among the members of the ruling urban oligarchies; in the West, that meant local senatorial families like his own, in the East, it meant the families of Greek notables. To this end, Trajan ingratiated himself with the Greek intellectual elite by recalling to Rome many (including Dio) who had been exiled by Domitian, and by returning (in a process begun by Nerva) a great deal of private property that Domitian had confiscated. He also had good dealings with Plutarch, who, as a notable of Delphi, seems to have been favoured by the decisions taken on behalf of his home-place by one of Trajan's legates, who had arbitrated a boundary dispute between Delphi and its neighbouring cities.

However, it was clear to Trajan that Greek intellectuals and notables were to be regarded as tools for local administration, and not be allowed to fancy themselves in a privileged position. As Pliny said in one of his letters at the time, it was official policy that Greek civic elites be treated according to their status as notionally free, but not put on an equal footing with their Roman rulers.

When the city of Apamea complained of an audit of its accounts by Pliny, alleging its "free" status as a Roman colony, Trajan replied by writing that it was by his own wish that such inspections had been ordered. Concern about independent local political activity is seen in Trajan's decision to forbid Nicomedia from having a corps of firemen ("If people assemble for a common purpose ... they soon turn it into a political society", Trajan wrote to Pliny) as well as in his and Pliny's fears about excessive civic generosities by local notables such as distribution of money or gifts. Pliny's letters suggest that Trajan and his aides were as much bored as they were alarmed by the claims of Dio and other Greek notables to political influence based on what they saw as their "special connection" to their Roman overlords.

The Greeks had their own memories of independence, a commonly acknowledged sense of cultural superiority, and instead of seeing themselves as Roman, disdained Roman rule. What the Greek oligarchies wanted from Rome was, above all, to be left in peace, to be allowed to exert their right to self-government (i.e., to be excluded from the provincial government, as was Italy) and to concentrate on their local interests. This was something the Romans were not disposed to do as from their perspective the Greek notables were shunning their responsibilities in regard to the management of Imperial affairs – primarily in failing to keep the common people under control, thus creating the need for the Roman governor to intervene.

On the local level, among the lower section of the Eastern propertied, the alienation of most Greek notables and intellectuals towards Roman rule, and the fact that the Romans were seen by most such Greek notables as aliens, persisted well after Trajan's reign. An excellent example of this Greek alienation was the personal role played by Trajan in his relationship with Dio of Prusa: Dio is described by Philostratus as Trajan's close friend, and Trajan as supposedly engaging publicly in conversations with Dio; nevertheless, as a Greek local magnate with a taste for costly building projects and pretensions of being an important political agent for Rome, Dio of Prusa was actually a target for correctores. However, while Pliny does tell of Dio of Prusa placing a statue of Trajan in a building complex where Dio's wife and son were buried, therefore incurring a charge of treason for placing the emperor's statue near a grave, Trajan dropped the charge.

It must also be added that, although Trajan was wary of the civic oligarchies in the Greek cities, he also admitted into the senate at least fourteen prominent Eastern notables, who had been already slated for promotion during Domitian's reign by reserving for them one of the twenty posts open each year for minor magistrates (the vigintiviri); such unprecedented recruitment number opens to question the issue of the "traditionally Roman" character of his reign, as well as the "Hellenism" of his successor Hadrian. But then Trajan's new Eastern senators were mostly very powerful and very wealthy men with more than local influence and much interconnected by marriage, so that many of them were not altogether "new" to the Senate.

Prominent Eastern senators included: the Galatian notable and "leading member of the Greek community" (according to one inscription) Gaius Julius Severus, who was a descendant of several Hellenistic dynasts and client kings, and grandfather of the prominent general Gaius Julius Quadratus Bassus, consul in 105, Gaius Julius Alexander Berenicianus, a descendant of Herod the Great, suffect consul in 116, and the Athenian Gaius Julius Antiochus Epiphanes Philopappos, a member of the Royal House of Commagene, who left behind him a funeral monument on the Mouseion Hill that was later disparagingly described by Pausanias as "a monument built to a Syrian man".

==== Local notables' building projects ====
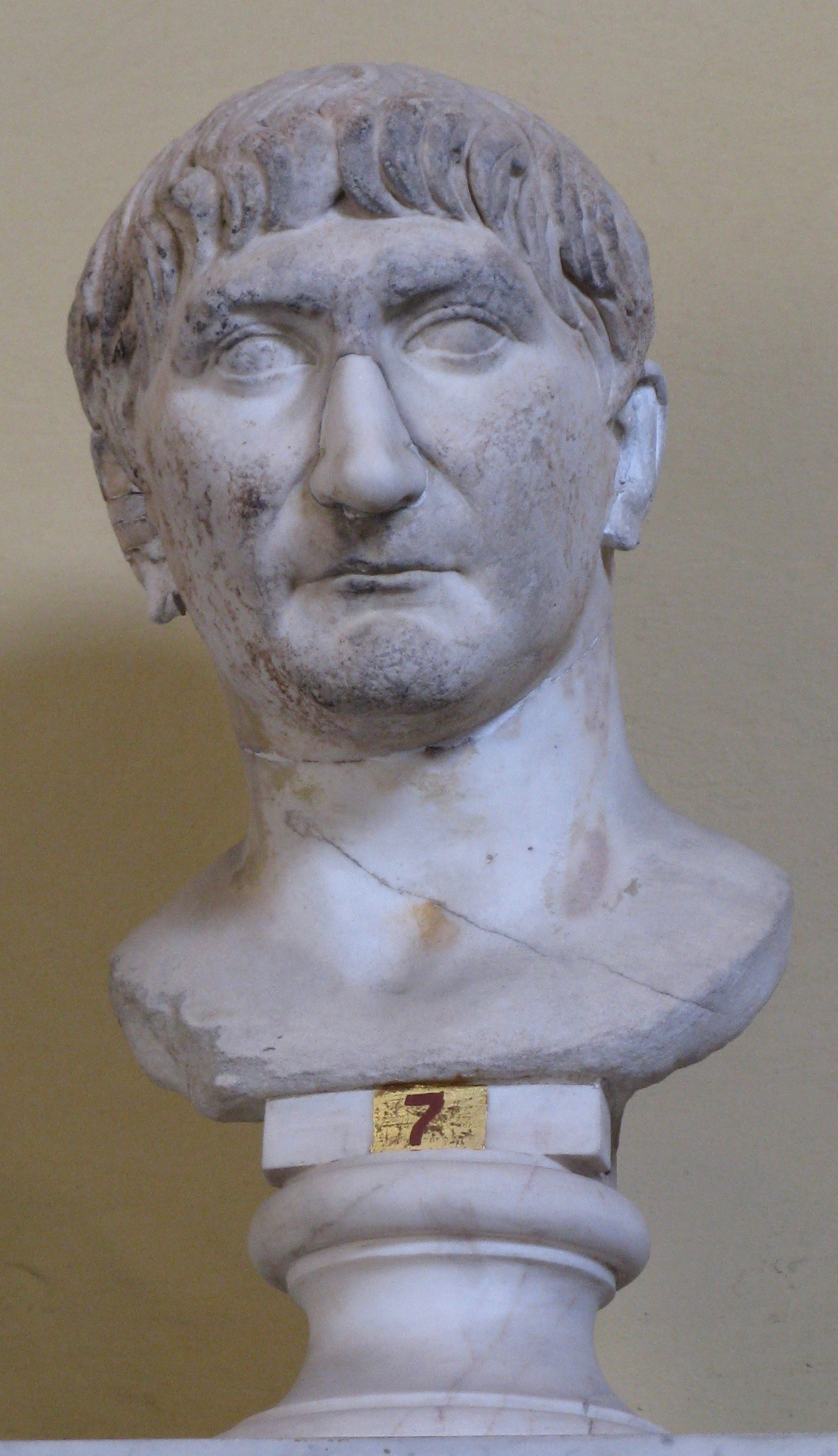
A bust of Trajan, Chiaramonti Museum

Roman authorities liked to play the Greek cities against one another, something of which Dio of Prusa was fully aware:

[B]y their public acts [the Roman governors] have branded you as a pack of fools, yes, they treat you just like children, for we often offer children the most trivial things in place of things of greatest worth [...] In place of justice, in place of the freedom of the cities from spoliation or from the seizure of the private possessions of their inhabitants, in place of their refraining from insulting you [...] your governors hand you titles, and call you 'first' either by word of mouth or in writing; that done, they may thenceforth with impunity treat you as being the very last!"

This sort of competition came with many undesired effects for those same Roman authorities: rivalry among Greek cities and their ruling oligarchies was mainly for marks of pre-eminence, especially for titles bestowed by the Roman emperor. Such titles were ordered in a ranking system that determined how the cities were to be outwardly treated by Rome. The usual form that such rivalries took was that of grandiose building plans, giving the cities the opportunity to vie with each other over "extravagant, needless ... structures that would make a show".

Such extravagant spending meant that junior and thus less wealthy members of the local oligarchies felt disinclined to present themselves to fill posts as local magistrates, positions that involved ever-increasing personal expense. Additionally, inordinate spending on civic buildings was a means to achieve local superiority, and a way for the local Greek elites to maintain a separate cultural identity – something expressed in the contemporary rise of the Second Sophistic. This "cultural patriotism" acted as a kind of substitute for the loss of political independence, and as such was shunned by Roman authorities. As Trajan himself wrote to Pliny: "These poor Greeks all love a gymnasium ... they will have to content with one that suits their real needs".

An example of yet another challenge this system posed to the romans can be taken from Prusa: an embassy from Dio's city of Prusa was not favourably received by Trajan, this had to do with Dio's chief objective, which was to elevate Prusa to the status of a free city, an "independent" city-state exempt from paying taxes to Rome. Eventually, Dio gained for Prusa the right to become the head of the assize-district, conventus (meaning that Prusans did not have to travel to be judged by the Roman governor), but eleutheria (freedom, in the sense of full political autonomy) was denied.

Eventually, it fell to Pliny, as imperial governor of Bithynia in AD 110, to deal with the consequences of the financial mess wrought by Dio and his fellow civic officials. "It's well established that [the cities' finances] are in a state of disorder" Pliny once wrote to Trajan; plans for unnecessary works made in collusion with local contractors being identified as one of the main problems. This was obviously an issue for Roman authorities interested in assuring the cities' solvency and therefore ready collection of Imperial taxes.

One of the compensatory measures proposed by Pliny expressed a thoroughly Roman conservative position: as the cities' financial solvency depended on the councilmen's purses, it was necessary to have more councilmen on the local city councils. According to Pliny, the best way to achieve this was to lower the minimum age for holding a seat on the council, making it possible for more sons of the established oligarchical families to join and thus contribute to civic spending; this was seen as preferable to enrolling non-noble wealthy upstarts. Such an increase in the number of council members was granted to Dio's city of Prusa, to the dismay of existing councilmen who felt their status lowered. A similar situation existed in Claudiopolis, where a public bath was built with the proceeds from the entrance fees paid by "supernumerary" members of the council, enrolled with Trajan's permission.

According to the Digest, Trajan decreed that when a city magistrate promised to achieve a particular public building, his heirs inherited responsibility for its completion.

==== Correctores ====
Imperial correctores, one of Trajan's authoritarian innovations, were appointed to audit the civic finances of the technically free Greek cities, with the goal to curb the overenthusiastic spending on public works that served to channel ancient rivalries between neighbouring cities; but as Pliny wrote to Trajan, this had as its most visible consequence a trail of unfinished or ill-kept public utilities. The first known corrector was charged with a commission "to deal with the situation of the free cities", as it was felt that the old method of ad hoc intervention by the Emperor and/or the proconsuls had not been enough to curb the pretensions of the Greek notables.

Nevertheless, while the office of corrector was intended as a tool to curb any hint of independent political activity among local notables in the Greek cities, the correctores themselves were all men of the highest social standing entrusted with an exceptional commission. The post seems to have been conceived partly as a reward for senators who had chosen to make a career solely on the emperor's behalf. Therefore, in reality the post was conceived as a means for "taming" both Greek notables and Roman senators.

=== Building projects ===
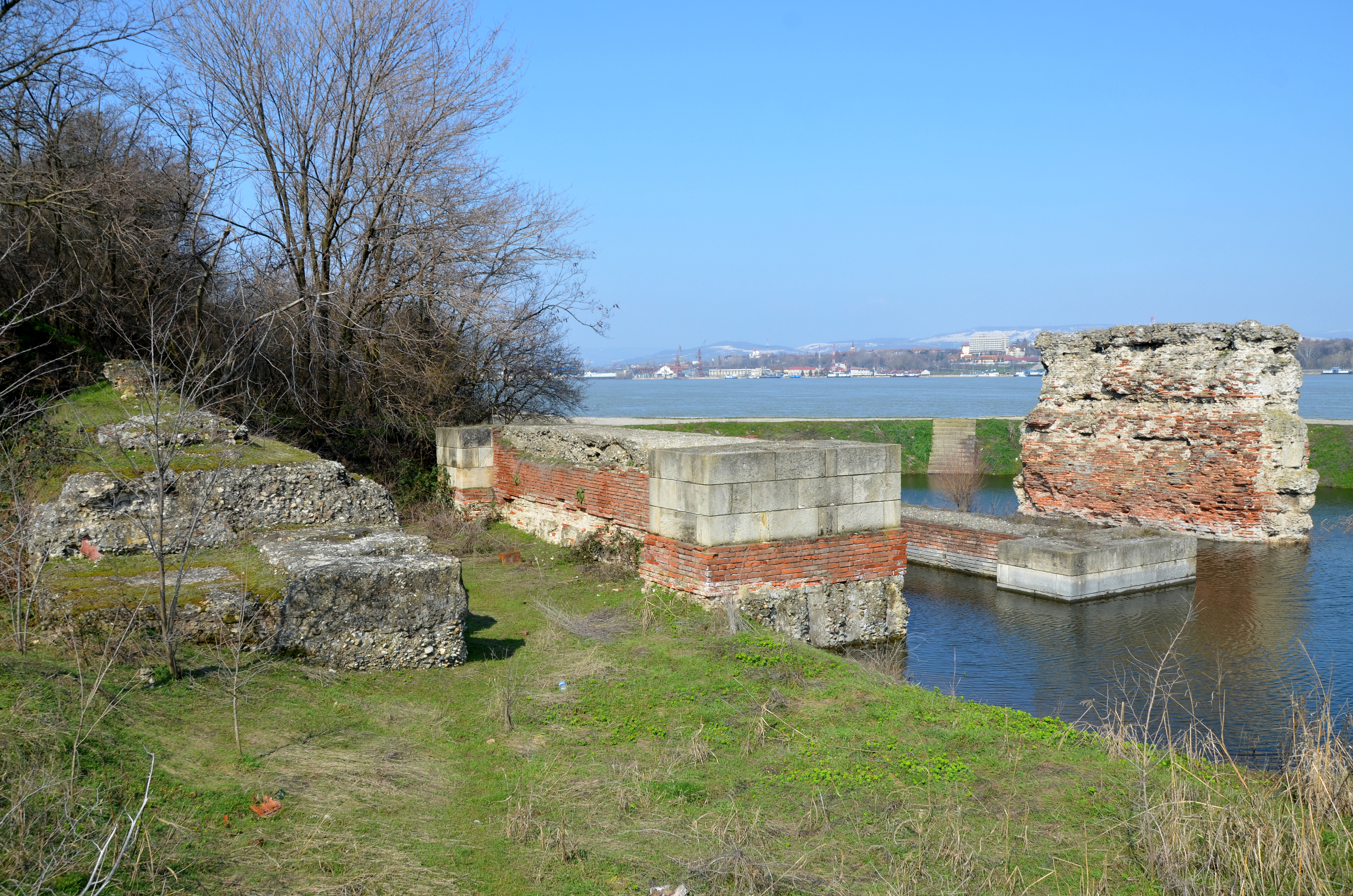
Supporting piers of Trajan's Bridge on the right bank of the Danube, in modern Serbia. Its wooden superstructure was dismantled by Hadrian, presumably to reduce the threat of invasion from the north.

Trajan was a prolific and well-rounded builder. Many of his buildings were designed and erected by the gifted architect Apollodorus of Damascus, including a massive bridge over the Danube, which the Roman army and its reinforcements could use regardless of weather; the Danube sometimes froze over in winter, but seldom enough to bear the passage of a party of soldiers. Trajan's works at the Iron Gates region of the Danube created or enlarged the boardwalk road cut into the cliff-face along the Iron Gate's gorge. A canal was built between the Danube's Kasajna tributary and Ducis Pratum, circumventing rapids and cataracts.

Trajan's Forum Traiani was Rome's largest forum. It was built to commemorate his victories in Dacia, and was largely financed from that campaign's loot. To accommodate it, parts of the Capitoline and Quirinal Hills had to be removed, the latter enlarging a clear area first established by Domitian. Apollodorus of Damascus' "magnificent" design incorporated a Triumphal arch entrance, a forum space approximately 120 m long and 90m wide, surrounded by peristyles: a monumentally sized basilica: and later, the famous Trajan's Column and libraries. It was started in AD 107, dedicated on 1 January 112, and remained in use for at least 500 years. It still drew admiration when Emperor Constantius II visited Rome in the fourth century. It accommodated Trajan's Market, and an adjacent brick market.

Trajan was also a prolific builder of triumphal arches, many of which survive. He built roads, such as the Via Traiana, an extension of the Via Appia from Beneventum to Brundisium and the Via Traiana Nova, a mostly military road between Damascus and Aila, which Rome employed in its annexation of Nabataea and founding of Arabia Province.

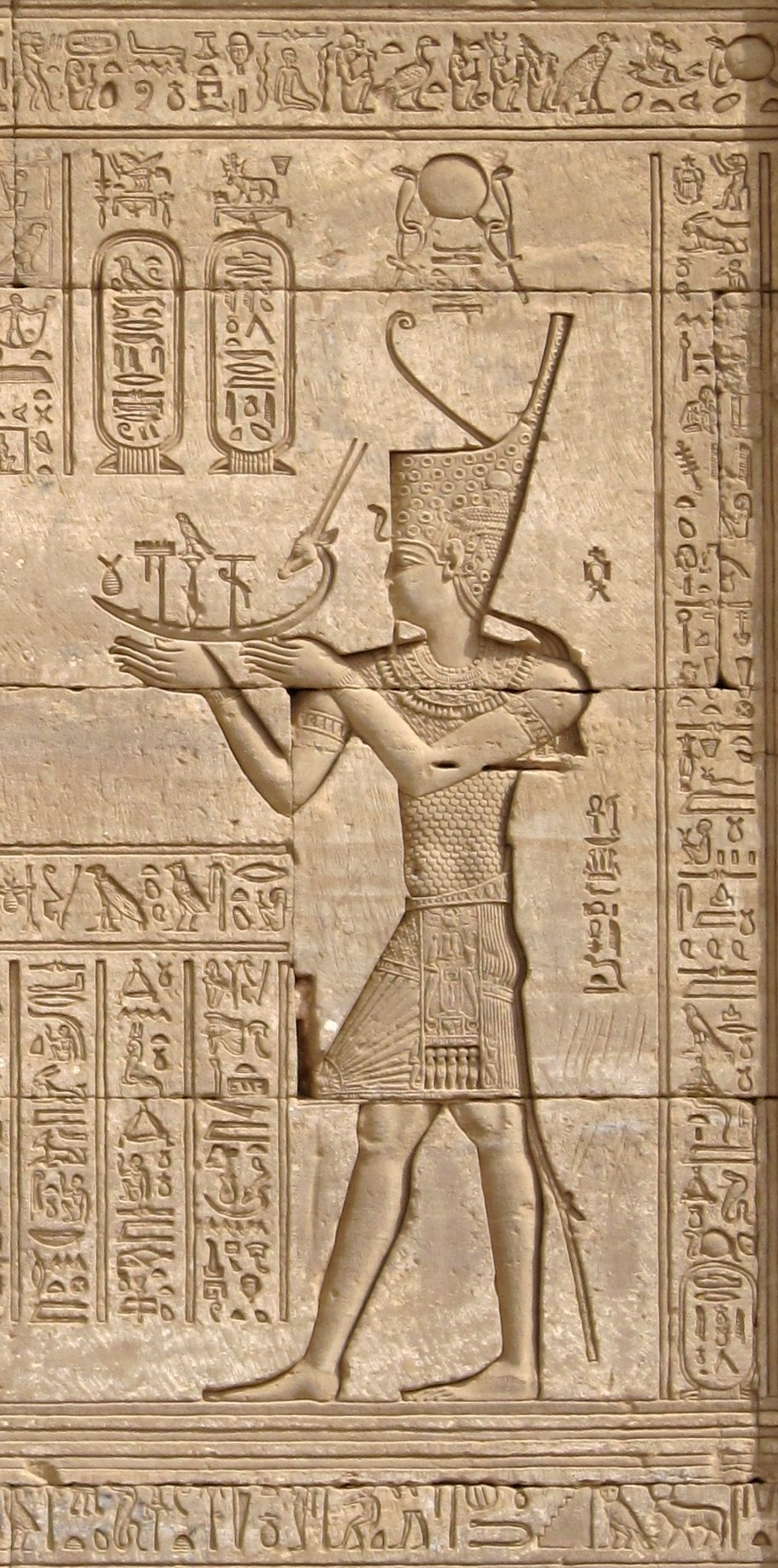
Emperor Trajan represented on the Roman mammisi at Dendera as a pharaoh (with hieroglyphic name ) making offerings to Egyptian gods.

Some historians attribute the construction or reconstruction of Old Cairo's Roman fortress (also known as "Babylon Fort") to Trajan, and the building of a canal between the River Nile and the Red Sea. In Egypt, Trajan was "quite active" in constructing and embellishing buildings. He is portrayed, together with Domitian, on the propylon of the Temple of Hathor at Dendera. His cartouche also appears in the column shafts of the Temple of Khnum at Esna. (Note: "Trajan was, in fact, quite active in Egypt. Separate scenes of Domitian and Trajan making offerings to the gods appear on reliefs on the propylon of the Temple of Hathor at Dendera. There are cartouches of Domitian and Trajan on the column shafts of the Temple of Knum at Esna, and on the exterior a frieze text mentions Domitian, Trajan, and Hadrian")

He built palatial villas outside Rome at Arcinazzo, at Centumcellae and at Talamone. He also built a bath complex as well as the Aqua Traiana.

=== Games ===
Trajan invested heavily in the provision of popular amusements. He carried out a "massive reconstruction" of the Circus Maximus, which was already the empire's biggest and best appointed circuit for the immensely popular sport of chariot racing. The Circus also hosted religious theatrical spectacles and games, and public processions on a grand scale. Trajan's reconstruction, completed by 103, was modestly described by Trajan himself as "adequate" for the Roman people. It replaced flammable wooden seating tiers with stone, and increased the Circus' already vast capacity by about 5,000 seats. Its lofty, elevated Imperial viewing box was rebuilt among the seating tiers, so that spectators could see their emperor sharing their enjoyment of the races, alongside his family and images of the gods.

At some time during 108 or 109, Trajan held 123 days of games to celebrate his Dacian victory. They involved "fully 10,000" gladiators and the slaughter of thousands, "possibly tens of thousands," of animals, both wild and domestic. Trajan's careful management of public spectacles led the orator Fronto to congratulate him for paying equal attention to public entertainments and more serious issues, acknowledging that "neglect of serious matters can cause greater damage, but neglect of amusements greater discontent". State-funded public entertainments helped to maintain contentment among the populace; the more "serious matter" of the corn dole aimed to satisfy individuals.

=== Christians ===
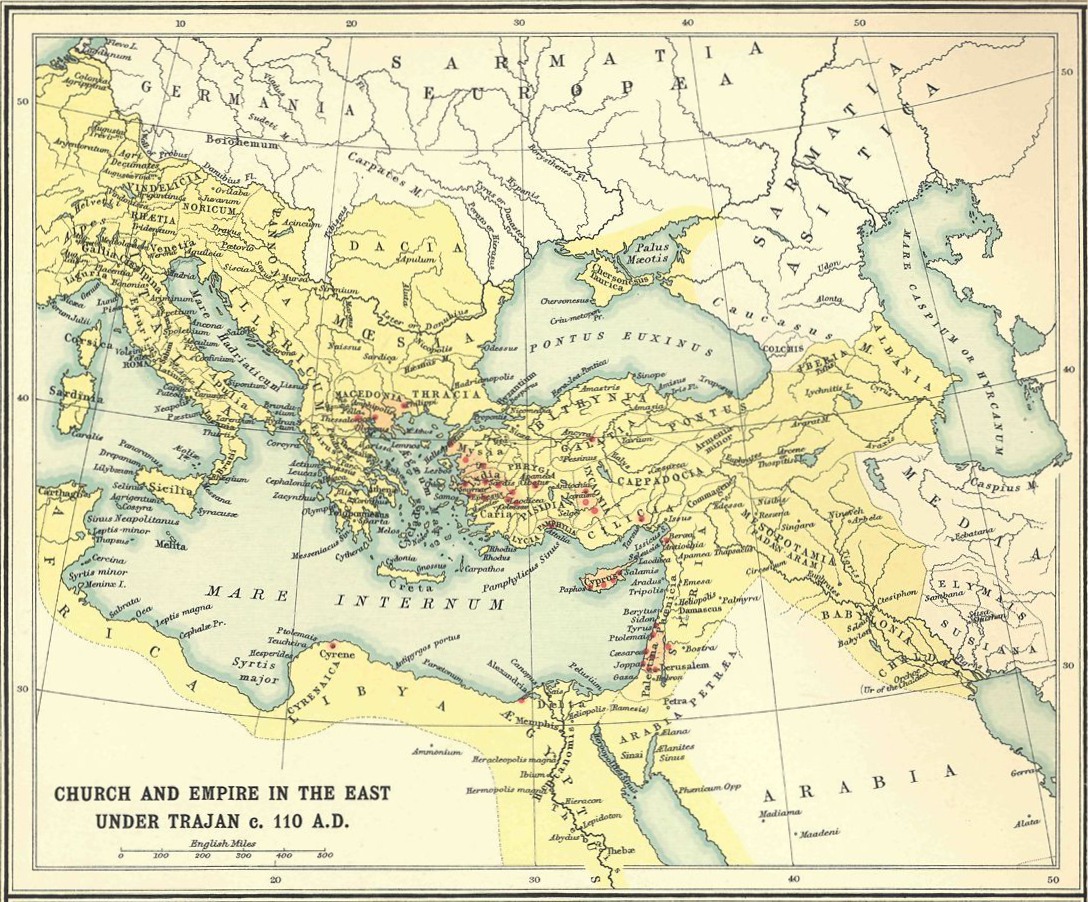
In red, Christian communities in the Roman Empire under Emperor Trajan.

During the period of peace that followed the Dacian war, Trajan exchanged letters with Pliny the Younger on how best to deal with the Christians of Pontus. Trajan told Pliny to continue prosecutions of Christians if they merited that, but not to accept anonymous or malicious denunciations. He considered this to be in the interests of justice, and to reflect "the spirit of the age". Non-citizens who admitted to being Christians and refused to recant were to be executed "for obstinacy". Citizens were sent to Rome for trial.

Further tests faced by Christians in Pontus are alluded to in correspondence between Pliny the Younger, governor of the Roman province of Bithynia and Pontus, and Emperor Trajan. Writing from Pontus in about AD 112, Pliny reported that the "contagion" of Christianity threatened everyone, regardless of gender, age, or rank. Pliny gave those accused of being Christians opportunity to deny it, and those who would not, he executed. Any who cursed Christ or recited a prayer to the gods or to Trajan’s statue were released. Pliny acknowledged that these were things that "those who are really Christians cannot be made to do."

=== Currency and welfare ===
In 107, Trajan devalued the Roman currency, decreasing the silver content of the denarius from 93.5% to 89.0% – the actual silver weight dropping from 3.04 grams to 2.88 grams. This devaluation, along with the massive amounts of gold and silver acquired through his Dacian wars, allowed Trajan to mint many more denarii than his predecessors. He also withdrew from circulation silver denarii minted before Nero's devaluation. Trajan's devaluation may have had a political intent, enabling planned increases in civil and military spending.

Trajan formalised the alimenta, a welfare program that helped orphans and poor children throughout Italy by providing cash, food and subsidized education. The program was supported out of Dacian War booty, estate taxes and philanthropy. The alimenta also relied indirectly on mortgages secured against Italian farms (fundi). Registered landowners received a lump sum from the imperial treasury, and in return were expected to repay an annual sum to support the alimentary fund.

== Military campaigns ==
=== Conquest of Dacia ===
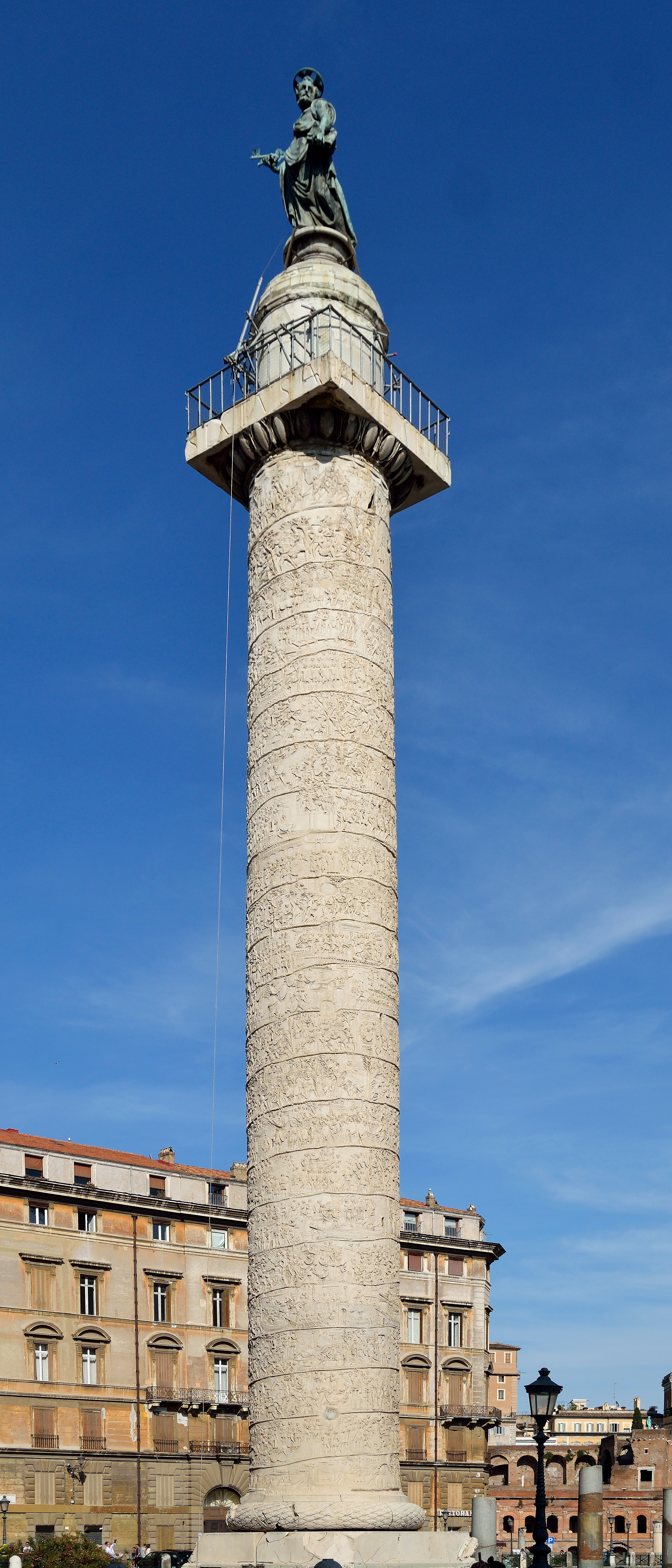
Trajan's Column, Rome

The earliest of Trajan's conquests were Rome's two wars against Dacia, an area that had troubled Roman politics for over a decade in regard to the unstable peace negotiated by Domitian's ministers with the powerful Dacian king Decebalus. Dacia was reduced by Trajan's Rome to a client kingdom in the first war (101–102), followed by a second war that ended in actual incorporation into the Empire of the trans-Danube border group of Dacia. According to the provisions of Decebalus's earlier treaty with Rome, made in the time of Domitian, Decebalus was acknowledged as rex amicus, that is, client king. In exchange for accepting client status, he received from Rome both a generous stipend and a steady supply of technical experts.

The treaty seems to have allowed Roman troops the right of passage through the Dacian kingdom in order to attack the Marcomanni, Quadi and Sarmatians. However, senatorial opinion never forgave Domitian for paying what was seen as tribute to a barbarian king. Unlike the Germanic tribes, the Dacian kingdom was an organized state capable of developing alliances of its own, thus making it a strategic threat and giving Trajan a strong motive to attack it.

In May of 101, Trajan launched his first campaign into the Dacian kingdom, crossing to the northern bank of the Danube and defeating the Dacian army at Tapae (see Second Battle of Tapae), near the Iron Gates of Transylvania. It was not a decisive victory, however. Trajan's troops took heavy losses in the encounter, and he put off further campaigning for the year in order to regroup and reinforce his army. Nevertheless, the battle was considered a Roman victory and Trajan strived to ultimately consolidate his position, including other major engagements, as well as the capture of Decebalus' sister as depicted on Trajan's Column.

The following winter, Decebalus took the initiative by launching a counter-attack across the Danube further downstream, supported by Sarmatian cavalry, forcing Trajan to come to the aid of the troops in his rearguard. The Dacians and their allies were repulsed after two battles in Moesia, at Nicopolis ad Istrum and Adamclisi. Trajan's army then advanced further into Dacian territory, and, a year later, forced Decebalus to submit. He had to renounce claim to some regions of his kingdom, return runaways from Rome then under his protection (most of them technical experts), and surrender all his war machines. Trajan returned to Rome in triumph and was granted the title Dacicus. The peace of 102 had returned Decebalus to the condition of more or less harmless client king; however, he soon began to rearm, to again harbour Roman runaways, and to pressure his Western neighbours, the Iazyges Sarmatians, into allying themselves with him. Through his efforts to develop an anti-Roman bloc, Decebalus prevented Trajan from treating Dacia as a protectorate instead of an outright conquest. In 104, Decebalus devised an attempt on Trajan's life by means of some Roman deserters, a plan that failed. Decebalus also took prisoner Trajan's legate Longinus, who eventually poisoned himself while in custody. In 105, Decebalus undertook an invasion of Roman-occupied territory north of the Danube.

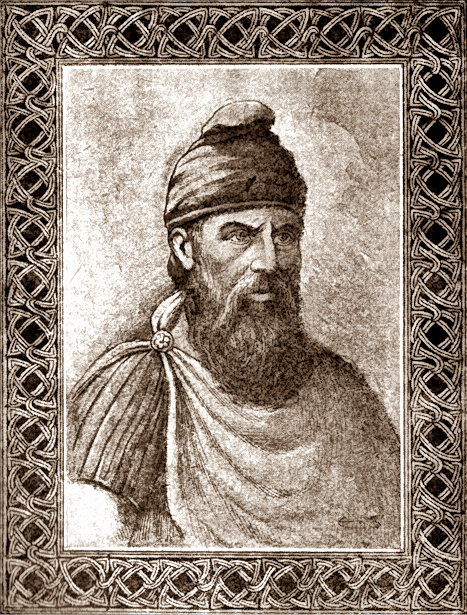
Portrait of King Decebalus in the Cartea omului matur (1919)

Prior to the campaign, Trajan had raised two entirely new legions: II Traiana – which, however, may have been posted in the East, at the Syrian port of Laodicea – and XXX Ulpia Victrix, which was posted to Brigetio, in Pannonia. (Note: In the absence of literary references, however, the positioning of the new legions is conjectural: some scholars think that Legio II Traiana Fortis was originally stationed on the Lower Danube and participated in the Second Dacian War, being only later deployed to the East.) By 105, the concentration of Roman troops assembled in the middle and lower Danube amounted to fourteen legions (up from nine in 101) – about half of the entire Roman army. Even after the Dacian wars, the Danube frontier would permanently replace the Rhine as the main military axis of the Roman Empire. Including auxiliaries, the number of Roman troops engaged on both campaigns was between 150,000 and 175,000, while Decebalus could dispose of up to 200,000. Other estimates for the Roman forces involved in Trajan's second Dacian War cite around 86,000 for active campaigning with large reserves retained in the proximal provinces, and potentially much lower numbers around 50,000 for Decebalus' depleted forces and absent allies.

In a fierce campaign that seems to have consisted mostly of static warfare, the Dacians, devoid of manoeuvring room, kept to their network of fortresses, which the Romans sought systematically to storm (see also Second Dacian War). The Romans gradually tightened their grip around Decebalus' stronghold in Sarmizegetusa Regia, which they finally took and destroyed. A controversial scene on Trajan's column just before the fall of Sarmizegetusa Regia suggests that Decebalus may have offered poison to his remaining men as an alternative option to capture or death while trying to flee the besieged capital with him. Decebalus fled but, when later cornered by Roman cavalry, committed suicide. His severed head, brought to Trajan by the cavalryman Tiberius Claudius Maximus, was later exhibited in Rome on the steps leading up to the Capitol and thrown on the Gemonian stairs. The famous Dacian treasures were not found in the captured capital and their whereabouts were only revealed when a Dacian nobleman called Bikilis was captured. Decebalus’ treasures had been buried under a temporarily diverted river and the captive workers executed to retain the secret. Staggering amounts of gold and silver were found and packed off to fill Rome's coffers.

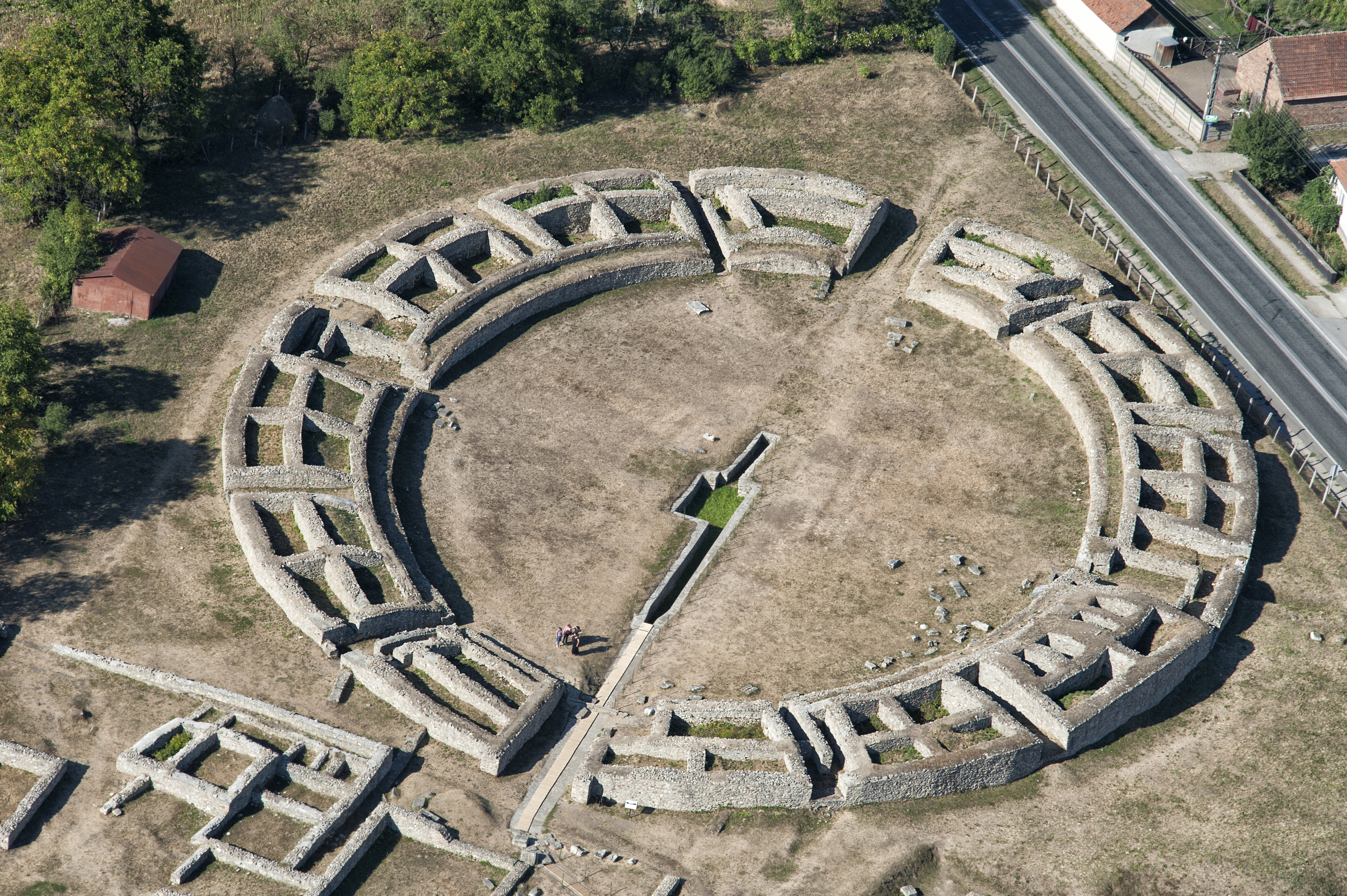
The amphitheater at Ulpia Traiana Sarmizegetusa

Trajan built a new city, Colonia Ulpia Traiana Augusta Dacica Sarmizegetusa, on another site (north of the hill citadel holding the previous Dacian capital), although bearing the same full name, Sarmizegetusa. This capital city was conceived as a purely civilian administrative centre and was provided the usual Romanized administrative apparatus (decurions, aediles, etc.). Urban life in Roman Dacia seems to have been restricted to Roman colonists, mostly military veterans; there is no extant evidence for the existence in the province of peregrine cities. Native Dacians continued to live in scattered rural settlements, according to their own ways. In another arrangement with no parallels in any other Roman province, the existing quasi-urban Dacian settlements disappeared after the Roman conquest.

A number of unorganized urban settlements (vici) developed around military encampments in Dacia proper – the most important being Apulum – but were only acknowledged as cities proper well after Trajan's reign. The main regional effort of urbanization was concentrated by Trajan at the rearguard, in Moesia, where he created the new cities of Nicopolis ad Istrum and Marcianopolis. A vicus was also created around the Tropaeum Traianum. The garrison city of Oescus received the status of Roman colony after its legionary garrison was redeployed. The fact that these former Danubian outposts had ceased to be frontier bases and were now in the deep rear acted as an inducement to their urbanization and development. Not all of Dacia was permanently occupied. After the post-Trajanic evacuation of lands across the lower Danube, land extending from the Danube to the inner arch of the Carpathian Mountains, including Transylvania, the Metaliferi Mountains and Oltenia was absorbed into the Roman province, which eventually took the form of an "excrescence" with ill-defined limits, stretching from the Danube northwards to the Carpathians. This may have been intended as a basis for further expansion within Eastern Europe, as the Romans believed the region to be much more geographically "flattened", and thus easier to traverse, than it actually was; they also underestimated the distance from those vaguely defined borders to the ocean.

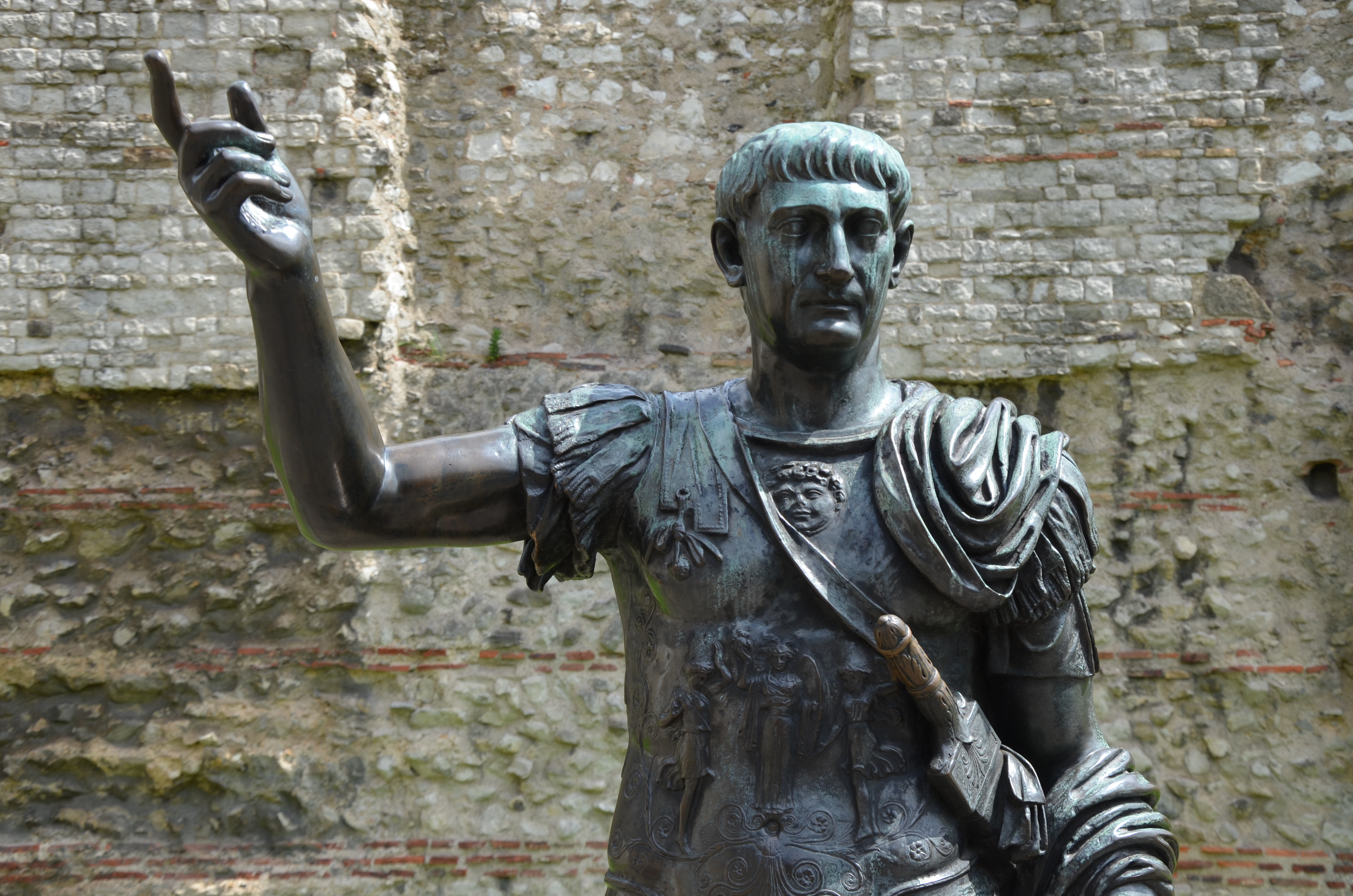
A modern statue of Trajan at Tower Hill, London

Defence of the province was entrusted to a single legion, the XIII Gemina, stationed at Apulum, which functioned as an advance guard that could, in case of need, strike either west or east at the Sarmatians living at the borders. Therefore, the indefensible character of the province did not appear to be a problem for Trajan, as the province was conceived more as a sally-base for further attacks. Even in the absence of further Roman expansion, the value of the province depended on Roman overall strength: while Rome was strong, the Dacian salient was an instrument of military and diplomatic control over the Danubian lands; when Rome was weak, as during the Crisis of the Third Century, the province became a liability and was eventually abandoned. Trajan resettled Dacia with Romans and annexed it as a province of the Roman Empire. Aside from their enormous booty (over half a million slaves, according to John Lydus), Trajan's Dacian campaigns benefited the Empire's finances through the acquisition of Dacia's gold mines, managed by an imperial procurator of equestrian rank (procurator aurariarum). On the other hand, commercial agricultural exploitation on the villa model, based on the centralized management of a huge landed estate by a single owner (fundus) was poorly developed. Therefore, use of slave labor in the province itself seems to have been relatively undeveloped, and epigraphic evidence points to work in the gold mines being conducted by means of labor contracts (locatio conductio rei) and seasonal wage-earning. The victory was commemorated by the construction both of the 102 cenotaph generally known as the Tropaeum Traiani in Moesia, as well of the much later (113) Trajan's Column in Rome, the latter depicting in stone carved bas-reliefs the Dacian Wars' most important moments.

=== Nabataean annexation ===
In 106, Rabbel II Soter, one of Rome's client kings, died. This event might have prompted the annexation of the Nabataean Kingdom, but the manner and the formal reasons for the annexation are unclear. Some epigraphic evidence suggests a military operation, with forces from Syria and Egypt. What is known is that by 107, Roman legions were stationed in the area around Petra and Bosra, as is shown by a papyrus found in Egypt. The furthest south the Romans occupied (or, better, garrisoned, adopting a policy of having garrisons at key points in the desert) was Hegra, over 300 kilometres (190 mi) south-west of Petra.

The empire gained what became the province of Arabia Petraea (modern southern Jordan and northwest Saudi Arabia). At this time, a Roman road (Via Traiana Nova) was built from Aila (now Aqaba) in Limes Arabicus to Bosrah. As Nabataea was the last client kingdom in Asia west of the Euphrates, the annexation meant that the entire Roman East had been provincialized, completing a trend towards direct rule that had begun under the Flavians.

=== Parthian campaign ===
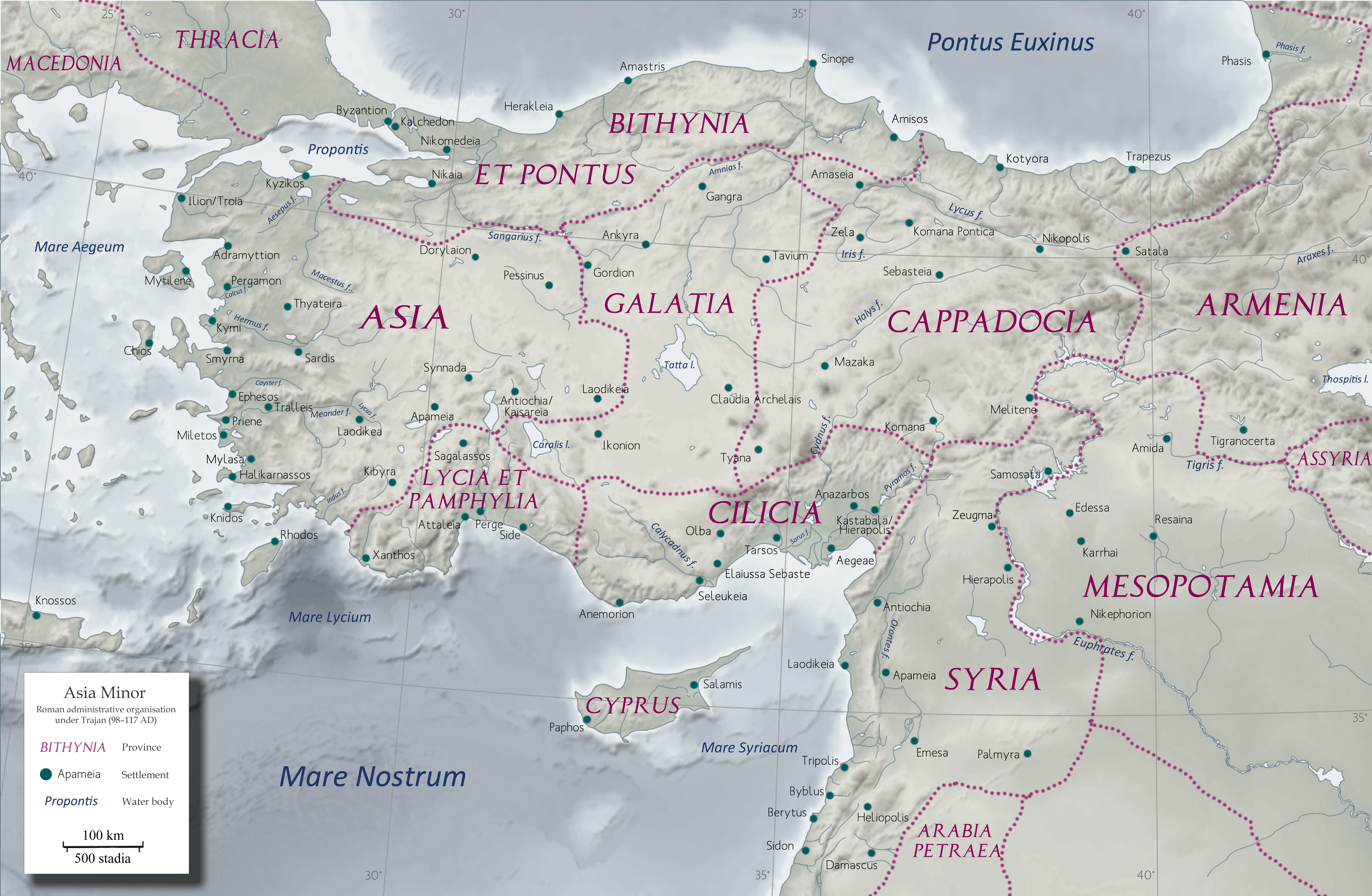
Anatolia, western Caucasus and northern Levant under Trajan

In 113, Trajan embarked on his last campaign, provoked by Parthia's decision to put an unacceptable king on the throne of Armenia, a kingdom over which the two great empires had shared hegemony since the time of Nero some fifty years earlier. Trajan, already in Syria early in 113, consistently refused to accept diplomatic approaches from the Parthians intended to settle the Armenian imbroglio peacefully. As the surviving literary accounts of Trajan's Parthian War are fragmentary and scattered, it is difficult to assign them a proper context, something that has led to a long-running controversy about its precise happenings and ultimate aims.

==== Cause of the war ====
Modern historians advance the possibility that Trajan's decision to wage war against Parthia had economic motives: after Trajan's annexation of Arabia, he built a new road, Via Traiana Nova, that went from Bostra to Aila on the Red Sea. That meant that Charax on the Persian Gulf was the sole remaining western terminus of the Indian trade route outside direct Roman control, and such control was important in order to lower import prices and to limit the supposed drain of precious metals created by the deficit in Roman trade with the Far East.

That Charax traded with the Roman Empire, there can be no doubt, as its actual connections with merchants from Palmyra during the period are well documented in a contemporary Palmyrene epigraph, which tells of various Palmyrene citizens honoured for holding office in Charax. Also, Charax's rulers' domains at the time possibly included the Bahrain islands, which offered the possibility of extending Roman hegemony into the Persian Gulf itself. (A Palmyrene citizen held office as satrap over the islands shortly after Trajan's death, though the appointment was made by a Parthian king of Charax.) The rationale behind Trajan's campaign, in this case, was one of breaking down a system of Far Eastern trade through small Semitic ("Arab") cities under Parthia's control and to put it under Roman control instead.

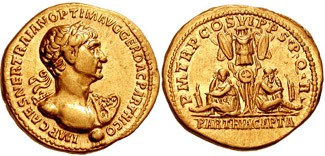
Aureus issued by Trajan to celebrate the conquest of Parthia. Inscription: IMP. CAES. NER. TRAIAN. OPTIM. AVG. GER. DAC. PARTHICO / P. M., TR. P., CO[N]S. VI, P. P., S.P.Q.R. – PARTHIA CAPTA

In his Dacian conquests, Trajan had already resorted to Syrian auxiliary units, whose veterans, along with Syrian traders, had an important role in the subsequent colonization of Dacia. He had recruited Palmyrene units into his army, including a camel unit, therefore apparently procuring Palmyrene support to his ultimate goal of annexing Charax. It has even been ventured that, when earlier in his campaign Trajan annexed Armenia, he was bound to annex the whole of Mesopotamia lest the Parthians interrupt the flux of trade from the Persian Gulf and/or foment trouble at the Roman frontier on the Danube. Other historians reject these motives, as the supposed Parthian "control" over the maritime Far Eastern trade route was, at best, conjectural and based on a selective reading of Chinese sources – trade by land through Parthia seems to have been unhampered by Parthian authorities and left solely to the devices of private enterprise. Commercial activity in second century Mesopotamia seems to have been a general phenomenon, shared by many peoples within and without the Roman Empire, with no sign of a concerted Imperial policy towards it.

As in the case of the alimenta, scholars like Moses Finley and Paul Veyne have considered the idea that a foreign trade policy underlay Trajan's war to be anachronistic; according to these scholars, the concern of Roman leaders with the trade in far eastern luxuries – besides collecting toll taxes and customs – was moral in nature, because contemporary Roman mores frowned upon the "softness" of luxuries. In the absence of conclusive evidence, trade between Rome and India might have been far more balanced, in terms of quantities of precious metals exchanged: one of our sources for the notion of the Roman gold drain – Pliny's the Younger's uncle Pliny the Elder – had earlier described the Gangetic Plains as one of the gold sources for the Roman Empire. Accordingly – in a controversial book on the Roman economy – Finley considers Trajan's "badly miscalculated and expensive assault on Parthia" to be an example of the many Roman "commercial wars" that had in common the fact of existing only in the books of modern historians.

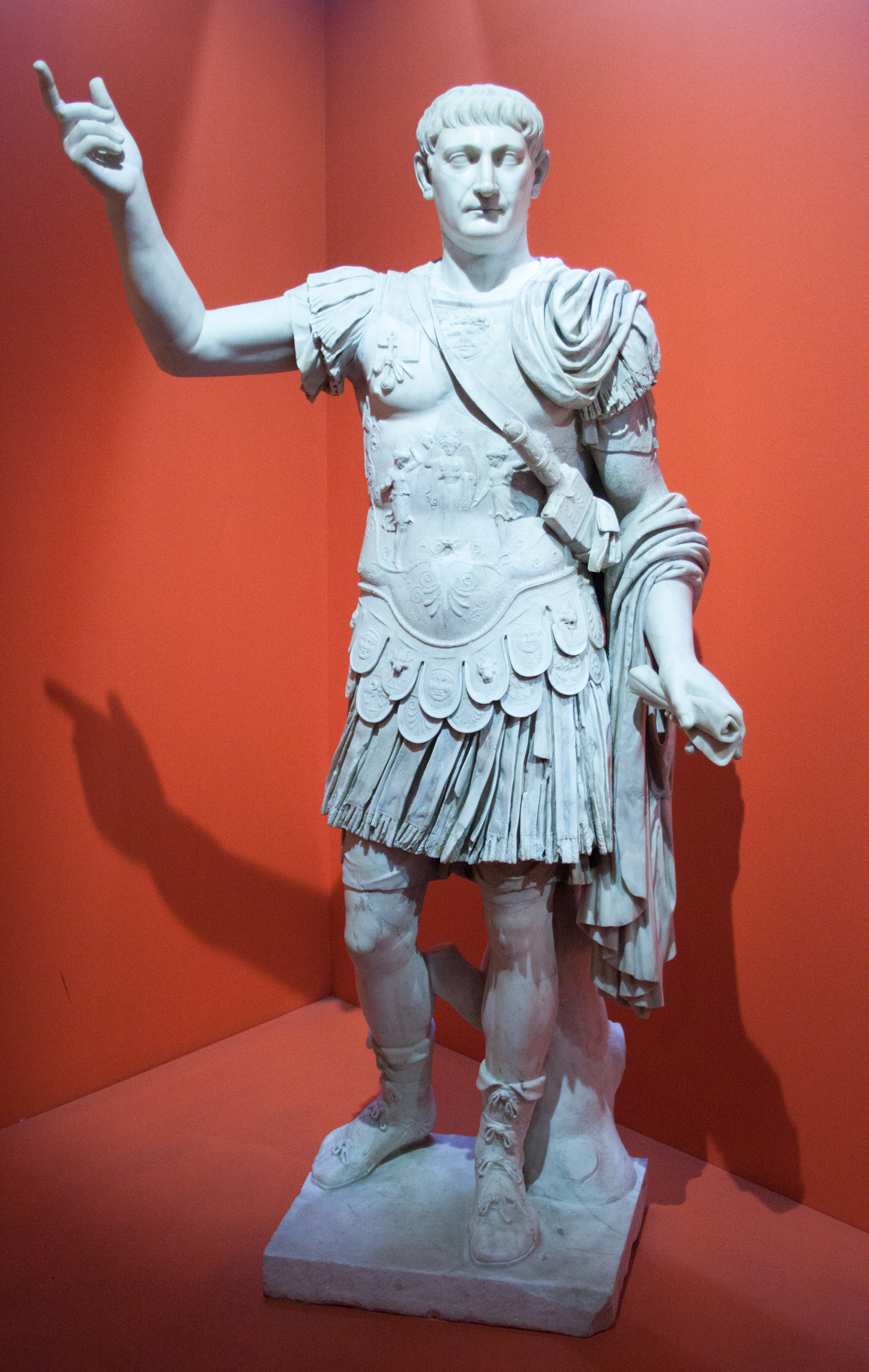
Trajan, "the Palladium", white marble statue at Naples Archaeological Museum, late 1st century AD

The alternative view is to see the campaign as triggered by the incentive of territorial annexation and prestige, the sole motive ascribed by Cassius Dio. As far as territorial conquest involved tax-collecting, especially of the 25% tax levied on all goods entering the Roman Empire, the tetarte, one can say that Trajan's Parthian War had an "economic" motive. Also, there was the propaganda value of an Eastern conquest that would emulate, in Roman fashion, those of Alexander the Great. The fact that emissaries from the Kushan Empire might have attended to the commemorative ceremonies for the Dacian War may have prompted Greco-Roman intellectuals like Plutarch – who wrote about only 70,000 Roman soldiers being necessary to a conquest of India – as well as in Trajan's closer associates, speculation about the treasure to be obtained by reproducing Macedonian Eastern conquests. There could also be Trajan's idea to use an ambitious blueprint of conquests as a way to emphasize quasi-divine status, such as with his cultivated association, in coins and monuments, to Hercules.

It is possible that the attachment of Trajan to an expansionist policy was supported by a powerful circle of conservative senators from Hispania committed to a policy of imperial expansion, first among them being Licinius Sura. Alternatively, one can explain the campaign by the fact that, for the Romans, their empire was in principle unlimited, and that Trajan only took advantage of an opportunity to make idea and reality coincide. There are other modern historians who think that Trajan's original aims were purely military and strategic: to assure a more defensible Eastern frontier for the empire, crossing Northern Mesopotamia along the course of the Khabur River in order to offer cover to a Roman Armenia. This interpretation is backed by the fact that all subsequent Roman wars against Parthia would aim at establishing a Roman presence deep into Parthia itself. It is possible that during the onset of Trajan's military experience, as a young tribune, he had witnessed engagement with the Parthians; so any strategic vision was grounded in a tactical awareness of what was needed to tackle Parthia.

==== Course of the war ====
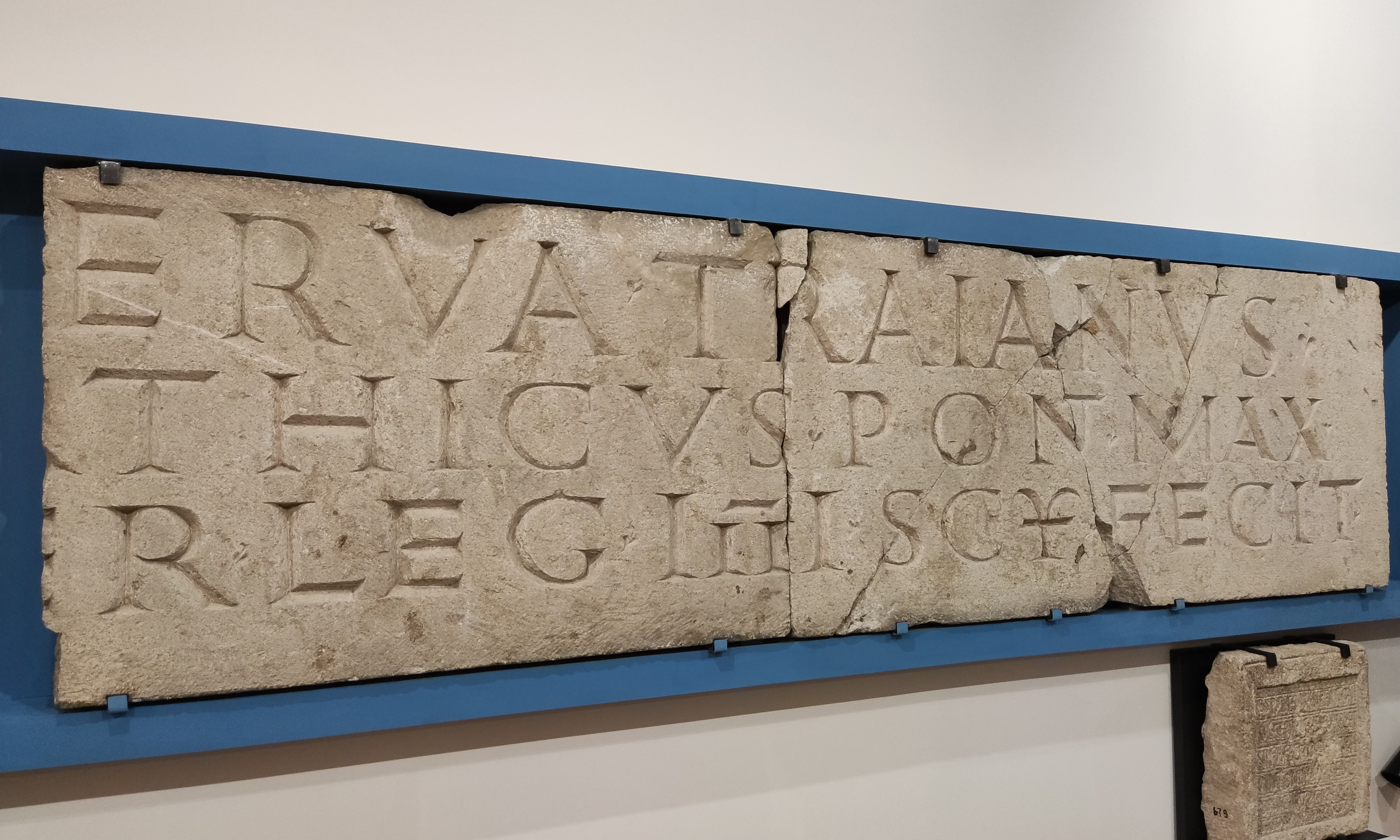
An AD 116 inscription of the Legio IV Scythica found near the Armenian capital Artaxata mentioning Trajan.

The campaign was carefully planned in advance: ten legions were concentrated in the Eastern theatre; since 111, the correspondence of Pliny the Younger witnesses to the fact that provincial authorities in Bithynia had to organize supplies for passing troops, and local city councils and their individual members had to shoulder part of the increased expenses by supplying troops themselves. The intended campaign, therefore, was immensely costly from its very beginning.

Trajan marched first on Armenia, deposed the Parthian-appointed king, Parthamasiris (who was afterwards murdered while kept in the custody of Roman troops in an unclear incident, later described by Fronto as a breach of Roman good faith), and annexed it to the Roman Empire as a province, receiving in passing the acknowledgement of Roman hegemony by various tribes in the Caucasus and on the Eastern coast of the Black Sea – a process that kept him busy until the end of 114. At the same time, a Roman column under the legate Lusius Quietus – an outstanding cavalry general who had signalled himself during the Dacian Wars by commanding a unit from his native Mauretania – crossed the Araxes river from Armenia into Media Atropatene and the land of the Mardians (present-day Ghilan).

It is possible that Quietus' campaign had as its goal the extending of the newer, more defensible Roman border eastwards towards the Caspian Sea and northwards to the foothills of the Caucasus. This newer, more "rational" frontier, depended, however, on an increased, permanent Roman presence east of the Euphrates.

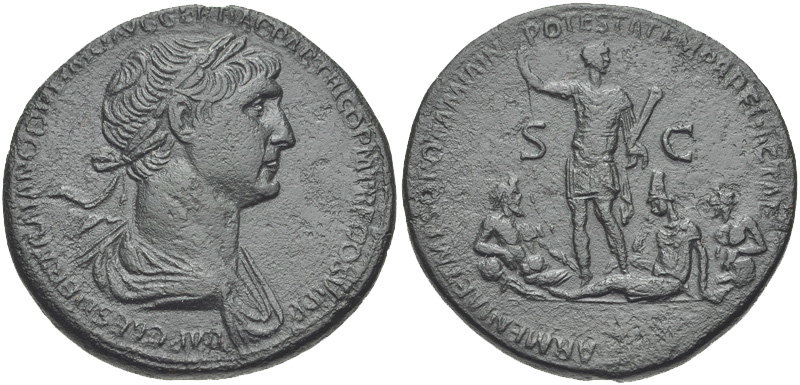
Sestertius during 116 to commemorate Trajan's Parthian victories. Obverse: bust of Trajan, with laurel crown; caption: IMP. CAES. NERV. TRAIANO OPTIMO AVG. GER. DAC. PARTHICO P. M., TR. P., COS VI, P. P.; Reverse: Trajan standing between prostrate allegories of Armenia (crowned with a tiara) and the Rivers Tigris & Euphrates; caption: ARMENIA ET MESOPOTAMIA IN POTESTATEM P. R. REDACTAE (put under the authority of the Roman People) – S. C. (Senatus Consultus, issued by the Senate).

The chronology of subsequent events is uncertain, but it is generally believed that early in 115 Trajan launched a Mesopotamian campaign, marching down towards the Taurus mountains in order to consolidate territory between the Tigris and Euphrates rivers. He placed permanent garrisons along the way to secure the territory. While Trajan moved from west to east, Lusius Quietus moved with his army from the Caspian Sea towards the west, both armies performing a successful pincer movement, whose apparent result was to establish a Roman presence into the Parthian Empire proper.

Trajan took the northern Mesopotamian cities of Nisibis and Batnae and organized a province of Mesopotamia, including the Kingdom of Osrhoene – where King Abgar VII submitted to Trajan publicly (Note: According to Cassius Dio, the deal between Trajan and Abgaros was sealed by the king's son offering himself as Trajan's paramour.) – as a Roman protectorate. This process seems to have been completed at the beginning of 116, when coins were issued announcing that Armenia and Mesopotamia had been put under the authority of the Roman people. The area between the Khabur River and the mountains around Singara seems to have been considered as the new frontier, and as such received a road surrounded by fortresses.

After wintering in Antioch during 115/116 – and, according to literary sources, barely escaping from a violent earthquake that claimed the life of one of the consuls, Marcus Pedo Virgilianus – Trajan again took to the field in 116, with a view to the conquest of the whole of Mesopotamia, an overambitious goal that eventually backfired on the results of his entire campaign. According to some modern historians, the aim of the campaign of 116 was to achieve a "pre-emptive demonstration" aiming not toward the conquest of Parthia, but for tighter Roman control over the Eastern trade route. However, the overall scarcity of manpower for the Roman military establishment meant that the campaign was doomed from the start. It is noteworthy that no new legions were raised by Trajan before the Parthian campaign, maybe because the sources of new citizen recruits were already over-exploited.

As far as the sources allow a description of this campaign, it seems that one Roman division crossed the Tigris into Adiabene, sweeping south and capturing Adenystrae; a second followed the river south, capturing Babylon; Trajan himself sailed down the Euphrates from Dura-Europos – where a triumphal arch was erected in his honour – through Ozogardana, where he erected a "tribunal" still to be seen at the time of Julian the Apostate's campaigns in the same area. Having come to the narrow strip of land between the Euphrates and the Tigris, he then dragged his fleet overland into the Tigris, capturing Seleucia and finally the Parthian capital of Ctesiphon.

He continued southward to the Persian Gulf, when, after escaping with his fleet a tidal bore on the Tigris, he received the submission of Athambelus, the ruler of Charax. He declared Babylon a new province of the Empire and had his statue erected on the shore of the Persian Gulf, after which he sent the Senate a laurelled letter declaring the war to be at a close and bemoaning that he was too old to go on any further and repeat the conquests of Alexander the Great. Since Charax was a de facto independent kingdom whose connections to Palmyra were described above, Trajan's bid for the Persian Gulf may have coincided with Palmyrene interests in the region. Another hypothesis is that the rulers of Charax had expansionist designs on Parthian Babylon, giving them a rationale for alliance with Trajan. The Parthian city of Susa was apparently also occupied by the Romans.

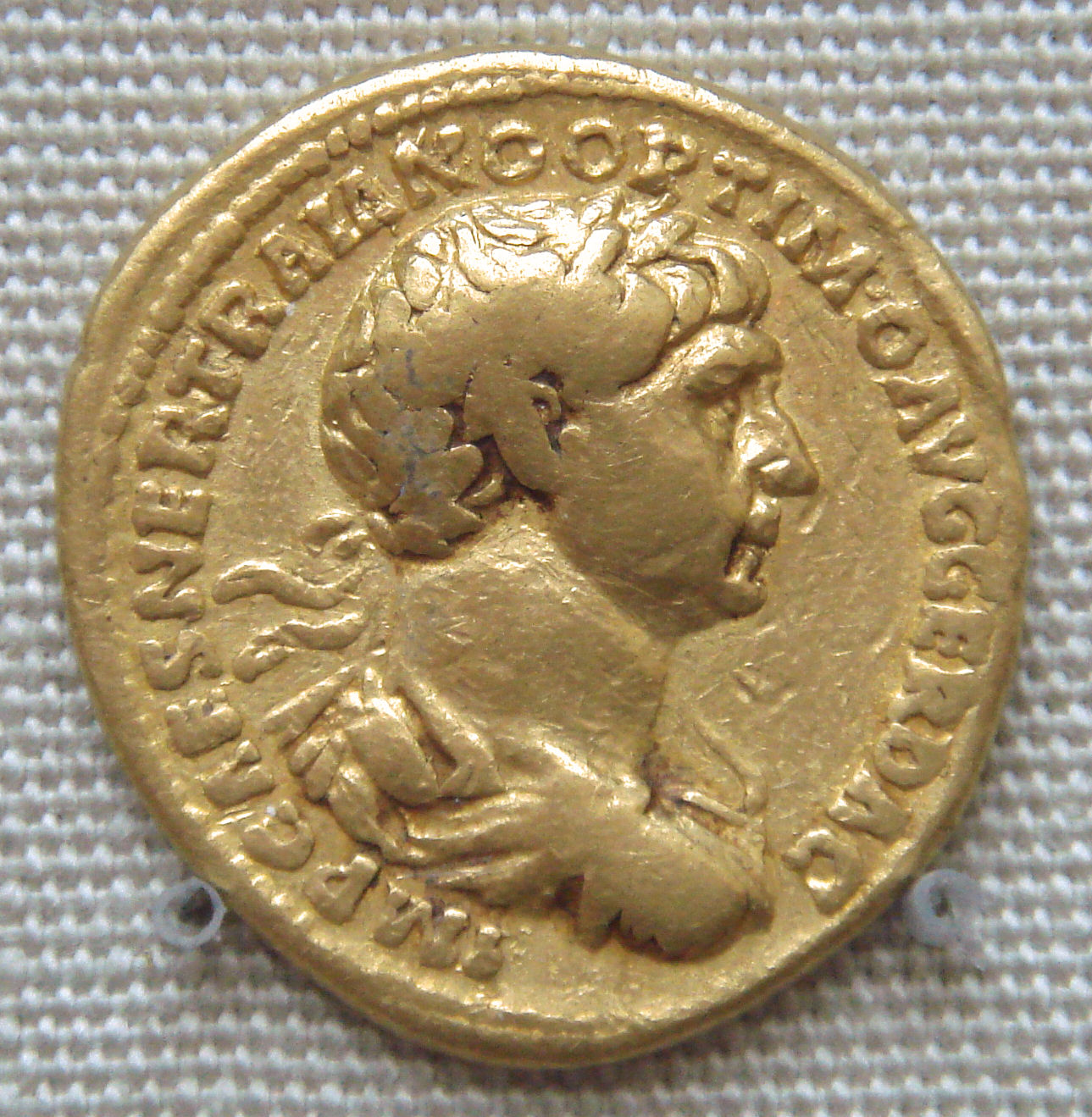
A coin of Trajan, found together with coins of the Kushan ruler Kanishka, at the Ahin Posh Buddhist Monastery, Afghanistan. Caption: IMP. CAES. NER. TRAIANO OPTIMO AVG. GER. DAC.

According to late literary sources (not backed by numismatic or inscriptional evidence) a province of Assyria was also proclaimed, apparently covering the territory of Adiabene. (Note: Various authors have discussed the existence of the province and its location: Maricq (1965, pp. 103, 111) identifies Assyria with Southern Mesopotamia; Lightfoot (1990, pp. 115–126) doubts the actual existence of the province; Bertinelli (1976, pp. 3–45) puts Assyria between Mesopotamia and Adiabene; Lepper (1948, p. 146) considers Assyria and Adiabene to be the same province.) Some measures seem to have been considered regarding the fiscal administration of Indian trade – or simply about the payment of customs (Latin: portoria) on goods traded on the Euphrates and Tigris. It is possible that it was this "streamlining" of the administration of the newly conquered lands according to the standard pattern of Roman provincial administration in tax collecting, requisitions and the handling of local potentates' prerogatives, that triggered later resistance against Trajan.

According to some modern historians, Trajan might have busied himself during his stay on the Persian Gulf with ordering raids on the Parthian coasts, as well as probing into extending Roman suzerainty over the mountaineer tribes holding the passes across the Zagros Mountains into the Iranian plateau eastward, as well as establishing some sort of direct contact between Rome and the Kushan Empire. No attempt was made to expand into the Iranian Plateau itself, where the Roman army, with its relative weakness in cavalry, would have been at a disadvantage.

Trajan left the Persian Gulf for Babylon – where he intended to offer sacrifice to Alexander in the house where he had died in 323 BC – But a revolt led by Sanatruces, a nephew of the Parthian king Osroes I who had retained a cavalry force, possibly strengthened by the addition of Saka archers, imperilled Roman positions in Mesopotamia and Armenia. Trajan sought to deal with this by forsaking direct Roman rule in Parthia proper, at least partially. Trajan sent two armies towards Northern Mesopotamia: the first, under Lusius Quietus, recovered Nisibis and Edessa from the rebels, probably having King Abgarus deposed and killed in the process, with Quietus probably earning the right to receive the honors of a senator of praetorian rank (adlectus inter praetorios). The second army, however, under Appius Maximus Santra (probably a governor of Macedonia) was defeated and Santra killed.

Later in 116, Trajan, with the assistance of Quietus and two other legates, Marcus Erucius Clarus and Tiberius Julius Alexander Julianus, (Note: The last two were made consuls (Latin: suffecti) for the year 117.) defeated a Parthian army in a battle where Sanatruces was killed, possibly with the assistance of Osroes' son and Sanatruces' cousin, Parthamaspates, whom Trajan wooed successfully. After re-taking and burning Seleucia, Trajan then formally deposed Osroes, putting Parthamaspates on the throne as client ruler. This event was commemorated in a coin as the reduction of Parthia to client kingdom status: REX PARTHIS DATUS, "a king is given to the Parthians".

That done, Trajan retreated north in order to retain what he could of the new provinces of Armenia – where he had already accepted an armistice in exchange for surrendering part of the territory to Sanatruces' son Vologeses – and Mesopotamia. It was at this point that Trajan's health started to fail him. The fortress city of Hatra, on the Tigris in his rear, continued to hold out against repeated Roman assaults. He was personally present at the siege, and it is possible that he suffered a heat stroke while in the blazing heat.

=== Diaspora Revolt ===
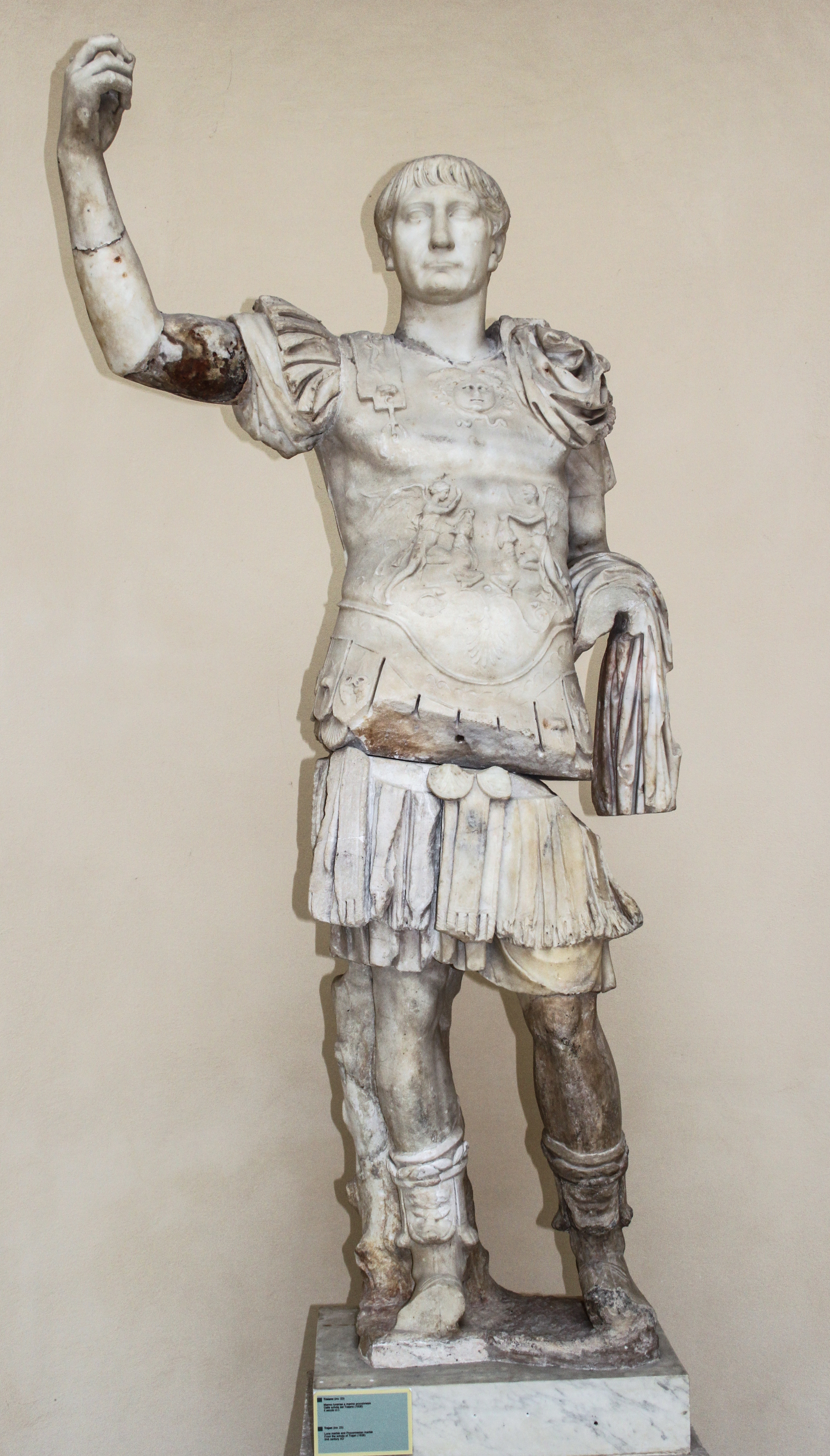
A statue of Trajan, Luna marble and Proconessian marble, 2nd century AD, from Ostia Antica at Museo Archeologico Ostiense

About this same time (AD 116–117), Jews in the Eastern provinces of the Roman Empire—Egypt, Cyprus, and Cyrene, which was likely the original trouble hotspot—rebelled in what appears to have been an ethnic and religious uprising against the local populations, later known as the Diaspora Revolt. Additionally, Jewish communities in Northern Mesopotamia revolted, likely as part of a broader resistance against Roman occupation. Trajan had to withdraw his army to suppress these revolts, a move he considered a temporary setback. He never returned to command, delegating Eastern operations to Lusius Quietus, who was appointed governor of Judaea in early 117 and likely dealt with Jewish unrest there. (Note: A precise description of events in Judea at the time being impossible, due to the non-historical character of the Jewish (rabbinic) sources, and the silence of the non-Jewish ones.)

Quietus discharged his commissions successfully, leading rabbinic sources to name the conflict in Judaea the "Kitos War," with Kitus being a corruption of Quietus. Whether or not the Diaspora revolt included Judea proper, or only the Jewish Eastern diaspora, remains doubtful in the absence of clear epigraphic and archaeological evidence. What is certain is that there was an increased Roman military presence in Judea at the time.

Quietus was promised a consulate (Note: He was already consul in absentia.) in the following year (118) for his victories, but he was killed before this could occur, during the bloody purge that opened Hadrian's reign, in which Quietus and three other former consuls were sentenced to death after being tried on a vague charge of conspiracy by the (secret) court of the Praetorian Prefect Attianus. It has been thought that Quietus and his colleagues were executed on Hadrian's direct orders, for fear of their popular standing with the army and their close connections to Trajan.

In contrast, the next prominent Roman figure in charge of the repression of the Jewish revolt, the equestrian Quintus Marcius Turbo, who had dealt with the rebel leader from Cyrene, Loukuas, retained Hadrian's trust, eventually becoming his Praetorian Prefect. As all four consulars were senators of the highest standing and as such generally regarded as able to take imperial power (capaces imperii), Hadrian seems to have decided to forestall these prospective rivals.

== Death ==
Early in 117, Trajan grew ill and set sail for Italy. His health declined throughout the spring and summer of 117, possibly acknowledged to the public by the display of a bronze portrait-bust at the public baths of Ancyra, showing an aged and emaciated man, though the identification with Trajan is disputed. He reached Selinus, (Note: modern Gazipaşa in Cilicia afterwards called Trajanopolis) where he suddenly died, shortly before 11 August. (Note: Dio states that Trajan ruled "nineteen years, six months and fifteen days", which gives 11 August.(Dio later states that Hadrian ruled exactly "twenty years and eleven month" (using inclusive counting), as in the Historia Augusta. This reign-length is repeated (in corrupted form) by Theophilus of Antioch and Clement of Alexandria) The Historia Augusta claims that Hadrian learned of his adoption on 9 August and received the news of Trajan's death on 11 August. Dio is not reckoning to Trajan's death, but to Hadrian's accession. A travel from Selinus to Antioch would take at least two days, so Trajan probably died around 9 August. This appears to be corroborated by the 10th-century Pseudo-Simeon, who claims that Trajan lived "sixty-eight years, ten months, and twenty-two days", which also gives 9 August. The Chronograph of 354 records his death as 9 July.)

According to a well-established historical tradition, Trajan's ashes were placed within the small cella that still survives at the base of Trajan's column. In some modern scholarship, his ashes were more likely interred near his column, in a mausoleum, temple or tomb built for his cult as a divus of the Roman state.

== Succession ==
Trajan in person could have lawfully nominated Hadrian as his successor, but Dio claims that Trajan's wife, Pompeia Plotina, assured Hadrian's succession by keeping Trajan's death a secret, long enough for her to produce and sign a document attesting to Hadrian's adoption as son and successor. Dio, who tells this narrative, offers his father – the governor of Cilicia Apronianus – as a source, so his narrative may be based on contemporary rumour. It may also reflect male Roman displeasure that an empress – let alone any woman – could presume to meddle in Rome's political affairs.

Hadrian had held an ambiguous position during Trajan's reign. After commanding Legio I Minervia during the Dacian Wars, he had been relieved from front-line duties at the decisive stage of the Second Dacian War, being sent to govern the newly created province of Pannonia Inferior. He had pursued a senatorial career without particular distinction and had not been officially adopted by Trajan although he received from him decorations and other marks of distinction that made him hope for the succession. He received no post after his 108 consulate and no further honours other than being made Archon eponymos for Athens in 111/112. He probably did not take part in the Parthian War.

Literary sources relate that Trajan had considered others, such as the jurist Lucius Neratius Priscus, as heir. Hadrian, who was eventually entrusted with the governorship of Syria at the time of Trajan's death, was Trajan's cousin and was married to Trajan's grandniece, which all made him as good as heir designate. Hadrian seems to have been well connected to the powerful and influential coterie of Spanish senators at Trajan's court, through his ties to Plotina and the Prefect Attianus. His refusal to sustain Trajan's senatorial and expansionist policy during his own reign may account for the "crass hostility" shown him by literary sources.

Hadrian's first major act as emperor was to abandon Mesopotamia as too costly and distant to defend, and to restore Armenia and Osrhoene to Parthian hegemony, under Rome's suzerainty. The Parthian campaign had been an enormous setback to Trajan's policy, proof that Rome had overstretched its capacity to sustain an ambitious program of conquest. According to the Historia Augusta, Hadrian claimed to follow the precedent set by Cato the Elder towards the Macedonians, who "were to be set free because they could not be protected" – something Birley sees as an unconvincing precedent. Other territories conquered by Trajan were retained.

== Legacy ==
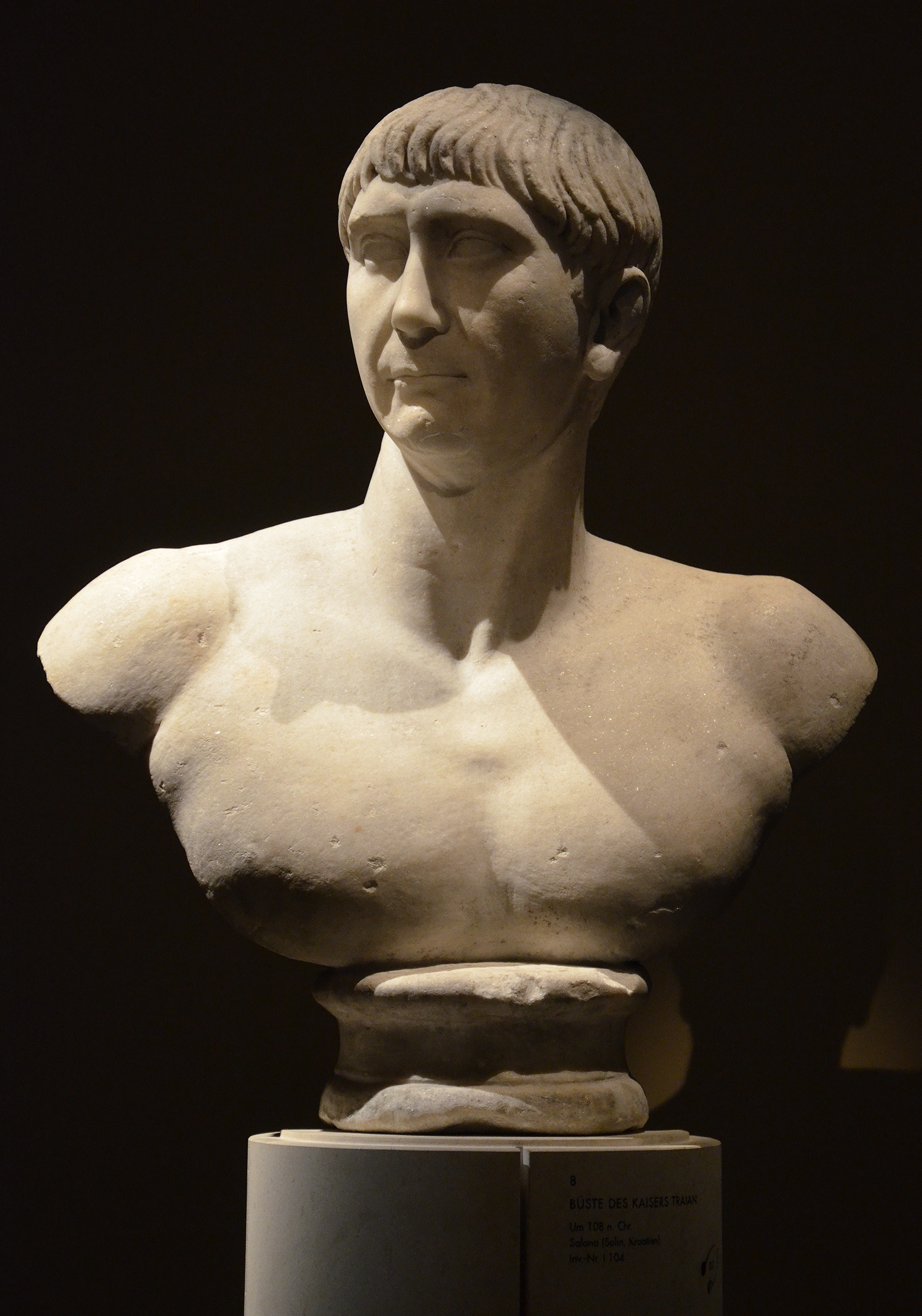
A bust of Trajan found in Salona, in the Museum of Art History in Vienna

Ancient sources on Trajan's personality and accomplishments are unanimously positive. Pliny the Younger, for example, celebrates Trajan in his panegyric as a wise and just emperor and a moral man. Cassius Dio added that he always remained dignified and fair. A third-century emperor, Decius, even received from the Senate the name Trajan as a decoration. In the Later Roman Empire, following the setbacks of the third century, Trajan, together with Augustus, became the paragon of the most positive traits of the Imperial order. Emperors in the 4th century were honoured by the Senate with the acclamation felicior Augusto, melior Traiano ("may you be more fortunate than Augustus and better than Trajan"). The fourth-century emperor Constantine I is credited with calling him a "plant upon every wall" for the many buildings bearing inscriptions with his name.

=== Iconography ===
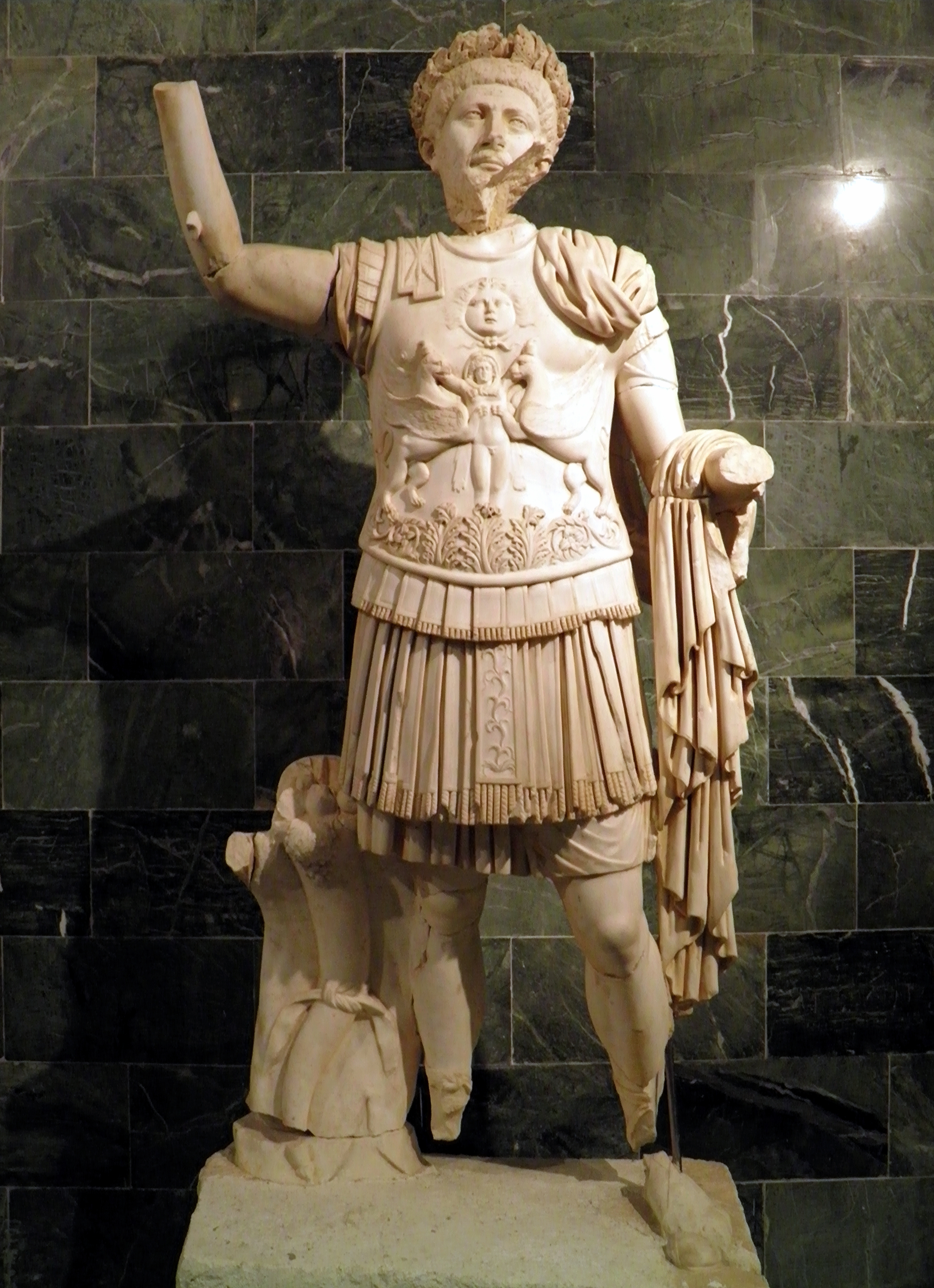
The head of this statue was reworked with a beard in the 3rd century for the theater of Perge. Now at the Antalya Museum in Turkey.

All Roman emperors until Trajan, except Nero who occasionally wore sideburns, were depicted clean-shaven, according to the fashion introduced among the Romans by Scipio Africanus (236 – 183 BC). This Imperial fashion was changed by Trajan's successor Hadrian who made beards fashionable for emperors.

=== In connection with Pope Gregory I ===
During the Middle Ages, a popular legend held that Pope Gregory I was so moved by a story about Trajan's justice towards a widow, he prayed on the emperor's behalf, resulting in Trajan's deliverance from hell without traditional conversion to Christianity during his life. The earliest source is from an anonymous 8th century monk, whose story was rewritten in Johannes Hymonides hagiography of Pope Gregory with a few modifications. This version of the story generally emphasizes the Pope's power over the living and the dead, and is not explicitly about the theological implications of his salvation.

This story was popularized in the twelfth century by humanist authors, who added emphasis on Trajan's deeds earning him sympathy from the Pope. Peter Abelard, the Magdeburg Centuries, Godfrey of Viterbo, and in particular John of Salisbury all wrote of Trajan's personal morality, justice, rational virtue, and wisdom as an epitome of successful political leadership. They generally framed Pope Gregory's intercession on his behalf as a way for the Church to legitimize the achievements of Roman political system.

In the thirteenth century, the story of Trajan evolved into a theological question many theologians engaged with, including William of Auvergne, William of Auxerre, Alexander of Hales, Thomas Aquinas, and Bonaventure. Instead of being concerned with the power of Pope Gregory or virtue of Trajan, they used it to engage with questions such as christian mortalism and prayers for the dead. Notably, Trajan's case was not associated with the question of the virtuous pagans, as he lived after the establishment of Christianity. Aquinas and the other theologians believed Trajan's salvation mechanically came from him getting a second chance at life, even if momentary, to convert to Christianity.

In the Divine Comedy, Trajan appears twice. First, as a marble statue in Purgatorio X, serving as a model for good governance and humility for those in purgatory. His second appearance in Paradiso XX in the Heaven of Jupiter places him with other historical and mythological persons noted for their justice. Dante's version of the story incorporates the perspectives of the thirteenth century theologians as well as the twelfth century humanists — a resuscitation was necessary for his salvation, but Dante places emphasizes on Trajan's righteousness over Pope Gregory's intercession. An eagle explains to Dante the salvation of Trajan and Ripheus, a virtuous pagan who lived before Christ, perhaps reflecting Dante's optimism for the salvation of others who lived virtuous and valuable lives after Christ without being a Christian.

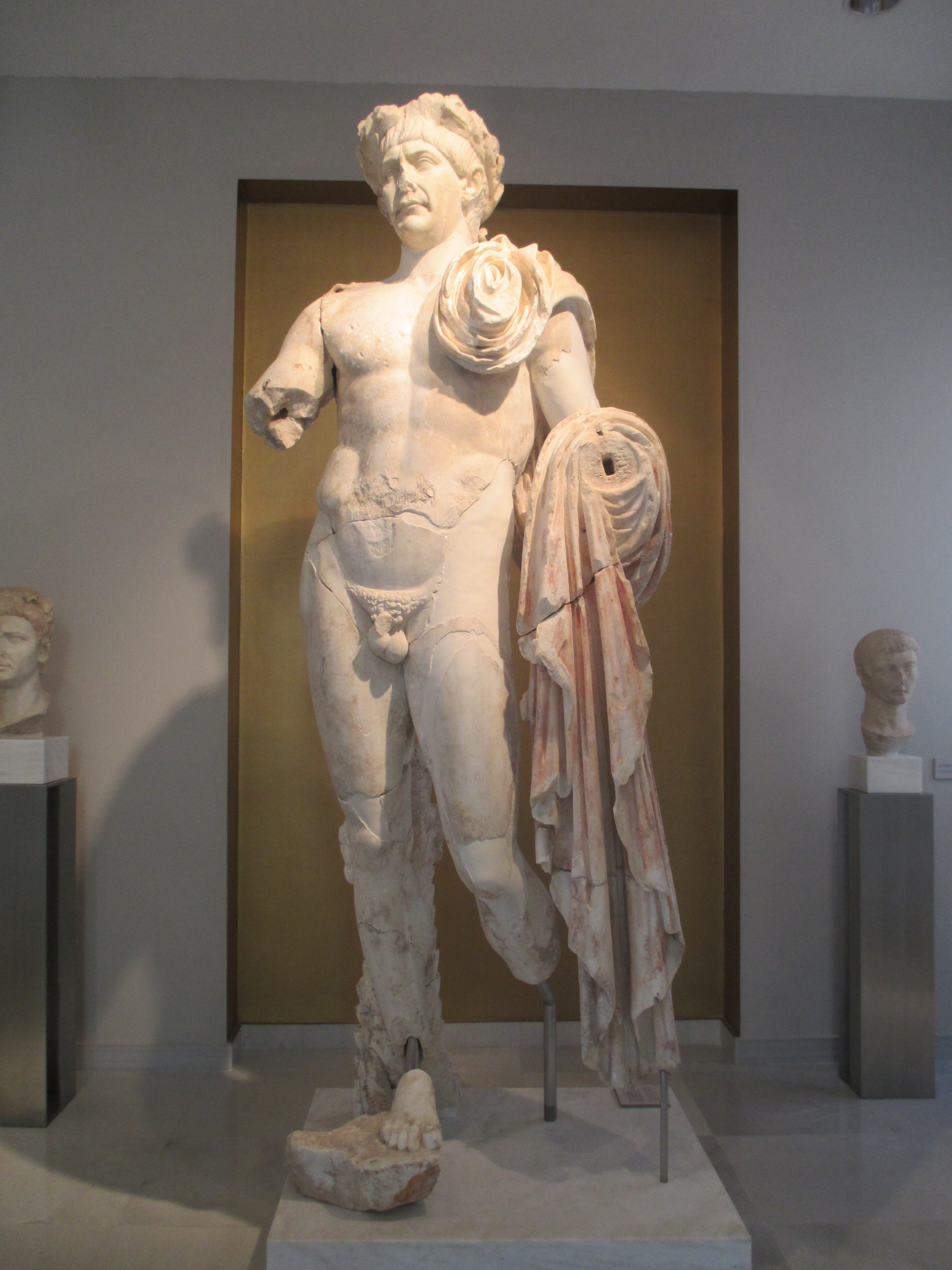
A statue of Trajan depicting him in heroic nudity, Samos, Greece.

The story of Trajan and Pope Gregory also appears in Piers Plowman and John Wyclif's De ecclesia.

=== After Rome ===
In the Renaissance, Machiavelli, speaking on the advantages of adoptive succession over heredity, mentioned the five successive good emperors "from Nerva to Marcus" – a trope out of which the 18th-century historian Edward Gibbon popularized the notion of the Five Good Emperors, of whom Trajan was the second.

In the 18th century, King Charles III of Spain commissioned Anton Raphael Mengs to paint The Triumph of Trajan on the ceiling of the banquet hall of the Royal Palace of Madrid – considered among the best works of this artist.

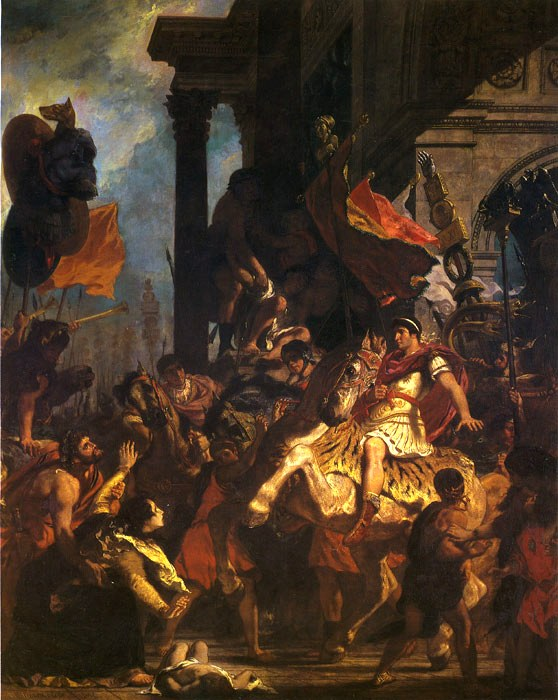
The Justice of Trajan by Eugène Delacroix, 1840

It was only during the Enlightenment that this legacy began to be contested, when Edward Gibbon expressed doubts about the militarized character of Trajan's reign in contrast to the "moderate" practices of his immediate successors. Mommsen adopted a divided stance towards Trajan, at some point of his posthumously published lectures even speaking about his "vainglory" (Scheinglorie). Mommsen also speaks of Trajan's "insatiable, unlimited lust for conquest". Although Mommsen had no liking for Trajan's successor Hadrian – "a repellent manner, and a venomous, envious and malicious nature" – he admitted that Hadrian, in renouncing Trajan's conquests, was "doing what the situation clearly required".

It was exactly this military character of Trajan's reign that attracted his early twentieth-century biographer, the Italian historian Roberto Paribeni, who in his 1927 two-volume biography Optimus Princeps described Trajan's reign as the acme of the Roman principate, which he saw as Italy's patrimony. Following in Paribeni's footsteps, the German historian Alfred Heuss saw in Trajan "the accomplished human embodiment of the imperial title" (die ideale Verkörperung des humanen Kaiserbegriffs). Trajan's first English-language biography by Julian Bennett is also a positive one in that it assumes that Trajan was an active policy-maker concerned with the management of the empire as a whole – something his reviewer Lendon considers an anachronistic outlook that sees in the Roman emperor a kind of modern administrator.

During the 1980s, the Romanian historian Eugen Cizek took a more nuanced view as he described the changes in the personal ideology of Trajan's reign, stressing the fact that it became ever more autocratic and militarized, especially after 112 and towards the Parthian War (as "only an universal monarch, a kosmocrator, could dictate his law to the East"). The biography by the German historian Karl Strobel stresses the continuity between Domitian's and Trajan's reigns, saying that Trajan's rule followed the same autocratic and sacred character as Domitian's, culminating in a failed Parthian adventure intended as the crown of his personal achievement.

It is in modern French historiography that Trajan's reputation becomes most markedly deflated: Paul Petit writes about Trajan's portraits as a "lowbrow boor with a taste for booze and boys". For Paul Veyne, what is to be retained from Trajan's "stylish" qualities was that he was the last Roman emperor to think of the empire as a purely Italian and Rome-centred hegemony of conquest. In contrast, his successor Hadrian would stress the notion of the empire as ecumenical and of the emperor as universal benefactor and not kosmocrator.

=== In Romanian culture ===
In Romania, Trajan (Romanian: Traian) is regarded as one of the founders of the Romanian nation and a historical figure of great importance to the Romanian people and culture. This is due to his orchestration of the Dacian Wars that led to the foundation of the Daco-Roman culture and the Latin-based Romanian language. The creation of Roman Dacia is therefore seen in the country as the ethnogenesis of the Romanian nation.

=== In Jewish legend ===
In the Jewish homiletical works, such as Esther Rabbah, Trajan is described with the epitaph "may his bones be crushed" (Hebrew: שְׁחִיק עֲצָמוֹת, romanized: sh'hik atzamot). The same epitaph is also used for Hadrian.

== Nerva–Antonine family tree ==
Nerva–Antonine family tree

Q. Marcius Barea Soranus	Q. Marcius Barea Sura	Antonia Furnilla	M. Cocceius Nerva	Sergia Plautilla	P. Aelius Hadrianus
Titus (r. 79–81)	Marcia Furnilla	Marcia	Trajanus Pater	Nerva (r. 96–98)	Ulpia (Note: Sister of Trajan's father: Giacosa (1977), p. 7.)	Aelius Hadrianus Marullinus
Flavia (Note: Giacosa (1977), p. 8.)	Marciana (Note: Levick (2014), p. 161.)	C. Salonius Matidius (Note: Husband of Ulpia Marciana: Levick (2014), p. 161.)	Trajan (r. 98–117)	Plotina	P. Acilius Attianus	P. Aelius Afer (Note: Giacosa (1977), p. 7.)	Paulina Major (Note: DIR contributor (Herbert W. Benario, 2000), "Hadrian".)
Lucius Mindius (2)	Libo Rupilius Frugi (3)	Salonia Matidia (Note: Giacosa (1977), p. 9.)	L. Vibius Sabinus (1) (Note: Husband of Salonia Matidia: Levick (2014), p. 161.)
Paulina Minor	L. Julius Ursus Servianus (Note: Smith (1870), "Julius Servianus".)
Matidia Minor	Sabina	Hadrian (Note: Smith (1870), "Hadrian", pp. 319–322.) (r. 117–138)	Antinous (Note: Lover of Hadrian: Lambert (1984), p. 99 and passim; deification: Lambert (1984), pp. 2–5, etc.)
C. Fuscus Salinator I	Julia Serviana Paulina
M. Annius Verus (Note: Husband of Rupilia Faustina: Levick (2014), p. 163.)	Rupilia Faustina (Note: Levick (2014), p. 163.) (Note: It is uncertain whether Rupilia Faustina was Frugi's daughter by Salonia Matidia or another woman.)	Boionia Procilla	Cn. Arrius Antoninus
L. Ceionius Commodus	Appia Severa	C. Fuscus Salinator II
L. Caesennius Paetus	Arria Antonina	Arria Fadilla (Note: Levick (2014), p. 162.)	T. Aurelius Fulvus
L. Caesennius Antoninus	L. Commodus	Plautia	unknown (Note: Levick (2014), p. 164.)	C. Avidius Nigrinus
M. Annius Verus	Calvisia Domitia Lucilla (Note: Wife of M. Annius Verus: Giacosa (1977), p. 10.)	Fundania (Note: Wife of M. Annius Libo: Levick (2014), p. 163.)	M. Annius Libo	Faustina	Antoninus Pius (r. 138–161)	L. Aelius Caesar	Avidia
Cornificia	Marcus Aurelius (r. 161–180) (Note: Giacosa (1977), p. 10.)	Faustina Minor	Aurelia Fadilla	Lucius Verus (r. 161–169) (1)	Ceionia Fabia	Plautius Quintillus (Note: Husband of Ceionia Fabia: Levick (2014), p. 164.)	Q. Servilius Pudens	Ceionia Plautia
Cornificia Minor (Note: Levick (2014), p. 117.)	M. Petronius Sura	Commodus (r. 177–192)	Fadilla	M. Annius Verus Caesar	Ti. Claudius Pompeianus (2)	Lucilla	M. Plautius Quintillus	Junius Licinius Balbus	Servilia Ceionia
Petronius Antoninus	L. Aurelius Agaclytus (2)	Aurelia Sabina	L. Antistius Burrus (1)	Plautius Quintillus	Plautia Servilla	C. Furius Sabinus Timesitheus	Maecia Faustina	Junius Licinius Balbus?
Furia Sabinia Tranquillina	Gordian III (r. 238–244)

- (1) = 1st spouse
- (2) = 2nd spouse
- (3) = 3rd spouse
- Reddish-purple indicates emperor of the Nerva–Antonine dynasty
  lighter purple indicates designated imperial heir of said dynasty who never reigned
  grey indicates unsuccessful imperial aspirants
  bluish-purple indicates emperors of other dynasties
- dashed lines indicate adoption; dotted lines indicate love affairs/unmarried relationships
- Small Caps = posthumously deified (Augusti, Augustae, or other)

Notes:

Except where otherwise noted, the notes below indicate that an individual's parentage is as shown in the above family tree.

References:
- DIR contributors (2000). "De Imperatoribus Romanis: An Online Encyclopedia of Roman Rulers and Their Families".
- Giacosa, Giorgio (1977). Women of the Caesars: Their Lives and Portraits on Coins. Translated by Holloway, R. Ross. Milan: Edizioni Arte e Moneta. ISBN 0-8390-0193-2.
- Lambert, Royston (1984). Beloved and God: The Story of Hadrian and Antinous. New York: Viking. ISBN 0-670-15708-2.
- Levick, Barbara (2014). Faustina I and II: Imperial Women of the Golden Age. Oxford University Press. ISBN 978-0-19-537941-9.
- Smith, William, ed. (1870). Dictionary of Greek and Roman Biography and Mythology.

== See also ==
- Felicior Augusto, melior Traiano
- Justice of Trajan
- Trajanic art

Trajan Nerva–Antonine dynasty Born: 18 September 53 Died: August 117
Regnal titles
Preceded by Nerva	Roman emperor 98–117	Succeeded by Hadrian
Political offices
Preceded by Marcus Tullius Cerialis; Cn. Pompeius Catullinus as suffect consul	Roman consul 91; With: Mn. Acilius Glabrio	Succeeded by Gnaeus Minicius Faustinus; P. Valerius Marinus as suffect consul
Preceded by P. Cornelius Tacitus; M. Ostorius Scapula as suffect consul	Roman consul 98; With: Nerva IV	Succeeded by L. Maecius Postumus as suffect consul
Preceded by A. Cornelius Palma Frontonianus; Q. Sosius Senecio	Roman consul 100; With: Sex. Julius Frontinus	Succeeded by Lucius Julius Ursus as suffect consul
Preceded by L. Roscius Aelianus Maecius Celer; Ti. Claudius Sacerdos Julianus as suffect consul	Roman consul 101; With: Q. Articuleius Paetus	Succeeded by Sex. Attius Suburanus Aemilianus as suffect consul
Preceded by L. Antonius Albus; M. Junius Homullus as suffect consul	Roman consul 103; With: Manius Laberius Maximus	Succeeded by Q. Glitius Atilius Agricola II as suffect consul
Preceded by L. Octavius Crassus; P. Coelius Apollinaris as suffect consul	Roman consul 112; With: T. Sextius Cornelius Africanus	Succeeded by M. Licinius Ruso as suffect consul
