= Tiberius Claudius Sacerdos Julianus =

Roman senator

Tiberius Claudius Sacerdos Julianus was a Roman senator of the second century. He was suffect consul in the nundinium of November–December AD 100 with Lucius Roscius Aelianus Maecius Celer as his colleague. Julianus is primarily known from inscriptions.

Originally a member of the equestrian class, Julianus held a series of appointments in the imperial service. We only know of his last, as procurator, or governor, in Thracia; Nicolay Sharankov estimates his tenure was between the years 85 and 95. In return for his service, Julianus was adlected into the Senate inter praetorios. Shortly after this he was co-opted into the Arval Brethren. Later he was admitted into the College of Pontiffs between the years 98 and 100, one of the four most prestigious ancient Roman priesthoods.

Our knowledge of his life after his consulate is sketchy. Julianus is mentioned in the Acta Arvalia, the records of the Arval Brethren, in 101 when he served as a magister, but when the Acta Arvalia resume in 105 after a lacuna, his name is missing; it is likely Julianus had died by that year.

Political offices
Preceded by Gaius Julius Cornutus Tertullus, and Gaius Plinius Caecilius Secundus as suffect consuls	Suffect consul of the Roman Empire; 100 with Lucius Roscius Aelianus Maecius Celer	Succeeded by Imp. Caesar Nerva Trajanus Augustus IV, and Quintus Articuleius Paetus II as ordinary consuls
