= Venuleia gens =

Patrician family of ancient Rome

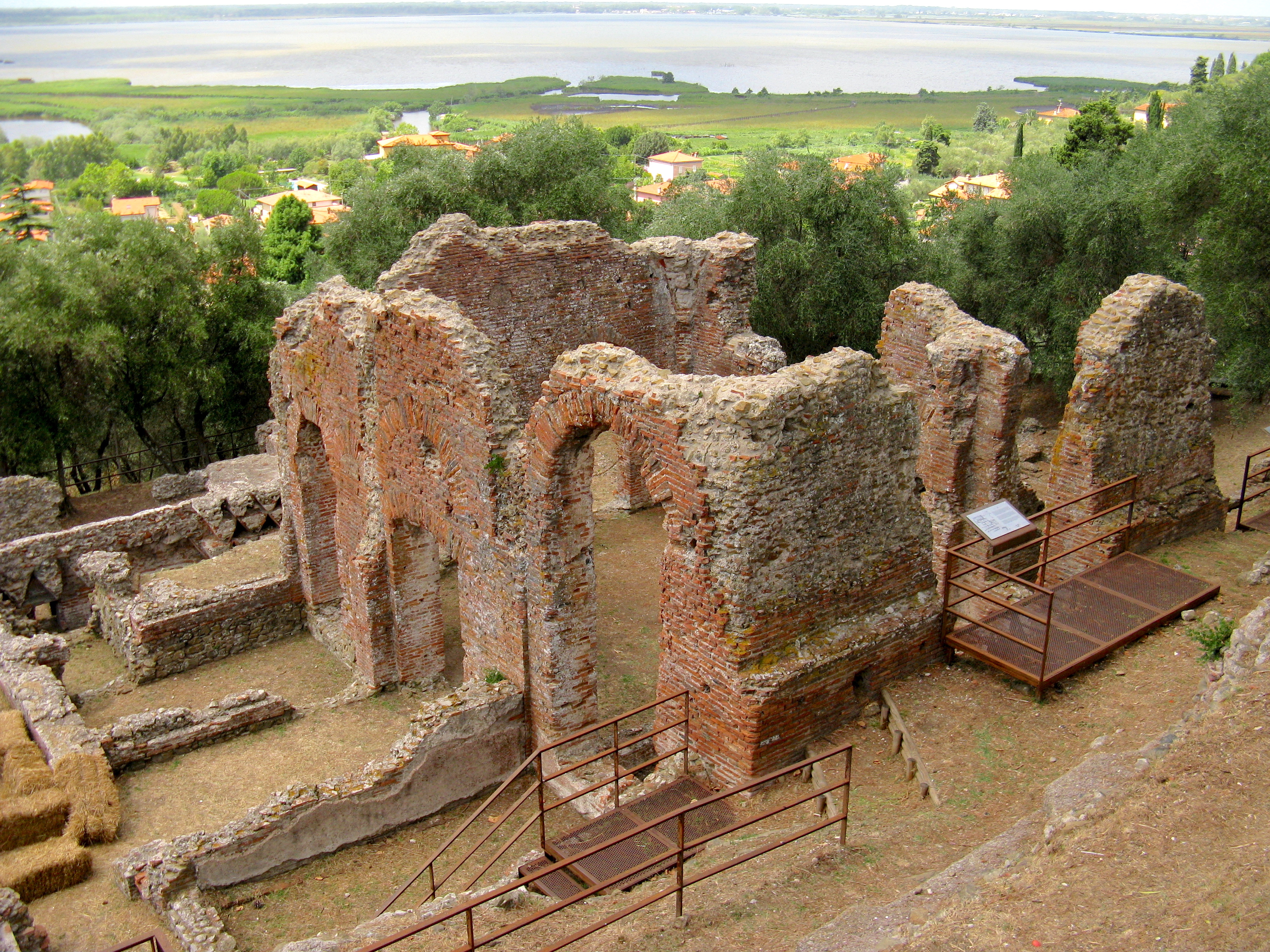
Baths of Villa dei Venuleii (Massaciuccoli)

The gens Venuleia was a patrician family of ancient Rome and of Pisa originally, which flourished from the 1st to the end of the 2nd century AD.

Known members were:

- Lucius Venuleius Montanus was proconsul of Bithynia et Pontus in during the reign of Nero, and described by Juvenal in his fourth satire
- Lucius Venuleius Pataecius, a Roman eques who governed Thracia at some point between AD 69 and 79
- Lucius Venuleius Montanus Apronianus, son of the proconsul, consul in 92.
- Lucius Venuleius consul in 123, possibly son of the consul of 92
- Lucius Venuleius Apronianus Octavius Priscus, son of the consul of 123, consul suffectus around 145 and ordinarius in 168.

The Venuleii family owned the magnificent villa-estate at Massaciuccoli in the 1st and the 2nd century AD.
