= Volusia gens =

Families from Ancient Rome who shared Volusius nomen

The Volusia gens was an ancient Roman family.

== Members ==
- Marcus Volusius, aedile 43 BC; he had been proscribed, but managed to escape in sacerdotal vestments borrowed from a friend who was a votary of the goddess Isis.
- Volusius Vorenius, a centurion associated with Julius Caesar
- Volusius, an annalist mentioned in the poetry of Catullus
- Volusius Proculus, assassinated empress Agrippina and associated with Epicharis of the Pisonian conspiracy of 65
- Lucius Volusius Maecianus, jurist in the second century and father-in-law of the usurper Avidius Cassius
- Volusia Vettia Maeciana, wife of the usurper Avidius Cassius
- Quintus Volusius Flaccus Cornelianus, consul of 174
- Volusius Venustus, politician of the fourth century
- Lucius Volusius Successus, whose mausoleum is underneath the Vatican Necropolis

=== Volusii Saturnini ===
- Quintus Volusius (Saturninus), prefect of Cicero from 51 BC to 50 BC, married Claudia the aunt of emperor Tiberius
- Lucius Volusius Saturninus, cousin of emperor Tiberius and suffect consul of 12 BC
- Volusia Saturnina, daughter of the consul and mother of empress Lollia Paulina
- Lucius Volusius Saturninus, suffect consul in AD 3 and lived over 90 years from 38 BC-AD 56
- Lucius Volusius Saturninus, a member of the College of Pontiffs who died in 55
- Quintus Volusius Saturninus, consul of 56
- Volusia Cornelia, daughter of Quintus Volusius Saturninus consul of 56
- Lucius Volusius Saturninus, Augur and Suffect consul who lived in ca. 80
- Lucius Volusius Saturninus, consul of 87
- Quintus Volusius Saturninus, consul of 92

== See also ==
- List of Roman gentes
- Licinia Cornelia Volusia Torquata
