= Lucius Volusius Saturninus =

Lucius Volusius Saturninus was the name of several Ancient Romans:

- Lucius Volusius Saturninus (suffect consul 12 BC) (c. 60 BC – AD 20), Roman senator, suffect consul in 12 BC, governor of Africa c. 8-4 BC, governor of Syria 4 BC – AD 5.
- Lucius Volusius Saturninus (suffect consul 3) (38/7 BC – AD 56), Roman senator, suffect consul in AD 3, proconsul of Anatolia in AD 9–10, legatus pro praetore of Illyricum and Dalmatia.
- Lucius Volusius Saturninus (pontiff) (d. c. AD 55), member of the College of Pontiffs.
- Lucius Volusius Saturninus (consul 87) (fl. AD 87), Roman senator, consul in AD 87.
- Lucius Volusius Saturninus (Augur), (fl. first half 2nd century AD), augur and suffect consul.
