= List of libraries in the ancient world =

The great libraries of the ancient world served as archives for empires, sanctuaries for sacred writings, and depositories of literature and chronicles.

== Ancient Near East ==
The Royal Library of Ebla (2500–2350 B.C.) in modern Syria.
20,000 cuneiform tablets and fragments, dated to 2500–2350 B.C., were found in the Royal Library of Ebla.
Bogazköy Archive (1900–1190 B.C.), Hattusa (modern Bogazkoy)
This archive contains the largest collection of Hittite texts ever discovered, with approximately thirty thousand inscribed cuneiform tablets. The tablets had also been classified according to a precise system.
The Library of Ashurbanipal (established 668–627 B.C.) in Nineveh (near modern Mosul, Iraq)
Long considered the first systematically collected library, it was rediscovered in the 19th century. While the library had been destroyed, many fragments of ancient cuneiform tablets survived, and have been reconstructed. Large portions of The Epic of Gilgamesh were among the recovered texts.
Nuzi (modern Yorgan Tepe) (1500 B.C.)
This archive consisted of over 6,000 tablets written primarily in Babylonian cuneiform; however, a select few were composed in the indigenous Hurrian language.
Ugarit (modern Ras Shamra, Syria) (1200 B.C.)
Several thousand texts, including diplomatic archives, census records, literary works and the earliest privately owned libraries ever recovered. Even though the tablets were written in several different languages, the most important aspect of the library was the 1,400 texts written in Ugaritic, unknown when the library was discovered in 1928.
Tell Leilan (Northeast Syria) (1900 B.C.)
This archive housed over a thousand clay tablets.
Mari (modern Tell Hariri, Syria) (1900 B.C.)
The archive held approximately 15,000 tablets which included works on litigation, letters, foreign negotiations, literary, and theological works.
The Academy of Gondishapur in western Iran, established during the Persian Sassanid Empire in the 3rd through 6th centuries.
The breadth of this institution was enormous and included a university, teaching hospital, and a library with over 400,000 titles. The academy was the epitome of the Sassanid Empire with its faculty proficient in the conventions of Zoroastrianism and ancient Persian as well as classical Indian scholarship.
Sarouyeh
A large library in ancient pre-Islamic Iran, near Isfahan, of uncertain date possibly dating back to the Pishdadian dynasty.

== Classical Antiquity ==
The Library of Alexandria (fl. 285–145 B.C.)
This library was part of a larger research institution called the Mouseion, which was dedicated to the Muses, the nine goddesses of the arts during the reign of Ptolemy II Philadelphus. The Library quickly acquired many papyrus scrolls, possibly ranging from 40,000 to 400,000 at its height. The library's decline began under Ptolemy VIII in 145 B.C., who appointed a palace guard as head librarian as a political favor. A part or all of the Library's collection may have been accidentally burned during Caesar's Civil War in 48 B.C., but it is unclear how much was actually destroyed. While Plutarch relates that the entire library was destroyed, Dio Cassius says that only the storehouses along the docks containing great numbers of books were destroyed. Given numerous accounts of the library's use in the Roman period, it is likely, however, that the entire library was not destroyed. Casson concludes that the library was likely destroyed by Aurelian in 270 AD, during the Palmyran war, when the entire city was destroyed.
Temple of Edfu Archive/Library (237–57 B.C.)
This library was an extension of the Temple itself. The walls of this chamber are bestrewn with engravings and captions depicting numerous receptacles filled with manuscripts of papyrus as well as scrolls bound in leather. These documents chronicled the circadian workings of the temple, but also detailed construction drafts and directives on how the temple walls should be decorated.
Royal Library of Antioch (221 B.C. – 363 A.D.) (modern Antakya)
The library was commissioned in the third century B.C. by Antiochus III the Great and placed under the supervision of Euphorion of Chalcis . Euphorion, a distinguised poet and scholar, served as library's chief librarian.
Library of Pergamum (197–159 B.C.) (modern Bergama)
The Attalid kings formed the second-best Hellenistic library after Alexandria, founded in emulation of the Ptolemies. Parchment, a predecessor of vellum and paper, was widely used in the library, and is believed to have been discovered here. The library, it is estimated, amassed over 200,000 volumes, making it the second largest ancient library.
Libraries of the Forum
Consisted of separate libraries founded in the time of Augustus near the Roman Forum that contained both Greek and Latin texts, separately housed, as was the conventional practice. Libraries were located in the Porticus Octaviae near the Theatre of Marcellus, in the Temple of Apollo Palatinus, and in the Bibliotheca Ulpia in the Forum of Trajan.
Atrium Liberatatis
Originally served as the archive of the censors before being restored by Asinius Pollio and converted into a public library.
The Villa of the Papyri, in Herculaneum, Italy
The Villa of the Papyri is the only library known to have survived from classical antiquity. This villa's large private collection may have once belonged to Julius Caesar's father-in-law, Lucius Calpurnius Piso Caesoninus in the 1st century B.C. Buried by the eruption of Mount Vesuvius in 79 AD, the villa was rediscovered in 1752. Around 1,800 carbonized scrolls were found in its upper story. Using modern techniques such as multi-spectral imaging, previously illegible or invisible sections on scrolls that have been unrolled are now being deciphered. It is possible that more scrolls remain to be found in the lower, unexcavated levels of the villa.
Kos Library (Kos) (100 A.D.)
The library was a local public library situated on the island of Kos and known as a crossroads for academia and philosophical faculties. A record of individuals who were supposedly responsible for the establishment of the library are acknowledged in an inscription near the monument.
The Library of Pantainos (Athens) (100 A.D.)
Dedicated to both Athena Archegetis and the Roman emperor Trajan, the library was connected to the Agora in Athens. Titus Flavius Pantainos had it built, and he, along with his children, also devoted it to the citizens of Athens, according to the stone inscription found in the main entrance of the library. While the precise date of its dedication is not clear, it is believed to have been dedicated between 98 AD and 102 AD. There is speculation that the library may have actually been built by the father of Pantainos. Being a Roman-period library, the design is quite unconventional. A spacious alcove with an adjoining courtyard enclosed by three galleries formed the arrangement of the structure. An inscription discovered dictates proper library etiquette: "No book is to be taken out because we have sworn an oath. The library is to be open first hour until the sixth." The library was ultimately consumed by the invading Germanic Heruli tribe in 267 AD.
The Library of Rhodes (Rhodes) (100 A.D.)
The library on the island of Rhodes was a distinct component of the larger gymnasium structure. An enclosure that had been excavated revealed a section of a catalog analogous to modern library catalogs. The catalog, which classified titles by subject, displayed an inventory of authors in consecutive order together with their published efforts. It has also been determined that the library employed a qualified librarian.
Hadrian's Library (Athens) (132 A.D.)
It was created by Roman Emperor Hadrian on the north side of the Acropolis of Athens. The library was seriously damaged by the Herulian invasion of 267 and repaired later. During Byzantine times, three churches were built at the site, the remains of which are preserved.
Library of Celsus (135–262 A.D.) (located within the city of Ephesus)
This library was part of the triumvirate of libraries in the Mediterranean which included the aforementioned Library of Pergamum and the great Library of Alexandria. The library was actually a tomb and a shrine for the deceased Tiberius Julius Celsus Polemaeanus for whom the library is named. 12,000 volumes were collected at this library which were deposited in several cabinets along the wall.
Timgad (250 A.D.) (modern Algeria)
The library was a gift to the Roman people and province of Thamugadi or Timgad by Julius Quintianus Flavius Rogatianus in the third century. The library contained an expansive arched hall which consisted of a reading room, stack room, and a rotunda for lectures. The library was large measuring 81 feet (25 m) in length by 77 feet (23 m) in width. Oblong alcoves held wooden cabinets along walls of which the manuscripts were maintained. In addition, there is evidence for free-standing bookcases in the center as well as a reading desk. There is no evidence as to how many books the library held although it is estimated that it could have accommodated 3000 scrolls.
The Theological Library of Caesarea Maritima
A late 3rd century A.D. establishment, was a great early Christian library. Through Origen of Alexandria and the scholarly priest Pamphilus of Caesarea, the school won a reputation for having the most extensive ecclesiastical library of the time, containing more than 30,000 manuscripts: Gregory of Nazianzus, Basil the Great, Jerome and others came to study there.
The Imperial Library of Constantinople (337–361 A.D. – 29 May 473) (Constantinople, modern Istanbul)
The library was established by Constantius II who was the son of the first Christian emperor Constantine. Constantius requested that the rolls of papyrus should be copied onto parchment or vellum in order that they would be preserved. Some assessments place the collection at just over 100,000 volumes which included papyrus scrolls and codices bound in parchment, although 120,000 volumes had been destroyed in a fire in a.d. 473.

== Ancient China ==
Han Imperial Library
Catalogue preserved in the Yiwenzhi chapter of the Book of Han. At the time of inventory contained 13,269 scrolls divided into six genres: scripture, philosophy, poetry, warfare, astrology, and medicine.
Academy Libraries
Private collections mostly in the Tang Dynasty (6th to 10th century) opened to young men studying for the civil service exam. These libraries, the civil service tests, and objective evaluations were part of the meritocracy, or merit-based system of promotion in ancient China for civil service.
Mogao Grottoes or Cave of "The Thousand Buddhas"
The Library Cave contained 15,000 paper books and 1,100 paper bundles of scrolls. It was created during the 8th century and sealed during the 11th century.

== See also ==
- List of destroyed libraries
- Apellicon of Teos
