= Volusius =

Volusius or Volusia may refer to:

== People ==
- Volusius, an annalist mentioned in the poetry of Catullus

== Places ==
- Volusia, Florida, an unincorporated community
- Volusia County, Florida, a county in east-central Florida

== See also ==
- Volusia gens, an ancient Roman gente
