= Library of Celsus =

Ancient Roman building in Ephesus, Anatolia

Coordinates: 37°56′20.9″N 27°20′26.7″E

- Βιβλιοθήκη του Κέλσου (Greek)
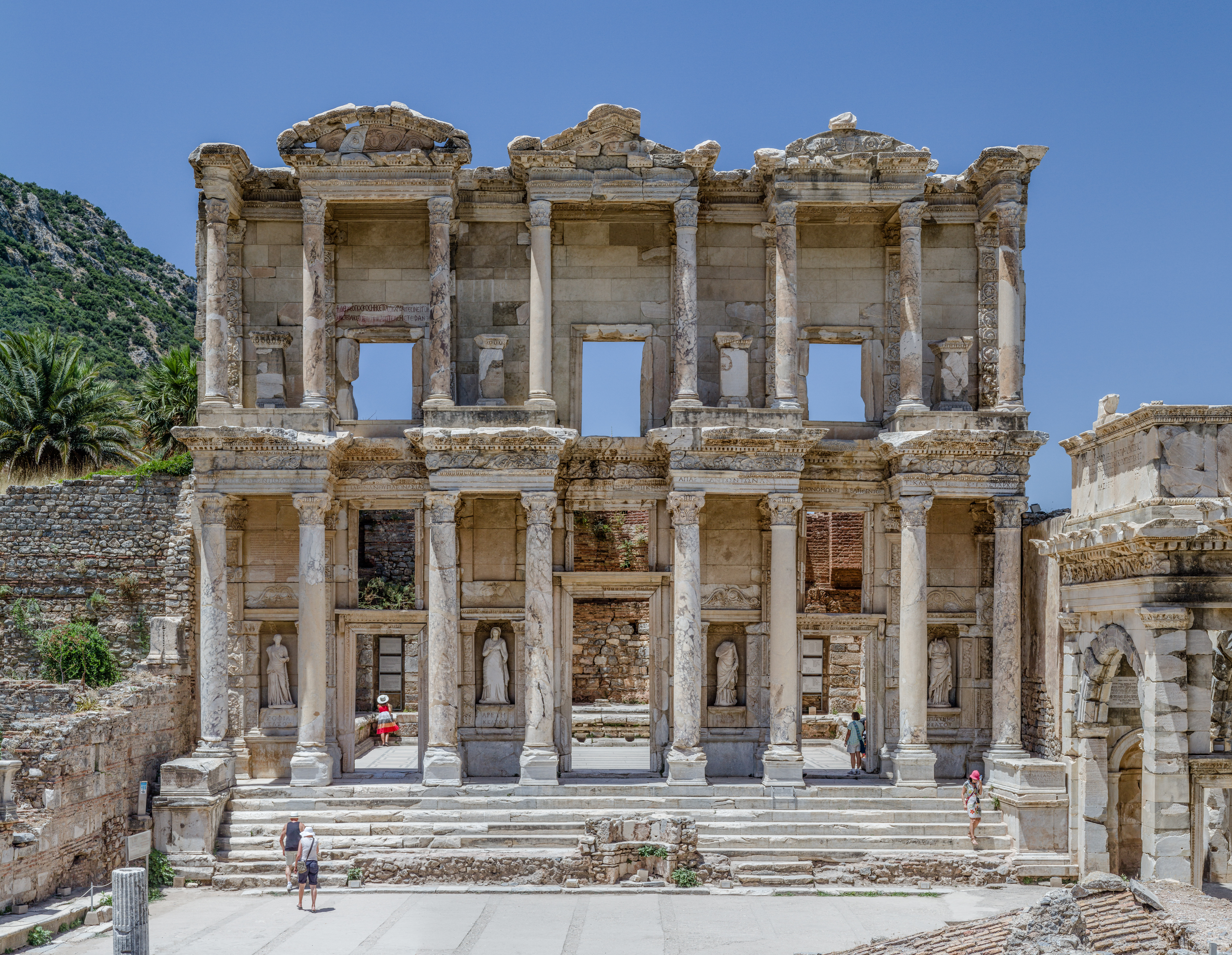
- Façade of the Library of Celsus

- Location within Turkey
- Type: National library
- Cultures: Greek, Roman
- Location: Ephesus
- Region: Aegean
- Part of: Ancient Greece, Ancient Rome

Site notes
- Excavation dates: 1903–1904, restored 1970–1978
- Archaeologists: Volker Michael Strocka
- Condition: partly restored ruins
- Public access: Archaeological site

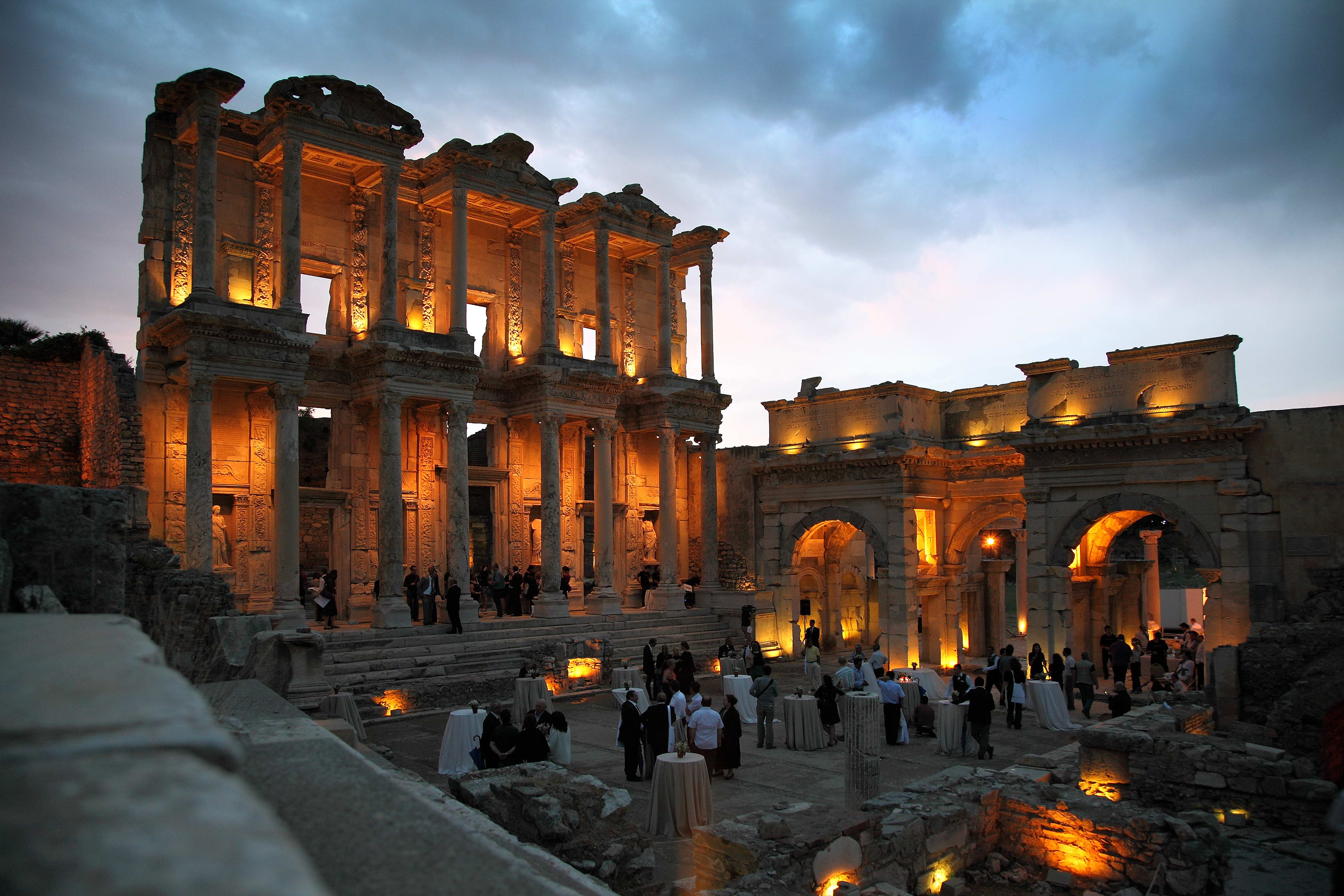
Façade of the Library of Celsus at sunset

The Library of Celsus (Greek: Βιβλιοθήκη του Κέλσου) is an ancient Roman building in Ephesus, Anatolia, located near the modern town of Selçuk, in the İzmir Province of western Turkey. The building was commissioned in the years 110s CE by a consul of the Roman Empire, Tiberius Julius Aquila Polemaeanus, as a funerary monument for his father Tiberius Julius Celsus Polemaeanus, former proconsul of Asia, and completed during the reign of the Roman Emperor Hadrian, sometime after Aquila's death.

The Library of Celsus is considered an architectural marvel, and is one of the few remaining examples of great libraries of the ancient world located in the Roman Empire. It was the third-largest library in the Greco-Roman world behind only those of Alexandria and Pergamum, and is believed to have held around 12,000 scrolls. Celsus is buried in a crypt beneath the library in a decorated marble sarcophagus. The interior measured roughly 180 square metres (2,000 square feet).

The interior of the library and its contents were destroyed in a fire that resulted either from an earthquake or a Gothic invasion in 262 CE, and the façade by an earthquake in the 10th or 11th century. It lay in ruins for centuries until the façade was re-erected by archaeologists between 1970 and 1978.

== History ==
Celsus enjoyed a successful military and political career, having served as a commander in the Roman army before being elected to serve as a consul for the Roman Empire in 92 CE. Celsus, a Romanized Greek native of Sardis or Ephesus who belonged to a family of priests of Rome, was one of the first men from the Greek-speaking eastern provinces of the Roman Republic to serve as a consul, the highest elected office in Imperial Rome. He may have been the first Greek to become a Roman senator, however there is scholarly debate that this may or may not be true. He was later appointed as proconsul, or governor, of Asia, the Roman province that covered roughly the same area as modern-day Turkey. Celsus served as a Roman senator, consul, and praetor, rising through the ranks very quickly. He then retired and returned to Ephesus, his home.

After Celsus' death, his son Tiberius Julius Aquila Polemaeanus commissioned the library in his father's honor, using Greek and Roman techniques. However, it was not completed until after Aquila's death. An inscription records that Celsus left a large legacy of 25,000 denarii to pay for the library's reading material. In Ancient Roman culture, the wealthy and privileged were expected to act as benefactors, and use their wealth for the greater good of the community. This Roman belief expanded to other Roman territories and provinces, such as the Greek city of Ephesus, where Aquila built the library in honor of his father, but also to benefit Ephesus as a whole. The library itself also embodies Roman values of sharing knowledge and growing literacy.

Celsus' family most likely became citizens of the Roman Empire under the reign of the Roman Emperor Tiberius (14–37 CE), as he is named after Tiberius, which may have been to pay homage to the Emperor. The library operated as a public space for the city from its completion around 117–135 until 262 CE. The main floor functioned as a reading room, lit by abundant natural light from the eastern windows. Shelves or armaria set into niches along the walls held papyrus book rolls that visitors could read, though borrowing would not have been permitted because copies of books were rare and labor-intensive to produce. Additional scrolls may have been held in free-standing book boxes placed around the room, in which case the library would have had a holding capacity of up to sixteen thousand scrolls.

The interior and contents of the library were destroyed by fire in 262 CE, though it remains unknown whether this fire was the result of natural disaster or a Gothic invasion, as it seems the city was struck by one of each that year. Only the façade survived, until an earthquake in the 10th or 11th century left it in ruins as well. Between 1970 and 1978, a reconstruction campaign was led by the German archaeologist Volker Michael Strocka. Strocka analysed the fragments that had been excavated by Austrian archaeologists between 1903 and 1904. In the meantime, some of the architectural elements had been acquired by museums in Vienna and Istanbul. The absent fragments had to be replaced by copies or left missing. Only the façade was rebuilt, while the rest of the building remains in ruin.

== Gallery ==
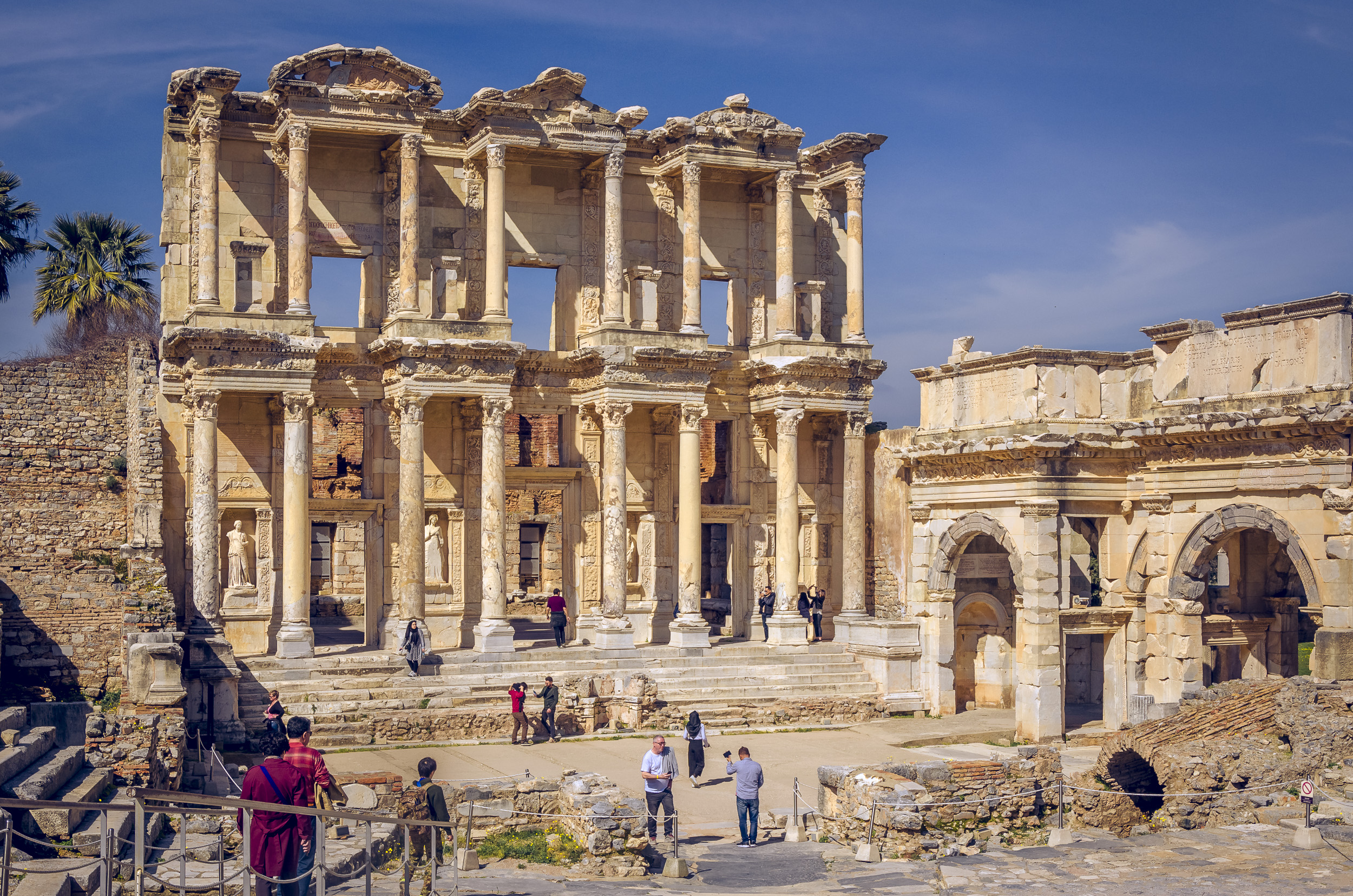
Side view of the Library of Celsus

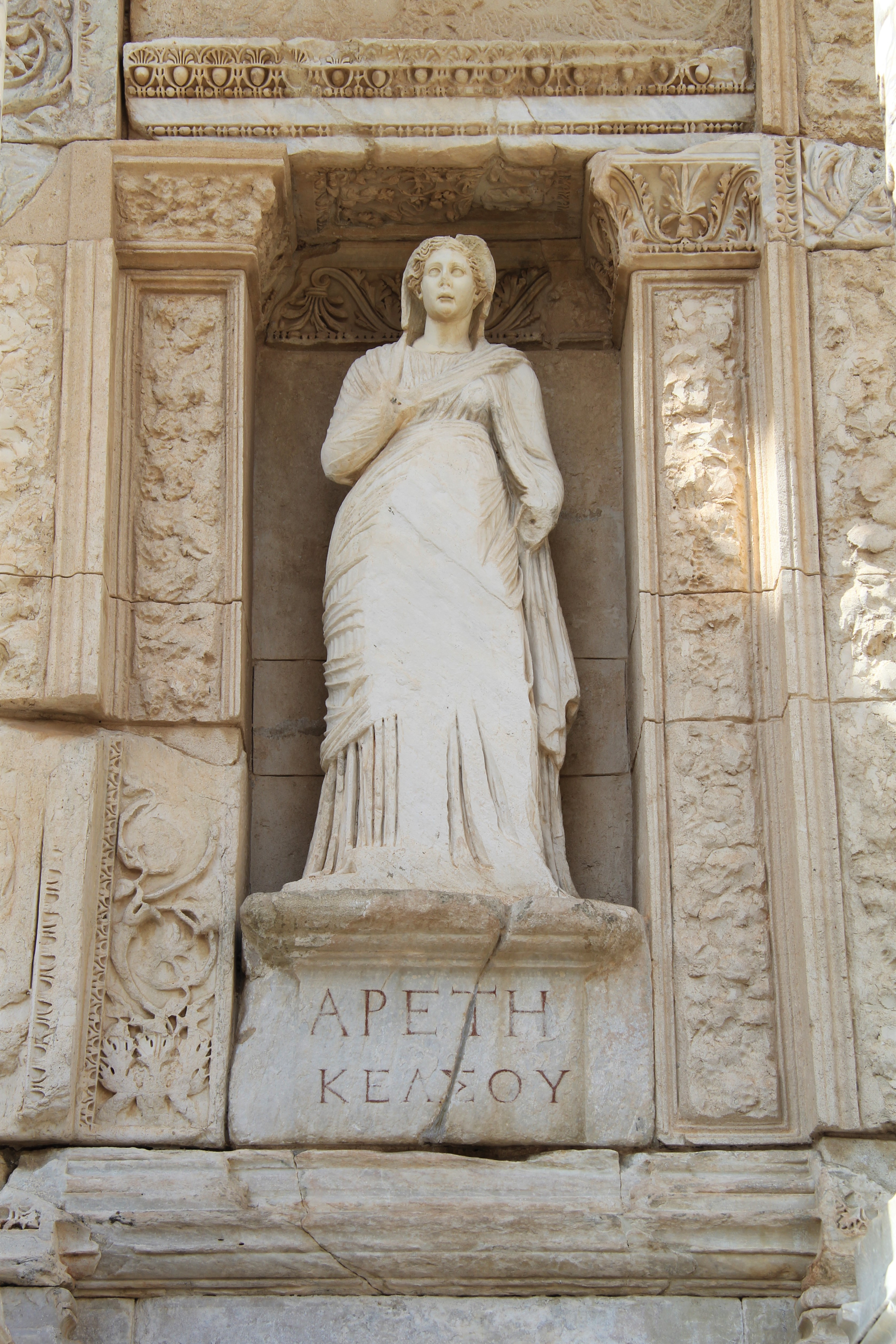
Statue of Arete, Greek personification of virtue in the Library of Celsus

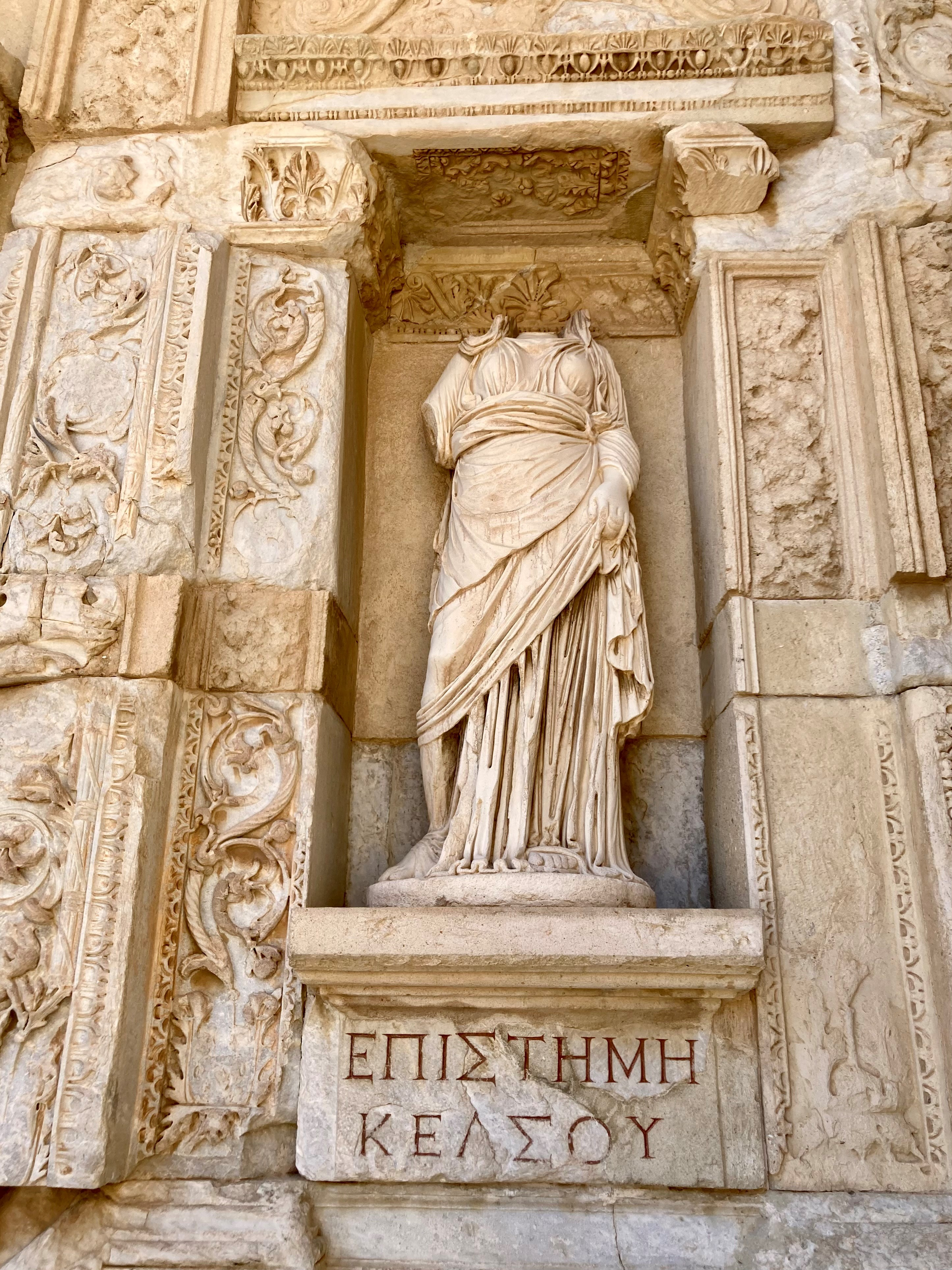
Statue of Episteme, Greek personification of knowledge in the Library of Celsus

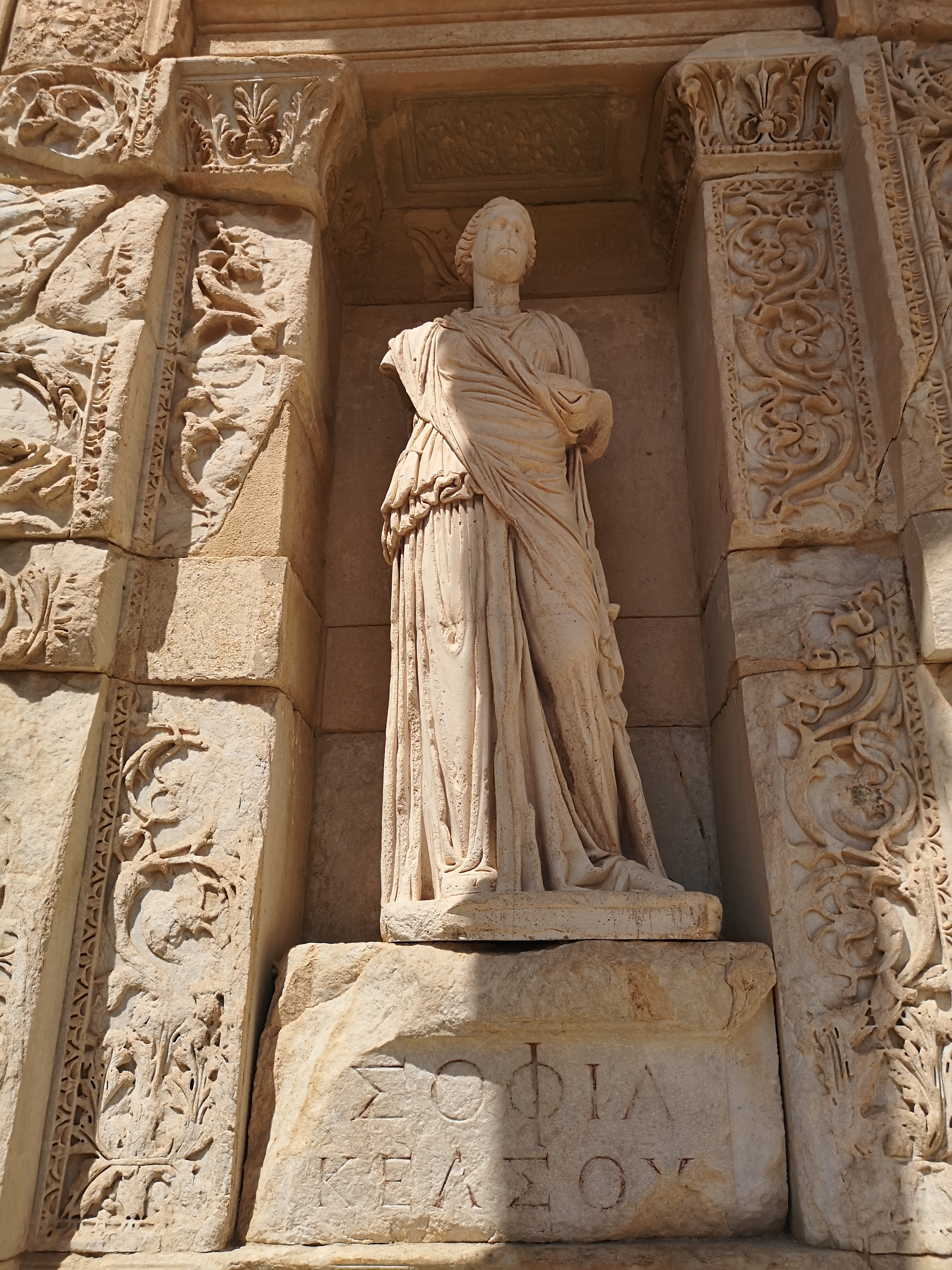
Statue of Sophia, personification of wisdom in the Library of Celsus

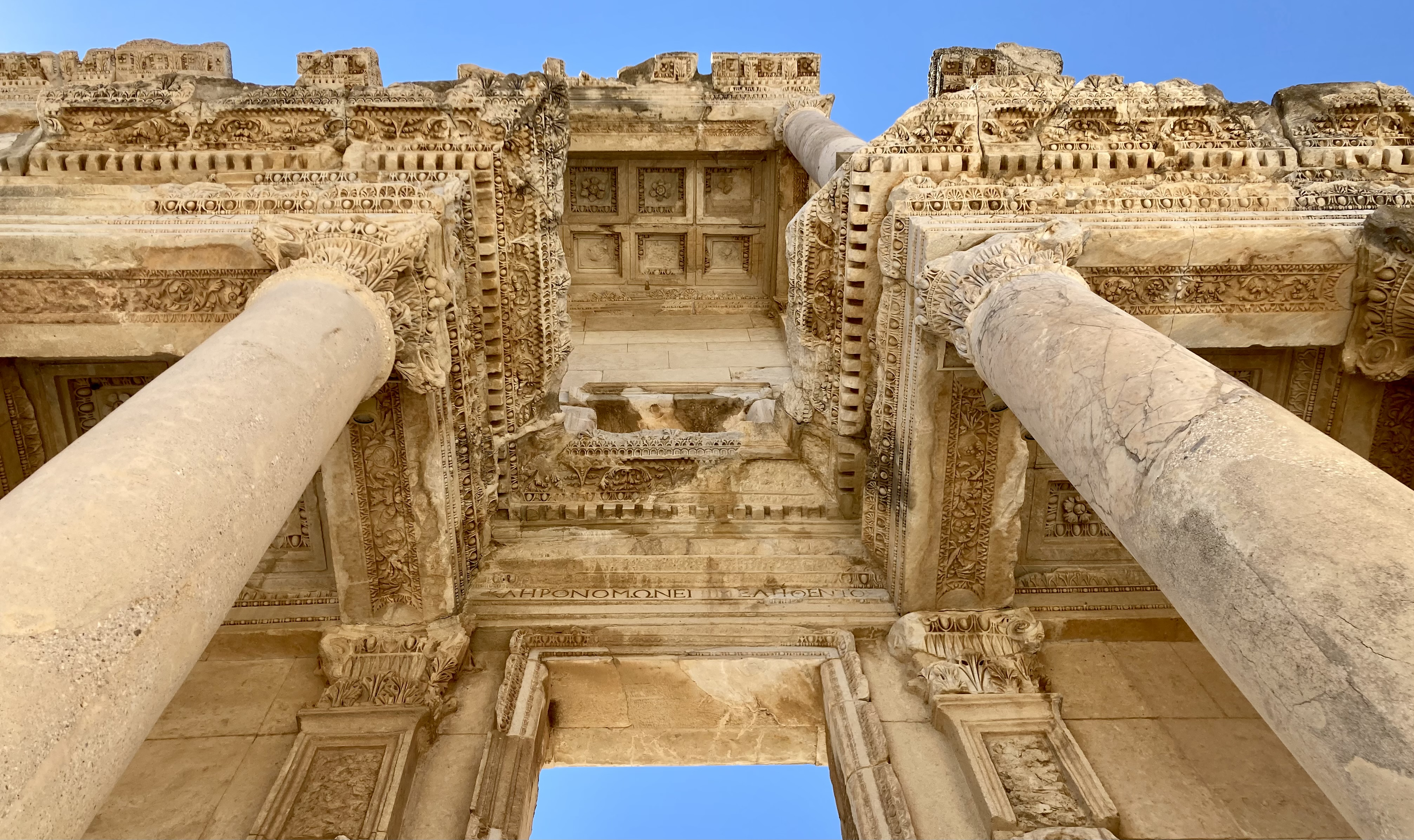
Architectural design of the Library

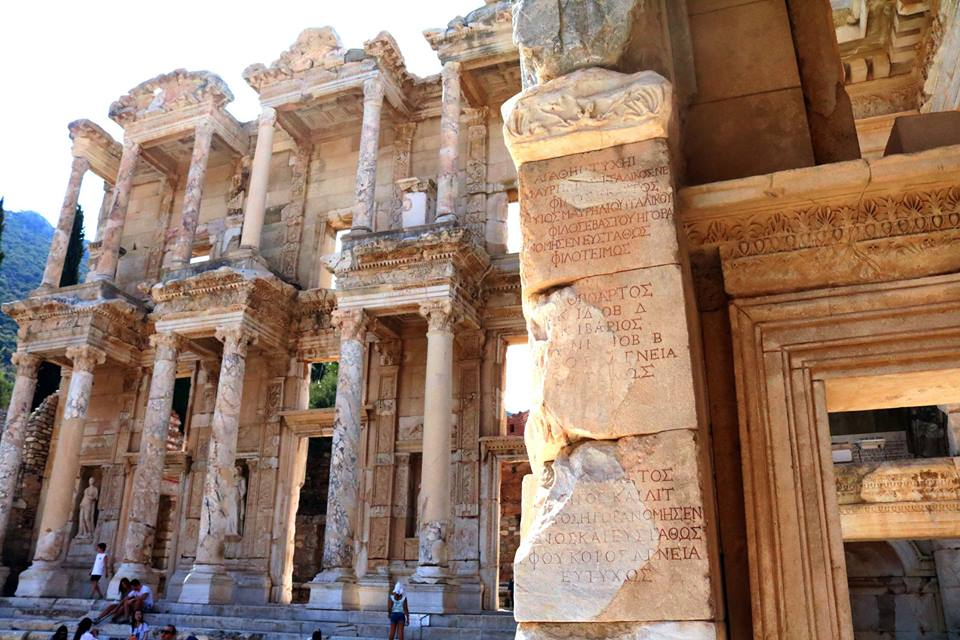
Greco-Roman inscription

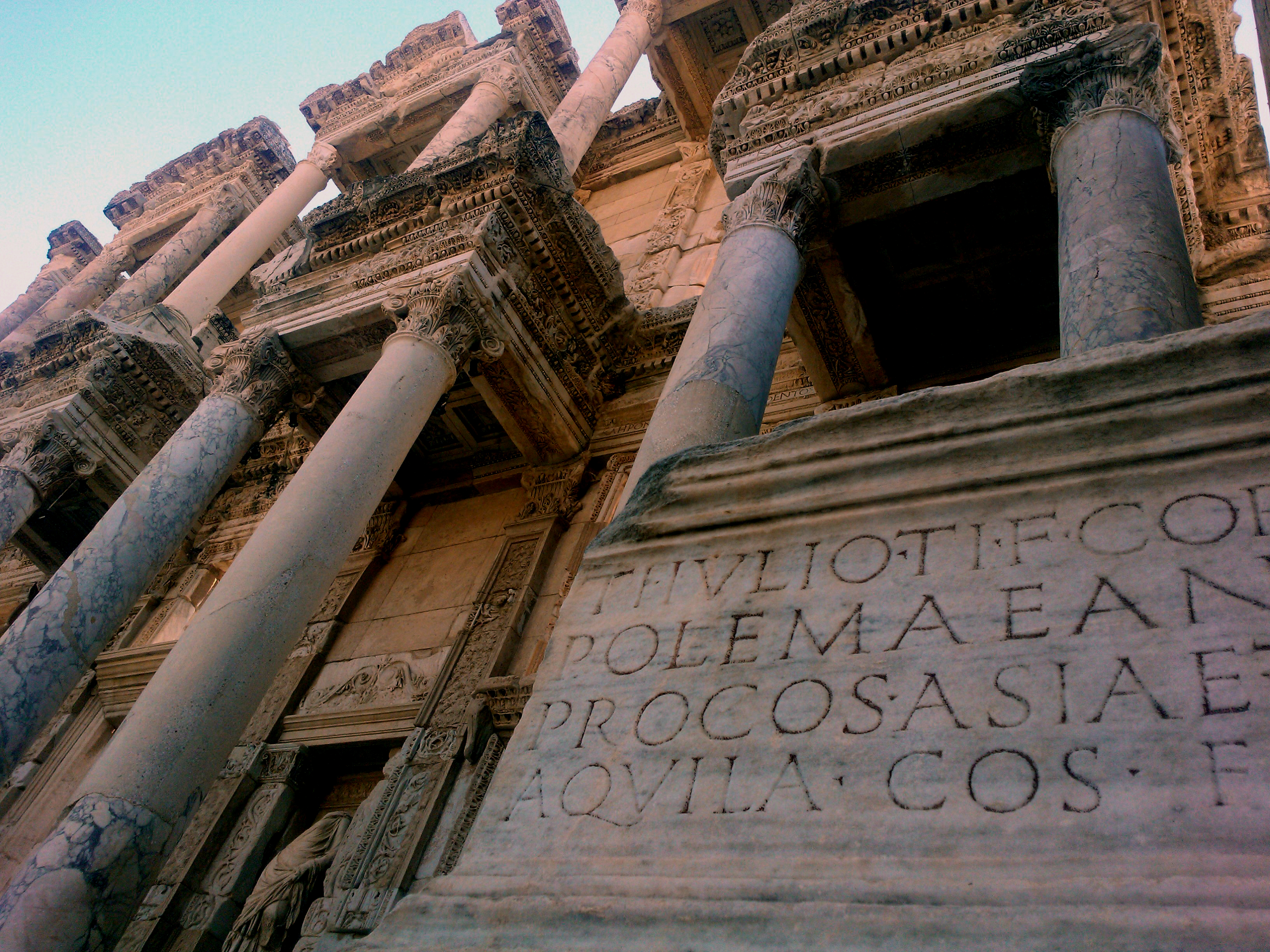
Latin inscription

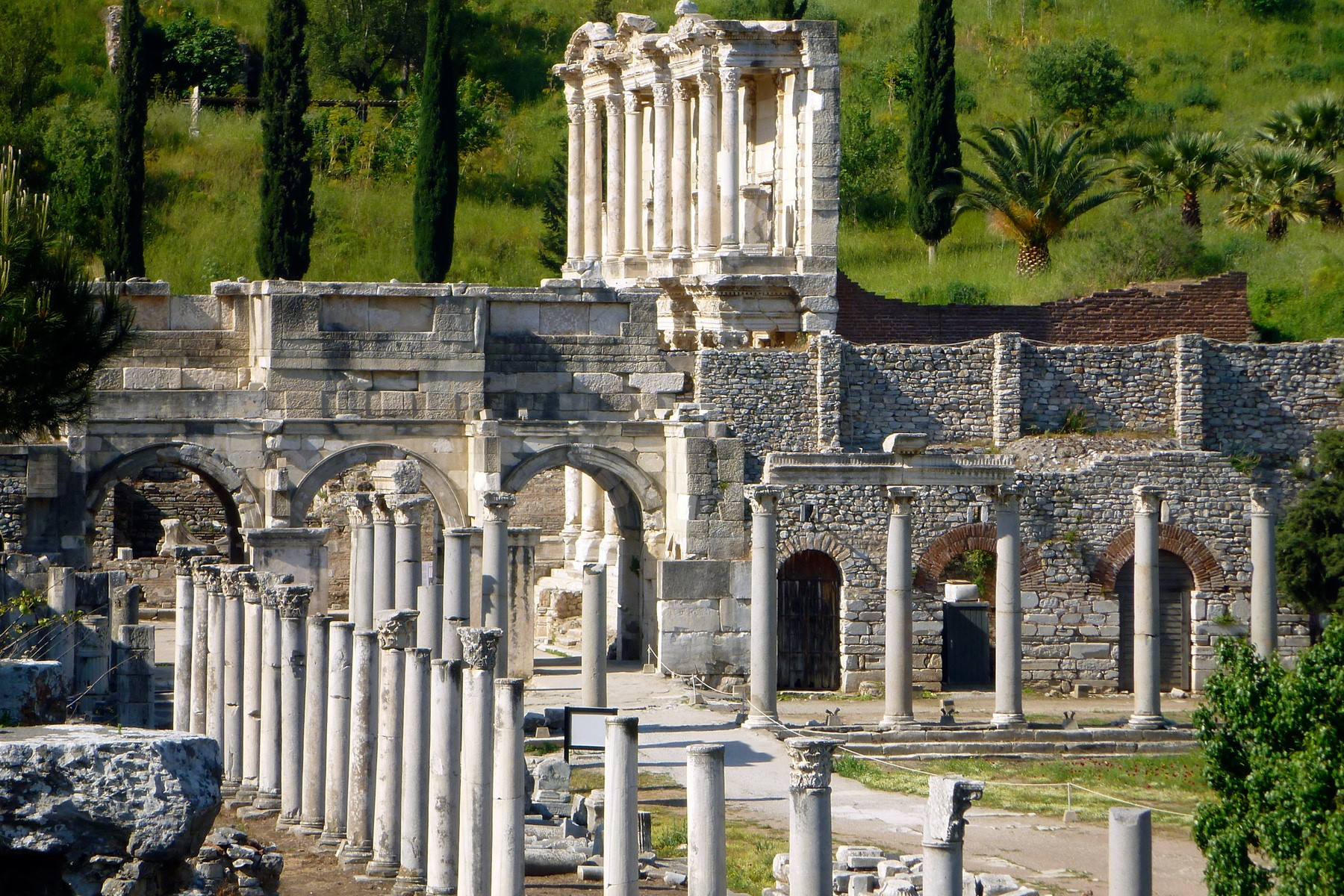
Side view of the Library of Celsus

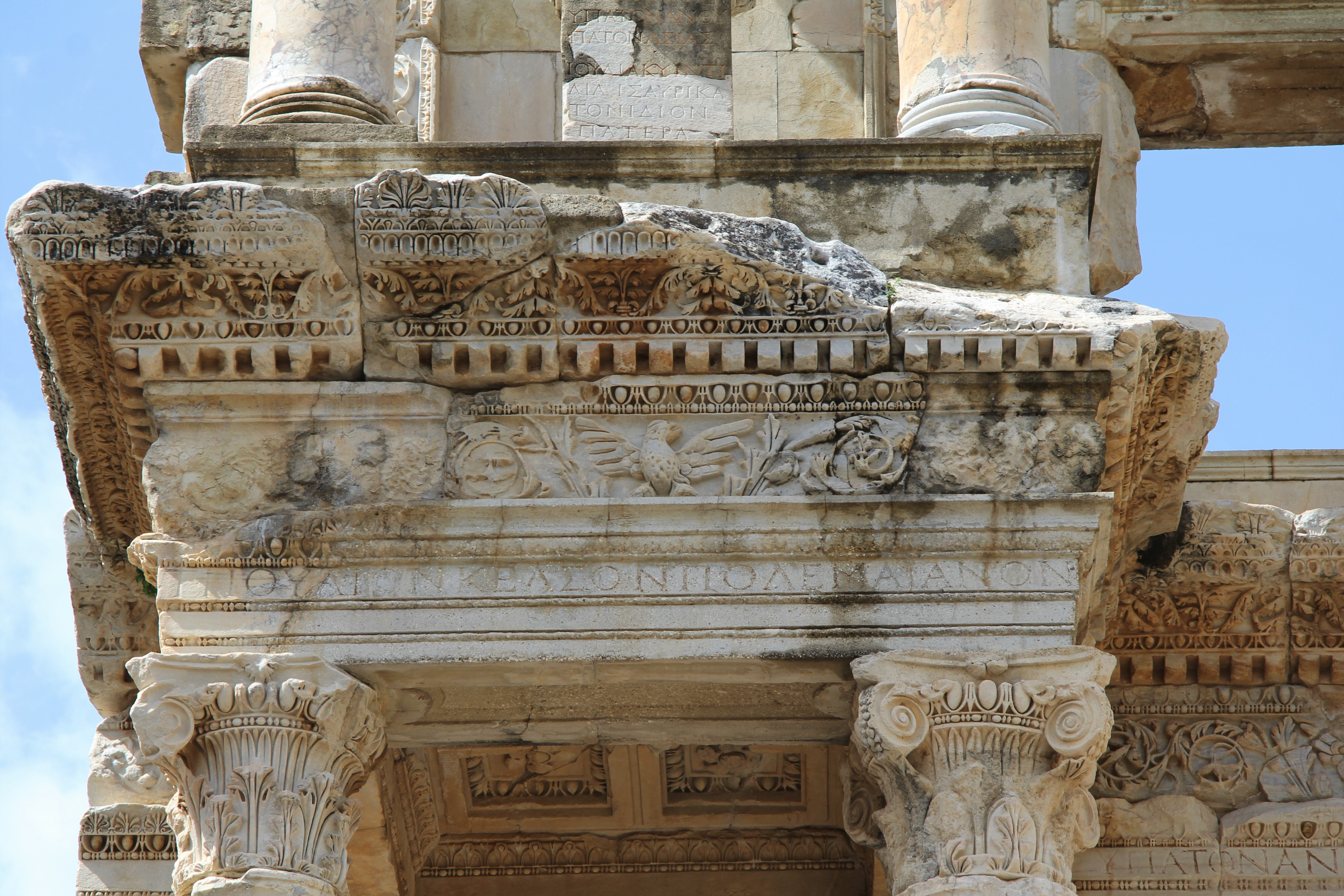
Architectural details of the Library

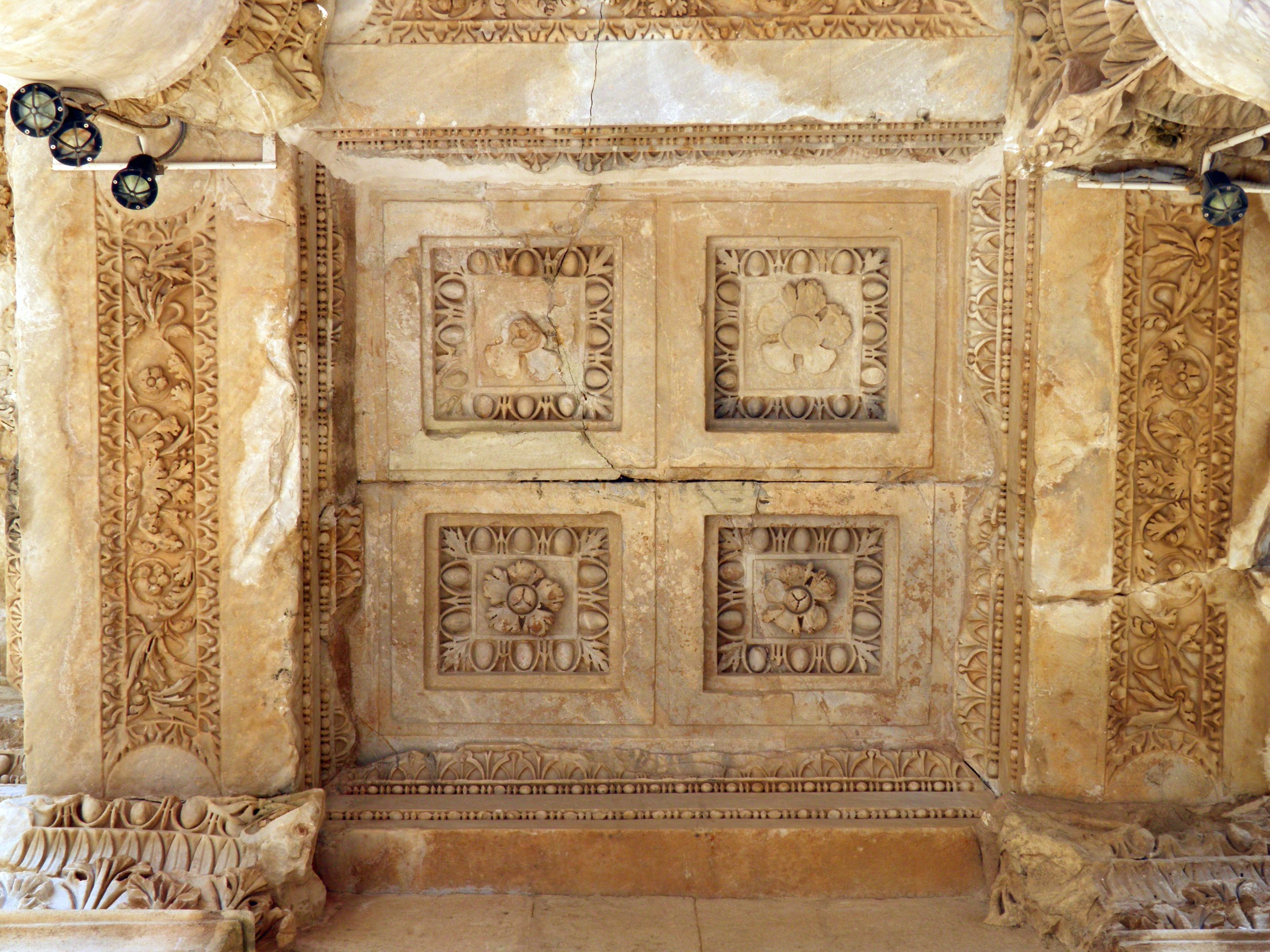
Façade roof of the Library

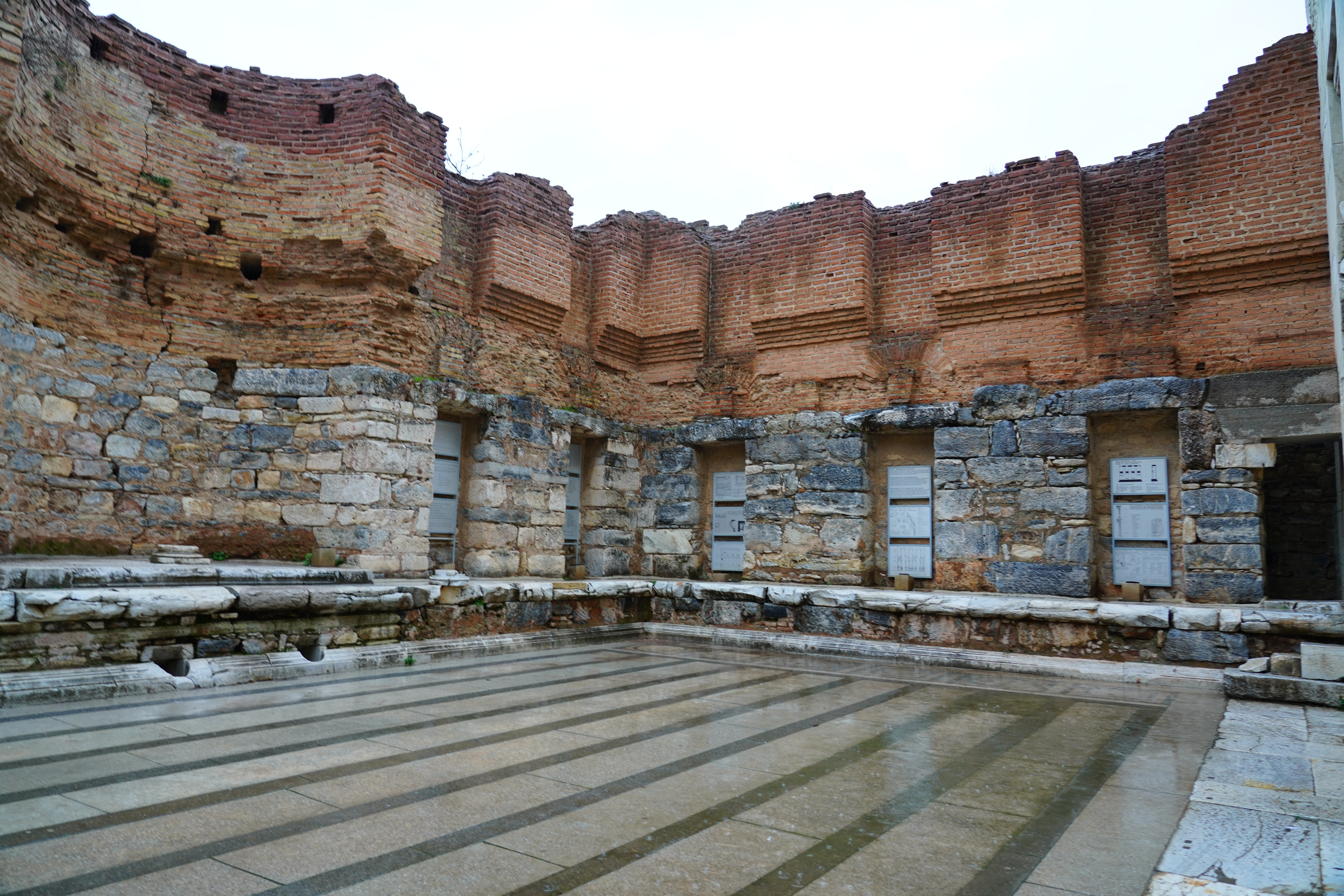
Interior of the Library

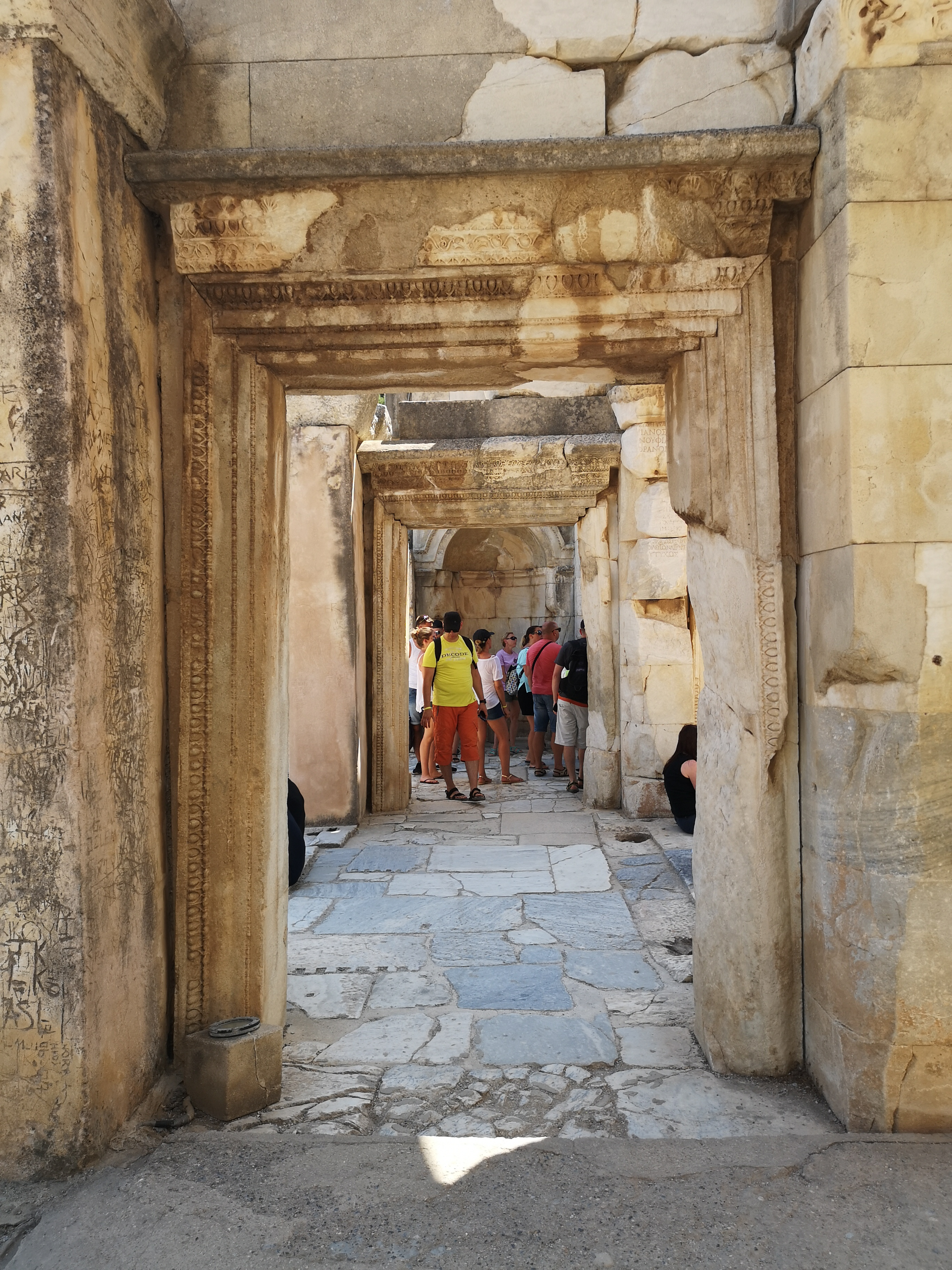
Interior walkway of the Library

== Architecture ==
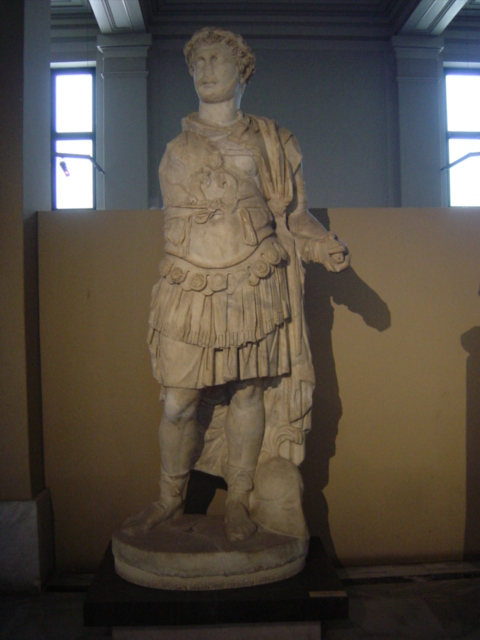
A marble statue of Celsus, which stood in the central niche of the upper storey of the Celsus Library. It is preserved in the Istanbul Archaeological Museum.

The east-facing marble façade of the library is intricately decorated with botanical carvings and portrait statuary. The façade on the outside was built with false perspective, a Greek technique. This means that the inside columns are longer while the outside columns are higher. Though the columns are not identical, the illusion is that they are. This makes the library look larger on the outside and more grand than it actually is. Design features include acanthus leaves, scrolls, and fasces emblems, the latter being a symbol of magisterial power that alludes to Celsus's tenure as a consul. The library is built on a platform, with nine steps the width of the building leading up to three front entrances. These are surmounted by large windows, which may have been fitted with glass or latticework.

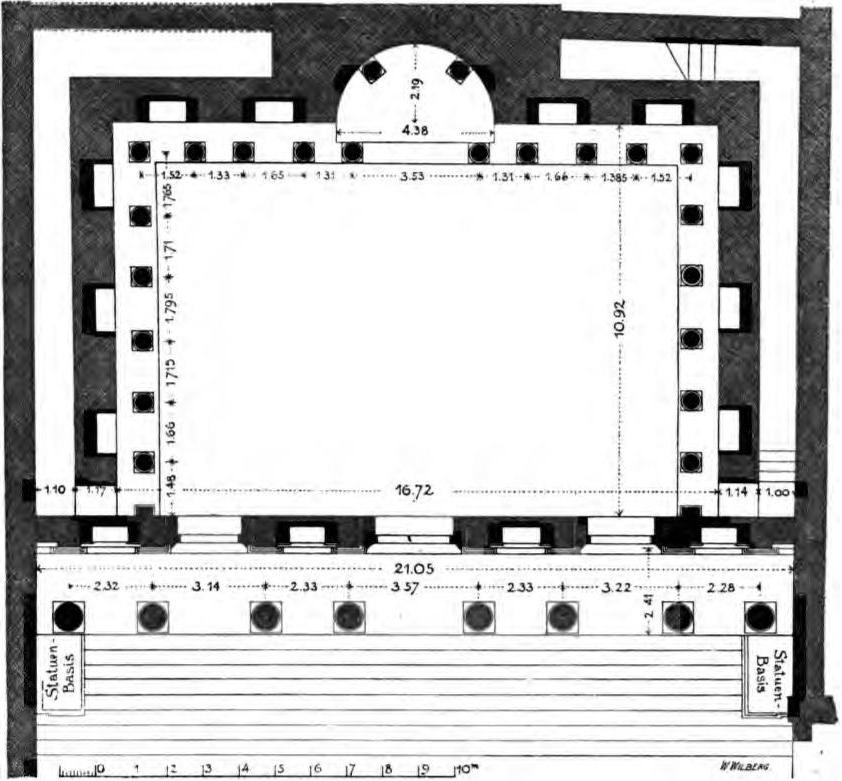
Plan of the Library of Celsus

Flanking the entrances are four pairs of Composite columns elevated on pedestals. A set of Corinthian columns stands directly above. The columns on the lower level frame four aediculae containing statues of female personifications of virtues: Sophia (wisdom), Episteme (knowledge), Ennoia (intelligence), and Arete (excellence). The four statues of the female virtues are not originals, but were replaced with four random female statues. These virtues allude to the dual purpose of the structure, built to function as both a library and a mausoleum; their presence both implies that the man for whom it was built exemplified these four virtues, and that the visitor may cultivate these virtues in him or herself by taking advantage of the library's holdings. This type of façade with inset frames and niches for statues is similar to that of the skene found in ancient Greek theatres and is thus characterized as "scenographic". The columns on the second level flank four podia, paralleling the aediculae below, which held statues of Celsus and his son. A third register of columns may have been present in antiquity, though today only two remain.

On the inside, there are three levels of bookcases meant to be accessed through stairways. The main staircase was flanked by two inscriptions, one in Greek and the other in Latin, which caters to both Romans and Greeks of all literate classes. There is also a Hellenistic scroll on the doorways that has a Roman symbol, which shows the interaction of both cultures. The features that are Roman are the composite capitals as well as the tripartite theatrical frons scenae. Several Roman motifs appeared throughout the library, including reliefs fashioned after Julius Caesar's that had never been seen before in Ephesus or Asia Minor in general. The interior of the building, which has yet to be restored, consisted of a single rectangular room measuring 17×11 m, with a central apse framed by a large arch at the far wall. The apse contained a podium for a statue, now lost, that likely depicted Celsus, although some scholars have suggested it was Minerva, Roman goddess of wisdom.

A crypt containing Celsus's decorated marble sarcophagus was located beneath the floor of the apse. It was unusual in Roman culture for someone to be buried within a library or even within city limits, so this was a special honour for Celsus, reflecting his prominent role as a public official.

The three remaining walls were lined with either two or three levels of niches measuring 2.55×1.1×0.58 m on average, which would have held the armaria to house the scrolls. These niches, which were backed with double walls, may have also had a function to control the humidity and protect the scrolls from the extreme temperature. The upper level was a gallery with a balcony overlooking the main floor, creating a lofty spatial effect inside. It could be reached via a set of stairs built into the walls, which added structural support. The ceiling was flat and may have had a central round oculus to provide more light.

The design of the library, with its ornate, balanced façade, reflects the influence of Greek style on Roman architecture, which reached its height in the second century.

After the Aegean Sea earthquake of October 20, 2020, the performance of the reconstructed library was tested, and it performed well in terms of seismic behavior and the interaction between the adjacent walls and façade.

== Other finds ==
A large seven-branched menorah, approximately 20 centimetres (7.9 in) x 18.5 centimetres (7.3 in), was engraved on the second step from the top of the staircase leading to the library. It postdates the staircase's probable construction around 117, but its precise date is unknown and it may have been added during a later restoration or another period of use.

== Portraiture of Celsus ==
The cuirassed statue of Celsus now in the Istanbul Archaeological Museum was one of three statues of the building's patron located on the second level of the façade. He is depicted with a strong jaw, curly hair, and a neat beard, Hellenizing portrait features that echo the stylistic choices of the building's façade. The style imitates traits of Hadrianic imperial portraiture, suggesting that it was sculpted after the lifetime of not only Celsus, but of his son Aquila as well. The choice to depict him in full armor suggests that Celsus's descendants considered his military career memorable and a source of pride.

== Commemoration ==
The building's façade was depicted on the reverse of the Turkish 20 million lira banknote of 2001–2005 and of the 20 new lira banknote of 2005–2009.

== See also ==
- List of libraries in the ancient world
- List of destroyed libraries
