= Quintus Volusius Saturninus (consul 92) =

Late 1st/early 2nd century AD Roman senator and consul

Quintus Volusius Saturninus was a Roman Senator who lived in the Roman Empire in the second half of the 1st century AD and the first half of the 2nd century. He was ordinary consul for the year 92 as the colleague of the Emperor Domitian, consul for the sixteenth time. He is primarily known through inscriptions.

Saturninus was one of three known children of Quintus Volusius Saturninus, consul in 56, and his wife Torquata; the others included Lucius Volusius Saturninus, consul of 87, and Volusia Torquata. Although the name of his wife has not been identified from any surviving inscription, Saturninus has been identified as the father of Volusia Cornelia.

== Career ==
Until the recovery of a dedication from the ruins of a villa in Lucus Feroniae owned at one point by the Volusii Saturnini, all that was known of Saturninus beyond his consulate was his presence at one of the ceremonies of the Arval Brethren in 119. This inscription bore a cursus honorum for the man. After providing his name with filation, the inscription attests he started his senatorial career likely in his teens as one of the tresviri monetalis, the most prestigious of the four boards of the vigintiviri, a minor collegium which young senators served on at the start of their careers. Serving as one of the tresviri monetales was usually reserved either for members of the patrician class or young men favored by the emperor; his membership in the salius Palatinus confirms he was a patrician. Although this office is not mentioned in the inscription, as a patrician Saturninus would have been guaranteed that as quaestor he would have been assigned to assist the emperor, and as quaestor Saturninus' duties would have included reading the emperor's speeches to the Senate. Another detail that can be inferred from his status as a Patrician is that if he acceded to consul anno suo, or at the legal age of 32, as many Patricians did, Saturninus most likely was born around the year 60.

At this point, the Lucus Feroniae inscription presents problems, due both to damage and to unusual terminology. One line reads prefecto [...]. In his discussion of this inscription Werner Eck first proposed the lost word was fabricum, an uncommon term for an assistant to a proconsular official; he could only cite two other examples of its usage. However, in a note added to the end of his article just before publication, Eck accepted another restoration of the line, proposed by Joyce Reynolds: prefecto [fer(iarum) Lat(inarum], or overseer of an old Latin festival observed into the second century AD, which is much better known. The second problem involves the next two lines, [ce]nturioni eq[uitum] [tu]rmae p[rimae]. At first glance this appears to be a less common form of the title sevir equitum Romanorum, an official who presided at the annual review of the equites; although a relatively unimportant function, Birley notes "it was thought worth mentioning by over a hundred senators."

However, Eck points out that centurion is not the usual title for a commander of cavalry, and by comparing this inscription with a near-contemporary one concerning Lucius Nonius Asprenas (consul in 71 or 72), shows this is not a stone-cutter's mistake: centurioni equitum turmae primae was an actual title. Having acknowledged the odd language, Eck then argues that the titles were, indeed, identical.

== Miscellaneous ==
Saturninus contributed to the drafting of the Roman army for war with Dacia under Trajan. One of the consuls of 174, Quintus Volusius Flaccus Cornelianus, may have been his grandson.

Political offices
Preceded by Quintus Valerius Vegetus, and Publius Metilius Nepos as suffect consuls	Consul of the Roman Empire; 92 with Domitius XVI, followed by Lucius Venuleius Montanus Apronianus	Succeeded by Lucius Stertinius Avitus, and Tiberius Julius Celsus Polemaeanus as suffect consuls
