= Quintus Volusius Flaccus Cornelianus =

2nd century Roman senator and consul

Quintus Volusius Flaccus Cornelianus was a Roman Senator who lived during the 2nd century. He was ordinary consul in 174 as the colleague of Lucius Aurelius Gallus.

Little is known on his origins and life. Cornelianus was a member of the gens Volusia. He may have been a descendant of Quintus Volusius Saturninus, consul of 92.

The name of Cornelianus is mentioned in a Roman papyrus written between 193 and 197. The papyrus, written in Latin and Greek, contains a list of soldiers in some type of military unit, perhaps cavalrymen. It was probably later reused as an envelope for a letter or a small object.

== Sources ==
- Brian Jones, The Emperor Domitian, Routledge, 2002
- Advanced Papyrological Information System, UM, P.Mich.inv. 3240; Recto

Political offices
Preceded by Gnaeus Claudius Severus II, and Claudius Pompeianus II as ordinary consuls	Consul of the Roman Empire; 174 with Lucius Aurelius Gallus	Succeeded by Marcus Aemilius Macer Saturninus, and ignotus as suffect consuls
