= 262 Southwest Anatolia earthquake =

Earthquake which devastated cities on coasts of Anatolia (262)

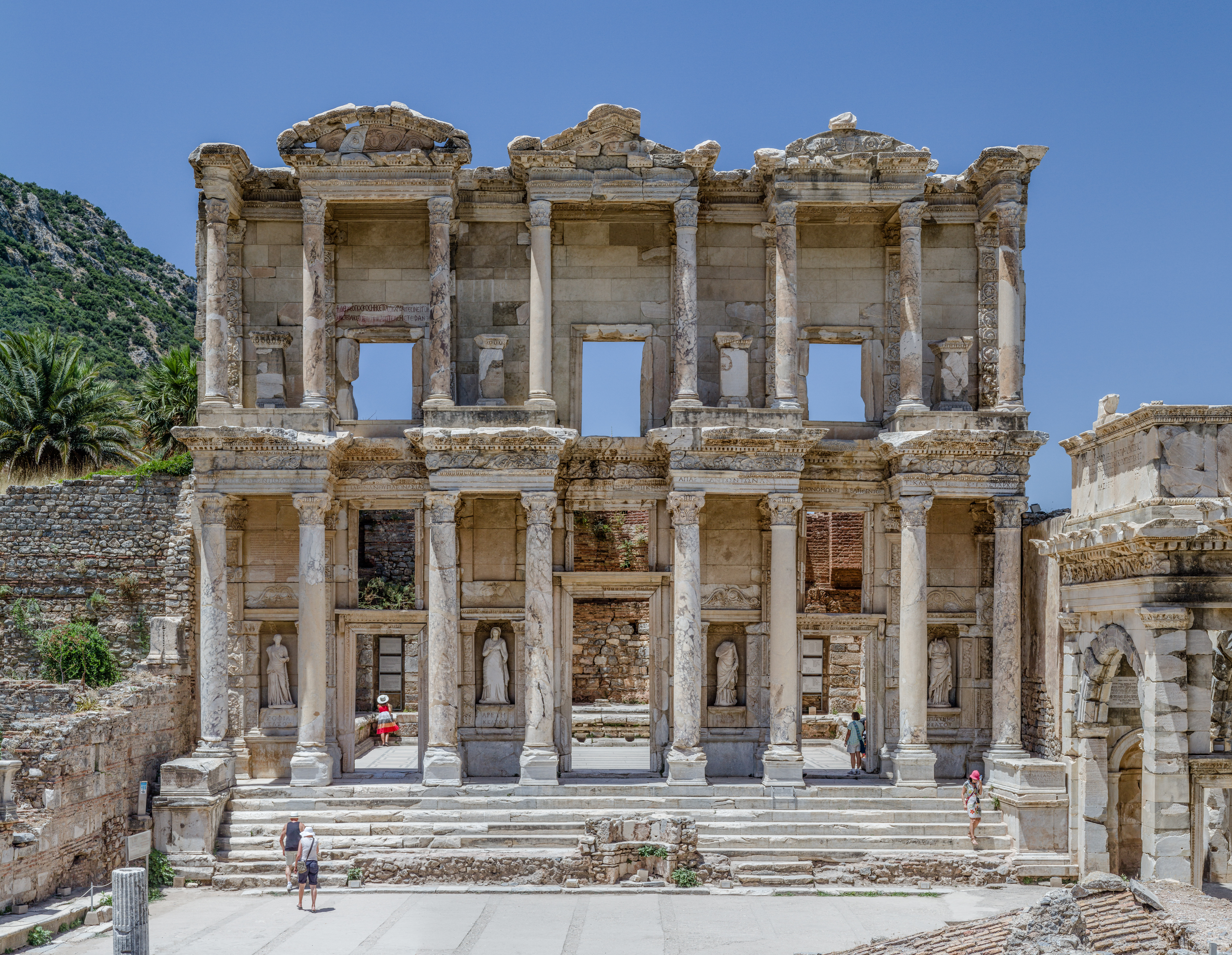
- The contents of the Library of Celsus at Ephesus were destroyed by a fire in 262 AD caused either by an earthquake or by an invasion. The façade was toppled in another earthquake centuries later and re-erected in 1970–1978.

- Location within Turkey
- Local date: 21 December 262
- Epicenter: 36.5°N 27.8°E
- Areas affected: Turkey
- Max. intensity: MMI IX (Violent)
- Tsunami: Estimated at Intensity 4 on the Sieberg-Ambraseys scale

The 262 Southwest Anatolia earthquake devastated the Roman city of Ephesus along with cities along the west and south coasts of Anatolia in year 262, or possibly 261, on 21 December. The epicenter was likely located in the southern Aegean Sea. Reports note that many cities were flooded by the sea, presumably due to a tsunami.

Nicholas Ambraseys, who performed the most comprehensive assessment of ancient earthquakes in the Mediterranean, traces the original source of most literary references to this quake to an account in the Augustan History purportedly written by Trebellius Pollio. This source is problematic, as the veracity of much of its supposed biographical details is doubtful. However, there is some reason to give credence to the history's accounts of natural disasters. Trebellius's account also reports the southwest Anatolia earthquake in conjunction with one that hit Cyrene, Libya the same year. The two events appears to have been unrelated, but it has been difficult for historians to disentangle the exact effects of each based on the classical sources.

== Tectonic setting ==
There are many faults in the Aegean Sea and the adjacent coastal areas of Anatolia, caused by the African plate being subducted beneath the Aegean Sea plate. These faults result in frequent earthquakes. Ephesus, which sustained considerable damage in the 262 AD earthquake, was also struck by earthquakes in 17 AD, sometime before 30 AD, c. 42 AD, c. 46–47 AD, c. 150–155, 358–366, 614, and the tenth or eleventh century. One fault in the southern part of the region stretches from the island of Rhodes in present-day Greece northeastwards to Burdur in present-day Turkey.

== Damage ==
Trebellius wrote that the cities of Roman Asia reported the worst damage from the earthquake: "In many places the earth yawned open, and salt water appeared in the fissures. Many cities were even overwhelmed by the sea." He records that this damage occurred took place during the consulship of Gallienus and Fausianus. The latter appears to be Nummius Faustianus who was a consul in the year 262.

Much of the Library of Celsus at Ephesus (including all the books) was destroyed by fire in or around 262. The cause of the fire has been attributed either to this earthquake or to an invasion by the Goths (sometimes incorrectly identified as Scythians). Ephesus's Temple of Artemis, one of the Seven Wonders of the Ancient World, was also destroyed around the same date, although some sources attribute this to a Gothic invasion in 267 or 268. There is some archeological evidence at Ephesus supporting the date implied by Trebellius's account. Stefan Karwiese of the Austrian Archaeological Institute at Athens reports that ceramics found near the library and temple can be dated to the second half of the third century.

A study of geological processes in Roman cities concludes that 11 major buildings at Ephesus required rebuilding after the 262 earthquake: the terrace houses, Temple of Serapis (Serapeion), Stoa of Damianus, Harbor Baths (also known as the Great Baths or Baths of Constantius), Baths of Varius and Scholastica Baths, Magnesian Gate, Medusa Gate, Lower Agora (also known as the Tetragonos Agora), Library of Celsus, theatre and stadium.

== Account by "Trebellius Pollio" ==
The Augustan History contains a biography of Gallienus titled "The Two Gallieni" and ascribed to Trebellius Pollio, likely a pseudonym. The writer appears to have been aiming to retrospectively malign the character of Gallienus. Among the descriptions of his frivolity and military defeats is a section that relates several natural disasters of the time. Romans frequently saw these as omens and it was not unusual to conflate several events from the same year.

In the consulship of Gallienus and Fausianus, amid so many calamities of war, there was also a terrible earthquake and a darkness for many days. There was heard, besides, the sound of thunder, not like Jupiter thundering, but as though the earth were roaring. And by the earthquake many structures were swallowed up together with their inhabitants, and many men died of fright. This disaster, indeed, was worst in the cities of Asia; but Rome, too, was shaken and Libya also was shaken. In many places the earth yawned open, and salt water appeared in the fissures. Many cities were even overwhelmed by the sea. Therefore the favour of the gods was sought by consulting the Sibylline Books, and, according to their command, sacrifices were made to Jupiter Salutaris. For so great a pestilence, too, had arisen in both Rome and the cities of Achaea that in one single day five thousand men died of the same disease.

While Fortune thus raged, and while here earthquakes, there clefts in the ground, and in divers places pestilence, devastated the Roman world, while Valerian was held in captivity and the provinces of Gaul were, for the most part, beset, while Odaenathus was threatening war, Aureolus pressing hard on Illyricum, and Aemilianus in possession of Egypt, a portion of the Goths...

— Trebellius Pollio (pseudonym), "The Two Gallieni", Augustan History

== See also ==
- List of earthquakes in Turkey
- List of historical earthquakes
- List of tsunamis

== Sources ==
- Anonymous (c. 395). Historia Augusta [Augustan History] (in Latin).
- Altınok, Y.; Alpar, B.; Özer, N.; Aykurt, H. (2011). "Revision of the tsunami catalogue affecting Turkish coasts and surrounding regions" (PDF). Natural Hazards and Earth System Sciences. 11 (2): 273. Bibcode:2011NHESS..11..273A. doi:10.5194/nhess-11-273-2011.
- Ambraseys, Nicholas (2009). Earthquakes in the Mediterranean and Middle East: A Multidisciplinary Study of Seismicity up to 1900 (1 ed.). Cambridge University Press. ISBN 978-0521872928.
- Crouch, Dora P. (2003). Geology and Settlement: Greco-Roman Patternsvc. Oxford University Press. ISBN 978-0-19-508324-8.
- "South Coasts of Asia Minor: Comments for the Tsunami Event". Significant Tsunami Database. National Geophysical Data Center. Archived from the original on October 10, 2017.
- "Turkey: S Coasts; Libya: Comments for the Earthquake Event". Significant Earthquake Database. National Geophysical Data Center. Archived from the original on October 10, 2017.
