= Massaciuccoli =

Village in Tuscany, Italy

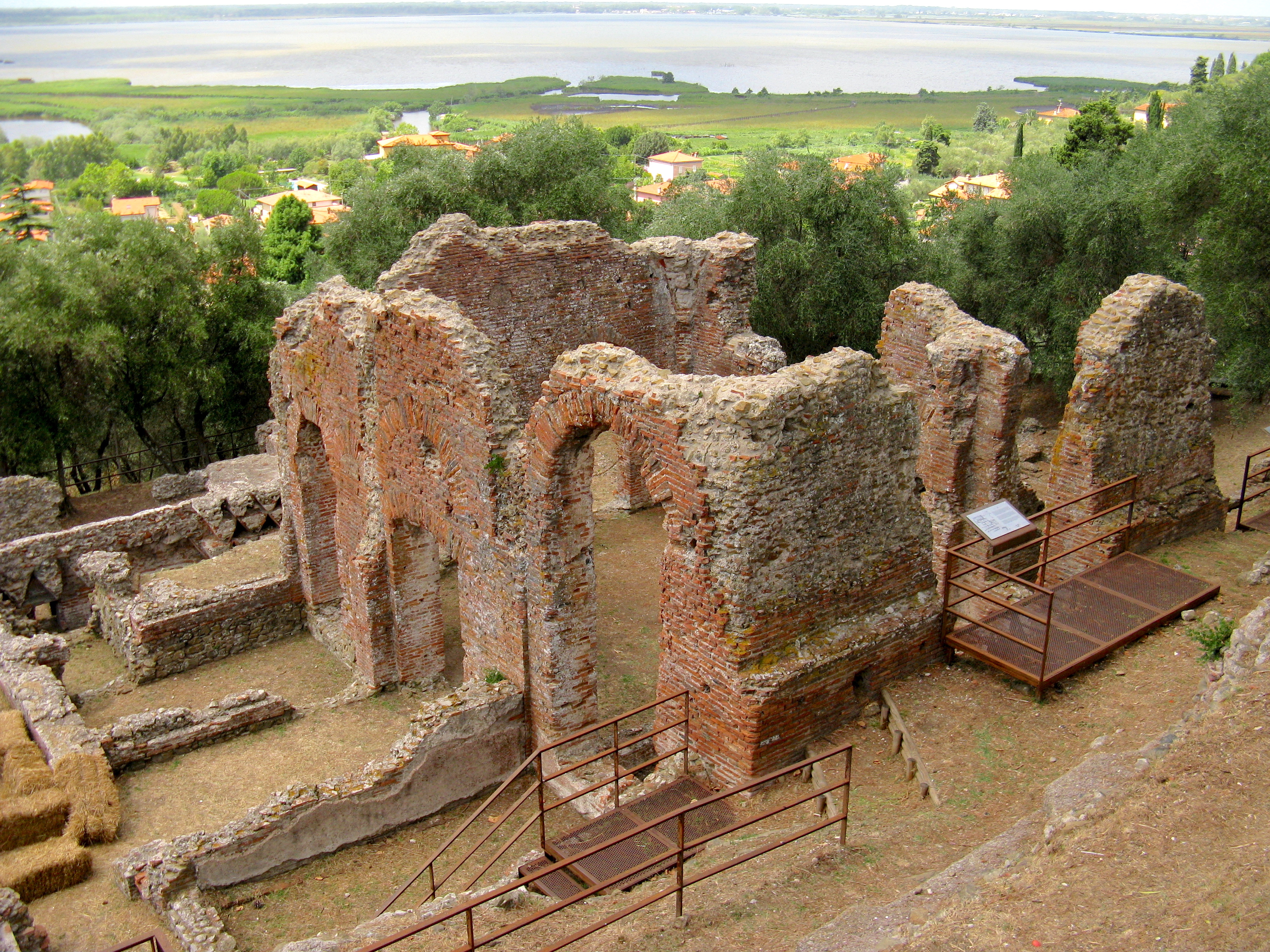
Baths of the villa dei Venulei

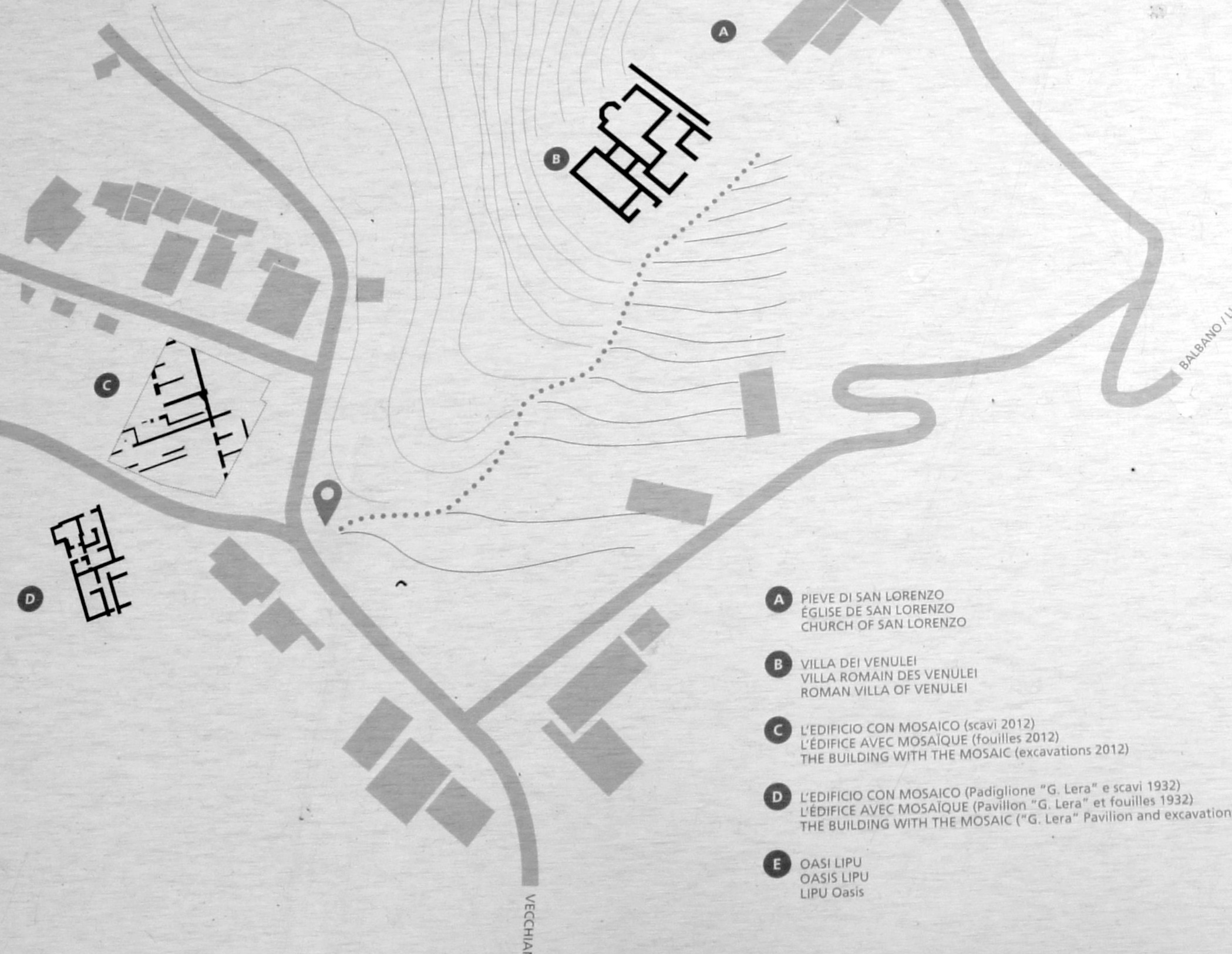
Plan of Roman buildings

Massaciuccoli (Italian pronunciation: [massaˈtʃukkoli]) is village near Lake Massaciuccoli, province of Lucca, Tuscany, Italy, in the municipality of Massarosa.

The main historical interest is the exceptional monumental baths of the ancient Roman villa complex that belonged to the patrician Venulei family.

== The site ==
In antiquity, Massaciuccoli was an important nexus between Pisa, Lucca and Luni: here key roads met key waterways on the lake. Not far away is a small area which was probably a stopping point for travellers on the ancient Roman road that ran along the lake.

Massaciuccoli was long associated with the ancient Roman inn (mansio) named Fosse Papiriane in the ancient Tabula Peutingeriana, a Mediaeval copy of a Roman street map. Nevertheless, some believe that the lodging place was located instead along the road that ran through the coastal dunes (the via Aurelia or via Aemilia Scauri?). The Roman name for Massaciuccoli is still unknown.

== History ==
Remains of the most ancient period attested in the excavation area are irregular buildings with a few ceramic fragments which date between the 7th and 4th centuries BC.

=== Roman Era ===
The first traces of the Roman occupation are a masonry building dating to around the 1st century BC, located in the north-eastern sector of the excavation area, with a single room, perhaps an isolated cottage or part of a larger building that extended to the north, beyond the limit of the excavation area.

In the beginning of the 1st century AD, the area was reorganised as a villa estate with a farm. Between the 1st and 2nd century AD, the villa underwent restoration and expansion that accentuated the scenographic character of the monumental complex. To the monumental luxurious (otium) upper villa were added agricultural production functions lower down the hill (divided into two sections by the modern road).

The villa was built by the Etruscan family of the Venuleii (as attested by lead pipe and brick stamps), one of the most important families of Pisa in the 1st and 2nd centuries AD. Lucius Venuleius Montanus was proconsul of Bithynia et Pontus in 54-68 AD; his son Lucius Venuleius Montanus Apronianus was a Roman senator in 92 AD; Lucius Venuleius was consul in 123; and Lucius Venuleius Apronianus Octavius Priscus was consul in 145 and 168. The luxurious and ornamental development of the villa reflected the economic and political fortunes of its wealthy owners who came here to spend their periods of otium from Pisa or Rome, where they carried out their activities.

=== The decline ===
The role played by the villa must have ended with the decline of its owners at the end of the 2nd century, coinciding with the last news on the Venulei. The buildings show disruption and major collapses during the 3rd century from renovations and various interventions that had not restored the previous functionality to the complex. New collapses led to the progressive abandonment of the area and its burial under a series of layers of earth (late 3rd century). After the fourth century is the last agricultural work attested: numerous holes for wooden shed poles and by traces of planting and removal of tree species.

== The Venulei villa ==
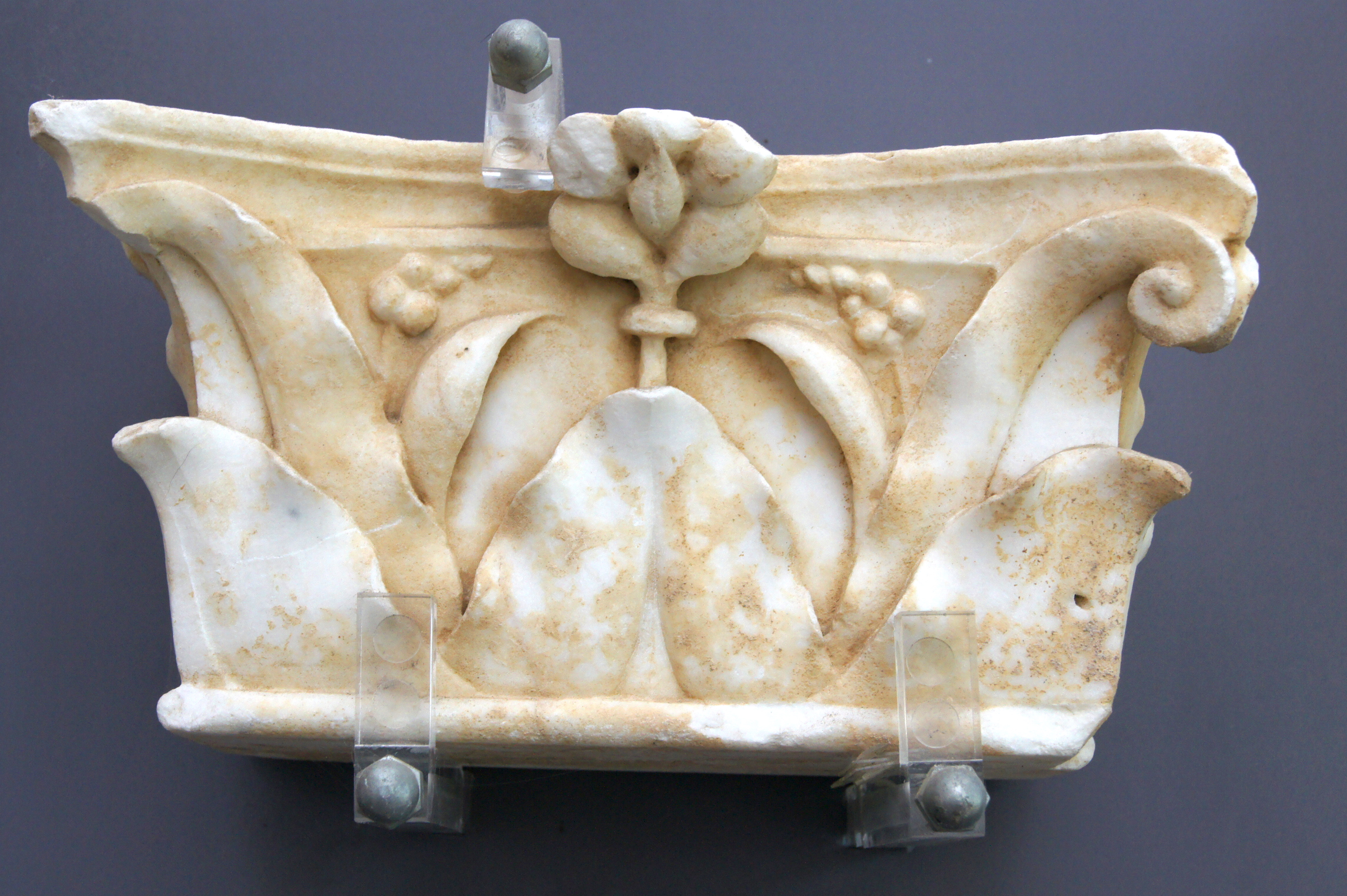
villa dei Venulei detail

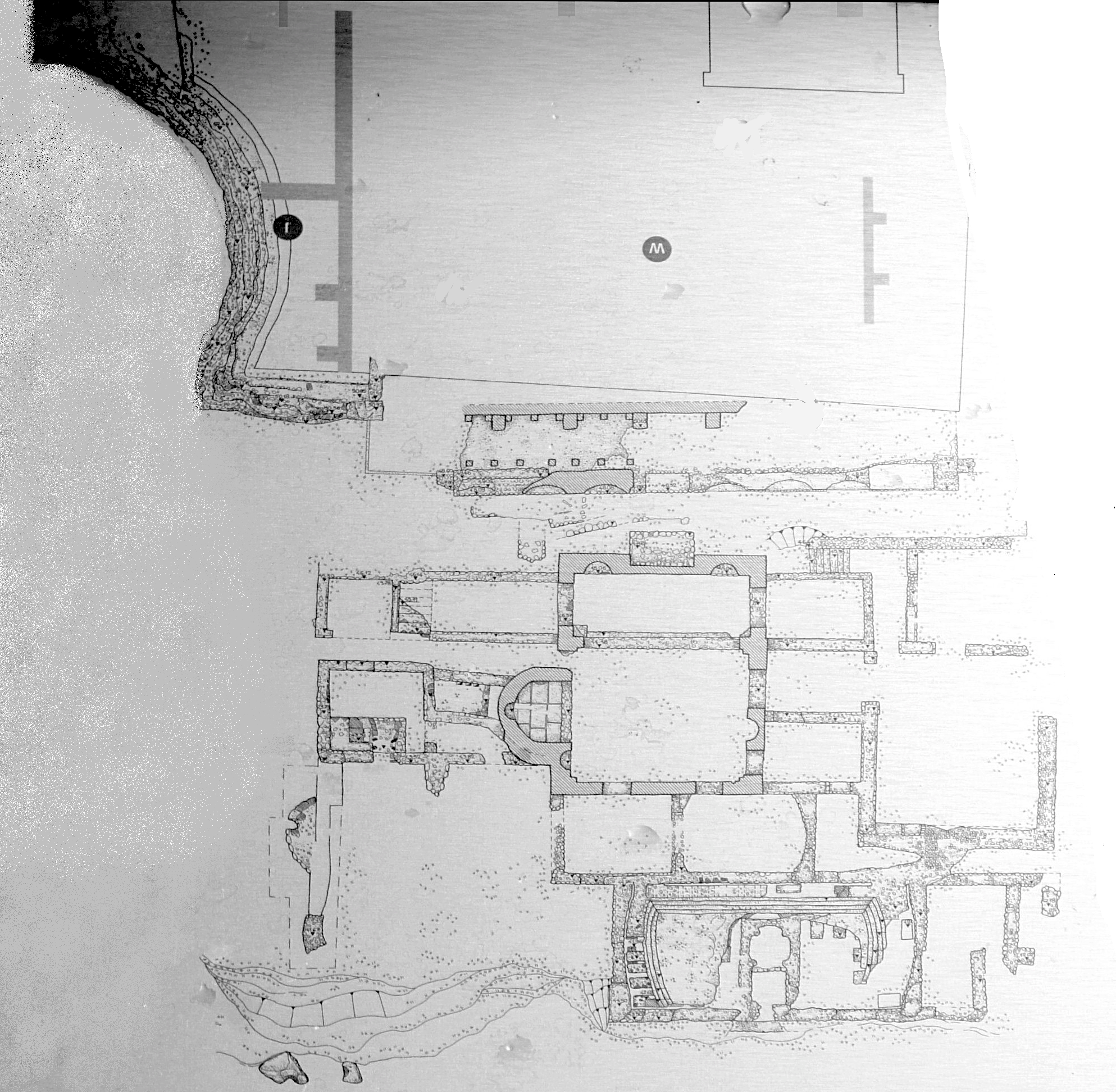
Plan of baths

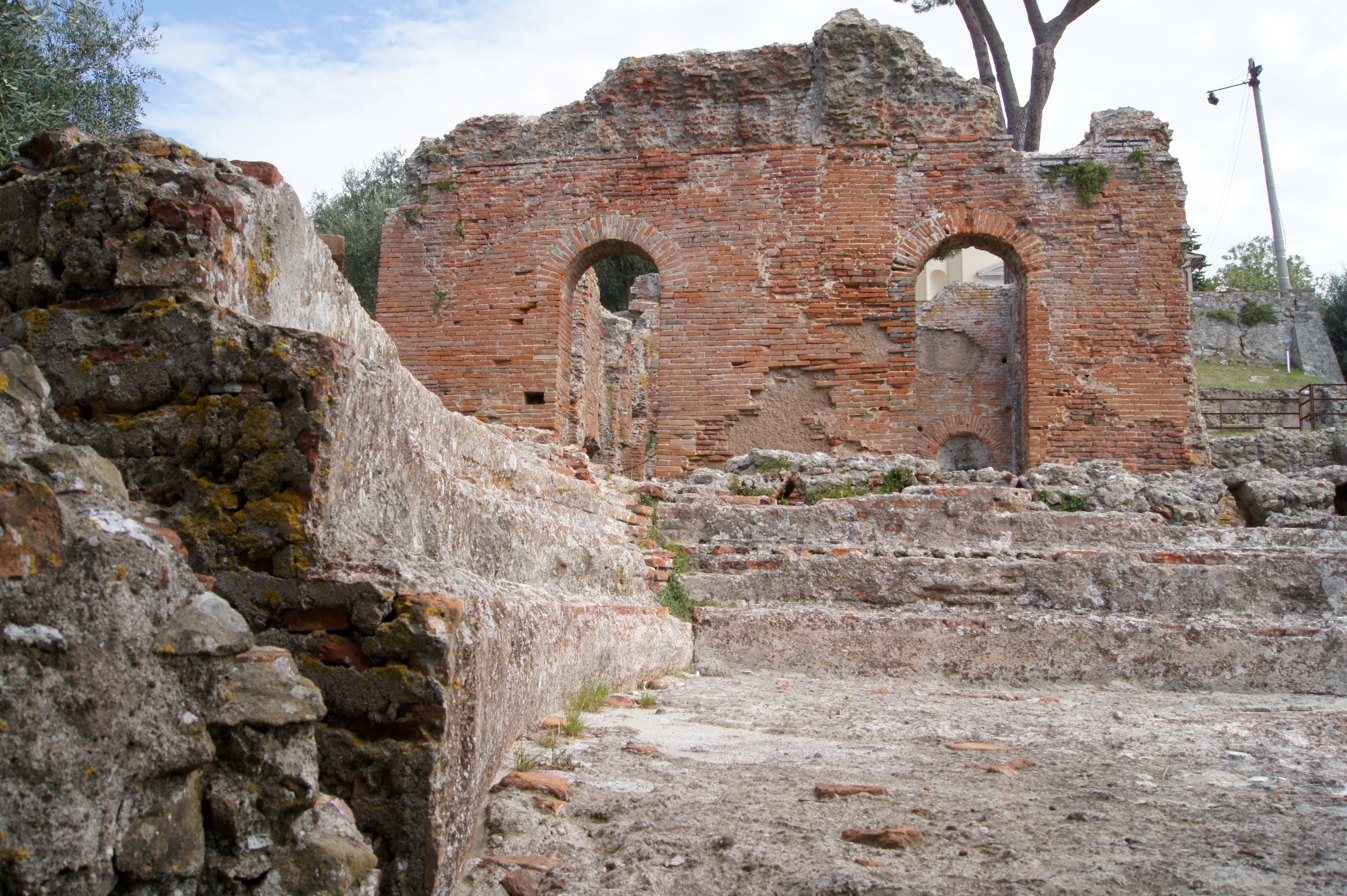
large sauna or hot bath

To travellers on the coast below, the massive villa on the slopes of Mt. Aquilata must have been imposing, dominating the surrounding area. The villa, in a spectuclar setting and scenically integrated in the landscape, reflected the owner's eminent status and displayed his wealth and power. A massive elliptical wall on the north side confirmed the prominence of the building and supported the upper terrace on which the church of S. Lorenzo now stands. In the 1st and 2nd centuries, this area was occupied by the residential and service areas of the villa of which little remains today. In the square in front of the church there must have been the castellum acquae, the main reservoir for the water that fed the nymphaeum placed halfway between the two terraces and the thermal baths on the lower terrace.

=== The thermal baths ===
The thermal spa was on the lower terrace and has an irregular layout indicating it has undergone modifications and extensions compared to the original building. The main entrance, most likely located on the south side, overlooked a large rectangular room which led to the main rooms: frigidarium, tepidarium, calidarium and the large central hall. The central hall had walls of large bricks that rose up to the vaulted ceiling and a floor with rhomboids and triangles of yellow marble (Giallo antico); apsidal niches covered with marble slabs contained statues.

On the south-west side overlooking the lake is an exceptionally large calida lavatio (hot bath), or sauna, with furnace underneath. Similar large heated baths have been found in wealthy villas such as at Bocca di Magra in Lunigiana, Domitian's at Sabaudia and Hadrian's villa in Tivoli. Two vaulted corridors allowed servants to fuel the furnace without being seen by bathers. The sophisticated and expensive heating system is called a samovar which uses a large metal dome in the pool floor above the furnace to heat the pool water directly.

On the east side of the baths were several residential rooms for reception and accommodation of guests, with rich marble wall tiles and mosaic floors which have been lost over time. A monumental staircase linked these rooms to the villa on the upper terrace.

Secondary rooms were: the massage room, the vestibule, the latrine and the praefurnium (furnace for hot air).

=== The service area ===
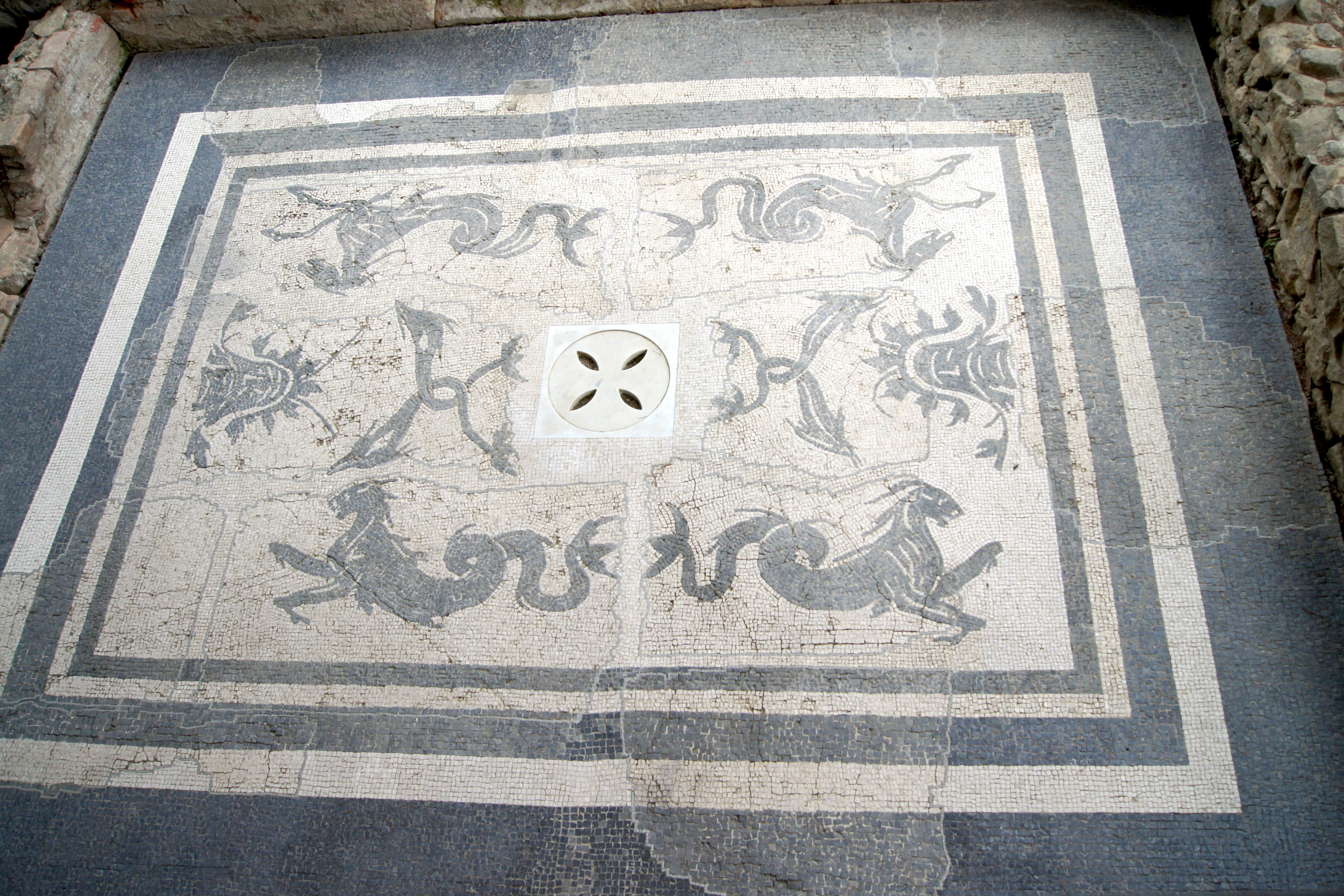
Mosaic of frigidarium of lower building

A new building, probably a dependence of the villa d'otium, was built further down the hill. A series of rooms are distributed around a large arcaded (peristyle) courtyard with a central garden and equipped with two channels along the perimeter (one to collect and dispose of rainwater, the other to drain water from the rooms). The courtyard was a transit and communication area between the rooms, as well as a work area.

In the central-northern part there are a series of functional rooms: a granary, warehouses, tool sheds and small rooms, perhaps a shelter for workers. To the north, a large room is divided into different areas by means of different floors and partitions. The features suggest the presence of an oil or wine press. On the south-eastern side of the central courtyard there is a large kitchen and a paved room, perhaps used as a bedroom (cubiculum). A perimeter wall highlights the clear separation of the production area from the large central courtyard.

Between the Claudian age and the end of the 1st century AD, the second renovation changed the distribution and function of the interior spaces. The most affected portion was the northern one where the large room in which it is assumed the presence of a press was dismantled and divided into smaller rooms; the north portico was transformed into an open courtyard where the use of fire took place; the small rooms overlooking the courtyard were merged to obtain larger service rooms. On the eastern edge of the area a large water cistern is assumed.

It is likely that the residential part of this building was along the east, south and west sides of the courtyard. A small thermal circuit (balneum) in the portion of the building west of via Pietra Padule also belongs to this phase.

In the 2nd century AD, a probable traumatic event caused the collapse of part of the walls that were being restored. This involved a new division of spaces with the creation of larger rooms and the creation of an area intended for worship (sacellum) that opened onto the central courtyard. The new arrangement seemed to transform the building's use, which could then be an inn (mansio). The rooms to the north for production (linked to breeding and agriculture and connected with the use of fire and water) remained, as shown by hobs and systems for the supply and discharge of water.

== The museum ==
The remains of the lower building along via Pietra a Padule are today protected by a glass and steel tensile structure to create the Guglielmo Lera exhibition pavilion that allows optimal use and visibility. Didactic panels accompany the visitor along a path that tells the essential moments of the building's history.

== Bibliography ==
- ANICHINI F., layers of history: new discoveries for the enhancement of the archaeological massaciuccoli in: ANICHINI F., BERTELLI E., GHIZZANI MARCÍA F., GIANNOTTI S., PARIBENI E., PARODI L., Ask the archaeologist. The book. Guided tour at the end of the excavation, Rome 2012. chapter II
- BERTELLI E., the transformation of the building and the first collapses, in: ANICHINI F., BERTELLI E., GHIZZANI MARCÍA F., GIANNOTTI S., PARIBENI E., PARODI L., Ask the archaeologist. The book. Guided tour at the end of the excavation, Rome 2012. cap. YOU
- BINI M., RIBOLINI A. 2012, Ground Penetrating Survey Radar in the archaeological area of Roman Massaciuccoli, in ANICHINI F., Roman Massaciuccoli: the 2011-2012 excavation campaign. Research data, Rome, pp. 392.
- A.MINTO, The Roman Baths of Massaciuccoli, Extr. From published Ancient Monuments, R. Accademia dei Lincei, vol. 27, 1921.
- MENCHINI M., the last phase of life, the collapse of the building and the agricultural use of the area in: ANICHINI F., BERTELLI E., GHIZZANI MARCÍA F., GIANNOTTI S., PARIBENI E., PARODI L., Ask the archaeologist. The book. Guided tour at the end of the excavation, Rome 2012. cap. VII
- PARIBENI E., The site of massaciuccoli in: ANICHINI F., BERTELLI E., GHIZZANI MARCÍA F., GIANNOTTI S., PARIBENI E., PARODI L., Ask the archaeologist. The book. Guided tour at the end of the excavation, Rome 2012. cap. THE
- PARODI L., the construction of the Roman building: ANICHINI F., BERTELLI E., GHIZZANI MARCÍA F., GIANNOTTI S., PARIBENI E., PARODI L., Ask the archaeologist. The book. Guided tour at the end of the excavation, Rome 2012. cap IV
- PECCI A., CAU ONTIVEROS MA 2012, Preliminary results of the floor analyzes, in ANICHINI F., Roman Massaciuccoli: the 2011-2012 excavation campaign. Research data, Rome, pp. 387.
- Francesca Anichini, The excavation of Massaciuccoli, an idea of sharing, in ANICHINI F., Roman Massaciuccoi. The 2011-2012 excavation campaign. Research data, Rome 2012. pp. 13; 16–17; 20–24;
