= Lucius Sergius Paullus (consul 168) =

2nd century Roman senator, consul and governor

- Born: c. 120 AD
- Died: after 168 AD
- Occupations: Roman senator, Consul
- Office: Consul of the Roman Empire (168 AD); Praefectus urbi (c. 167–168 AD)
- Term: 168 AD (with Lucius Venuleius Apronianus Octavius Priscus)
- Predecessor: Lucius Verus III and Marcus Aurelius III
- Successor: Sextus Quintilius Condianus (consul 180)
- Children: Sergia Paulla
- Relatives: Lucius Sergius Paullus (proconsul) (grandfather)
- Family: Sergia gens

Lucius Sergius Paullus was a Roman senator, who was active during the reign of Marcus Aurelius. He was twice consul: the first time attested 23 September of an unknown year as suffect consul with [? Lucius Nonius Calpurnius] Torquatus Asprenas as his colleague; and as consul ordinarius for 168 as the colleague of Lucius Venuleius Apronianus Octavius Priscus.

Paullus was from the Roman colony of Antioch in Pisidia. It is possible he was the great-grandson of the identically named proconsul of Cyprus in the AD 40s.

== Career ==
Direct information about the first part of his life up to and including his first consulate is missing. Previously it was thought to have been around AD 151. Werner Eck suggests that Sergius Paullus was suffect consul "in the last years of Hadrian's reign"; currently there are gaps in the consular record for the years 136 through 139.

Two recently published military diplomas attest that he was governor of Pannonia Superior in the years 139 and 140; Eck dates his tenure in that province from 139 to 142. A third military diploma attests that he was governor of Syria on 19 March 144. On the basis of this third military diploma, Eck identifies Sergius Paullus with the "philosophically educated Senator" who, as governor of Syria, heard a case the author Lucian brought a charlatan named Peregrinus Proteus. Lucian does not name the governor. He hoped Peregrinus would be convicted; however the governor declined to pass judgment on him, understanding that "he would well accept death in order to leave glory; and so he released him, not deeming him worthy of any punishment."

During the early 160s, Sergius Paullus is recorded as an attendee of the anatomical lectures Galen gave over a three-year period in Rome. G.W. Bowersock notes that these lectures were "very much to the taste of the people of that time", and includes in Galen's audience such prominent Senators as Marcus Vettulenus Civica Barbarus consul in 157, Titus Flavius Boethus suffect consul in 161, and Gnaeus Claudius Severus consul II in 173.

His proconsular governorship of Asia, once dated by Géza Alföldy to 166/167, is no longer admitted. Although the evidence is thin, what has come down to us indicates he was also an influential Senator, for emperor Marcus Aurelius appointed him Urban prefect of Rome around the time of his second consulate, and he held the office of urban prefect to his death.

When Paullus died is an open question. The next attested urban prefect is Gaius Aufidius Victorinus, who entered that office in 179. Alföldy lists the names of five men one or none of whom might have been urban prefect between Paullus and Victorinus, so the probability Paullus' death was only a few years after he entered that office (viz., before 174) is much higher than after.

Political offices
Preceded by Quintus Caecilius Dentilianus, and Marcus Antonius Pallas as suffect consuls	Consul of the Roman Empire; 168 with Lucius Venuleius Apronianus Octavius Priscus II	Succeeded by Quintus Tullius Maximus, and ignotus as suffect consuls
