= Lucius Venuleius Apronianus Octavius Priscus =

2nd century Roman senator, consul and governor

Lucius Venuleius Apronianus Octavius Priscus was a Roman senator active during the first half of the second century AD. He was suffect consul around the year 145, then ordinary consul in 168 with Lucius Sergius Paullus as his colleague. Priscus is known only from non-literary sources.

Priscus has his origins in Pisa; not only were both the fragmentary inscriptions (one lost) used to define his career found in that city, a lead pipe stamped with his name proves he owned property in the town. His father was Lucius Venuleius Apronianus Octavius Priscus.

The Venuleii family owned the magnificent villa-estate at Massaciuccoli.

== Career ==
Professor Géza Alföldy states without hesitation that Priscus is of the patrician class. From his cursus honorum there are details that support this assertion: Priscus began his career as one of the tresviri monetalis, the most prestigious of the four boards that comprise the vigintiviri; appointment to this board was usually allocated to patricians or favored individuals. His service as prefect of the feriae Latinae preceded his term as quaestor, possibly attached to the Roman emperor, most likely Hadrian. Priscus then achieved the office of praetor around the year 142; there is no mention of any intermediary magistracy like plebeian tribune or aedile, which supports Alföldy's assertion that Priscus was a patrician. However, that he was commissioned legatus legionis or commander of Legio I Italica (dated to c. 143–144), is unusual for a patrician by the mid-second century. His suffect consulate followed his tenure as commander of the legion.

Between his first consulate and his second, Priscus was governor of the imperial province of Hispania Tarraconensis. During this period he was likely admitted to the collegium of augurs; becoming one of the augurs usually came after one held the fasces. His membership in the sodales Hadrianales and sodales Antoniani Veriani, two priesthoods of lesser prestige, probably began years before this.

Political offices
Preceded by Quintus Caecilius Dentilianus; Marcus Antonius Pallas as suffecti	Roman consul AD 168 with Lucius Sergius Paullus II	Succeeded by Quintus Tullius Maximus, and ignotus as suffecti
