= Tiberius Julius Celsus Polemaeanus =

1st–2nd century Roman senator and consul

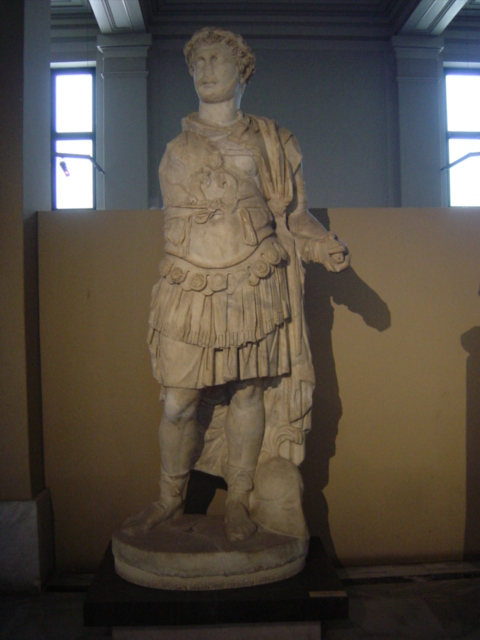
A marble statue of Celsus from the eponymous library built in his honor by the son Tiberius Julius Aquila, currently preserved in the Istanbul Archaeological Museum.

Tiberius Julius Celsus Polemaeanus (Greek: Τιβέριος Ἰούλιος Κέλσος Πολεμαιανός, romanized: Tibérios Ioúlios Kélsos Polemaianós), commonly known as Celsus (c. 45 CE – before c. 120 CE), was an Ancient Greek military commander and politician of the Roman Empire who became a senator, and served as suffect consul as the colleague of Lucius Stertinius Avitus. Celsus Polemaeanus was a wealthy and popular citizen and benefactor of Ephesus, and was buried in a sarcophagus beneath the famous Library of Celsus, which was built as a mausoleum in his honor by his son Tiberius Julius Aquila Polemaeanus.

== Biography ==
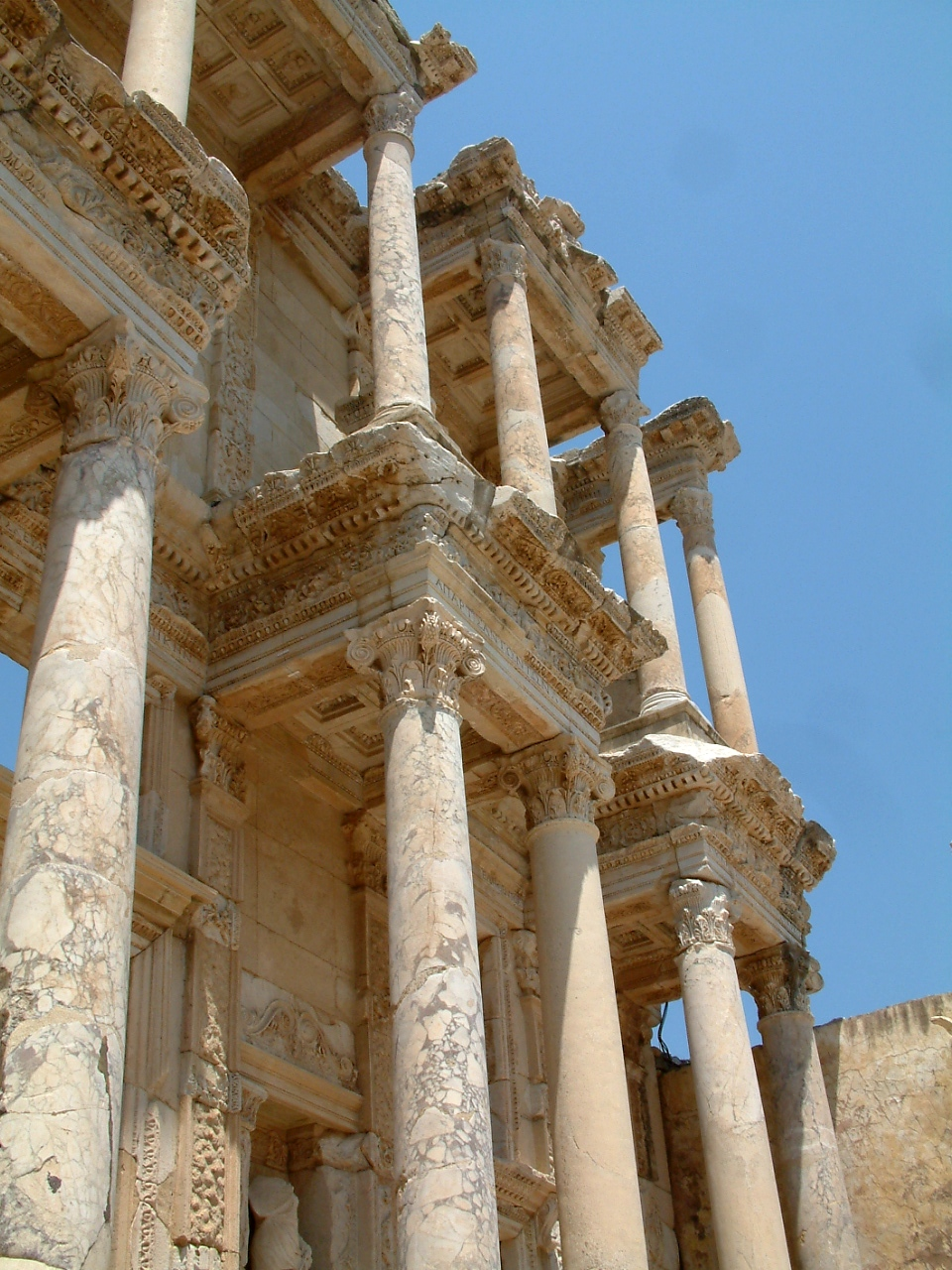
The Library of Celsus, which was founded by Celsus and completed by his son Tiberius Julius Aquila; the father is buried in a crypt beneath the library, in a decorated marble sarcophagus.

Tiberius Julius Celsus Polemaeanus was born around 45 CE to a family of Ancient Greek origin, in either Ephesus or Sardis. His ancestors were Romanized Greeks native of Sardis or Ephesus who belonged to a family of priests of Rome, and were originally from Sardis in Asia Minor. They had been granted Roman citizenship, and some of them held official positions in the service of the Roman Empire.

The cursus honorum of Celsus has been recorded in a Latin inscription recovered at Ephesus. According to it, his earliest recorded office was military tribune in Legio III Cyrenaica, which was part of the garrison of Roman Egypt. The next recorded event in his life was his adlection into the Senate inter aedilicios by the Roman Emperor Vespasian and his son Titus, which was a reward Vespasian is known to have made to individuals who supported him during the Year of the Four Emperors. Exactly how Celsus supported Vespasian is not known: the Roman governor of Egypt at the time, Tiberius Julius Alexander, was the first governor to declare publicly for Vespasian (1 July 69); a vexillation of Legio III Cyrenaica participated in the First Jewish–Roman War (66–73 CE), and Celsus may have come to Vespasian's notice that way. Regardless of the reason, promotion to the Senate was a significant social and political achievement for Celsus.

Following this, Celsus achieved the republican magistracy of praetor of the people of Rome, requiring his presence in the capital city. Then he was appointed praetorian legate to the provincial complex of Cappadociae et Galatiae Ponti, Pisidiae Paphlagoniae, Armeniae minoris, an aggregation of territories that later became the Roman provinces of Cappadocia, Galatia, Paphlagonia, and Armenia. This presents a problem: at this time (75-79 CE) the garrison of this territory included two legions, which implies this governorship would normally be assigned to someone who had previously been consul; further, the governor of Galatia at this time is known to be Marcus Hirrius Fronto Neratius Pansa. Mireille Corbier provides a possible explanation: Celsus was acting here as an independent, yet subordinate associate to Neratius Pansa.

The next steps in his career are less problematic. Celsus was then commissioned legatus legionis or commander of Legio IV Scythica (c. 81–82 CE); with this, Bernard Rémy observes, Celsus became the first known person from Anatolia to command a Roman legion. He returned to Rome where the sortition allotted him the province of Bithynia and Pontus—then one of the public provinces—as his to govern (84–85 CE). Celsus proceeded to Rome where the emperor Domitian appointed him one of the three prefects of the aerarium militare (85-87 CE), then returned to the East where he was governor of Cilicia from the years 89 to 91 CE. It was at this point that Celsus acceded to suffect consul.

After discharging his duties as consul, Celsus was admitted to the quindecimviri sacris faciundis, one of the four most prestigious collegia of priests of ancient Rome. His stay in Rome was further prolonged by serving as curator of the aedium sacrum et operum locorumque publicorum, or overseer of maintaining the temples, public buildings and places of Rome, an important administrative duty. However, by this point Domitian had grown suspicious of Senators and other powerful individuals to the point of paranoia, and Celsus quietly returned home to Ephesus.

With the reign of Trajan, Celsus returned to public life, and served a term as proconsular governor of Asia in 105–106 CE. He died some time before 117 CE, the year Gaius Julius Severus of Ancyra erected a monument mentioning Celsus Polemaeanus.

== Family ==
From the numerous inscriptions in Ephesus that relate to him, Corbier was able to determine many details of Celsus Polemaeanus' family. Celsus had married a Quintilla, possibly related to the provincial family known to have flourished at Alexandria Troas at this time. Together they had at least three children:

- Julia Quintilla Isauria. Corbier suggests she acquired the nickname "Isauria" because she was born while Celsus was legate of Cappadocia and the related territories. She married Tiberius Claudius Julianus; their grandson Tiberius Claudius Julianus was suffect consul in 154.
- Tiberius Julius Aquila Polemaeanus, suffect consul in 110.
- A daughter, who married a member of the gens Scribonia; their son Scribonianus is attested as procurator Augusti.

== Library of Celsus ==
The Library of Celsus in Ephesus was built to honor Tiberius Julius Celsus Polemaeanus after his death. He paid for the library from his own personal wealth, and bequeathed a large sum of money for its construction which was carried out by his son Julius Aquila Polemaeanus. The library was built to store 12,000 scrolls and to serve as a monumental tomb for Celsus, being both a crypt containing his sarcophagus and a sepulchral monument to his memory. The library collapsed after Ephesus was deserted but its façade was restored by an Austrian archaeology foundation in the 1970s.

Political offices
Preceded by Lucius Venuleius Montanus Apronianus, and Quintus Volusius Saturninus as suffect consuls	Suffect consul of the Roman Empire; 92 with Lucius Stertinius Avitus	Succeeded by Gaius Julius Silanus, and Quintus Junius Arulenus Rusticus as suffect consuls
