= Licinia Cornelia Volusia Torquata =

1st/2nd century Roman noble woman

Licinia Cornelia Volusia Torquata also known as Cornelia Volusia Torquata Licinia was a noble Roman woman who lived in the Roman Empire in the second half of the 1st century and first half of the 2nd century.

== Family background and early life ==
Torquata's ancestry is based on inference. According to Rudolf Hanslik, she is the granddaughter of Volusia Torquata and a Marcus Licinius; their surmised son, also named Marcus Licinius, who was also pontifex, was Torquata's father. The name element "Torquata" comes from her great-grandmother Torquata, the wife of Quintus Volusius Saturninus.

== Marriage and offspring ==
Torquata married her cousin Lucius Volusius Saturninus, an Augur during the second century AD, and a Suffect consul during the reign of Trajan. Marcus Metilius Aquillius Regulus Nepos Volusius Torquatus Fronto who served as a consul in 157, is thought to be their descendant.

== Inscriptional evidence ==
The name of Torquata has been found in a funerary inscription in Rome now on display at the National Museum of Rome. The inscription is dated from the second half of the 1st century through the first half of the 2nd century and reads in Latin (English translation follows):

Licinia Cornelia/M(arci) f(ilia) Volusia/Torquata/L(uci) Volusi co(n)s(ulis)/auguris

Licinia Cornelia Volusia Torquata, the daughter of Marcus, the wife of Lucius Volusius, consul, augur.

== Sources ==
- Funerary inscription of Licinia Cornelia Volusia Torquata
- Biographischer Index der Antike (Google eBook), Walter de Gruyter, 2001
- J. Elsner & J. Huskinson Life, Death and Representation: Some New Work on Roman Sarcophagi, Walter de Gruyter, 2011
