= Lucius Volusius Saturninus (pontiff) =

1st century AD Roman senator

Lucius Volusius Saturninus was a senator of the early Roman Empire, who was active during the Principate. He was a member of the College of Pontiffs.

Saturninus was a member of the gens Volusia, a praetorian family Tacitus describes as ancient and having a distinguished reputation. He was the first son born to Roman statesman Lucius Volusius Saturninus, suffect consul in AD 3, and Cornelia; he is known to have had one brother, Quintus Volusius Saturninus consul in 56. Saturninus must have had children, for Lucius Volusius Torquatus, suffect consul in some nundinum in the first half of the second century, is considered his grandson.

Beyond holding the priesthood of Pontiff, which was a high honor, nothing further is known of his senatorial activities. Rudolf Hanslik opines that Saturninus died before his father, explaining why he never advanced to the consulate.
