= Volusia Cornelia =

Roman woman of Patrician status who lived in the late 1st century AD

Volusia Cornelia, also known as Cornelia Volusia was a Roman woman of Patrician status who lived in the late 1st century. She was the daughter of the senator Quintus Volusius Saturninus, suffect consul in 92. She was born and raised in Rome. Her cognomen Cornelia, she inherited from paternal great-grandmother Cornelia Lentula, the daughter of the consul of 3 BC, Lucius Cornelius Lentulus from the gens Cornelia.

== Inscriptionals ==
Volusia is known through various surviving inscriptions. The evidence reveals she was a wealthy, distinguished woman of the Senatorial class. She owned a private luxurious villa in Nemi, the previous possession of the Roman emperor Caligula. In an area of the villa, Volusia restored a theatre. The theatre was used to entertained guests that happened to be at the villa, such as family members, friends sharing a vacation, neighboring villa-owners and notables invited to dinner. After the theatre was restored, her deed was recorded in a monumental inscription. which has decorative handles. One branch of the Volusii family had a praedium in the area of Nemi and a fistulae bearing the name of Volusia was also found.

The inscription which is dated from the mid-1st century reads in Latin which is translated in English:

volvsia q. f. cornelia theatrvm
vetvstate corrvptvm restitvit et excolivit

Volusia Cornelia, daughter of Quintus, restored and decorated the theatre damaged by age.

The plaque is on display at the National Museum of Rome. She was also a donor at the Sanctuary of Diana at Nemi.

The below funeral inscription is dedicated to commemorate the hairdresser of Volusia. The Latin inscription which is found in Rome reads in English:

To the Departed Spirits.
Elate, hairdresser of Cornelia Volusia
lived twenty years. Hellanicus (made this)
for a well-deserving wife. (CIL VI, 7296, Rome)

== Sources ==
- The World of Class - Images of Class: Patrons - Volusia Cornelia
- B. Levick, Tiberius the Politician, Routledge, 1999
- Biographischer Index der Antike (Google eBook), Walter de Gruyter, 2001
- A. Marzano, Roman Villas in Central Italy: A Social and Economic History, BRILL, 2007
- C.M.C. Green, Roman Religion and the Cult of Diana of Aricia, Cambridge University Press, 2007
- S.R. Joshel, Slavery in the Roman World, Cambridge University Press, 2010
