= Lucius Venuleius Montanus Apronianus =

1st century Roman senator and suffect consul

Lucius Venuleius Montanus Apronianus was a Roman senator of the first century. He was suffect consul for the nundinium of January to April AD 92 with Qunintus Volusius Saturninus, replacing the emperor Domitian.

The Venuleii were, in the words of Ronald Syme, "an eminent and opulent family at Pisae". Apronianus' father was Lucius Montanus, proconsul of Bithynia et Pontus in the early years of Nero's reign which was confirmed by the proper understanding of a set of inscriptions from Pisa, which also confirmed his mother's name as Laetilla. As Apronianus was co-opted into the Arval Brethren in 80, it makes him unique in his generation for being the only known member of that priesthood whose father was a senator. He constructed the Caldaccoli Aqueduct to Pisa in 92 AD as he was patron of the Pisan colony, and consul of Attidium (Roman city near Fabriano), according to an inscription (CIL XI 1433).

In a paper published in 1968, Syme suggested that he may be identified as the otherwise unknown Montanus, to whom Pliny the Younger wrote two letters (Epistulae VII.29, VIII.6) complaining about an inscription set up by the Senate praising Pallas, the freedman of Claudius, whom they both detested.

Apronianus may be the proconsul of Achaea of 89/90, attested in an inscription where the name is lost: according to the Acta Arvalia, he was absent from their ceremonies from June 90 to November 91. He may also have been adlected into the patrician class by Vespasian.

His wife's name is known to have been Celerina; it is not known if he had any children. Although Syme believed Lucius Venuleius Apronianus Octavius Priscus, consul 123, was possibly his son, Schied has shown that this is not likely.

The Venuleii family owned the magnificent villa-estate at Massaciuccoli.

This is probably the same Montanus described by Juvenal in his fourth satire:

Latin

nouerat ille
luxuriam inperii ueterem noctesque Neronis
iam medias aliamque famem, cum pulmo Falerno
arderet. nulli maior fuit usus edendi
tempestate mea: Circeis nata forent an
Lucrinum ad saxum Rutupinoue edita fundo
ostrea callebat primo deprendere morsu,
et semel aspecti litus dicebat echini.

English
Well known to him were the old debauches of the Imperial Court, which Nero carried on to midnight till a second hunger came and veins were heated with hot Falernian. No one in my time had more skill in the eating art than he. He could tell at the first bite whether an oyster had been bred at Circeii, or on the Lucrine rocks, or on the beds of Rutupiae; one glance would tell him the native shore of a sea-urchin.

Political offices
Preceded by Domitian XVI, and Quintus Volusius Saturninus as ordinary consuls	Suffect consul of the Roman Empire; 92 with Quintus Volusius Saturninus	Succeeded by Lucius Stertinius Avitus, and Tiberius Julius Celsus Polemaeanus as suffect consuls
