= Lucius Venuleius Apronianus Octavius Priscus (consul 123) =

Ordinary consul in 123 (90–139)

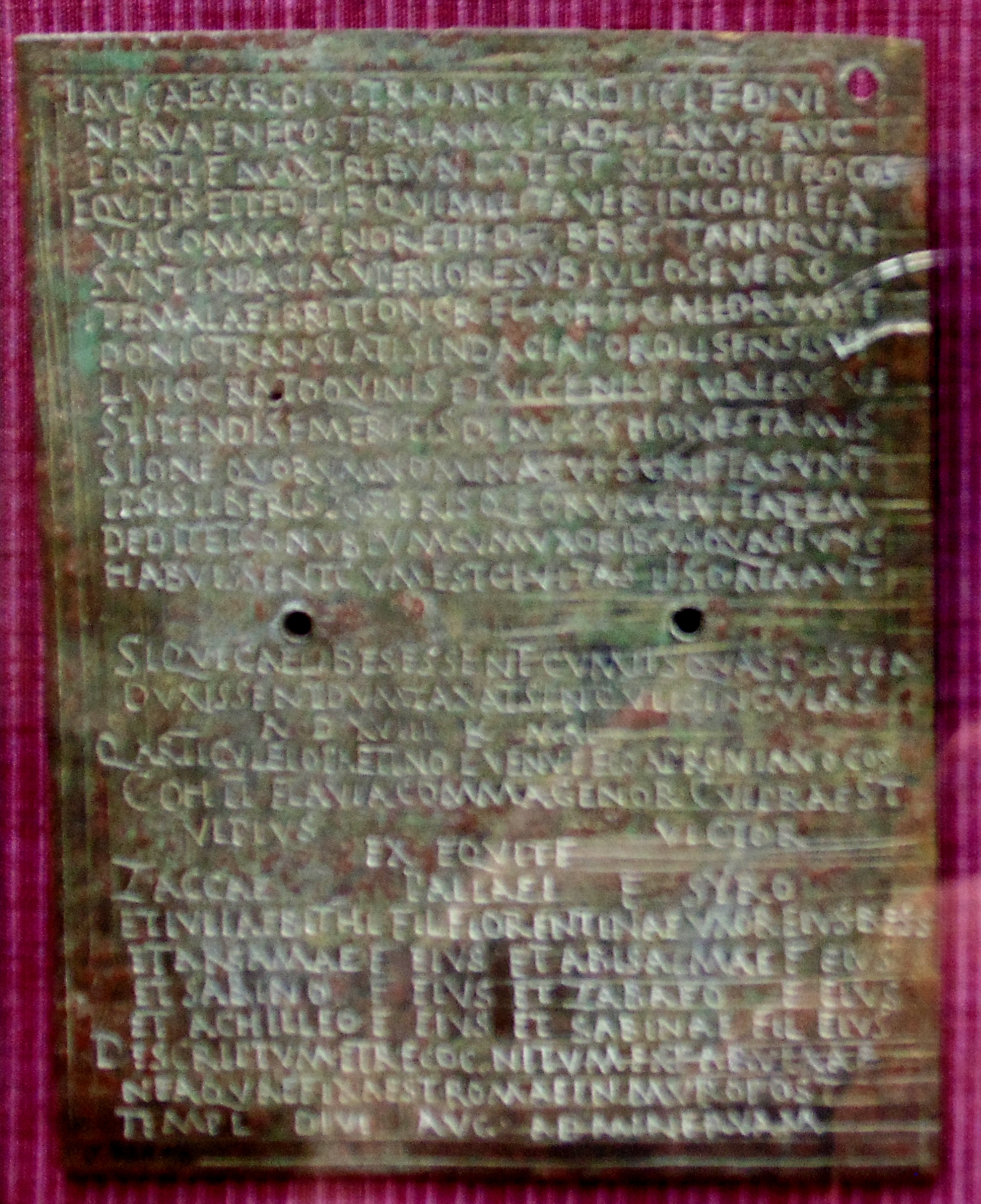
- Military diploma RMM 22, dated April 14th 123, attesting him as ordinary consul

ordinary consul

Lucius Venuleius Apronianus Octavius Priscus was a Roman senator of the second century. He was ordinary consul as the colleague of Quintus Articuleius Paetinus in 123. Subsequent to his consulate, Priscus was proconsular governor of Asia in 138 and 139. He is known primarily through inscriptions.

While Ronald Syme suggested that Priscus was the son of Lucius Venuleius Montanus Apronianus, suffect consul in 92, J. Scheid has shown this is unlikely; nevertheless, Priscus was a member of the patrician class. Further there is "no doubt" that Priscus is the father of Lucius Venuleius Apronianus Octavius Priscus, suffect consul around 145 and ordinary consul in 168.

The Venuleii family owned the magnificent villa-estate at Massaciuccoli.

Political offices
Preceded by Gaius Trebius Maximus, and Titus Calestrius Tiro Orbius Speratus as suffect consuls	Consul of the Roman Empire; AD 123 with Quintus Articuleius Paetinus	Succeeded by Titus Prifernius Geminus, and Publius Metilius Secundus as suffect consuls
