= Lucius Volusius Saturninus (Augur) =

Lucius Volusius Saturninus was a Suffect consul and Augur who lived in the Roman Empire in the second half of the 1st century and possibly in the first half of the 2nd century. He is known only through inscriptions. Saturninus was the grandson of Lucius Volusius Saturninus, consul in 87; the name of his father, which is nowhere attested, is thought to have been Lucius Volusius Torquatus.

Saturninus married his cousin Licinia Cornelia Volusia Torquata. Her funerary inscription, now on display at the National Museum of Rome, attests to his offices. Marcus Metilius Aquillius Regulus Nepos Volusius Torquatus Fronto who served as a consul in 157, is thought to be their descendant.

== Sources ==
- Funerary inscription of Licinia Cornelia Volusia Torquata
- J. Elsner & J. Huskinson Life, Death and Representation: Some New Work on Roman Sarcophagi, Walter de Gruyter, 2011
