= List of Roman governors of Asia =

This is a list of known governors of the Roman province of Asia. Created after 133 BC, the province was eventually reorganized by the emperor Augustus who assigned it to the Senate as a proconsular governorship. The province was divided by Diocletian during his reorganization of the empire during the 290s, and a small portion of the province retained the name. Eventually the province was absorbed into the Thracesian Theme sometime during the seventh century. Many of the dates listed are approximate dates for the holding of the office.

== Republican governors of Asia (133–27 BC) ==
Unless otherwise indicated, entries for the Republican period are based on T.R.S. Broughton, Magistrates of the Roman Republic (1952), vol. II.

- Quintus Mucius Scaevola Augur (97/96 BC)
- ? Lucius Gellius (93/92 BC). Alternatively proconsul in Cilicia.
- Gaius Julius Caesar (91/90 BC)
- L. Lucilius L.f. (? 90/89 BC)
- C. Cassius (89–87 BC). Appian calls him "Lucius Cassius".
- Lucius Licinius Murena (84/83 BC)
- ? L. Cornelius Lentulus (82/81 BC). Uncertain if proconsul in Asia or Africa.
- Marcus Minucius Thermus (80/79 BC)
- Gaius Claudius Nero (79/78 BC)
- ? Terentius Varro (77/76 BC)
- Marcus Junius Silanus (76/75 BC)
- M. Juncus (75/74 BC)
- Lucius Licinius Lucullus (73–69 BC)
- Publius Cornelius Dolabella (? 69/68 BC)
- Titus Aufidius (66/65 BC)
- Publius Varinius (65/64 BC)
- ? P. Orbius (64/63 BC)
- P. Servilius Globulus (63/62 BC)
- Lucius Valerius Flaccus (62/61 BC)
- Quintus Tullius Cicero (61–58 BC)
- Gaius Fabius Hadrianus (57/56 BC)
- Gaius Septimius (56/55 BC)
- Gaius Claudius Pulcher (55–53 BC)
- Quintus Minucius Thermus (52–49 BC)
- Lucius Antonius (49 BC): proquaestor pro praetore, left in command by Thermus
- Appuleius (47/46 BC): proquaestor pro praetore
- Publius Servilius Isauricus (46–44 BC): propraetor, then proconsul
- Gaius Trebonius (44/43 BC): murdered by Cornelius Dolabella January 43 BC
- ? M. Turius (42/41 BC): driven out of Asia by the Parthians
- Lucius Munatius Plancus (39/38 BC). Ronald Syme dates Plancus 39–37 BC. Broughton speculates he "probably took command in Asia as the Parthians retreated."
- Marcus Cocceius Nerva (38/37 BC)
- Gaius Furnius (35/34 BC). Syme dates Furnius 36–35 BC.
- ? Marcus Titius (34 BC)
- Asinius (Maurucinus ?) (34/33 BC)

== Imperial proconsular governors of Asia (27 BC — AD 180) ==
=== Governors under Augustus ===
Unless otherwise stated, the following entries are taken from K.M.T. Atkinson, "The Governors of the Province Asia in the Reign of Augustus", Historia: Zeitschrift für Alte Geschichte, 7 (1958), pp. 300–330

Name	Date proconsul	Date consul	Notes
Vedius Pollio	31/30 BC	N/A	propraetor
Marcus Herennius Picens	? 28/27 BC	suff. 34 BC	Broughton dates his tenure to 33/32 BC
Lucius Vinicius	? 27/26 BC	suff. 33 BC	
Lucius Volcacius Tullus	? 26/25 BC	ord. 33 BC	
Marcus Tullius Cicero	? 24/23 BC	ord. 30 BC	
Sextus Appuleius	? 23/22 BC	ord. 29 BC	
Gaius Junius Silanus	? 22/21 BC	ord. 17 BC	
Potitus Valerius Messalla	? 21-19 BC	suff. 29 BC	
Gaius Norbanus Flaccus	? 18/17 or 17/16 BC	ord. 24 BC	
Quintus Aemilius Lepidus	15/14 or 14/13 BC	ord. 21 BC	If the subject of the acephalous Titulus Tibertinus (ILS 918) is Gaius Sentius Saturninus (cos. 19 BC), then he was proconsul in 14/13 BC.
Gaius Marcius Censorinus	? 13/12 BC	ord. 8 BC	Syme dates Censorinus to 2/3 BC
Marcus Vinicius	? 12-10 BC	suff. 19 BC	Claude Eilers dates Vinicius to 13/12 BC
Paullus Fabius Maximus	10/9 BC	ord. 11 BC	
Paullus Fabius Maximus	? 9/8 BC	ord. 11 BC	If the subject of the acephalous Titulus Tibertinus is Lucius Calpurnius Piso (cos. 15 BC), then he was proconsul in 9/8 BC
Publius Cornelius Scipio	? 8/7 BC	ord. 16 BC	Eilers dates Scipio to 12-10 BC
Iullus Antonius	? 7/6 BC	ord. 10 BC	
Gaius Asinius Gallus Saloninus	6/5 BC	ord. 8 BC	
Gnaeus Cornelius Lentulus Augur	2/1 BC	ord. 14 BC	Lentulus the Augur is often confused with his relative L. Cornelius Lentulus, cos. 15 BC
Publius Sulpicius Quirinius	? AD 1/2	ord. 12 BC	If the subject of the acephalous Titulus Tibertinus is Quirnius, then he was proconsul this year.
Gaius Antistius Vetus	AD 2/3 or 3/4	ord. 6 BC	
Marcus Plautius Silvanus	AD 4/5	ord. 2 BC	
Gaius Vibius Postumus	? AD 6-9	suff. AD 5	Syme dates Postumus to AD 12-15
Lucius Calpurnius Piso	? AD 9/10	ord. 1 BC	Syme dates Piso to AD 1/2
Publius Vinicius	? AD 10/11	ord. AD 2	Son of the proconsul of 12-10 BC
Lucius Valerius Messalla Volesus	? AD 12/13	suff. AD 5	Son of the proconsul of 21-19 BC
Lucius Volusius Saturninus	? AD 13/14	suff. AD 3	

=== Governors under Tiberius ===
Unless otherwise stated, the following entries are taken from Ronald Syme, "Problems about Proconsuls of Asia", Zeitschrift für Papyrologie und Epigraphik, 53 (1983), pp. 191–208

Name	Date proconsul	Date consul	Notes
Sextus Nonius Quinctilianus	? 16/17	ord. 8	
Quintus Poppaeus Secundus	? 17/18	suff. 9	
Gaius Junius Silanus	20/21	ord. 10	
Manius Aemilius Lepidus	21/22	ord. 11	
Gaius Fonteius Capito	23/24 or 22/23	ord. 12	
Favonius	24/25 or 25/26	unknown	Syme (1983, p. 200) identifies with Lucilius Longus, suff. 7 BC
Sextus Pompeius	24/25 or 24/26	ord. 14	Syme (History in Ovid, p. 161) suggests Pompeius was prorogued two years.
Marcus Aemilius Lepidus	26-28	cos. 6	Ursula Vogel-Weidemann suggests Lepidus may have been prorogued a third year.
Publius Petronius	? 29-35	suff. 19	
Marcus Aurelius Cotta Maximus Messalinus	? 35/36	ord. 20	
Gaius Vibius Rufinus	? 36/37	suff. 21 or 22	

=== Governors under Caligula ===
Unless otherwise stated, the following entries are taken from Syme, "Problems about Proconsuls", pp. 191–208

Name	Date proconsul	Date consul	Notes
Gaius Calpurnius Aviola	37/38	suff. 24	
Gaius Asinius Pollio	? 38/39	ord. 23	
Marcus Vinicius	? 39/40	ord. 30; ord. II 45	
Gaius Cassius Longinus	40/41	suff. 30	

=== Governors under Claudius ===
Unless otherwise stated, the following entries are taken from Syme, "Problems about Proconsuls", pp. 191–208

Name	Date proconsul	Date consul	Notes
Publius Cornelius Lentulus Scipio	? 41/42	suff. 24	
Gaius Sallustius Crispus Passienus	? 42/43	suff. 27	
Paullus Fabius Persicus	? 43/44	ord. 34	
Publius Memmius Regulus	? 48/49	suff. 31	
Aulus Didius Gallus	49/50	suff. 39	
Gnaeus Domitius Corbulo	50/51	suff. 39	
Publius Suillius Rufus	51/52	suff. 41	
Lucius Pedanius Secundus	52/53	suff. 43	
Tiberius Plautius Silvanus Aelianus	53/54	suff. 45; suff. II 74	Ursula Vogel-Weidemann dates to 55/56

=== Governors under Nero and the Year of Four Emperors ===
Unless otherwise stated, the following entries are taken from Syme, "Problems about Proconsuls", pp. 191–208

Name	Date proconsul	Date consul	Notes
Marcus Junius Silanus	54	cos. 46	Died in office
? Marius Cordus	55/56	suff. 45 or 47	
? M. Vettius Niger	56/57	unknown	
Q. Allius Maximus	57/58	suff. 49	So Ursula Vogel-Weidemann; Syme ("Problems about Proconsuls", p. 204) is dubious
Lucius Vipstanus Poplicola	58/59	cos. 48	
Quintus Marcius Barea Soranus	? 61/62	suff. 52	
P. Volasenna	? 62/63	suff. c. 54	
Lucius Salvius Otho Titianus	63/64	cos. 52	
Lucius Antistius Vetus	64/65	cos. 55	
Manius Acilius Aviola	65/66	cos. 54	
Marcus Aefulanus	? 66/67	suff. 54	
Marcus Aponius Saturninus	? 67/68	suff. c. 55	Eck, Chiron 1983, p. 189; p. 213: "unter Nero"
Gaius Fonteius Agrippa	69	suff. 58	Called to Moesia in Autumn, 69 (Tacitus, Histories, iii.46)
Marcus Plancius Varus	69	N/A	Legatus proconsulis serving in Agrippa's absence; attested by coins from Apamea

=== Governors under Vespasian and Titus ===
Unless otherwise stated, the following entries are taken from Werner Eck, "Jahres- und Provinzialfasten der senatorischen Statthalter von 69/70 bis 138/139", Chiron, 12 (1982), pp. 284–303

Name	Date proconsul	Date consul	Notes
Marcus Suillius Nerullinus	69/70	ord. 50	Appointed to complete the term
Titus Clodius Eprius Marcellus	70-73	suff. 62	
Aulus Ducenius Geminus	73/74	suff. 60 or 61	
Marcus Vettius Bolanus	75/76	suff. 66	
Tiberius Catius Asconius Silius Italicus	77/78	suff. 68	
Gnaeus Arrius Antoninus	78/79	suff. 69	
Marcus Ulpius Trajanus	79/80	suff. c. 70	
Gaius Laecanius Bassus Caecina Paetus	80/81	suff. 70	

=== Governors under Domitian ===
Unless otherwise stated, the following entries are taken from Eck, "Jahres- und Provinzialfasten", pp. 304–323

Name	Date proconsul	Date consul	Notes
Sextus Julius Frontinus	84/85	suff. 73	
Publius Nonius Asprenas Caesius Cassianus	86/87	suff. 72 or 73	
Gaius Vettulenus Civica Cerealis	87/88	suff. between 73 and 76	Removed before the completion of his term
Gaius Minicius Italus	88	N/A	Equestrian procurator of Asia, replaced Cerealis
Lucius Mestrius Florus	88/89	suff. between 73 and 76	
Marcus Fulvius Gillo	89/90	suff. 76	
Lucius Luscius Ocrea	90/91	suff. 77 or 78	
Publius Calvisius Ruso Julius Frontinus	92/93	suff. c. 84	
Lucius Junius Caesennius Paetus	93/94	suff. 79	
Marcus Atilius Postumus Bradua	94/95	suff. 80	
Rufus	? 91/91 or ? 95/96	unknown	Eck suggests either Quintus Corellius Rufus (suff. 78), or C. Marius Marcellus Octavius Rufus (suff. 80)

=== Governors under Nerva and Trajan ===
Unless otherwise stated, the following entries are taken from Eck, "Jahres- und Provinzialfasten", pp. 324–362

Name	Date proconsul	Date consul	Notes
Lucius Calventius Sextus Carminius Vetus	96/97	suff. 83	
Gnaeus Pedanius Fuscus Salinator	98/99	suff. c. 84	
Q. Julius Balbus	100/101	suff. 85	
[Q. Vibius?] Secun(dus)	101/102	suff. 86	
C. Aquillius Proculus	103/104	suff. 90	
L. Albius Pullaienus Pollio	104/105	suff. 90	
Tiberius Julius Celsus Polemaeanus	105/106	suff. 92	
[L. Dasumius?] Hadrianus	106/107	unknown	If identical with the suffect, his consulate was before 87
Lucius Nonius Calpurnius Torquatus Asprenas	107/108	cos. 94	
Marcus Lollius Paulinus Decimus Valerius Asiaticus Saturninus	108/109	suff. 94	
Gaius Antius Aulus Julius Quadratus	109/110	suff. 94	
Lucius Baebius Tullus	110/111	suff. 95	
Quintus Fabius Postuminus	111/112	suff. 96	
Cornelius Tacitus	112/113	suff. 97	
Aulus Vicirius Martialis	113/114	suff. 98	
M. (Ostorius) Scapula	114/115	suff. 99	
Quintus Fulvius Gillo Bittius Proculus	115/116	suff. 99	
Ti. Julius Ferox	116/117	suff. 99	

=== Governors under Hadrian ===
Unless otherwise stated, the following entries are taken from Eck, "Jahres- und Provinzialfasten der senatorischen Statthalter von 69/70 bis 138/139", Chiron, 13 (1983), pp. 147–185

Name	Date proconsul	Date consul	Notes
Q. Servaeus Innocens	117/118	suff. 101	
Galeo Tettienus Severus	118/119	suff. 102	
Gaius Trebonius Proculus Mettius Modestus	119/120	suff. 103	
Sextus Subrius Dexter Cornelius Priscus	120/121	suff. c. 104	
Q. Licinius Silvanus Granianus	121/122	suff. 106	
Gaius Minicius Fundanus	122/123	suff. 107	
Quintus Pompeius Falco	123/124	suff. 108	
Marcus Peducaeus Priscinus	124/125	ord. 110	
Titus Avidius Quietus	125/126	suff. 111	
Publius Stertinius Quartus	126/127	suff. 112	
Lucius Vipstanus Messalla	127/128	ord. 115	
Lucius Hedius Rufus Lollianus Avitus	128/129	suff. 114	
Publius Juventius Celsus	129/130	suff. 115; ord. II 129	
Publius Afranius Flavianus	130/131	suff. 117	
Lucius Fundanius Lamia Aelianus	131/132	ord. 116	
Gaius Julius Alexander Berenicianus	132/133	suff. 116	
Titus Sabinius Barbarus	133/134	suff. 118	
Quintus Coredius Gallus Gargilius Antiquus	134/135	suff. 119	
Titus Aurelius Fulvus	135/136	ord. 120	
Quintus Pomponius Marcellus Rufus	136/137	suff. 121	

=== Governors under Antoninus Pius ===
Unless otherwise stated, the following entries are taken from Syme "The Proconsuls of Asia under Antoninus Pius", Zeitschrift für Papyrologie und Epigraphik, 51 (1983), 271-290

Name	Date proconsul	Date consul	Notes
Lucius Venuleius Apronianus Octavius Priscus	138/139	ord. 123	
Lucius Valerius Propinquus	140/141	suff. 126	
? Sextus Julius Major	141/142	suff. c. 126	It is possible he was proconsul of Africa instead.
? Q. Insteius Celer	142/143	suff. c. 128	
? Tiberius Julius Candidus Celsus	143/144	suff. c. 129	
(Tiberius Claudius?) Julianus	144/145	suff. 129/130	
Tiberius Claudius Quartinus	145/146	suff. 130	
Lucius Antonius Albus	147/148	suff. c. 132	
Q. Flavius Tertullus	148/149	suff. 133	
Popillius Priscus	149/150	suff. c. 132	
Lucius Tutilius Lupercus Pontianus	150/151	ord. 135	
Titus Vitrasius Pollio	151/152	suff. c. 137	
Gaius Julius Severus	152/153	suff. c. 138	
Lucius Statius Quadratus	155/156	ord. 142	
Gaius Bellicius Flaccus Torquatus	156/157	ord. 143	
Titus Statilius Maximus	157/158	ord. 144	
Publius Mummius Sisenna Rutilianus	160/161	suff. 146	

=== Governors under Marcus Aurelius ===
Unless otherwise stated, the following entries are taken from Alföldy, Konsulat und Senatorenstand unter den Antoninen (Bonn: Habelt Verlag, 1977) pp. 214–217 (before 167) and Filippini, “Su alcuni proconsoli d’Asia all’epoca di Marco Aurelio (168-173)” (Roma, 2014) p. 764 (after 167)

Name	Date proconsul	Date consul	Notes
Quintus Cornelius Proculus	161/162	suff. 146	
Gaius Popilius Carus Pedo	162/163	suff. 147	
Quintus Pompeius Sosius Priscus	163/164	ord. 149	
Marcus Gavius Squilla Gallicanus	164/165	ord. 150	
D. Fonteius Fronto	165/166	suff. c. 150	Of Asia, per French; Christol and Drew-Bear argue Fronto was one of the first proconsuls of Lycia et Pamphylia.
Titus Pomponius Proculus Vitrasius Pollio	167/168	suff. c. 151	
Servilius Paullus (M. Servilius Silanus?)	? 168/169	(suff. 152, ord. II 188)	
Sextus Quintilius Valerius Maximus	169/170	ord. 151	
Marcus Nonius Macrinus	170/171	suff. 154	
Gratus	171/172	suff. c. 154-157?	
A. Junius Rufinus	? 172/173	ord. 153	
Sextus Sulpicius Tertullus	? 173/174	ord. 158	
Vibius Bassus	between 155 and 175	suff. between 138 and 160	

== Imperial proconsular governors of Asia (180 — 285) ==
=== Governors under Commodus ===
Unless otherwise stated, the following entries are taken from Paul M. M. Leunissen, Konsuln und Konsulare in der Zeit von Commodus bis Severus Alexander (Amsterdam: J.C. Gieben, 1989), pp. 221f

Name	Date proconsul	Date consul	Notes
Publius Julius Geminius Marcianus	c. 182	suff. 165 or 166	
Novius P[riscus]	between 180 and 183	suff. between 166 and 168	
L. A[e]milius [Frontus]	between 182 and 185	suff. between 161 and 166	
Quintus Pompeius Senecio Sosius Priscus	c. 184	ord. 169	
Gaius Arrius Antoninus	between 188 and 190	suff. c. 173	
(L.?) (Ulpius?) Marcellus	189/190	suff. c. 174	perhaps the same as Ulpius Marcellus (Leunissen, pp. 221f)
Sulpicius Crassus	190/191 or 191/192	suff. c. 175/176	
Titus Flavius Claudius Sulpicianus	Between 180 and 192	suff. between 165 and 175	Inge Mennen dates to 186
Asellius Aemilianus	192/193	suff. c. 177	Supported Pescennius Niger in 193. (HA, "Severus", 8)

=== Governors under Septimius Severus ===
Unless otherwise stated, the following entries are taken from Ségolène Demougin, "Proconsuls d'Asie sous Septime Sévère, les gouverneurs de la province de 200 à 211", Bulletin de la Société Nationale des Antiquaires de France, 1994 (1996), pp. 323-333

Name	Date proconsul	Date consul	Notes
Lucius Albinius Saturninus	between 190 and 200	suff. between 175 and 182	
Lucius Aemilius Iuncus	193/194	suff. 179	
Quintus Aurelius Polus Terentianus	200/201	suff. between 188 and 190	
Quintus Hedius Rufus Lollianus Gentianus	201/202	suff. c. 186	
Tarius Titianus	? 202/203	suff. between 187 and 190	Michel Christol and Thomas Drew-Bear note he might have been governor of Africa
L. Calpurnius Proculus	? 203/204	between 186 and 190	
Q. Licinius Nepos	? 204/205	between 180 and 191	Demougin notes Nepos could have been consul at the beginning of the reign of Septimius Severus, which would require a later date.
Popilius Pedo Apronianus	205	ord. 191	Executed while proconsul
Aelius Aglaus	205/206	N/A	procurator Asiae, agens uice praedisidis
Quintus Tineius Sacerdos	206/207	suff. 192	Christol and Drew-Bear date between 206 and 208
[...]us	207/208	unknown	Christol and Drew-Bear note he could be identified with a known proconsul
Quintus Caecilius Secundus Servilianus	208/209	suff. c. 193	
[Sem]pronius Senecio	209/210	suff. c. 195/196	C.P Jones has shown that Ti. Manilius Fuscus was not proconsul of Asia.

=== Governors under Caracalla ===
Unless otherwise stated, the following entries are taken from Paul M. M. Leunissen, Konsuln und Konsulare in der Zeit von Commodus bis Severus Alexander (Amsterdam: J.C. Gieben, 1989), pp. 224f

Name	Date proconsul	Date consul	Notes
T. [...]	attested 211	suff. c. 195	
C. Gabinius Barbarus Pompeianus	? 211/212	suff. 194	
Gavius Tranquillus	? 212/213	suff. c. 197	
(M.?) Junius Concessus Aemillianus	? 213/214	suff. c. 198	
Lucius Marius Maximus Perpetuus Aurelianus	213-215	suff. c. 199	
Gaius Julius Avitus Alexianus	215/216	suff. c. 200	

=== Governors under Macrinus and Elagabalus ===
Unless otherwise stated, the following entries are taken from Paul M. M. Leunissen, Konsuln und Konsulare in der Zeit von Commodus bis Severus Alexander (Amsterdam: J.C. Gieben, 1989), pp. 225f

Name	Date proconsul	Date consul	Notes
Gaius Julius Asper	217/218	ord. II 212	designatus
Quintus Anicius Faustus	217-219	suff. 198?	
M. Aufidius Fronto	between 219 and 222	ord. 199	
C. Aufidius Marcellus	between 219 and 222	suff. c. 205; ord. II 226	
(M. Nummius Umbrius Primus Senecio?) Albinus	c. 221	? ord. 206	Mentioned in the Constitutio Antoniniana; identification with the consul of 206 uncertain.

=== Governors under Alexander Severus ===
Unless otherwise stated, the following entries are taken from Paul M. M. Leunissen, Konsuln und Konsulare in der Zeit von Commodus bis Severus Alexander (Amsterdam: J.C. Gieben, 1989), pp. 226-228

Name	Date proconsul	Date consul	Notes
Quintus (Hedius) Lollianus Plantius Avitus	c. 224	ord. 209	
Q. Ai[acius Modestus Crescentianus?]	between 211 and 228	suff. between 198 and 204; II ord. 228	
Amicus	Autumn 230 or 231	suff. 215 or 216	
Marcus Clodius Pupienus Maximus	c. 229	suff. between 193 and 217; II ord. 234	
(Q. Virius Egnatius?) Sulpicius Priscus	Between 222 and 235	suff. between 193 and 217	
Gaius Asinius Nicomachus Julianus	After 222	suff. between 193 and 235	

=== Third-century crisis (235–285) ===
- Lucius Valerius Messalla Apollinaris (between 236 and 238).
- Flavius Balbus Diogenianus (between 236 and 238; less likely 250–1)
- Marcus Asinius Sabinianus (239 or 240)
- Lucius Egnatius Victor Lollianus (242–245)
- Tiberius Flavius Montanus Maximianus (245/246 or 246/247)
- Flavius Maximillianus Montanus (248/249)
- Gaius Julius Flavius Proculus Quintilianus (249–250)
- Gaius Julius Octavius Volusenna Rogatianus (c. 253/256)
- Attius Rufinus (250s)
- Marcus Valerius Turbo (250s)
- Maximillianus (? 260)
- (?) Tiberius Pollienus Armenius Peregrinus (unknown date, possibly under Valerian)
- Arellius Fuscus (275)
- Faltonius Probus (276)
- Julius Proculus (276)
- Asclepiodotus (283) (praeses)

== Imperial proconsular governors of Asia (285 — 395) ==
=== Governors under Diocletian ===
- Aurelius Hermogenianus (c. 286/305)
- Titus Flavius Festus (c. 286/293)
- Priscus (c. 286/305)
- Lucius Artorius Pius Maximus (c. 287/298)
- Junius Tiberianus (c. 293/303)
- Annius Epifanius (c. 293/305)

=== Governors under Constantine I ===
- Amnius Manius Caesonius Nicomachus Anicius Paulinus (c. 324/334)
- Quintus Fabius Titianus (c. 324/337)

=== Governors under Constantius II ===
- Lucius Caelius Montius (c. 340/350)
- Marinus (c. 351/354)
- Flavius Magnus (c. 354/359)
- Mantitheus (before 355)
- Julianus (360)

=== Governors under Julian and Jovian ===
- Aelius Claudius Dulcitius (361—363)
- Vitalius (363)

=== Governors under Valens ===
- Helpidius (364)
- Hormisdas (365)
- Clearchus (366—367)
- Eutropius (c. 371/372)
- Festus (372—378)

=== Governors under Theodosius I ===
- Septimius Maeadius (c. 379/386)
- Nummius Aemilianus Dexter (c. 379/387)
- Auxonius (381)
- Nicomachus Flavianus (382—383)
- Victorius (392—394)
- Aurelianus (395)

== Imperial proconsular governors of Asia (395 — 491) ==
=== Governors under Arcadius ===
- Aeternalis (396)
- Simplicius (396)
- Nebridius (396)
- Julianus (397)
- Anatolius (c. 395/408)
- Flavius Anthemius Isidorus (c. 405/410)

=== Governors under Theodosius II ===
- Flavius Heliodorus (c. 439/442)
- Proculus (449)

== Imperial proconsular governors of Asia (uncertain date) ==
- (?) Scaurianus (? late third century)
- Cassianus (third/fourth century)
- Cossinius Rufinus (? middle/late third century)
- Axiochus (? late fourth century)
- Ambrosius (? late fourth century)
- Messalinus (fourth/fifth century)
- Aristus (fourth/fifth century)
- Constantinus (fourth/fifth century)
- Nonnus (early fifth century)
- (?) Ignatius (early/mid fifth century)
- (?) Zosimianus (early/mid fifth century)
- Andreas (? fifth century)
- Flavius Axius Arcadius Phlegethius (late fifth/early sixth century)
- Damocharis (fourth/sixth century)
- Theodosius (fifth/sixth century)

== See also ==
- Lists of ancient Roman governors

== Sources ==
- Géza Alföldy, Konsulat und Senatorenstand unter der Antoninen, Bonn: Rudolf Habelt Verlag (1977)
- Barnes, T.D., "Proconsuls of Asia under Caracalla", Phoenix, 40 (1986), pp. 202–205
- Broughton, T. Robert S., The Magistrates of the Roman Republic, Vol II (1952)
- Eck, Werner, "Jahres- und Provinzialfasten der senatorischen Statthalter von 69/70 bis 138/139", Chiron, 12 (1982), pp. 281–362; 13 (1983), pp. 147–237.
- Filippini, A. “Su alcuni proconsoli d’Asia all’epoca di Marco Aurelio (168-173): Kaisergeschichte e Kirchengeschichte tra fonti letterarie ed epigrafiche”, in M.L. Caldelli - G.L. Gregori (a cura di), Epigrafia e ordine senatorio, 30 anni dopo (Tituli 10), Atti della XIXe Rencontre franco-italienne d’épigraphie du monde romain (Roma 21-23 marzo 2013), Roma 2014, pp. 745–776.
- Laale, Hans Willer, Ephesus (Ephesos): An Abbreviated History from Androclus to Constantine XI, WestBow Press (2011)
- Martindale, J. R.; Jones, A. H. M, The Prosopography of the Later Roman Empire, Vol. I AD 260–395, Cambridge University Press (1971)
- Martindale, J. R.; Jones, A. H. M, The Prosopography of the Later Roman Empire, Vol. II AD 395–527, Cambridge University Press (1980)
- Mennen, Inge, Power and Status in the Roman Empire, AD 193-284 (2011)
- Syme, Ronald, "The Proconsuls of Asia under Antoninus Pius", Zeitschrift für Papyrologie und Epigraphik, 51 (1983), pp. 271–290
- Syme, Ronald, The Augustan Aristocracy (1986) Clarendon Press.
