= List of Roman governors of Syria =

This is a list of governors of the Roman province of Syria. From 27 BC, the province was governed by an imperial legate of consular rank. The province was divided in AD 193 into Syria Coele and Syria Phoenicia. In c. 415 AD, Syria Coele was divided into Syria Prima and Syria Secunda. During the reign of Theodosius I (379 – 395), Syria Phoenicia was divided into Phoenicia Maritima and Phoenicia Libanensis.

== Proconsular governors of Syria (65–27 BC) ==
- 65–62: Marcus Aemilius Scaurus
- 61–60: Lucius Marcius Philippus
- 59–58: Gnaeus Cornelius Lentulus Marcellinus
- 57–54: Aulus Gabinius
- 54–53: Marcus Licinius Crassus
- 53–51: Gaius Cassius Longinus
- 51–50: Marcus Calpurnius Bibulus
- 50/49: Fabricius Veiento
- 49–48: Metellus Scipio
- 47–46: Sextus Julius Caesar
- 46–44: Quintus Caecilius Bassus
- 45: Gaius Antistius Vetus
- 44: Lucius Staius Murcus
- 44–43: Quintus Marcius Crispus
- 44–42: Gaius Cassius Longinus
- 41–40: Lucius Decidius Saxa
- 40–39: Parthian occupation
- 39–38: Publius Ventidius Bassus
- 38–37: Gaius Sosius
- 35: Lucius Munatius Plancus
- 34/33–33/32: Lucius Calpurnius Bibulus
- 30: Quintus Didius
- 29: Marcus Valerius Messalla Corvinus
- 28–25: Cicero Minor

== Propraetorial Imperial Legates of Roman Syria (27 BC to 193 AD) ==
Date	Governor
25 – 23 BC	Marcus Terentius Varro
23 – 13 BC	Marcus Vipsanius Agrippa
13/12 – 10/9 BC	Marcus Titius
9 – 7/6 BC	Gaius Sentius Saturninus
7/6 – 4 BC	Publius Quinctilius Varus
4 BC – 1 AD	Unknown, probably Lucius Calpurnius Piso (Note: This is based on the discovery of the Lapis Tiburtinus inscription. Piso was Proconsul of Asia, and received honors for defeating the Bessi. A minority theory posits that it was Publius Sulpicius Quirinius, who was in the region at the time, received honors for defeating the Homana and was the rector to Gaius Caesar. However, there is no evidence that he was ever Proconsul of Asia.)
1 AD – 4 AD	Gaius Julius Caesar Vipsanianus
4 – 5	Lucius Volusius Saturninus
6 – 12	Publius Sulpicius Quirinius
12 – 17	Quintus Caecilius Metellus Creticus Silanus
17 – 19	Gnaeus Calpurnius Piso
19 – 21	Gnaeus Sentius Saturninus
22 – 32	Lucius Aelius Lamia
32 – 35	Lucius Pomponius Flaccus
35 – 39	Lucius Vitellius
39 – 41/42	Publius Petronius
41/42 – 44/45	Gnaeus (Gaius?) Vibius Marsus
45 – 49	Cassius Longinus
50 – 60	Gaius Ummidius Durmius Quadratus
60 – 63	Gnaeus Domitius Corbulo
63 – 67	Cestius Gallus
67 – 69	Gaius Licinius Mucianus
70 – 72	Lucius Caesennius Paetus
72 – 73	Aulus Marius Celsus
73 – 78	Marcus Ulpius Traianus
78 – 82	Lucius Ceionius Commodus
82 – 84	Titus Atilius Rufus
87 – 90	Publius Valerius Patruinus
90 – 93	Aulus Bucius Lappius Maximus
93 – 96	Gaius Octavius Tidius Tossianus Lucius Javolenus Priscus
96 – 97	Marcus Cornelius Nigrinus Curiatius Maternus
97 – 100	Aulus Larcius Priscus
100 – 104	Gaius Antius Aulus Julius Quadratus
104 – 108	Aulus Cornelius Palma Frontonianus
108 – 112	Lucius Fabius Justus
114 – 115	Gaius Julius Quadratus Bassus
117	Publius Aelius Hadrianus
117 – ?120	Lucius Catilius Severus Julianus Claudius Reginus
125 – 128	Quintus Coredius Gallus Gargilius Antiquus
128 – ?136	Gaius Quinctius Certus Poblicius Marcellus
?136 – 137	Gaius Bruttius Praesens Lucius Fulvius Rusticus
137 – 140	Sextus Julius Major
140	Lucius Burbuleius Optatus Ligarianus
144	Lucius Sergius Paullus
147 – 150	Sulpicius Julianus
150 – 154	Marcus Pontius Laelianus Larcius Sabinus
154 – 157	Marcus Cassius Apollinaris
157 – 162	Lucius Attidius Cornelianus
163 – 164	Marcus Annius Libo
164 – 166	Gnaeus Julius Verus
166 – 175	Gaius Avidius Cassius
175 – 178	Publius Martius Verus
179 – 182	Publius Helvius Pertinax
183 – 185	Gaius Domitius Dexter
186 – 187	Gaius Julius Saturninus
187 – 190	Asellius Aemilianus
190 – 193	Gaius Pescennius Niger

== Propraetorial Imperial Legates of Syria Coele (193 AD to c. 295 AD) ==
Date	Governor
c. 207 – 209	Marius Maximus
c. 209 – 211	Minicius Martialis
c. 216	Aurelius Mam(---)
c. 221	Julius Antonius Seleucus
Between 225 and 235	Quintus Aradius Rufinus Optatus Aelianus
(?) 235	(? Claudius Sollemnius) Pacatianus
c. 241	Attius Rufinus
c. 241 – 249	Flavius Antiochus
c. 251	Atilius Cosminus
c. 251	Pomponius Laetianus
During the 260s	Virius Lupus
c. 275	Maximinus
c. 279	Julius Saturninus
Between 276 and 282	Claudius Cleobulus
Between 289 and 297	L. Aelius Helvius Dionysius
290	Charisius

== Propraetorial Imperial Legates of Syria Phoenicia (193 AD to c. 295 AD) ==
Date	Governor
193 – 194	Ti. Manilius Fuscus
198	Q. Venidius Rufus Marius Maximus L. Calvinianus
c. 207	Domitius Leo Procillianus
213	D. Pius Cassius
Between 268 and 270	Salvius Theodorus
Between 284 and 305	L. Artorius Pius Maximus
292 – 293	Crispinus

== Consularis Governors of Syria Coele (c. 295 AD to c. 415 AD) ==
Date	Governor
Between 293 and 305	Latinius Primosus
305	Verinus
? 323	Dyscolius
After 324	Arrius Maximus
Between 324 and 337	Plutarchus
Between 329 and 335	Fl. Dionysius
338	Nonnus
388	Eustathius
347	Theodorus
348	Fl. Antonius Hierocles
349	Anatolius
Before 353	Honoratus
354	Theophilus
355	Dionysius
355 – 356	Gymnasius
358	Nicentius
358 – 359	Sabinus
360	Tryphonianus
360	Italicianus
361	Siderius
363	Alexander
363 – 364	Celsus
364	Marcianus
Between 364 and 380	Protasius
Between 364 and 380	Protasius (Note: Successor to the previous Protasius)
Between 365 and 368	Festus
Between 365 and 371	Aetherius
Between 370 and 374	Fl. Eutolmius Tatianus
c. 379/80	Carterius
Before 381	Domnicus
c. 382	Marcellinus
c. 382/3	Pelagius
Between 382 and 393	Timocrates
c. 384/5	Eumolpius
386	Tisamenus
387	Celsus
388	Lucianus
388	Eustathius
389	Eutropius
c. 389/90	Palladius
390	Infantius
Before 392	Capitolinus
Before 392	Iullus
? 392/3	Florentius
Before 393/4	Severus

== Consularis Governors of Syria Phoenicia (c. 295 AD to c. 395 AD) ==
Date	Governor
Between 293 and 305	Aelius Statuus
Between 293 and 303	Sossianus Hierocles
Before 305	Julius Julianus
? Between 309/313	Maximus
c. 323	Achillius
328 – 329	Fl. Dionysius
335	Archelaus
c. 337	Nonnus
342	Marcellinus
353/4	Apollinaris
Before 358	Demetrius
358 – 359	Nicentius
(?) 359/60	Euchrostius
Before 360	Julianus
360 – 361	Andronicus
Before 361	Aelius Claudius Dulcitius
361	Anatolius
c. 361/2	Polycles
362	Julianus
362 – 363	Gaianus
363 – 364	Marius
364	Ulpianus
364 – 365	Domninus
372	Leontius
380	Petrus
382 – 383	Proculus
Before 388	Eustathius
388	Antherius
388	Epiphanius
390	Domitius
391	Severianus
392	Leontius

== See also ==
- Lists of ancient Roman governors

== Bibliography ==
- Dąbrowa, Edward, The Governors of Roman Syria from Augustus to Septimius Severus (1998)
- Schürer Emil, Vermes Geza, Millar Fergus, The history of the Jewish people in the age of Jesus Christ (175 B.C.-A.D. 135), Volume I, Edinburgh 1973, p. 243-266 (Survey of the Roman Province of Syria from 63 B.C. to A.D. 70).
- Linda Jones Hall, Roman Berytus: Beirut in late antiquity (2004)
- Martindale, John R.; Jones, A. H. M.; Morris, John, eds. (1971). The Prosopography of the Later Roman Empire: Volume I, AD 260–395. Cambridge: Cambridge University Press. ISBN 0-521-07233-6.
