= Norbanus =

Norbanus may refer to:

- Norbana gens, a family in ancient Rome
  - Gaius Norbanus (died 82 BC), Roman politician and consul
  - Gaius Norbanus Flaccus (consul 24 BC), son of the consul in 38 BC
  - Gaius Norbanus Flaccus (consul 38 BC), Roman politician and general
  - Gaius Norbanus Sorex, Roman actor during the rule of Augustus (63 BC–14 AD)
  - Lucius Norbanus Balbus, Roman senator, consul in 19 AD
- Titus Flavius Norbanus, Roman equites, governor of Raetia and Praetorian prefect during the reign of Domitian (51–96)
- Norbanus (wasp), a wasp genus in the subfamily Pteromalinae

== See also ==
- Aulus Bucius Lappius Maximus, 1st century Roman senator sometimes misidentified as Lucius Appius Maximus Norbanus
