= Publius Afranius Flavianus =

2nd century Roman senator and governor

Publius Afranius Flavianus was a Roman senator who held at least one office in the service of the emperor. It is believed Flavianus was suffect consul in one of the nundinia that fell in the last half of 117, based on a restoration of a military diploma dated 18 August; if this restoration is correct, then he was the colleague of Lucius Cossonius Gallus. Flavianus is known only through surviving inscriptions.

Flavianus was governor of the imperial province of Pannonia Inferior from 111 to 115; it is possible that he was the direct successor of Titus Julius Maximus Manlianus, believed to have been governor from the year 107 until 111. Since Flavianus governed an imperial province, one can reasonably expect that Flavianus was also a legatus legionis or commander of a legion prior to 111, since both offices were usually required for senators in the emperor's service to reach the consulate -- although there are exceptions to this practice. Nevertheless, evidence is lacking whether he had commanded one or not.

An inscription erected in Ephesus by the contemporary Asiarch attests that Flavianus was proconsular governor of Asia, the pinnacle of a successful senatorial career, for the term 130/131. There is no record of him after his governorship.

Political offices
| Preceded by Quintus Aquilius Niger, and Marcus Rebilus Apronianus as ordinary consuls | Suffect consul of the Roman Empire; AD 117 with Lucius Cossonius Gallus Vecillius Crispinus Mansuanius Marcellinus Numisius Sabinus | Succeeded by ignotus, and Gnaeus Minicius Faustinus as suffect consuls |
