= Tiberius Julius Candidus Marius Celsus =

1st century Roman senator, consul and governor

Tiberius Julius Candidus Marius Celsus was a Roman senator who lived during the Flavian dynasty. Contemporary sources, such as the Fasti Ostienses, the Acta Arvalia and a letter of Pliny the Younger (Ep. V.20.5), refer to him as Tiberius Julius Candidus. He was twice consul.

Ronald Syme argues that Candidus, although said to be from Narbonensis, was in fact from Asia Minor, and the "Tiberius Julius" portion of his name suggests that an ancestor acquired Roman citizenship between AD 4 and 37. "Thus a co-eval of Candidus: Ti. Julius Celsus Polemnus of Sardis, consul suffect in 92." The remainder of Candidus' name, "Marius Celsus", Syme explains as evidence that either he was born as Marius Celsus and adopted by a Julius Candidus, or born a Julius Candidus whose father married into the family of the Marii Celsi; Syme appears to favor the latter explanation. Olli Salomies sets forth the evidence in his monograph on Roman naming practices, but provides no interpretation beyond stating that "it is obvious that Iulius Candidus had something to do with A. Marius Celsus, cos. suff. in 69".

The first record of Candidus is as a member of the Arval Brethren, which he may have been made a member in AD 72, or as late as 75, and appears at each ceremony until 81. From his absence from the activities of the Arval Brethren starting in January and May 86, Syme speculates Candidus was in the company of the Emperor Domitian during his military campaigns. Later that year, in the nundinium of May-August he served as suffect consul as the colleague of Sextus Octavius Fronto. Three years later, Candidus was selected to be governor of the important province of Cappadocia-Galatia and completed his term in 92. More recently Peter Weiß has published a military diploma which attests to Candidus' appointment as governor of an undetermined province (most likely one of the Germanies or Dacias) at some point between July 96 and the beginning of January 97. He was appointed consul a second time in 105, as ordinary consul with Gaius Antius Aulus Julius Quadratus, who also enjoyed a second consulship.

Candidus lived many years after his second consulship. He is mentioned as present in the Acta Arvalia in AD 110 and 111; another inscription attests he was a flamen for the Brethren in 118.

== Family ==
According to Syme, Candidus married the daughter of a Caecilius Simplex and they had at least three sons together:

- Tiberius Julius Candidus Caecilius Simplex, co-opted into the Arval Brethren by 105. Syme surmises Caecilius Simplex died before he could achieve the consulate, but attributes to him a son of the same name, who was governor of Achaea in 136/137.
- Tiberius Julius Candidus Capito, suffect consul in 122.
- Tiberius Julius Candidus Celsus, attested as proconsular governor of Asia in 143/144.

Political offices
Preceded by ignotus, and Quintus Vibius Secundus as Suffect consuls	Suffect consul of the Roman Empire; 86 with Sextus Octavius Fronto	Succeeded by Aulus Bucius Lappius Maximus, and Gaius Octavius Tidius Tossianus Lucius Javolenus Priscus as Suffect consuls
Preceded by Sextus Attius Suburanus Aemilianus II, and Marcus Asinius Marcellus as Ordinary consuls	Consul of the Roman Empire; 105 with Gaius Antius Aulus Julius Quadratus II	Succeeded by Gaius Julius Quadratus Bassus, and Gnaeus Afranius Dexter as Suffect consuls
