= Lucius Cossonius Gallus =

- Born: Lucius Cossonius Gallus Vecillius Crispinus Mansuanius Marcellinus Numisius Sabinus
- Occupation: Roman senator
- Known for: Held many offices in the imperial service

Lucius Cossonius Gallus was a Roman senator, who held a number of offices in the imperial service. He was suffect consul in one of the nundinia that fell in the last half of AD 117 as the colleague of Publius Afranius Flavianus. His full name is Lucius Cossonius Gallus Vecillius Crispinus Mansuanius Marcellinus Numisius Sabinus. He is known entirely from inscriptions.

== Career ==
An inscription set up at Antioch of Pisidia has been assumed to refer to Gallus, although the name is incomplete: "[...]nius Gallus Vecillius Crispinus Mansuanius Marcellinus Numisius Sabinus". Some authorities, such as Ronald Syme, argue that this inscription refers to Gallus; however, others such as L. Petersen and Hans-Georg Pflaum, have denied this identification. If we agree that this inscription does refer to Cossonius Gallus, his first known office was as a military tribune with the Legio XXI Rapax. This legion disappeared in the 90s: one theory is that it was disbanded as a result of its participation in the revolt of Lucius Antonius Saturninus in January 89; another theory holds that it was destroyed during Domitian's campaign against the Sarmatians in the 90s; a third theory is that the legion mutinied at the time of the uprising of the Praetorians against Nerva in the year 97, and was disbanded afterwards. Bernard Rémy prefers the first possibility, that the legion had dishonored itself, noting that the name of the legion has been excised from several inscriptions at Vindonissa, a common indication of damnatio memoriae.

Following his military commission, Gallus then was appointed one of the tresviri capitalis, one of the four boards that form the vigintiviri; membership in one of these four boards was a preliminary and required first step toward gaining entry into the Roman Senate. This particular board, which supervised prisons and the execution of criminals, was the least prestigious of the vigintiviri. Since he is one of the few senators of that time to have fulfilled his military duties before entering the vigintiviri, Rémy suggests Gallus might have been commissioned an angusticlave tribune and received the laticlave soon after. His next post, as legate to the proconsular governor of Asia, supports this hypothesis; in any case it demonstrates that Gallus had powerful mentors assisting his career, for only five other examples are known of men serving as legates to proconsuls prior to holding the office of quaestor, which he served in the public province of Bithynia and Pontus. The traditional Republican magistracies of plebeian tribune and praetor followed.

Once he completed his term as praetor, Gallus was appointed to a series of imperial posts. First was curator of a network of Etruscan roads, which comprised the Trajanae novae: the Viae Clodia, Cassia, Annia, and the Ciminia. This was followed by an appointment as praefectus frumenti dandi (the prefect responsible for the distribution of Rome's free grain dole). Then Gallus was commissioned as legatus legionis or commander of two Roman legions. The first was Legio I Italica, stationed at Novae on the Danube in the imperial province of Moesia Inferior. Next was Legio II Traiana Fortis, which was raised in the year 105 on the eve of Trajan's Dacian Wars. Senators rarely commanded more than one legion in their career; in compiling a list of all men known to have commanded two or more, Anthony Birley identified only thirty-three men. After completing his military service, the sortition awarded Gallus the province of Corsica and Sardinia; although Rémy dates his tenure in that province to either 114/115 or 115/116, Werner Eck dates it to the period 112/113. Upon returning to Rome, Gallus was admitted to the septemviri epulonum, one of the four most prestigious ancient Roman priesthoods; he was also admitted to the sodales Flaviales, which at the time was still an important honor. Following this he was appointed governor to the imperial province of Galatia. It is clear Gallus followed Lucius Caesennius Sospes in this office, and thus held this office after the year 114, yet before he acceded to the consulate; Rémy suggests he was governor from 117 to 119, while Eck proposes from 116 to 119.

Gallus' life after he stepped down from the consulate was long considered a blank until the discovery in 2003 of a statue base at Caesarea Maritima that attests that he was governor of Judea, an office reserved for senators of the consular rank. His presence in Judea is noteworthy, for he would have reunited with his old unit, Legio II Traiana Fortis, which had been stationed in that province in the year 117.

Political offices
Preceded by Quintus Aquilius Niger, and Marcus Rebilus Apronianus as ordinary consuls	Suffect consul of the Roman Empire; 117 with Publius Afranius Flavianus	Succeeded by ignotus, and Gnaeus Minicius Faustinus as suffect consuls
