= Norbana gens =

Ancient Roman family

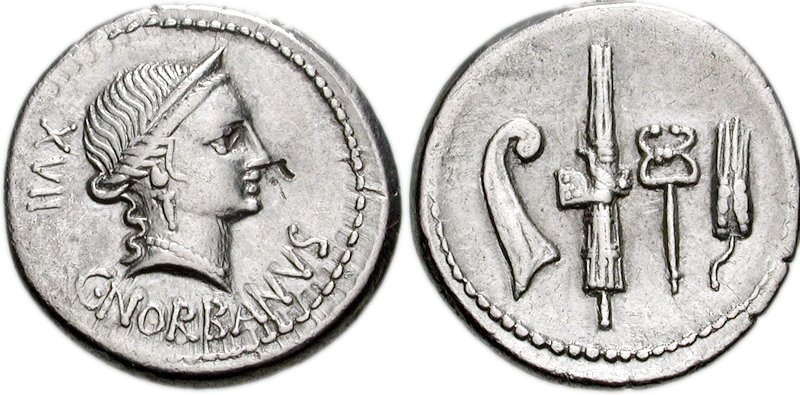
Denarius of Gaius Norbanus, 83 BC. The obverse depicts Venus, while the reverse features a prow-stem, fasces, caduceus, and an ear of wheat, an allusion to his father raising the siege of Rhegium during the Social War.

The gens Norbana was a plebeian family at ancient Rome. Members of this gens are first mentioned toward the beginning of the first century BC, and from then to the end of the second century AD they filled a number of magistracies and other important posts, first in the late Republic, and subsequently under the emperors.

== Origin ==
Because the great majority of Roman gentilicia end in -ius, many writers have supposed Norbanus to have been a cognomen, perhaps belonging to a branch of the Junia gens. In fact, it is itself a nomen gentilicium, belonging to a class of nomina derived from place-names, and ending in -anus. Such names were common in families of Umbrian origin, although less characteristic of Latin gentes. In the case of the Norbani, the name is likely derived from the town of Norba, in Latium, but, since none of the known members of the gens show any association with the town, it was perhaps an earlier, unknown ancestor who came from there, suggesting the family is of greater antiquity than the available records suggest. For the first Norbani appearing in the late Republic, Ronald Syme suggested an Etruscan origin.

== Branches and cognomina ==
The primary surname of the Norbani is Flaccus, a common surname that translates as "flabby" or "flap-eared". Other surnames include Balbus, a common name referring to one who stammers; this is also written as Bulbus, perhaps with an intentional change of meaning, since bulbus refers to an onion.

== Members ==
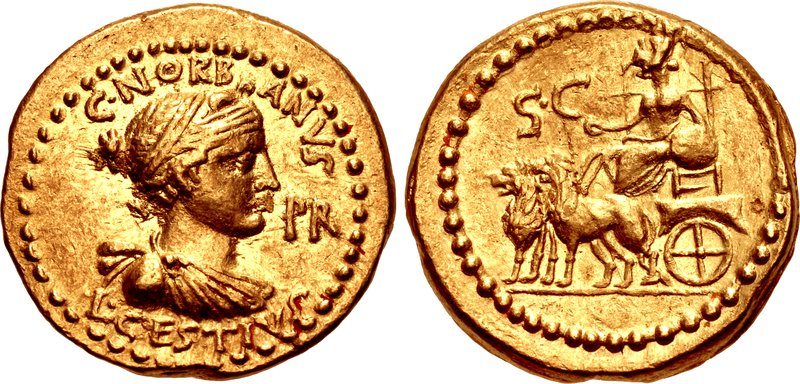
Aureus of Gaius Norbanus and Lucius Cestius, 43 BC. On the obverse is a bust of the Cumaean Sibyl, while on the reverse Cybele drives a biga pulled by lions, perhaps alluding to Octavian's anticipated victory over Brutus and Cassius.

This list includes abbreviated praenomina. For an explanation of this practice, see filiation.

=== Norbani Flacci ===
- Gaius Norbanus, consul in 83 BC, during the civil war between Sulla and the followers of Marius. He met Sulla in battle near Capua, and was badly defeated. After a second defeat in 82, when Norbanus was proconsul, he fled to Rhodes, but upon learning that Sulla had demanded he be turned over to him, he took his own life.
- Gaius Norbanus C. f., triumvir monetalis in 83 BC, the same year as his father as consul. (Note: Crawford and T. P. Wiseman assumed he was the same as the consul of 38 BC, but Richard Evans showed he would have been too old by this date.)
- Gaius Norbanus C. f. C. n. Flaccus, one of the generals under Octavian and Marcus Antonius in 42 BC, he detected a ruse on the part of Brutus and Cassius, and defended his position, setting the stage for the victory of the triumvirs at the Battle of Philippi. Flaccus was praetor in 43 and consul in 38. He minted aurei during his praetorship.
- Gaius Norbanus C. f. C. n. Flaccus, consul in 24 BC, with the emperor Augustus, and afterward governor of Asia.
- Gaius Norbanus C. f. C. n. Flaccus, consul in AD 15.
- Lucius Norbanus C. f. C. n. Balbus Flaccus, consul in AD 19.

=== Other Norbani ===
- Norbana, the wife of Carus, a friend of Martial.
- Gaius Norbanus Sorex, an actor active at Pompeii and Nemi during the time of Augustus.
- Norbanus Licinianus, one of Domitian's unsavoury minions, was banished during the reign of Trajan.
- Lucius Appius Maximus Norbanus, an accomplished general under Domitian and Trajan. He put down the revolt of Lucius Antonius Saturninus in Germania Superior, AD 91. He was consul in 103. Although he enjoyed success in the Dacian War, he was defeated and killed in the Parthian War, AD 115.
- Titus Flavius Norbanus, praetorian prefect under the emperor Domitian, whose death he witnessed.
- Norbanus, banished by the emperor Commodus.
- Norbana, banished by Commodus.

== See also ==
- List of Roman gentes

== Bibliography ==
- Diodorus Siculus, Bibliotheca Historica (Library of History).
- Titus Livius (Livy), Ab Urbe Condita (History of Rome).
- Dionysius of Halicarnassus, Romaike Archaiologia.
- Marcus Velleius Paterculus, Compendium of Roman History.
- Marcus Valerius Martialis (Martial), Epigrammata (Epigrams).
- Gaius Plinius Caecilius Secundus (Pliny the Younger), Epistulae (Letters).
- Plutarchus, Lives of the Noble Greeks and Romans.
- Publius Cornelius Tacitus, Annales.
- Gaius Suetonius Tranquillus, De Vita Caesarum (Lives of the Caesars, or The Twelve Caesars).
- Lucius Annaeus Florus, Epitome de T. Livio Bellorum Omnium Annorum DCC (Epitome of Livy: All the Wars of Seven Hundred Years).
- Appianus Alexandrinus (Appian), Bellum Civile (The Civil War).
- Lucius Cassius Dio Cocceianus (Cassius Dio), Roman History.
- Aelius Lampridius, Aelius Spartianus, Flavius Vopiscus, Julius Capitolinus, Trebellius Pollio, and Vulcatius Gallicanus, Historia Augusta (Augustan History).
- Sextus Aurelius Victor (attributed), Epitome de Caesaribus.
- Paulus Orosius, Historiarum Adversum Paganos (History Against the Pagans).
- Dictionary of Greek and Roman Biography and Mythology, William Smith, ed., Little, Brown and Company, Boston (1849).
- George Davis Chase, "The Origin of Roman Praenomina", in Harvard Studies in Classical Philology, vol. VIII (1897).
- Paul von Rohden, Elimar Klebs, & Hermann Dessau, Prosopographia Imperii Romani (The Prosopography of the Roman Empire, abbreviated PIR), Berlin (1898).
- Schulze, Wilhelm, Zur Geschichte lateinischer Eigennamen, in «Abhandlungen der Königlichen Gesellschaft der Wissenschaften zu Göttingen, Philologisch-Historische Klasse», new series, vol. V, no. 5, Berlin: Weidmannsche Buchhandlung (1933), ISSN 0931-2013.
- Ronald Syme, The Roman Revolution, Oxford (1939).
- T. Robert S. Broughton, The Magistrates of the Roman Republic, American Philological Association (1952).
- Michael Crawford and T. P. Wiseman, "The Coinage of the Age of Sulla", in The Numismatic Chronicle, Seventh Series, Vol. 4 (1964), pp. 141–158.
- Michael Crawford, Roman Republican Coinage, Cambridge University Press (1974, 2001).
- John C. Traupman, The New College Latin & English Dictionary, Bantam Books, New York (1995).
- Richard J. Evans, "Norbani Flacci: The Consuls of 38 and 24 B.C.", in Historia: Zeitschrift für Alte Geschichte, volume 36, part 1, pp. 121–128 (1987).
- James L. Franklin, Jr., "Pantomimists at Pompeii: Actius Anicetus and His Troupe", in The American Journal of Philology, vol. 108, No. 1, pp. 95–107 (1987).
- Taylor, Lily Ross, The Voting Districts of the Roman Republic: The Thirty-five Urban and Rural Tribes, ed. Jerzy Linderski, Ann Arbor: University of Michigan Press (2013, 1960), ISBN 978-0-472-11869-4.
