= Sextus Subrius Dexter Cornelius Priscus =

Roman suffect consul around 104 AD

Sextus Subrius Dexter Cornelius Priscus (Note: In his I fasti consolari dell'Impero Romano dal 30 avanti Cristo al 613 dopo Cristo (Rome, 1952), Attilio Degrassi had reconstructed his name as (Lucius ?) Cornelius Priscus, which was followed by other experts such as Ronald Syme (Tacitus [Oxford: Clarendon Press, 1958], p. 665) and E. Mary Smallwood (Documents Illustrating the Principates of Nerva, Trajan and Hadrian [Cambridge: University Press, 1966], p. 12). Subsequently the two inscriptions mentioned below were shown to apply to this senator, and this older reading rejected.) was a Roman senator who held several imperial appointments during the reign of Trajan. He is best known for being an acquaintance of Pliny the Younger. Around the year 104 Cornelius Priscus was suffect consul for an as yet undetermined nundinium.

The full name of Cornelius Priscus has been reconstructed from two incomplete inscriptions, one found at Patavium, the other at Forum Fulvii: [C. ? Asconius] C.f. Fab. Sa[rdus Po]mponianus Secundus P. Cestius Sex. Subrius Dexter Cornelius Priscus Ducenius Proculus. The elements in this example of polyonomy invite speculation. Most obvious is the pair "Ducenius Proculus", which, combined with his connection to Patavium, suggests a connection to the other Ducenii in that city, such as Aulus Ducenius Geminus, suffect consul in either 60 or 61.

While the inscription from Forum Fulvi lists three of the appointments Cornelius Priscus received, in reverse chronological order, it raises more questions than answers. These are: military tribune of Legio XXI Rapax, sevir equitum Romanorum turmae VI, and legatus legionis of an unknown legion while Trajan was emperor; the traditional Republican magistracy of praetor does not appear in the surviving text. The XXI Rapax was involved in the rebellion of Lucius Antonius Saturninus in 89, then was destroyed in 92, while fighting on the Lower Danube against the Sarmatians; Cornelius Priscus had to have held his commission either before the revolt, or less likely about the time of its defeat, but definitely before 92. On the other hand, he could not have commanded the full legion before Trajan assumed the purple, which was in 98. Either Cornelius Priscus had a lengthy wait between his praetorship (which he would have reached no earlier than 93); or he was rehabilitated after the loss of the legion to which he was attached in 92, in order for Trajan to give him command of a legion.

One office after his consulship is known for him, proconsular governor of Asia in 120/121. One record of his activities as governor has come down to us, preserved in an inscription at Ephesus: a letter from emperor Hadrian to the Gerusia of Ephesus confirms the decision of Priscus' predecessor, Gaius Trebonius Proculus Mettius Modestus, while instructing Priscus to "this sort he may select someone cases and may collect all the sums owed to the Gerusia."

Cornelius Priscus was the recipient of one of Pliny's letters, and the subject of a second. The letter he received concerned the death of the poet Martial (III.21). In the other letter, Pliny mentions Priscus' presence at the lawsuit between a delegation from the province of Bithynia and Pontus and Varenus Rufus, who had been their proconsular governor in 105/106 (V.20.7). Priscus made the motion, that was approved by the Senate, to investigate both the accusations of the Bithynians, and of the counter-claims Rufus had made.
