= Marcus Maecius Celer =

Marcus Maecius Celer was a Roman senator, who was active during the reign of Trajan. He was suffect consul in the nundinium of April-May 101 as the colleague of Gaius Sertorius Brocchus Quintus Servaeus Innocens. He is known almost solely from inscriptions.

The origins of Maecius Celer have attracted some discussion. The fact that the final elements of our man's name are shared with the suffect consul of 100, Lucius Roscius Aelianus Maecius Celer, have led some experts to suggest the two men are brothers. However Olli Salomies endorses Ronald Syme's hypothesis that his filiation M.f. refers to a Marcus Roscius, namely Marcus Roscius Coelius, consul in 81, who married an aunt of the consul of 101, and this was the source of the last two name elements; instead of brothers, the two Maecii Celeres are cousins.

It is thought that Maecius Celer's place of origin was in Hispania Tarraconensis. Not counting his consulate, only one office of Celer's cursus honorum is known. In the last years of the reign of emperor Domitian, Statius writes a poem saluting Celer's departure to command a legion in Syria.

Political offices
| Preceded by Sextus Attius Suburanus Aemilianus, and Quintus Articuleius Paetus II | Suffect consul of the Roman Empire; 101 with Gaius Sertorius Brocchus Quintus Servaeus Innocens | Succeeded by [...]us Proculus, and ignotus as suffect consuls |
