= Sextus Attius Suburanus =

Roman eques

Sextus Attius Suburanus Aemilianus
- Military career
- Allegiance: Roman Empire
- Service years: 98–101
- Rank: Praetorian prefect
- Unit: Praetorian Guard--German Guard
- Commands: Praetorian Guard
- Other work: Consul of the Roman Empire in 104

Sextus Attius Suburanus Aemilianus, commonly abbreviated as Suburanus, was a Roman eques who helped Trajan consolidate his position as emperor. Originally procurator of Gallia Belgica, Suburanus was appointed prefect of the Roman imperial bodyguard, known as the Praetorian Guard, in the year 98 and brought this important military unit under Trajan's control. For his achievement, at the end of his command of the Guard, Suburanus was adlected into the Roman Senate inter praetores, then held the suffect consulship as the colleague of the consul posterior Quintus Articuleius Paetus in AD 101.

Upon giving Suburanus the sword that the commander of the Praetorian Guard was expected to wear at all times, Trajan first unsheathed it and handing it to him uttered, "If I rule well, use this sword for me. If I rule badly, use it against me."

== Career ==
His cursus honorum as an eques is partially known from an inscription set up at Baalbek in Syria (modern Lebanon). The earliest office Subaranus is known to have held was prefectus fabrum. Next he was prefectus of the ala Taurina, a cohort of auxiliary cavalry; Tacitus mentions this unit as present at Lugudunum with the Legio I Italica in early spring AD 69. Ronald Syme infers from this, and that Suburanus belonged to the Roman tribe "Voltinia", that he was "one of the Narbonensian notables who came out on the side of the pretender Sulpicius Galba."

Over the decades following the Year of Four Emperors Suburanus held a number of offices in service to the Flavian emperors. He was twice adiutor to men of high rank and influence. The first was Lucius Junius Quintus Vibius Crispus, whom he assisted with the census in Hispania Tarraconensis during the latter's governorship in 74–79. The second was Lucius Julius Ursus, who was praefectus annonae and later Prefect of Egypt. Then Suburanus was prefectus ad Mercurium. Next, he was governor of a number of minor provinces: Alpes Cottiae, Pedatius Tyrius, Gammuntius, and Lepontius. He then served as procurator in Judea, and again in Gallia Belgica in the year 97, when Trajan was appointed heir to Nerva. The last was a vitally important office, for this procurator handled the finances for the legions on the Rhine frontier, one of the largest groups of soldiers in the Roman Empire. There he proved his loyalty to Trajan; as a consequence, Trajan appointed him commander of the Praetorian Guard.

His predecessor, Casperius Aelianus, had been responsible for an insurrection against the previous emperor Nerva; following emperor Nerva's death, Casperius and others involved in the mutiny were summoned before Trajan at his headquarters in Colonia Agrippina under false pretenses where, in the words of Cassius Dio, Trajan "put them out of the way". In the opinion of the historian John D. Grainger, the manner in which Casperius was dispatched left the rest of the men in the Praetorian Guard "surely very resentful at the execution of their officers and colleagues and at the deceitful way it had been accomplished." It was up to Suburanus to take control of these men, and rebuild their confidence in Trajan while weeding out those whom he could not trust. Meanwhile, Trajan remained on the Rhine frontier until Suburanus completed his work.

Syme notes, "When Pliny delivered his oration in September of the year 100, Suburanus was perhaps already a senator and designated for the consulship." Syme further notes that Suburanus was admitted to the College of Pontifices, which "advertised his rank." He enjoyed the signal honor of a second consulship, as consul ordinarius in 104 with Marcus Asinius Marcellus as his colleague. Pliny alludes to Suburanus twice in his letters, attesting that he was alive as late as the year 107.

Political offices
Preceded by Trajan IV, and Quintus Articuleius Paetus as Ordinary consuls	Suffect consul of the Roman Empire; AD 101 with Quintus Articuleius Paetus	Succeeded by Gaius Sertorius Brocchus Quintus Servaeus Innocens, and Marcus Maecius Celer as Suffect consuls
Preceded by (A?)nnius Mela, and Publius Calpurnius Macer Caulius Rufus as Suffect consuls	Consul of the Roman Empire; AD 104 with Marcus Asinius Marcellus	Succeeded by Tiberius Julius Candidus Marius Celsus, and Gaius Antius Aulus Julius Quadratus II as Ordinary consuls
