= Bucia gens =

Ancient Roman family

The gens Bucia was an obscure plebeian family of ancient Rome. The only member of this gens to achieve prominence was Aulus Bucius Lappius Maximus, who held the consulship twice under the emperor Domitian. Several others are known from inscriptions.

== Members ==
This list includes abbreviated praenomina. For an explanation of this practice, see filiation.

- Aulus Bucius Lappius Maximus, (Note: Found in older sources as Lucius Appius Maximus Norbanus, evidently mistaking Lappius for L. Appius, and combining a partial name from a corrupt manuscript with that of Titus Flavius Norbanus, governor of Raetia during the same period.) consul from September to December in AD 86, and a second time from May to August 95. He was governor of Bithynia and Pontus, Germania Inferior, and Syria.
- Lucius Bucius Proculus, duumvir at Ostia in Latium in AD 32. Publius Manlius Bassus was his colleague.
- Bucia, buried in a second-century tomb at Gens Bacchuiana in Africa, aged twenty-seven years, nine months, along with her mother, Aeburia Matidia Victoris.
- Aulus Bucius Aptus, dedicated a second-century tomb at Rome for his verna, or home-born slave Selene, aged four years, three months, and fifteen days.
- Bucia Tyche, buried at Rome, in a tomb built by her husband, Lucius Paccius Amarantus, ostensibly dating between the second half of the second century, and the early part of the third. The inscription is thought to be modern.

=== Undated Bucii ===
- Lucius Bucius Antiochus, named in an inscription from Ostia, along with Gaius Pomentinus Felix and the freedwoman Julia Apollonia.
- Bucia Calvina, dedicated a tomb at Salernum in Campania for her husband, Servius Julius Vitellius, a cornicularius, or bugler, in the Legio VII Claudia, aged sixty-seven years, eleven months, and eleven days. The inscription is thought to be modern.
- Publius Bucius Celer, buried at Utica in Africa, aged seventy-one years, six months, and twenty-two days.
- Bucia C. f. Extricata, buried at Uchi Maius in Africa, aged seventy-five.
- Bucia Saturnina, dedicated a tomb at Lambaesis in Numidia for her husband, Quintus Sabinius Ingenuus, aged seventy-five.
- Marcus Bucius Victor Silicianus, built a tomb at Avedda in Africa for his wife, Albia Aurelia Fortunata, aged twenty-four.

== See also ==
- List of Roman gentes

== Bibliography ==
=== Ancient sources ===
- Gaius Plinius Caecilius Secundus (Pliny the Younger), Epistulae (Letters).
- Sextus Aurelius Victor (attributed), Epitome de Caesaribus.

=== Modern sources ===
- Antiquités Africaines, CNRS Éditions, Paris (1967–present).
- Bulletin Archéologique du Comité des Travaux Historiques et Scientifiques (Archaeological Bulletin of the Committee on Historic and Scientific Works, abbreviated BCTH), Imprimerie Nationale, Paris (1885–1973).
- René Cagnat et alii, L'Année épigraphique (The Year in Epigraphy, abbreviated AE), Presses Universitaires de France (1888–present).
- Werner Eck, "Jahres- und Provinzialfasten der senatorischen Statthalter von 69/70 bis 138/139" (Annual and Provincial Fasti of the Senatorial Goverors from AD 69/70 to 138/139), in Chiron, vol. 12 (1982).
- Paul A. Gallivan, "The Fasti for A.D. 70–96", in Classical Quarterly, vol. 31, pp. 186–220 (1981).
- Alfred Merlin, Inscriptions Latines de La Tunisie (Latin Inscriptions from Tunisia), Fondation Dourlans, Paris (1944).
- Theodor Mommsen et alii, Corpus Inscriptionum Latinarum (The Body of Latin Inscriptions, abbreviated CIL), Berlin-Brandenburgische Akademie der Wissenschaften (1853–present).
- Bengt E. Thomasson, "Iscrizioni del Sepolcreto di via Ostiense" (Inscriptions from Selpulchres of the Via Ostiensis), in Opuscula Romana, vol. I (1954), pp. 125–145.
- Gustav Wilmanns, Inscriptiones Africae Latinae (Latin Inscriptions from Africa), Georg Reimer, Berlin (1881).
