= Sextus Octavius Fronto =

1st century Roman senator, military commander and consul

Sextus Octavius Fronto was a Roman senator and a military figure, who held a number of offices in the emperor's service. He was suffect consul in the nundinium of May to August 86 with Tiberius Julius Candidus Marius Celsus as his colleague. Martial addressed one of his epigrams to Fronto, wherein he describes Fronto as "an ornament of military and civil life".

Fronto may be descended from Octavius Fronto, a Senator of praetorian rank who was active between AD 11 and 19.

Only fragments of the cursus honorum of Fronto are known. For the praetorian portion of his career, he is known to have been legatus legionis or commander of Legio I Adiutrix, while for the consular portion Fronto is known to have been governor of Lower Moesia; Werner Eck dates his tenure from the years 89 to 93.

Political offices
Preceded by ignotus, and Quintus Vibius Secundus as suffect consuls	Suffect consul of the Roman Empire; 86 with Tiberius Julius Candidus Marius Celsus	Succeeded by Aulus Bucius Lappius Maximus, and Gaius Octavius Tidius Tossianus Lucius Javolenus Priscus as suffect consuls
