= Tiberius Julius Candidus Celsus =

Tiberius Julius Candidus Celsus was a Roman senator, who was active during the reign of the emperors Hadrian and Antoninus Pius. Coins of the town of Harpasa bear the image of the young Marcus Aurelius on the obverse, and the name "Candidus Celsus" on the reverse, attesting that Celsus was proconsular governor of the public province of Asia in the reign of Marcus. Ronald Syme dated his tenure as governor more narrowly to AD 144/145, which would date his suffect consulate to a nundinium around the year 129.

Syme's investigation of Candidus Celsus led him to surmise that the proconsul was likely the same man as a Tiberius Julius Candidus, attested as praetor on 8 June AD 121. Syme argued "easy and harmless conjecture" would allow this praetor to be identified as the youngest son of Tiberius Julius Candidus Marius Celsus consul II 105, who was "perhaps a decade younger" than his two brothers, Tiberius Julius Candidus Caecilius Simplex and Tiberius Julius Candidus Capito, suffect consul in 122. Based on these facts, and the possibility Celsus was the "Julius Candidus" who received a rescript from Antoninus Pius, Syme suggested Celsus was suffect consul in the year 129.
