= Quintus Vibius Secundus =

Roman senator and suffect consul in 86 AD

Quintus Vibius Secundus was a Roman Senator who was active during the reigns of Domitian and Trajan. He was suffect consul for the nundinium of March to April 86.

A member of the gens Vibia, Secundus is considered to be the son of the influential Politician Lucius Junius Quintus Vibius Crispus. There is a possibility that Secundus could be related to suffect consul Lucius Vibius Sabinus, father of the Empress Vibia Sabina.

Only one office is known for Secundus: in 101/102 the sortition selected him as proconsular governor of Asia.

Political offices
Preceded by Gaius Secius Campanus, and Servius Cornelius Dolabella Petronianus	Consul of the Roman Empire; 86 with Gaius Secius Campanus or Sextus Octavius Fronto	Succeeded by Sextus Octavius Fronto, and Tiberius Julius Candidus Marius Celsus
