= Julianus (consul) =

Julianus is the cognomen of a Roman senator whose tenure as suffect consul with one Castus as his colleague, is known from a number of brick stamps. A number of experts have surmised he is to be identified with a proconsul of Asia mentioned in the writings of the sophist Aelius Aristides.

In 1944, Herbert Bloch noted that bricks produced in Rome between AD 110 and 164 often bore a stamp with the year they were produced in, dated according to the eponymous or ordinary consul of the year, with the exception of four groups of bricks which were dated by the suffect consuls in office for part of that year. Of these four pairs of suffect consuls, he was able to identify and date the tenures of all of them except for the pair Julianus and Castus. This pair he could state that, based on the form of the stamp, probably held office in a nundinium in the period 127-134 Several more examples of bricks stamped with the cognomina of these consuls have since been found.

This Julianus is frequently identified with the proconsul Julianus mentioned in the Fourth Sacred Discourse of Aristides. Further, an inscription from Ephesus, datable to 145, mentions a proconsul [...]lianus, who has been identified with Aristides' Julianus. Consuls whom the sortition selected for this proconsulate held it in order of their consulate, after a period of 15 years, which would fit a consulate c. 130.

Further identification of this Julianus is less certain; two possible candidates have been offered. One is Tiberius Claudius Julianus, the grandnephew of Tiberius Julius Celsus Polemaeanus suffect consul in 92; this Julianus' son was Tiberius Claudius Julianus, consul in 154. The other is Tiberius Julius Julianus, sometimes identified with Tiberius Julius Julianus Alexander, governor of Arabia Petraea in 125.
