= Pompeius Paullinus =

1st century AD Roman senator and governor of Germania Inferior

Pompeius Paullinus was a Roman senator, who was active during the reigns of Claudius and Nero. He was suffect consul during a nundinium in either the year 53 or 54. According to Pliny the Elder, Paullinus was the son of Pompeius Paulinus, an eques from Arelate. He may have been the brother of Pompeia Paulina who was the wife of the philosopher and statesman Seneca.

Paullinus is best known for his tenure as governor of Germania Inferior, which has been attested by a mention in Tacitus, Pliny the Elder, and an inscription recovered from Cologne which has been dated to the year 56. The evidence points to his tenure as extending from 55 to 57; he was succeeded by Lucius Duvius Avitus in the year 58. Ronald Syme surmises that while Paullinus was governor of Germania Inferior, Pliny and the future emperor Titus both served as military tribunes. From his time in that province Pliny later recalled that Paullinus brought with him 12,000 pounds of silver plate to a posting where he was "confronted by tribes of the greatest ferocity."

After Paullinus returned from Germania, he is next attested in an inscription from Ephesus which documents three commissioners appointed to attend to some matter there, along with Lucius Calpurnius Piso (suffect consul in 57) and Aulus Ducenius Geminus (suffect consul in either 60 or 61); this may be the same commission created in 62 that Tacitus mentions. His life after this is a blank. Paullinus is not mentioned as one of the people executed or exiled as a result of the Pisonian conspiracy, nor as playing a role in the Year of Four Emperors.
