= Lucius Antonius Albus (proconsul of Asia) =

2nd century Roman senator and suffet consul

Lucius Antonius Albus was a Roman senator of the 2nd century AD who occupied a number of offices in the imperial service, as well as serving as suffect consul c. 132. Albus is best known for his tenure as proconsular governor of Asia, when, according to Aelius Aristides, a series of earthquakes struck western Asia Minor.

Albus has been identified as the son of the homonymous consul of 102, and Laevia Paulla; his great-grandfather was a priest of Artemis in Ephesus.

== Life ==
His cursus honorum up to just before his consulate can be recovered from a Latin inscription found at Corinth. Albus began in his teens as one of the tresviri monetalis, the most prestigious of the four boards that make up the vigintiviri; assignment to this board was usually allocated to patricians or favored individuals. Next he was commissioned a military tribune with Legio I Minervia, which at the time was stationed at Bonna (modern Bonn), in the province of Germania Inferior. Next came his admission to the Arval Brethren, a priesthood that the emperor Augustus revived over a century before. Albus was favored in his advancement through the traditional Republican magistracies, being selected as the emperor Trajan's candidate for quaestor, followed by becoming the emperor Hadrian's candidate for plebeian tribune; once elected quaestor, he was also formally enrolled into the Roman senate. Albus then advanced to praetor, which professor Géza Alföldy dates to the year 121. Once he had discharged his duties as praetor, Albus then was appointed legatus proconsulis or assistant to the proconsular governor of either Asia or Africa; served as curator of several of the roads; and spent a year as governor of the public province of Achaea, which Werner Eck dates to the term 127/128. Upon completing his governorship, Albus returned to Rome, for the records of the Arval Brethren show he was twice magister or head of the order. His suffect consulate followed.

Two events mark his tenure as governor of Asia. One is the dedication of a gymnasium in Ephesus by a leading citizen of that city, Publius Vedius Antoninus. The second is a series of earthquakes that wreaked destruction in Mytilene, Ephesus, and Smyrna; Aristides claims to have ended these earthquakes with the sacrifice of an ox, thus gaining great fame. However, the year Albus was governor is disputed. One school of thought, championed by G.W. Bowersock, holds Albus was governor in the year 160/161. Bowersock identifies the earthquake Aristides alludes to as the one of 161 by identifying the Asiarch in office during Albus' tenure, Tiberius Claudius Polydeucus Marcellus, with another one mentioned in an inscription from Magnesia on the Maeander which can be dated between 10 December 161 and 9 December 162. Bowersock also provides further evidence that Vedius Antoninus was active in the early 160s.

The other school of opinion, championed by Eck, Alföldy, and Ronald Syme, argues that Aristides' earthquake happened earlier, between 147 and 149. Syme notes that Publius Mummius Sisenna Rutilianus, suffect consul in 146, better fits the years 160/161, and Bowersock's choice as governor in 146/147, Atilius Maximus, is a ghost, providing room for Albus to be dated earlier.
