= Quintus Coredius Gallus Gargilius Antiquus =

2nd century Roman senator and consul

Marcus Paccius Silvanus Quintus Coredius Gallus Gargilius Antiquus (also known as Quintus Coredius Gallus Gargilius Antiquus) was a Roman senator of the 2nd century. He was suffect consul in the nundinium of May to June 119 as the colleague of Quintus Vibius Gallus. Gargilius Antiquus is primarily known through inscriptions.

== Biography ==
Gargilius Antiquus probably had his origins in North Africa. The praenomen of his father (Publius) and his tribe (Quirina) are known from inscriptions. The element "Marcus Paccius" points to a testimonial adoption by an otherwise unknown Paccius; Juvenal (12.99) mentions a rich but childless Paccius, who was pursued by legacy hunters. Gargilius Antiquus was the governor of Arabia Petraea from 116 to 119; in the latter year he was appointed suffect consul.

Based on an inscription recovered from Dor in 1948, Gargilius Antiquus was known to have been the governor of a province in the eastern part of the Empire, initially supposed to be Syria, between his consulate and his term governing Asia. In November 2016, an inscription in Greek was recovered off the coast of Dor by Haifa University underwater archaeologists, which attests to the fact that Antiquus was legate of the province of Judea sometime between 120 and 130, prior to the Bar Kokhba revolt.

Another inscription, also recovered from the seas near Dor, has been interpreted as showing Gargilius Antiquus was governor of Roman Syria after completing his tenure in Judea; if correct, this would mean he was legate of Judea between 120 and 125, then governor of Syria from 125 to 128, "just before Poblicius Marcellus, who governed the province from the summer of 128 CE until 134/5 CE." Later he returned to the East to serve as proconsular governor of Asia in 134/135.

He is attested as present in Rome on 15 October 138, when he was one of the witnesses for the Senatus consultum nundinus saltus Beguensis. He is known to have had a son, Lucius Pullaienus Gargilius Antiquus, who was suffect consul around 162.

Political offices
Preceded by Trajan III, and Aulus Platorius Nepos	Suffect consul of the Roman Empire; 119 with Quintus Vibius Gallus	Succeeded by Gaius Herennius Capella, and Lucius Coelius Rufus as suffect consuls
