= Publius Calpurnius Macer Caulius Rufus =

2nd century Roman senator, consul and governor

Publius Calpurnius Macer Caulius Rufus was a Roman senator of the 2nd century AD who held a number of offices in the imperial service, as well as serving as suffect consul for the nundinium of November to December 103 as the colleague of Annius Mela. His relationship to the Republican Calpurnii is unknown; he could be descended from a freedman of their family, or a cliens who was enrolled as a citizen with their help.

He was an acquaintance of Pliny the Younger, who called him Calpurnius Macer, and two letters to him from Pliny survive. Both are trivial works: one a short note about Pliny's life when he was on his rural estate, the other concerned with some local gossip concerning Lake Como. Macer is mentioned in a letter that the emperor Trajan wrote to Pliny, which is included in Pliny's collected letters: in responding to Pliny's proposal to drain Lake Sophon (modern Lake Sapanca), Trajan directs him to make a careful study of the land, and suggests he ask Calpurnius Macer for a surveyor.

Two sources -- one a military diploma, the other an inscription from Troesmis -- attest Calpurnius Macer as the governor of Lower Moesia; so it is likely he was governor at the time of this letter from the emperor. Werner Eck dates his tenure in this post as extending from the year 110 to 113, noting that a yet unidentified governor served between Macer and Lucius Fabius Justus.

Nothing further is known of Macer.

Political offices
Preceded by Marcus Flavius Aper, and Gaius Trebonius Proculus Mettius Modestus as suffect consuls	Suffect consul of the Roman Empire; 103 with (A?)nnius Mela	Succeeded by Sextus Attius Suburanus Aemilianus II, and Marcus Asinius Marcellus as ordinary consuls
