= Manius Acilius Aviola (consul AD 54) =

Roman consul in AD 54

Manius Acilius Aviola was a senator of the Roman Empire. He was consul ordinarius in AD 54 with Marcus Asinius Marcellus as his colleague. Aviola is also recorded as being governor of Asia in 65/66. According to Brian Jones, Aviola was also curator aquarum (or "superintendent of the aqueducts") from 74 to 97. He is known almost solely from surviving inscriptions.

Aviola has been identified as the son of Gaius Calpurnius Aviola, suffect consul of AD 24. Assuming that he became consul anno suo, he would have been born around AD 22, making this relationship more likely. He is known to have lived into Domitian's reign, and that he married Aedia Servilia, the daughter or niece of Marcus Servilius Nonianus (consul AD 35). Older authorities, such as Edmund Groag, have identified Aviola with the Avilius mentioned by Juvenal, but Gallivan has argued that the two are different people.

Although it is not known if Aviola had any children, Manius Acilius Aviola, suffect consul in 82, is sometimes identified as his son, while Manius Acilius Aviola, ordinary consul in 122, is sometimes identified as his grandson.

Political offices
Preceded by Publius Calvisius Ruso, and Quintus Caecina Primus as Suffect consuls	Consul of the Roman Empire; 54 with Marcus Asinius Marcellus	Succeeded by Marcus Aefulanus, and ignotus as Suffect consuls
