= Marcus Aefulanus =

Marcus Aefulanus was a Roman senator, who was active during the reigns of Claudius and Nero. He was suffect consul in the second half of 54. He is known to have held one other office, proconsular governor of the public province of Asia around 66/67. Aefulanus is only known from inscriptions.

Little is known about Tutor, who is the only member of the gens Aefulana to accede to the consulship, and only a little more about his gens. A Mons Aefulanus (modern Monte Sante Angelo in Arcese) is known, as well as a town of the same name on its slopes; the similar name suggests the suffect consul's family had its origins there. Less than a dozen Aefulani in total are attested, including a Marcus Aefulanus M.l. Primus, who is likely our Aefulanus' freedman or former slave. These include: one Titus Aefulanus, a local magistrate in Forum Cornelii (modern Imola); several wax tablets recovered from Pompeii mention a Publius Aefulanus Crysantus; inscriptions recovered from Augusta Emerita (near Merida, Spain) attest to four people (two freedmen) of that gens present there; and two inscriptions attest to a family of that name. Two letters of Pliny the Younger mention an Aefulanus Marcellinus. Except for the freedman Primus, there is no grounds for any of them being related to the consul.

Political offices
Preceded by Manius Acilius Aviola, and Marcus Asinius Marcellus as ordinary consuls	Suffect consul of the Roman Empire; 54 with ignotus	Succeeded by Nero, and Lucius Antistius Vetus as ordinary consuls
