= Legio I Minervia =

Roman legion

Map of the Roman Empire in AD 125, under emperor Hadrian, showing the Legio I Minervia, stationed on the river Rhine at Bonna (Bonn, Germany), in Germania Inferior province, between AD 82 until the 4th century

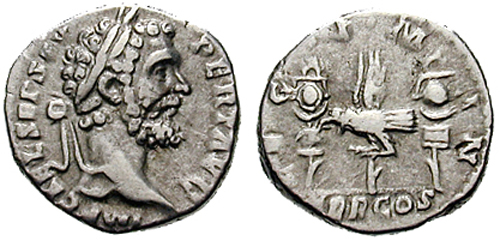
Denarius issued in 193 under Septimius Severus, to celebrate I Minervia, which had supported the commander of the Pannonian army in his fight for purple

Legio I Minervia (lit. First Legion "Minervan", i.e., "devoted to the goddess Minerva") was a legion of the Imperial Roman army founded in AD 82 by emperor Domitian (r. 81–96), for his campaign against the Germanic tribe of the Chatti. Its cognomen refers to the goddess Minerva, the legion's protector. There are still records of the I Minervia in the Rhine border region in the middle of the 4th century. The legion's emblem is an image of goddess Minerva.

Legio I Minervia first, and main, camp was in the city of Bonna (modern Bonn), in the province of Germania Inferior. In 89, they suppressed a revolt of the governor of Germania Superior. Due to this, Domitian gave them the cognomen Pia Fidelis Domitiana (loyal and faithful to Domitian) to acknowledge their support.

== History ==
Between 101 and 106, the legion fought the Dacian Wars of emperor Trajan, commanded by Hadrian, the future emperor. The emblem with Minerva figure appears on the column of Trajan in Rome, along with symbols of other legions. After this war, I Minervia returned to its home city of Bonna. Together with XXX Ulpia Victrix, stationed close by in Castra Vetera II (modern Xanten), they worked in numerous military and building activities, even extracting stone from quarries.

Although it belonged to the Germanic army and Bonn was its camp, vexillationes (subunits) of the legion were allocated in different parts of the Empire:

- 162–166 war against the Parthian Empire, commanded by emperor Lucius Verus
- 166–175 and 178–180 war against the Marcomanni, commanded by emperor Marcus Aurelius
- 173 campaign against the Chauci of Gallia Belgica, commanded by governor Didius Julianus
- 198–211 garrison of the city of Lugdunum, capital of Gallia

During the civil wars of the late 2nd and 3rd century, I Minervia supported the following emperors (each of them gave them the indicated titles, dropped out after their fall):

- Septimius Severus
- Elagabalus (Antoniniana)
- Alexander Severus (Severiana Alexandriana)
- The Gallic Empire, that existed between 260 and 274

Around 353, Bonna was destroyed by the Franks. Although Legio I Minervia disappears from recorded history, there is no account of its end, whether destroyed in battle or simply disbanded.

== Attested members ==
Name	Rank	Time frame	Province	Source
Quintus Sosius Senecio	legatus legionis	c. 93		CIL VI, 1444
Publius Aelius Hadrianus	legatus legionis	c. 103-106	Germania Inferior	Historia Augusta, "Hadrian", 3
Marcus Pontius Laelianus	legatus legionis	c. 138-c. 141	Germania Inferior	CIL VI, 1497
Lucius Pullaienus Gargilius Antiquus	legatus legionis	c. 155-c. 158	Germania Inferior	CIL III, 7394
Marcus Claudius Fronto	legatus legionis	162-c. 165	Germania Inferior	CIL VI, 1377
Gaius Scribonius Genialis	legatus legionis	166/169 or 177/180	Germania Inferior	CIL XIII, 12036
Lucius Calpurnius Proculus	legatus legionis	?180/185	Germania Inferior	CIL XIII, 8009
Claudius Stratonicus	legatus legionis	?184-?186	Germania Inferior	IGRR IV.570
Claudius Apollinaris	legatus legionis	?187-?189	Germania Inferior	CIL XIII, 7946
[...] Plotinus	legatus legionis	between 190 and 192	Germania Inferior	CIL XIII, 8598
Quintus Venidius Rufus Marius Maximus Lucius Calvinianus	legatus legionis	c. 193	Germania Inferior	CIL XIII, 7994
Titus Flavius Secundus Phillipianus	legatus legionis	c. 194-195/196?	Germania Inferior	CIL XIII, 1673
Gaius Julius Septimius Castinus	legatus legionis	c. 205 or c. 208		CIL XIII, 7945 = ILS 2549
Gaius Fabius Agrippinus	legatus legionis	c. 211		CIL XIII, 8050
Aufidius Coresinius Marcellus	legatus legionis	222-224		CIL XIII, 8035
Marcus Marius Titius Rufinus	legatus legionis	231		CIL XIII, 8017, CIL IX, 1584
Marcus Petronius Honoratus	tribunus angusticlavius	Before 138	Germania Inferior	CIL VI, 1625a, CIL VI, 1625b = ILS 1340
Gaius Bruttius Praesens	tribunus laticlavius	c. 90	Dacia	AE 1950, 66
Decimus Terentius Gentianus	tribunus laticlavius	before 106	Dacia	TLMN4, 4
Lucius Aninius Sextius Florentinus	tribunus laticlavius	c.110	Germania Inferior	CIL III, 14148,10
Lucius Antonius Albus	tribunus laticlavius	c. 115	Germania Inferior	AE 1972, 567
Marcus Servilius Fabianus Maximus	tribunus laticlavius	c. 140	Germania Inferior	CIL VI, 1517
Quintus Antistius Adventus	tribunus laticlavius	c. 153	Germania Inferior	AE 1893, 88
Lucius Aurelius Commodus Pompeianus	tribunus laticlavius	c. 190	Germania Inferior	
Quintus Petronius Melior	tribunus laticlavius	3rd century		CIL XI, 3367

== See also ==
- List of Roman legions
- Roman legion
