= Aulus Ducenius Geminus =

First century AD Roman senator and prefect of Rome

Aulus Ducenius Geminus was a Roman senator active in the first century AD. Geminus is best known as Galba's appointment as Urban prefect of Rome during the Year of Four Emperors.

Geminus had family connections with Patavium; he is one of three consular Ducenii that Ronald Syme identifies as a native of that town. The other two are Gaius Ducenius Proculus, consul in 87, and Publius Ducenius Verus, consul in 96.

== Life ==
Most of Geminus' career is known from an acephalic inscription (one where the name of the subject is missing) recovered from Epidaurus in Greece; Werner Eck has argued that the subject of this inscription is Geminus. The earliest office found on this inscription is that of quaestor, assigned to the province of Crete and Cyrenaica; the office of quaestor qualified Geminus for admission to the Roman Senate. Next is the traditional republican magistracy of plebeian tribune, after which there is a gap in the inscription. It can be assumed he was praetor, since Geminus had acceded to suffect consul.

The date of his consulate is variously given. The older authorities follow Edmund Groag's argument that Geminus was suffect consul in AD 54 or 55. However, Eck has more recently shown that a nundinium in either year 60 or 61 is more likely. Syme endorses the years 60 or 61, and builds on it the hypothesis that Geminus may owe his appointment to the consulate to Lucius Vitellius, one of Nero's comites, as had Titus Clodius Eprius Marcellus and Lucius Junius Quintus Vibius Crispus. Nevertheless, either date would fit the next known office: in the year 62 the emperor Nero appointed Geminus, along with Lucius Calpurnius Piso and Aulus Pompeius Paulinus, to a commission to manage the public revenues. According to the inscription from Epidurus, after stepping down from the consulate Geminus became a member of the quindecimviri sacris faciundis, one of the four most prestigious priesthoods of ancient Rome, and the sodales Augustales. During the reign of Nero, Geminus was appointed governor of Dalmatia; Syme dates his governorship prior to the year 69. A boundary stone attests that he participated in settling a dispute between Carinium (modern Karin Gornji in Croatia) and another community, possibly Ansium (modern Cvijina Gradina); other evidence records that he led a military expedition into Illyria.

Galba appointed Geminus as the replacement for Titus Flavius Sabinus as Urban prefect. Tacitus mentions Geminus' presence at the meeting when Galba announced on 10 January 69 that he would make Lucius Calpurnius Piso his heir. Gwyn Morgan suspects Galba's motivation was to keep the urban cohorts in control by a trusted associate. Syme, on the other hand, suspected the influence of someone in Galba's entourage. "Perhaps friends of Thrasea Paetus now coming back from exile," Syme writes. "Or, for that matter, the consular Silius Italicus should not too readily be discounted, despite his recent and questionable activities." Following the assassination of Galba and the ascension of Otho as emperor, Geminus lost his office and Flavius Sabinus was restored.

Geminus somehow survived the chaos of that year. The inscription from Epidurus and a second from Philadelphia both attest that he was proconsular governor of Asia. While older authorities who follow Groag's dating for Geminus' consulate date his tenure as governor to 68/69, Eck's more recent investigation supports a date of 73/74 as governor of Asia. His life after this governorship is so far unknown; as he was at least in his fifties when he concluded his proconsular office, Geminus might have died soon afterwards.
