= Aulus Marius Celsus =

1st century Roman senator, military officer and governor

Aulus Marius Celsus was a Roman senator who held several offices in the emperor's service during the first century AD, as well as playing a role in the Year of Four Emperors. He was suffect consul of the nundinium of July to August 69 as the colleague of Gnaeus Arrius Antoninus.

== Life ==
Ronald Syme suggests that Marius Celsus was a native of Nemausus in Gallia Narbonensis (modern Nîmes), based on the existence of Gaius Marius Celsus, a magistrate of that city and husband of Pompeia the daughter of Toutodivix.

His career began under Nero. Celsus' earliest known appointment was legatus legionis or commander of the Legio XV Apollinaris, first in Pannonia, then in Asia Minor. Nero designated Celsus suffect consul for a designated nundinium in 69 before his death.

After the suicide of Nero, Galba made him part of his inner circle; Celsus was present, along with Aulus Ducenius Geminus, Urban prefect, when Galba announced Piso Licinianus as his choice for his heir. Then Celsus was assigned to meet with the vexillations from the Illyrian legions camped in the Porticus Vipsania and convince them to accept Galba's choice of heir; the soldiers drove him away at spear-point. After Galba's death, Celsus was in great danger of being killed by the soldiers for he had visibly shown his loyalty to Galba. Otho saved him with cunning and took him into his own inner circle.

Upon hearing that Vitellius was marching on Rome with the Rhine legions, Otho picked Celsus, along with Suetonius Paullinus and Appius Annius Gallus to lead the troops in Rome against them. During the Battle of Locus Castorum, where the two armies first met, Celsus commanded the cavalry, which was the first group to encounter the enemy.

Despite the Othonian victory at Locus Castorum, the decisive battle was still to come: Bedriacum. Celsus' military knowledge was esteemed enough that he was included in Otho's council prior to the battle; there he supported Suetonius' advice that the Othonian forces play for time so they could be joined by other units expected from the Illyrian provinces and the Danubean legions. However, Otho decided on engaging the opposing forces immediately. The two generals were reduced to members of Licinius Proculus's staff, "advisers in name, in fact as scapegoats for any mishaps that occurred," as Gwyn Morgan pointedly notes. This battle went against Otho. During the fighting Celsus had joined Lucius Salvius Otho Titianus, and was with him when Titianus returned to their camp; Celsus called a meeting of the officers where he recommended surrender, and, the following morning, accompanied Annius Gallus to the Vitellian camp to negotiate that surrender.

Some days later, Vitellius had caught up with his soldiers and considered what to do with the surviving generals who had sided with Otho. Suetonius and Proculus claimed they had actually supported Vitellius, and had done everything they could to sabotage Otho's military effectiveness, but received only his contempt in exchange. Otho's brother Titianus was pardoned because of his loyalty and incompetence. Only Marius came out of this well; Vitellius seems to have thought of him as an honorable man. The new emperor overlooked his earlier loyalties, and immediately took Celsus among his confidants. Celsus was allowed to keep the consulship that Otho had assigned him, although he lost one month from the promised nundinium so Vitellius could reward his supporters with suffect consulships.

Under Emperor Vespasian, Celsus served as governor of the important imperial provinces of Germania Inferior in 71–73, leading Syme to make "the rational assumption that he terminated the Batavian Rebellion." Whether this assumption is correct, it is clear that after his posting in Germany was concluded, Celsus was swiftly transferred to Syria (73-74). It is possible that Celsus died while governor of the latter province; Marcus Ulpius Traianus is attested as governor there shortly after Celsus' arrival.

Political offices
Preceded by Titus Flavius Sabinus, and Gnaeus Arulenus Caelius Sabinus	Consul of the Roman Empire; 69 with Gnaeus Arrius Antoninus	Succeeded by Fabius Valens, and Aulus Caecina Alienus
