= Gaius Octavius Tidius Tossianus Lucius Javolenus Priscus =

1st/2nd century AD Roman senator and jurist

Consul of the Roman Republic
- In office September 86 – December 86 Serving with Aulus Bucius Lappius Maximus
- Preceded by: Sextus Octavius Fronto with Tiberius Julius Candidus Marius Celsus
- Succeeded by: Domitian XIII with Lucius Volusius Saturninus

Personal details
- Born: Unknown
- Died: Unknown

Military service
- Allegiance: Roman Empire
- Commands: Proconsul of Africa; Governor of Germania Superior; Governor of Britain; Governor of Syria; Governor of Numidia; Pontifex

Gaius Octavius Tidius Tossianus Lucius Javolenus Priscus was a Roman senator and jurist who flourished during the Flavian dynasty. Many of his judgments are quoted in the Digest. Priscus served as suffect consul for the nundinium (period) September to December 86 AD as the colleague of Aulus Bucius Lappius Maximus.

== Name ==
Map of the Roman Empire during the Year of the Four Emperors (69)

The shorter version of his name is "Lucius Javolenus Priscus", or simply "Javolenus Priscus". His full name is known from CIL III, 9960, where the second praenomen is written inside the second O of Tossiaano (sic), leading Olli Salomies to suggest in his monograph on Imperial Roman naming practices that "Lucius" was "added at some later stage, perhaps erroneously". However, several inscriptions give his name as "Lucius Javolenus Priscus".

Anthony Birley notes that his names "Javolenus, Tidius, and Tossianus all point to Umbria, and specifically Iguvium as the origo of Priscus." However Birley points to Géza Alföldy's argument that he ought to be connected with the Octavii of Nedium in Dalmatia where Javolenus Priscus had been honored. "It therefore seems quite probable that he was born a C. Octavius, and that he received his other names by adoption into an Umbrian family." However, Salomies argues that if he was adopted, "from the order of the names we should surely rather conclude that he was a L. Iavolenus adopted by a C. Octavius."

== Imperial career ==
There is no historical record of Javolenus Priscus prior to his taking command of Legio IV Flavia Felix, stationed near Burnum, in modern Croatia; it may be he was adlected into the Senate inter praetorios. He was next appointed legatus legionis or commander of Legio III Augusta in 83, serving as the de facto governor of Numidia. Birley believes it was in 84 when Javolenus Priscus came to Roman Britain and served as a juridicus (senior judge) and remained there for two years. He returned to Rome where he held his consulship; becoming a consul was considered the highest honor of the Roman state. A military diploma attests that on 26 October 90 Priscus was governor of Germania Superior. He was governor of the province of Syria at the beginning of Trajan's reign. For the term 101/102 he was proconsul of Africa, which occupied the territory of modern Tunisia. Returning once again to Rome, Priscus was co-opted into the College of Pontiffs, the most important of the four major colleges of ancient Roman priests; their duties included overseeing the state cult and providing advice on sacral law.

== Career as a jurist ==
Birley notes that Javolenus Priscus' "principal claim to fame was as a jurist." Of the many citations of his legal opinions, one concerns the will of Seius Saturninus, archigubernus ex classe Britannica, a case which must have come before him while he was juridicus in Britain. He was the leader of the Sabinian school, and was the teacher of the jurist Salvius Julianus.

He is best known for his saying that "every definition in civil law is dangerous, for rare are those that cannot be subverted." (Omnis definitio in iure civili periculosa est; parum est enim, ut non subverti posset.)

Political offices
Preceded by Sextus Octavius Fronto, and Tiberius Julius Candidus Marius Celsus as Suffect consuls	Suffect consul of the Roman Empire; 86 with Aulus Bucius Lappius Maximus	Succeeded by Domitian XIII, and Lucius Volusius Saturninus as Ordinary consuls
