= Lucius Volusius Saturninus (consul 87) =

1st century Roman senator and consul

Lucius Volusius Saturninus was a Roman Senator who lived in the 1st century. He served as an ordinary consul in 87, as the colleague of the emperor Domitian. He is known entirely from inscriptions.

Saturninus was of patrician status, one of three known children of Quintus Volusius Saturninus and his wife Nonia Torquata; the others included Quintus Volusius Saturninus, consul of 92, and Volusia Torquata. According to inscriptional evidence, his wife was a patrician named Licinia Cornelia. Licinia and Saturninus had a son called Lucius Volusius Torquatus, father of Lucius Volusius Saturninus.

== Sources ==
- B. Jones, The Emperor Domitian (Google eBook), Routledge, 2002
- J. Rüpke, Fasti sacerdotum, Franz Steiner Verlag, 2005

Political offices
Preceded by Aulus Bucius Lappius Maximus, and Gaius Octavius Tidius Tossianus Lucius Javolenus Priscus as Suffect consuls	Consul of the Roman Empire; 87 with Domitian XIII, followed by Gaius Calpurnius Piso Crassus Frugi Licinianus	Succeeded by Gaius Bellicius Natalis Publius Gavidius Tebanianus, and Gaius Ducenius Proculus as Suffect consuls
