= Legio II Traiana Fortis =

Roman legion

Map of the Roman Empire in AD 125, under emperor Hadrian, showing the Legio II Traiana, stationed at Alexandria (Alexandria, Egypt), in Aegyptus province, from AD 125 until the 4th century

Legio II Traiana, (lit. Second Legion "Trajan") was a legion of the Imperial Roman army raised by emperor Trajan, along with XXX Ulpia Victrix, for the campaigns in Dacia. Records of the II Traiana Fortis have been recovered from Egypt dating to the middle of the 5th century. The legion's emblem was the demi-god Hercules.

== Origins ==
According to Cassius Dio, it was Trajan who raised both the II Traiana and the XXX Ulpia Victrix, but the details and order are not clear. H.M.D. Parker has argued that the XXX Ulpia was raised first, at the time there were 29 legions, then after Legio XXI Rapax vanished—either destroyed in battle against barbarian invaders or in a civil disturbance—the II Traiana came into existence.

The date of the legion's creation is also not certain, although Graham Webster assigns it to the year 101. The earliest dated inscription referring to the legion, which sets out the cursus honorum of Lucius Cossonius Gallus, again entangles the XXI Rapax in the origins of this legion, for Gallus was first a military tribune with the first unit, then some years later commissioned commander of the II Traiana most likely after he had distinguished himself in Trajan's First Dacian War. About the only firm date is that Legio II Traiana was in existence by 108, the year Gallus was suffect consul.

== Campaigns ==
=== Parthian Campaign and Judean revolts ===
In 115, Legio II Traiana Fortis was added to the large army of Trajan's Parthian Campaign. In 117, the legion was allocated in Judaea, to ensure the peace. During a period of strife with Parthia in 123, Tiberius Claudius Quartinus led a vexillatio, or detachment, drawn from II Traiana and Legio III Cyrenaica to the banks of the Euphrates River ahead of the emperor Hadrian's entourage. In 125, they were sent to Aegyptus for the first time, to share camp in Nicopolis (next to Alexandria), together with XXII Deiotariana. Between 132 and 136 they were again in Judaea to deal with the Bar Kokhba Revolt. An inscription dated to the reign of Marcus Aurelius attests that by that time the II Traiana was the only legion stationed in Roman Egypt.

=== Siege in Alexandria ===
The legion was in its base in Nicopolis when south Egypt revolted against Roman rule. In the ensuing Bucolic War, Alexandria was besieged for months. Despite plague and famine, the defenders remained resolute.

Rescue for the Traiana came when Avidius Cassius arrived with the legions of Syria in 172. The legion was awarded the cognomen "Fortis" ("valiant") for the valiant defense of "Rome's Bread Basket". Cassius was ruler of the east for a time, while Marcus Aurelius was busy in his Marcomannic Wars.

Thinking that his emperor was dead, Cassius declared himself emperor with the blessing of Aurelius' wife; however, the legion learned that Aurelius was leading the legions of the Danube to fight the rebels. The legion, with the others, cut off Cassius' head and sent it to Aurelius, who took no punitive action against the troops.

=== Syrian Rebellion ===
The history of II Traiana Fortis gives an example of the political role of the legions. In 194, Pescennius Niger, governor of the province of Syria, rebelled with the support of, among others, II Traiana Fortis. His rival was Septimius Severus who would become emperor. In the days before the final battle, the legion changed sides and vowed fidelity to Severus. This would prove to be decisive for Pescennius' defeat.

=== Campaign Against the Germanic Tribes ===
In the beginnings of the 3rd century, the legion was involved in Caracalla's campaign against Germanic tribes and received the cognomen Germanica.

=== Move to Apollonopolis Magna ===
According to Notitia Dignitatum (composed c. 400), in early 5th century II Traiana Fortis was moved to Apollonopolis Magna, in the southern part of Aegyptus, and later served, at least with some vexillationes, under the Comes limitis Aegypti.

== See also ==
- List of Roman legions
