= Marcus Asinius Marcellus =

1st century AD Roman senator and consul

Marcus Asinius Marcellus was the name of two men of the Asinii.

== Marcus Asinius Marcellus, the Elder ==
Marcus Asinius Marcellus was consul in 54 as the colleague of Manius Acilius Aviola; it was the same year the Emperor Claudius died. According to Paul von Rohden, Marcellus was the son of Marcus Asinius Agrippa, consul in 25, and the paternal grandson of Vipsania Agrippina, although he admits to the slight chance Marcellus was a grandson of Asinia and Marcus Claudius Marcellus.

Marcellus was a Senator active in the reigns of the emperors Claudius and Nero. In the year 60 Marcellus was caught up in a scandal involving a relative of a Praetor who forged his will. The associates in the scandal were disgraced and punished. Although Marcellus was also disgraced and his accomplices executed, he escaped punishment because the Emperor Nero intervened--reportedly because he was "great-grandson of Asinius Pollio and bore a character far from contemptible."

Political offices
Preceded by Publius Calvisius Ruso, and Quintus Caecina Primus as Suffect consuls	Consul of the Roman Empire; 54 with Manius Acilius Aviola	Succeeded by Marcus Aefulanus, and ignotus as Suffect consuls

== Marcus Asinius Marcellus, the Younger ==
The younger Marcus Asinius Marcellus was a consul ordinarius in 104 as the colleague of Sextus Attius Suburanus Aemilianus, and son or grandson of the consul of 54. Edmund Groag suggested he is identical to the homonymous man mentioned as a member of the College of Pontifices around AD 101/102. Nothing more is known of him.

Political offices
Preceded by (A?)nnius Mela, and Publius Calpurnius Macer Caulius Rufus as Suffect consuls	Consul of the Roman Empire; AD 104 with Sextus Attius Suburanus	Succeeded by Tiberius Julius Candidus Marius Celsus, and Gaius Antius Aulus Julius Quadratus II as Ordinary consuls
