= Publius Petronius =

1st century AD Roman senator, consul and governor

Publius Petronius was a Roman senator, who was active during the reigns of Tiberius, Caligula and Claudius.

== Family ==
=== Marriage and Children ===
He was the husband of Plautia, sister of Aulus Plautius (conqueror and first governor of Britain), attested in an inscription.

According to Tacitus, the daughter of Publius Petronius and Plautia, named Petronia, married Aulus Vitellius the Younger, who was during the Year of Four Emperors (69) briefly emperor. They had divorced prior to that year: Tacitus states that Aulus Vitellius 'feared and hated' a man by the name of Dolabella, as he had married his divorced wife, Petronia. He consequently had Dolabella put to death by the side of the road.

Petronius was the father, possibly by adoption, of Publius Petronius Turpilianus, who became the governor of Britain during the years 61–63. Tacitus in his Agricola writes that, during his governorship, Turpilianus quieted the existing troubles but took no further moves.

== Career ==
=== Emperor Tiberius ===
Petronius was of the Senatorial class and he was appointed suffect consul in the second half of the year 19, replacing Lucius Norbanus Balbus.

=== Emperor Caligula ===
==== Governor of Syria ====
The sortition also awarded him the proconsulate of Asia; however, Petronius is best known as having appointed legatus or governor of Syria in 39, probably arriving in the country late in the year. A.A. Barrett lists him as an example of the "excellent appointments" made by an emperor often dismissed as mentally unbalanced.

As Governor of all Syria Petronius was assisted by lesser officials in charge of various areas. The Prefect of Judea at this time was Marcellus who had arrived only a year earlier, and at about the same time as Petronius' appointment (Herod) Agrippa I (grandson of Herod the Great) had Galilee and Peraea added to his domains, but he was not then in the country.

In the winter of 39/40 the Greek population of Jamnia in Judea erected an altar to the imperial cult (worship of the emperor) and the resident Jews promptly tore it down, resulting in serious communal rioting.

The destruction of an altar for his own worship was apparently taken as a personal insult by Caligula who was already beset by strife between Jews and Greeks in Alexandria, both of whom had delegations in Rome seeking his adjudication. The emperor struck a counterblow by instructing Petronius that the temple at Jerusalem should be converted into an imperial shrine with an enormous statue of the emperor in the guise of the Romans' supreme god Jupiter. The Governor was to use two of his available four legions to enforce this decree.

This proposal struck at the very heart of the religion of the Jews who were an important element of the population and business sector of most cities throughout the empire (as shown in The Acts of the Apostles and attested by Roman historians). Petronius had already made a preliminary study of Jewish philosophy and so was aware of the troubles that were brewing.

He ordered the construction of the statue in Sidon but told the sculptors to be in no hurry while he sought to negotiate with the Jews. He marched his two legions to Ptolomais on the border of Galilee where he was met with a massive demonstration. Leaving his army, he went on to Tiberias, capital of Galilee, where he met a high-profile delegation which made it clear that they were being asked to accept the impossible. It appears that there were no overt threats of violence, though it was clearly in the wind, and the harvest (40) was being neglected already, which could bring famine to Tyre and Sidon and other neighbouring areas (see Acts 12:20-24 just four years later).

Petronius withdrew his forces and bought more time while he wrote to Caligula with an appeal to change his mind in view of the dangerous course that events were taking. There are various versions of what happened next. One has it that the emperor responded with fury and told Petronius to get on as ordered and followed that up with an order for him to commit suicide. All agree that the one man from whom Caligula would take advice, Herod Agrippa, arrived back in Rome previously unaware of what was brewing and persuaded him to offer to rescind the temple order in exchange for Jewish promises not to interfere with the imperial cult outside of Jerusalem.

In any event, the news of Caligula's assassination in January 41 arrived in Syria and Judea before either the suicide order or the new offer.

=== Emperor Claudius ===
Claudius (r. 24 January 41 – 13 October 54) became the new emperor immediately, aided by Marcus Julius Agrippa I (Hasmonean branch of the Herodian dynasty) who was rewarded with sovereignty over Judea and Samaria in addition to his existing rule, and Petronius was recalled to Rome.

Political offices
Preceded by Marcus Junius Silanus Torquatus, and Lucius Norbanus Balbus as ordinary consuls	Suffect consul of the Roman Empire; 19 with Marcus Junius Silanus Torquatus	Succeeded by Marcus Valerius Messala, and Marcus Aurelius Cotta Maximus Messalinus as ordinary consuls
