= Priestly caste =

Social group

The priestly caste is a social group responsible for officiating over sacrifices and leading prayers or other religious functions, particularly in nomadic and tribal societies.

In some cases, as with the Brahmins of India and the Kohanim and Levites of ancient Israel, the caste was a hereditary one, with a person's position as a priest depending on his biological descent. Zoroastrianism also has a hereditary priesthood, as does Alevism, Yezidism and Yarsanism. In Sufism, the spiritual guide is also often a hereditary leader, while the Sayyids of South Asia, who claim descent from the Islamic Prophet Muhammad, have been described as a priestly caste. The Archiereis responsible for the Roman imperial cult were often related and at least in the Greek East, there appear to have been even dynasties of high priests.

In the Russian Eastern Orthodox Church, the clergy, over time, formed a hereditary caste of priests. Marrying outside of these priestly families was strictly forbidden; indeed, some bishops did not even tolerate their clergy marrying outside of the priestly families of their diocese. In 1867, the Synod abolished family claims to clerical positions. Within the lands of the Ukrainian Greek Catholic Church, the largest Eastern Catholic Church, priests' children often became priests and married within their social group, establishing a tightly knit hereditary caste.

In other cases, as with the Druids of the Celtic world and the shamans of ancient Eurasian nomads, the position within the caste may have depended more upon apprenticeship; the exact nature of the "caste" in these cases is difficult to ascertain due to lack of primary sources.
