= Gaius Norbanus Flaccus (consul 24 BC) =

Roman consul, 1st century BC

Gaius Norbanus Flaccus (fl. 1st century BC) was a Roman senator who was appointed Roman consul in 24 BC as the colleague of the emperor Augustus.

== Biography ==
A member of the Nobiles, Flaccus was the son of Gaius Norbanus Flaccus, who had been consul in 38 BC. The father possessed a good relationship with Augustus, and this connection was continued with the younger Flaccus, who became consul as the colleague of the emperor. In either 18/17 or 17/16 BC, the sortition appointed him proconsular governor of Asia. Flaccus was also a member of the Quindecimviri sacris faciundis.

Flaccus was married to Cornelia Balba, a daughter of Lucius Cornelius Balbus the Younger, and they had at least three children: Gaius Norbanus Flaccus (consul of AD 15), Lucius Norbanus Balbus (consul of AD 19) and a daughter, Norbana Clara.

== Sources ==
- PIR ² N 167

Political offices
Preceded by Augustus IX, and Marcus Junius Silanus	Consul of the Roman Empire; 24 BC with Augustus X	Succeeded by Augustus XI, and Gnaeus Calpurnius Piso
