= Sextus Julius Major =

2nd-century Roman senator, consul and governor

Sextus Julius Major was a Roman senator active during the first half of the second century, and who held several positions in the service of the emperor. Major was suffect consul around 126. Major's origins were with the "high aristocracy" of Asia Minor. Ronald Syme notes his ancestors included Polemon I the king of Pontus and Antonia Pythodoris.

== Career ==
No cursus honorum for Julius Major has yet been recovered, but evidence for a number of offices he held have been recovered. The earliest office known for him is legatus legionis or commander of Legio III Augusta, which was stationed at Lambaesis in Numidia (which Syme notes "normally carried designation to a consulship") in 125 and 126. Following his consulship, Major was appointed governor of the imperial province of Moesia Inferior between 131 and 135, then governor of the important imperial province of Syria from 137 to 139.

Julius Major concluded his career by holding a proconsulate in 141/142, but opinion is divided whether he was proconsul of Africa or Asia: Syme notes the evidence supports either province, although he believes it is likely Julius was proconsul of Asia, an opinion Géza Alföldy concurs with.

== Family ==
He was married to Julia Antonia Eurydice, a wealthy aristocratic woman known from seven inscriptions at Nysa on the Maeander relating to a series of statues of the imperial family of Marcus Aurelius and Lucius Verus, which were erected per the directions in her will. These statues have been dated between the years 148 and 150, and because they omit his name suggest Julius Major was dead by then. These inscriptions also provide information about their three children:

- Sextus Julius Major Antoninus Pythodorus;
- Julia, a daughter otherwise unknown;
- Marcus Julius Major Maximius, attested as a quaestor and aedile.
