= Lucius Junius Quintus Vibius Crispus =

1st century AD Roman senator and consul

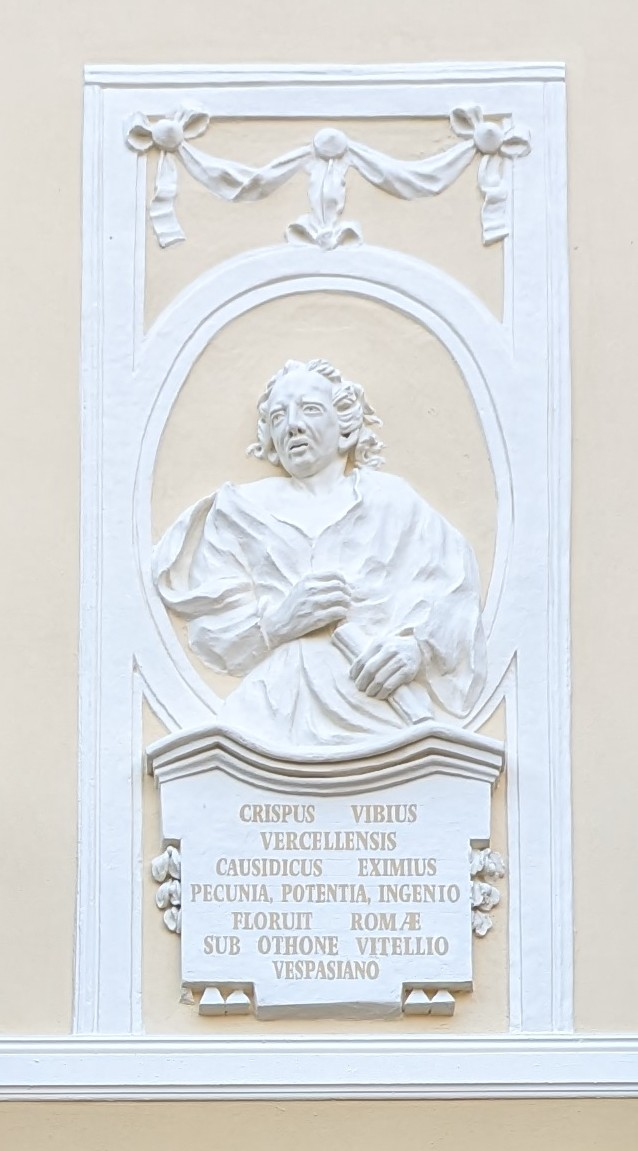
The sculpture of Quintus Vibius Crispus

Lucius Junius Quintus Vibius Crispus (sometimes known as Quintus Vibius Crispus) was a Roman senator and amicus or companion of the Emperors, known for his wit. He was a three-time suffect consul.

== Family ==
Crispus came from a family of the equestrian order, a member of the gens Vibia. According to Tacitus, Crispus was born in Vercellae. According to Olli Salomies, Crispus was born Quintus Vibius, and adopted by a Lucius Junius some time before his second consulate. His brother was Lucius Vibius Secundus; if Crispus was the younger brother, that would not only indicate his father's name was Lucius Vibius, but offer an explanation for his adoptive status.

Quintus Vibius Secundus, suffect consul in 86, is considered his son. It is unknown if Crispus is related to Lucius Vibius Sabinus, father of the Roman empress Vibia Sabina.

== Life ==
Crispus' life before he achieved the consulate for the first time, during the reign of Nero, is known only indirectly. Tacitus, in his Histories, implies that he was a delator, or informer, during those years, which would explain the source for some of his reputed fortune. The date of his first consulate is not known. Proposed dates range from before the year 56 (Bosworth) to as late as 63 or 64 (Gallivan); the years 56-60 can be eliminated because all of the suffect consuls are known for those years. In a more recent study of dated documents from Herculaneum, Giuseppe Camodeca narrowed the possible dates to either 60 or 61.

Crispus' first recorded appearance was towards the end of the year 60. During that year his brother was convicted for extortion on a charge brought by the Mauretanians and was expelled from Italy. Crispus, through his influence in the Roman Senate, managed to save his brother from a worse sentence.

In the year 68, Crispus was appointed curator aquarum (or supervisor of aqueducts) in Rome. Crispus was prominent during the chaos of the Year of Four Emperors on several occasions. Once, in the Senate, he prosecuted an equites, Annius Faustus, for being a delator — Faustus had informed against his brother, possibly in connection to his crimes against the Mauretanians. Although Crispus managed to win his suit against Faustus, Tacitus notes it was against fierce opposition: "Many remembered that Crispus had followed the same profession with profit; nor was it the penalty but the prosecutor that they disliked." Tacitus notes he was prominent later that year in the Senate in the prosecution of delatores active during Nero's reign.

His other appearance was as an amicus of Vitellius, where he provided a memorable example of that emperor's gluttony. Vitellius was fond of indulging in marathons of feasting, and Crispus was forced to absent himself from one of these due to illness. Dio Cassius quotes Crispus as remarking afterwards, "If I had not fallen ill, I surely would have perished."

Despite having been an intimate of Vitellius, Crispus recovered his standing after Vespasian defeated him and emerged as the victor. He was permitted to participate in the sortition and was allocated proconsular governorship of Africa in 71/72, His legate, Gaius Flavius, was recorded as setting a record sailing from that province to Ostia in two days. A few years later Crispus acceded to the suffect consulship a second time for the nundinium of March–April 74 as the colleague of Titus. At some period under Vespasian's reign he was appointed governor of Hispania Tarraconensis.

Crispus maintained his position as amicus during the reign of Vespasian's younger son, Domitian. "Although no one could have been a more useful advisor to Domitian, he limited his conversation with the emperor to safe topics — how wet it's been, how hot; never uttering his private opinions or staking his life on the truth." It was Domitian who granted him a third suffect consulship, in either the year 82 or the year 83. On one occasion during this time, when asked if anyone was closeted with the Emperor, Crispus wittily answered, "No, not even a fly", a sarcastic reference to Domitian's reputed habit of killing insects and displaying them on the end of a pin or writing stylus.

If one of Martial's Epigrams actually refers to Crispus, he may have been dead by the year 90; Martial wrote a poem published that year about a Crispus who had squandered his entire fortune on himself and left his wife penniless.

Political offices
Preceded by Tiberius Plautius Silvanus Aelianus II, and Titus Caesar Vespasianus III	Suffect consul of the Roman Empire; 74 with Titus Caesar Vespasianus III	Succeeded by Quintus Petillius Cerialis Caesius Rufus II, and Titus Clodius Eprius Marcellus II as Suffect consuls
