= Lucius Pullaienus Gargilius Antiquus =

Lucius Pullaienus Gargilius Antiquus was a Roman senator, who held a number of offices in the imperial service during the reign of Antoninus Pius. He is known to have been a suffect consul in the early years of the reign of Marcus Aurelius, most likely in the year 162. He is known entirely from inscriptions.

His cursus honorum is partially known from an inscription set up at Marmaraereglisi / Perinthus in Thracia. Antiquus began his career as one of the decemviri stlitibus judicandis, one of the four boards that form the vigintiviri; membership in one of these four boards was a preliminary and required first step toward gaining entry into the Roman Senate. Next was commissioned military tribune with Legio III Gallica, which was stationed in Syria. He was appointed quaestor as a candidate of the emperor, and upon completion of this traditional Republican magistracy Antiquus would be enrolled in the Senate. Two more of the traditional Republican magistracies followed: plebeian tribune, then praetor around the year 150.

After stepping down as praetor, Antiquus was appointed curator of the viae tres Trajana: the Via Clodia, Via Cassia, and Via Ciminia; Alföldy dates this office from around the year 152 to around 155. Then he was commissioned legatus legionis or commander of Legio I Minervia from around the year 155 to around 158. The third office he held before acceding to the consulate was as governor of the imperial province of Thracia, which Alföldy dates from around the year 158 to around 161.

His life after he stepped down as consul is a blank.
