= Tiberius Plautius Silvanus Aelianus =

1st-century AD Roman senator and consul

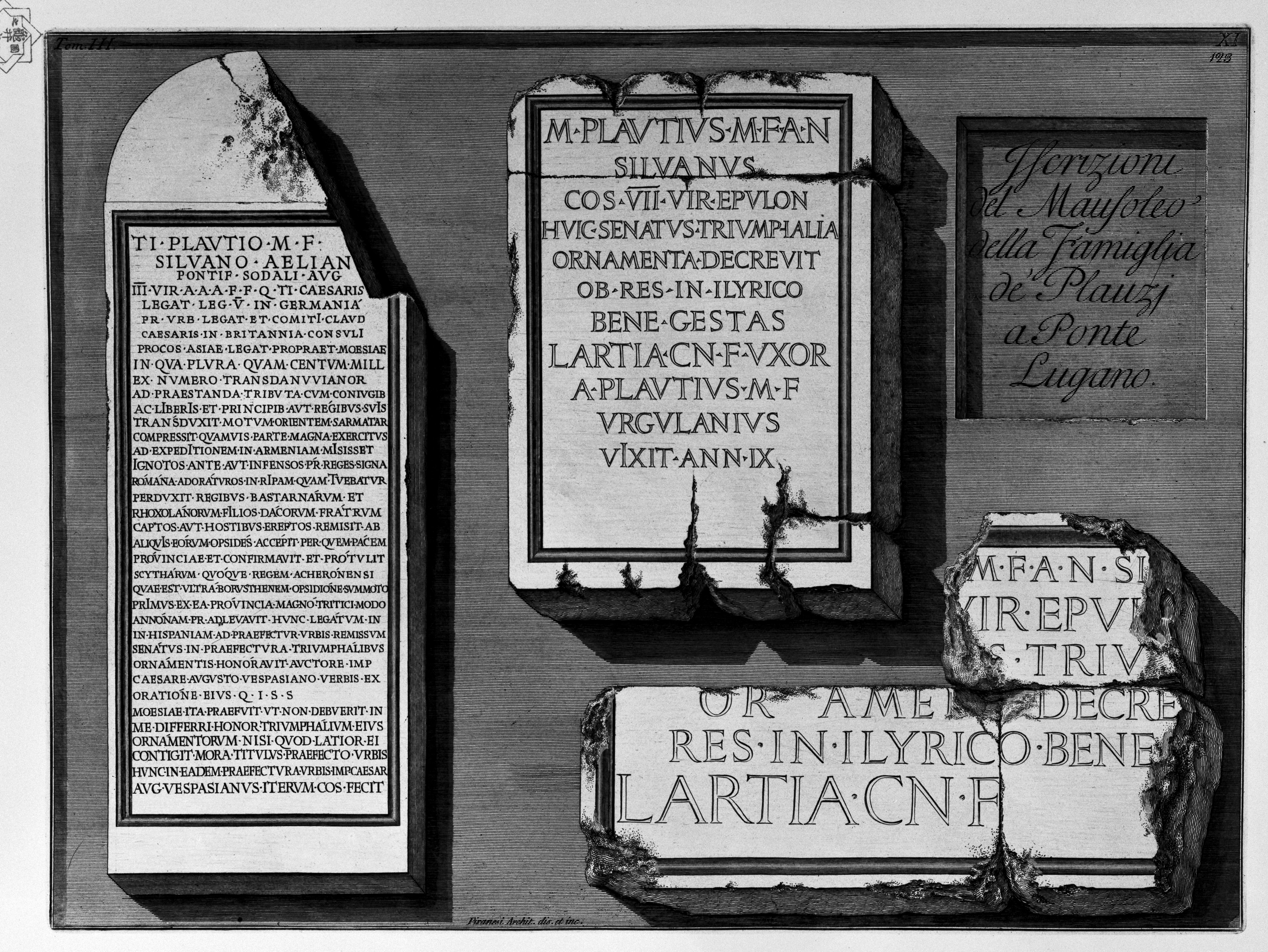
Roman funeral inscriptions reproduced by Giovanni Battista Piranesi, from the family grave of the Plautia gens in Tivoli (Italy). Inscription CIL XIV, 3608 = AE 1956, 208 refers to Tiberius Plautius Silvanus Aelianus and his deeds.

Tiberius Plautius Silvanus Aelianus was a Roman patrician who twice served as consul, in 45 and 74 AD. He was the natural son of Lucius Aelius Lamia and the adopted son of Marcus Plautius Silvanus, brother of Plautia Urgulanilla, first wife of the emperor Claudius. It is known he offered up the prayer as pontifex when the first stone of the new Capitol was laid in 70 AD. In some ancient sources he is referred to as Plautius Aelianus, but we learn from an inscription that his full name was Tiberius Plautius Silvanus Aelianus, and that he held many important military commands.

Under Nero he served as the legate of Moesia from 61 to 66 AD, and ruled the province with a "massive scorched earth policy", and from which he is said to have sent shipments of Moesian wheat to alleviate the food supply of the Roman people, possibly in crisis due to the Great Fire of Rome in 64 AD. Later, he was sent to Hispania, which at the time lacked a provincial governor. However in 69 AD the emperor Vespasian wished to appoint Aelianus Urban prefect of Rome in place of his murdered brother, Sabinus. As we know from his funerary inscription, Aelianus was in fact recalled to the city, where Vespasian proposed he receive a triumph for his service in Moesia, a gesture implicitly indicting the ungenerous nature of Nero's rule. The senate ultimately voted to approve Vespasian's proposal.

Around 60 AD, Aelianus had brought across the Danube in Moesia "more than 100,000 Transdanubians along with their wives children chiefs or kings (and settled) to pay tribute".

He had a son, Lucius Aelius Lamia Plautius Aelianus, consul 80.

Political offices
Preceded by Publius Calvisius Sabinus Pomponius Secundus, and Titus Statilius Taurus as ordinary consuls	Suffect Consul of the Roman Empire; 45 with Titus Statilius Taurus Corvinus	Succeeded by Aulus Antonius Rufus, and Marcus Pompeius Silvanus Staberius Flavianus as suffect consuls
Preceded by Imp. Caesar Vespasianus Augustus V, and Titus Caesar Vespasianus III as ordinary consuls	Suffect Consul of the Roman Empire; 74 with Titus Caesar Vespasianus III	Succeeded by Lucius Junius Quintus Vibius Crispus II as suffect consul
