= Gaius Norbanus Sorex =

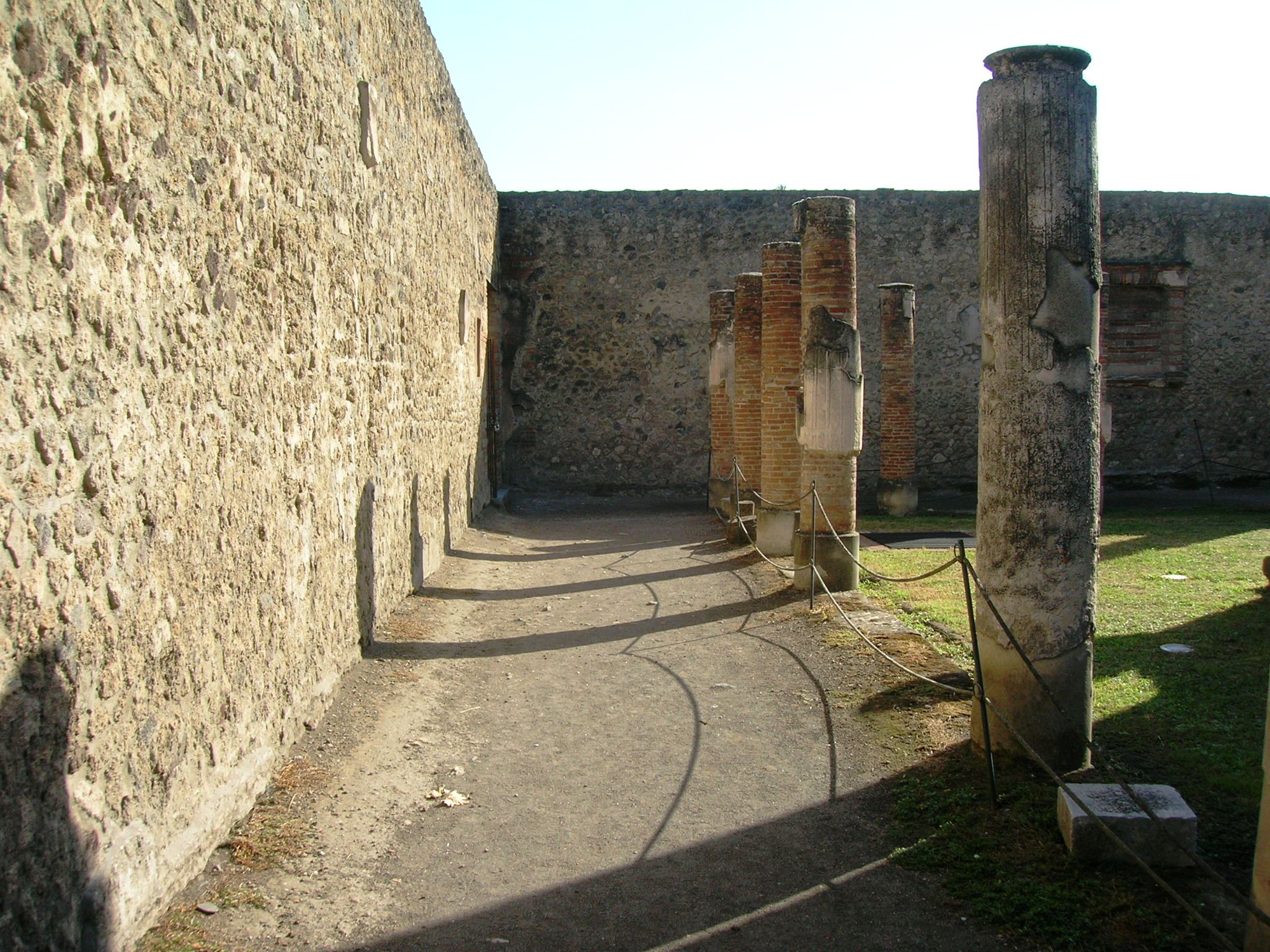
Portico of the Temple of Isis at Pompeii

Caius Norbanus Sorex was an actor who lived in Italy and was active at Pompeii and Nemi during the time of Augustus.

Sorex is depicted in an inscribed bronze herm portrait discovered in the precinct of the Temple of Isis at Pompeii. The herm, located in the southwest corner of the portico was most likely a votive offering to the goddess. The inscription reads:

C(aii) Norbani Soricis [actor] secundarum [partium] mag(istri) pagi Aug(usti) Felicis suburbani ex d(ecreto) d(ecurionum) loc(o) d(ato)

"The portrait of Caius Norbanus Sorex, a secondary actor, magistrate of the suburban district of Augustus Felix, (was set) in a place given by the decree of the decurions."

Sorex is also attested on the inscribed support for another herm found in the Eumachia building on the forum of Pompeii and another at the sanctuary of Diana in Nemi.
