= Asiarch =

Prominent position in the Roman province of Asia

Asiarch (Ancient Greek: Ἀσιάρχης, romanized: Asiarches, lit. 'ruler of Asia') was a prominent position in the Roman province of Asia, the nature of which is not entirely clear. The Asiarchs were probably the annual representatives of the most important cities in the province, who presided over the provincial assembly (koinon) and had to organize and carry out the public games in honor of the gods and in the Roman imperial cult at their expense. Asiarchs were based in the cities where this festival took place and where the temples of the gods concerned were located, for example Ephesus and Pergamon. They were elected by the cities and confirmed by the Roman proconsul. Asiarchs are known from numerous inscriptions, but are also mentioned in Acts (19:31) and in the Martyrdom of Polycarp.

In research, the identity of the Asiarchs with the "high priests of the (province) Asia" (archiereus tes Asias), whose ritual office is also linked to the imperial cult in selected cities in numerous inscriptions, is disputed. While most scholars take the traditional view that Asiarch and archiereus are two names for the same office, some researchers assume that the Asiarchs, unlike the high priests, held a local office. High priests were often related to another.

Equivalents are known in other Roman provinces, e.g. Macedoniarch, Bithyniarch, Galatiarch and Lyciarch.
