= Articuleia gens =

Roman gens

The gens Articuleia was a Roman family who achieved prominence during the early Roman Empire. The gens is known chiefly from its two members who held the consulate.

- Quintus Articuleius Paetus, suffect consul in AD 78 and ordinary consul in 101.
- Quintus Articuleius Paetinus, ordinary consul in 123.

== See also ==
- List of Roman gentes
