= Lucius Norbanus Balbus =

1st-century Roman senator and consul

Lucius Norbanus Balbus was a Roman senator during the Principate. He was consul in AD 19, as the colleague of Marcus Junius Silanus Torquatus. Balbus was the younger son of Gaius Norbanus Flaccus; his brother was the consul of AD 15, Gaius Norbanus Flaccus.

According to Ronald Syme, Balbus is known only from a single anecdote from Cassius Dio (LVII.18.3), yet in it he "comes to life." Dio describes Balbus as a keen trumpeter; at dawn on his first day as consul he began to play his trumpet, terrifying the populace who had believed the year to be announced with fateful omens.

Josephus mentions a Norbanus, a nobleman of great bodily strength, who was killed by the German bodyguards when Caligula was assassinated (Antiquities of the Jews, XVIII, 123). Edmund Groag argues he was Balbus; if so, then Balbus died in January 41. However Syme points out this Norbanus might be the son of Balbus or his older brother.

Political offices
Preceded by Gaius Rubellius Blandus, and Marcus Vipstanus Gallus as suffect consuls	Consul of the Roman Empire; 19 with Marcus Junius Silanus Torquatus	Succeeded by Marcus Valerius Messala, and Marcus Aurelius Cotta Maximus Messalinus as ordinary consuls
