= Aulus Bucius Lappius Maximus =

1st century Roman senator, consul and governor

Aulus Bucius Lappius Maximus was a Roman senator who flourished during the Flavian dynasty; Brian W. Jones considers him one of Domitian's amici or advisors. He held the consulate twice.

== Name and family ==
Older authorities refer to him as Lucius Appius Maximus Norbanus, combining Pliny the Younger's mention of him ("Lappius Maximus") with a garbled passage from the Epitome de Caesaribus ("Norbanus Lappius") where his name is combined with the name of the governor of Raetia, Titus Flavius Norbanus. Although his correct name is provided by a military diploma from Suhozem in Bulgaria, some authorities persisted in giving the wrong name.

The polyonymy of his name indicates an adoption; according to Olli Salomies, he was born a Lappius Maximus adopted by an Aulus Bucius. Salomies also notes that "all A. Lappii seem to have something to do with the senator". Ronald Syme notes the gentilicium "'Lappius' is very rare."

An inscription at Rome provides the name of his wife, Aelia. Salomies writes that Lappia A.f. Tertulla, mentioned in a Roman inscription (CIL VI, 31106) "is probably this man's daughter". In any case, Syme notes Lappius Maximus was one of several notables living during the Flavian dynasty who "were unable to supply consular descendants."

== Career ==
The career of Lappius Maximus included being proconsular governor of Bithynia et Pontus during 83/84 prior to being consul for the first time for the nundinium September to December 86 with Gaius Octavius Tidius Tossianus Lucius Javolenus Priscus as his colleague. Then he was consular legate of Germania Inferior during 87 to 89, during which time he assisted in crushing the revolt of Lucius Antonius Saturninus in the adjacent province of Germania Superior. Afterwards he was immediately assigned to the consular legateship of Syria from 89 to 92, before holding the fasces a second time for the nundinium May to August 95 with Publius Ducenius Verus as his colleague; occupying the office of consul was a distinction Syme notes "that had become preternaturally rare in the course of the previous century."

Political offices
Preceded by Sextus Octavius Fronto, and Tiberius Julius Candidus Marius Celsus as Suffect consuls	Suffect consul of the Roman Empire; 86 with Gaius Octavius Tidius Tossianus Lucius Javolenus Priscus	Succeeded by Domitian XIII, and Lucius Volusius Saturninus as Ordinary consuls
Preceded by Lucius Neratius Marcellus, and Titus Flavius Clemens as Ordinary consuls	Suffect consul of the Roman Empire; 95 with Publius Ducenius Verus	Succeeded by Quintus Pomponius Rufus, and Lucius Baebius Tullus as Suffect consuls
