= Asia (Roman province) =

Roman province located in modern-day Turkey and Greece

Provincia Asia ἐπαρχία Ἀσίας
- Province of the Roman Empire
- 133 BC – 7th century
- The province of Asia highlighted within the Roman Empire.
- Capital: Pergamon (modern Bergama, Turkey), later moved to Ephesus (modern Selçuk, Turkey)
- Historical era: Classical Antiquity - Late Antiquity
  - Conquest of Pergamon: 133 BC
  - Division by Diocletian: c. 293
  - Anatolic Theme established: 7th century
Preceded by
Attalid kingdom
Succeeded by
Anatolic Theme
Thracesian Theme
Aegean Sea (theme)
Samos (theme)
Opsikion
- Today part of: Turkey; Greece

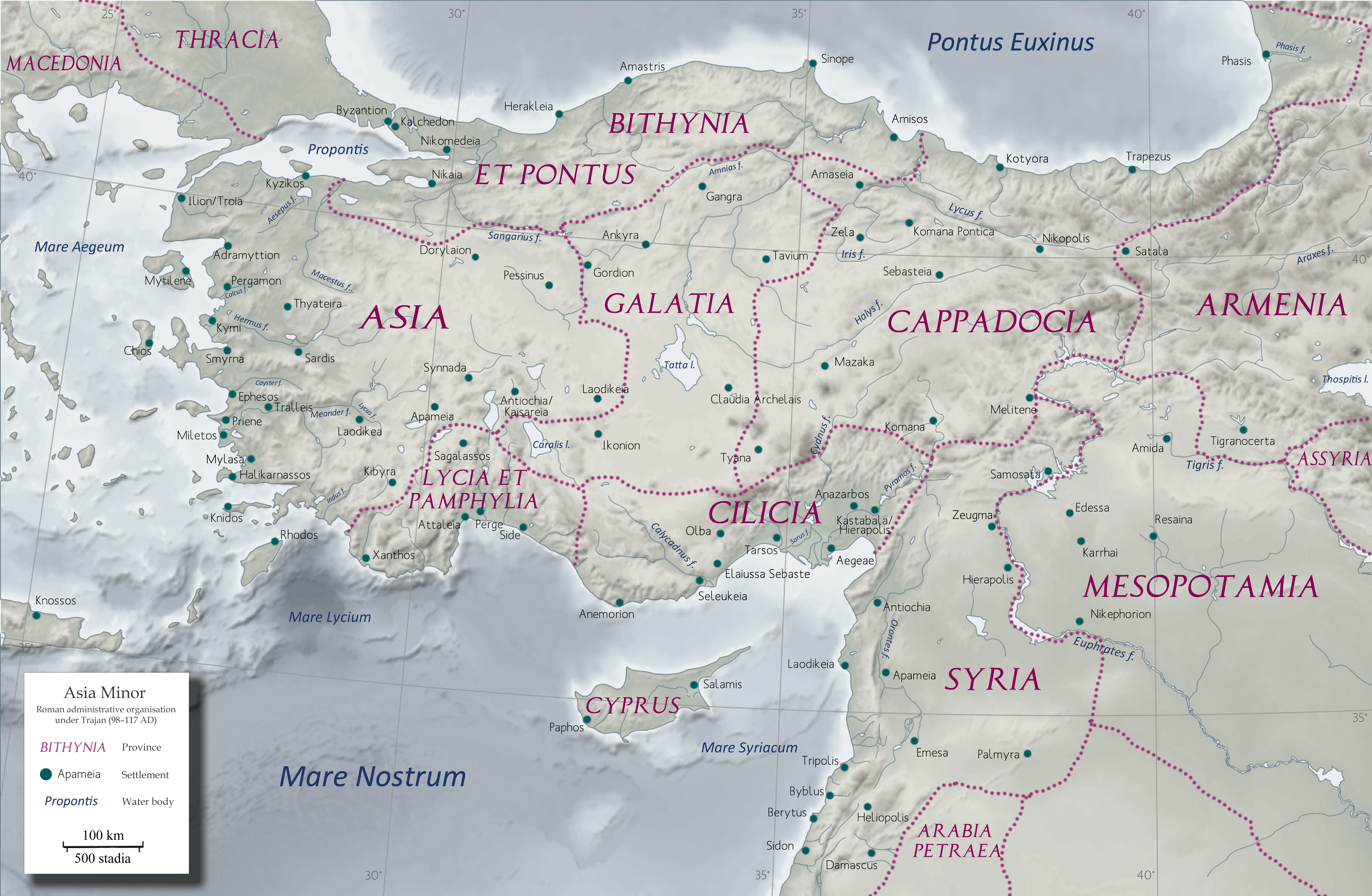
The Roman provinces of Anatolia under Trajan, including Asia.

The Roman Empire in the time of Hadrian (ruled 117–138 AD), showing, in western Anatolia, the senatorial province of Asia (southwestern Turkey).

Asia (Ancient Greek: Ἀσία) was a Roman province covering most of western Asia Minor (Anatolia, Turkey), which was created following the Roman Republic's annexation of the Attalid Kingdom in 133 BC. After the establishment of the Roman Empire by Augustus, it was the most prestigious senatorial province and was governed by a proconsul. That arrangement endured until the province was subdivided in the fourth century AD.

The province was one of the richest of the Empire and was at peace for most of the Imperial period. It contained hundreds of largely self-governing Greek city-states, who competed fiercely with one another for status, through appeals to the Imperial authorities and the cultivation of prestigious cultural institutions such as festival games, religious cults, and oratory.

== Geography ==
The province of Asia originally consisted of the territories of Mysia, the Troad, Aeolis, Lydia, Ionia, Caria, and the land corridor through Pisidia to Pamphylia. The Aegean islands, with the exception of Crete, were part of the province of Asia. The western part of Phrygia was added to Asia in 116 BC. Lycaonia was added before 100 BC, while the area around Cibyra was added in 82 BC. The southeast region of Asia province was later reassigned to the province of Cilicia. During the Empire, the province of Asia was bounded by Bithynia to the north, Lycia to the south, and Galatia to the east.

== History ==
=== Background ===
The word "Asia" comes from the Greek word Ἀσία, originally only applied to the eastern shore of the Aegean Sea, which is attested in Mycenaean Greek texts as aswia and probably derives from Assuwa, the name of the region in the Bronze Age. After the Greco-Persian Wars of the early 5th century BC, Greek sources often use it to refer to the whole continent.

The territory was ruled by various Macedonian kingdoms following the conquests of Alexander the Great. In 190 BC, the Romans crushed Antiochus III the Great at the battle of Magnesia. In the subsequent Treaty of Apamea (188 BC), he surrendered the entire territory to the Romans, who placed most of it under the control of the Attalid dynasty based at Pergamum. The western part of Phrygia was given to Mithridates V, King of Pontus, while Caria and Lycia were given to Rhodes.

=== Annexation ===
With no legitimate heir, King Attalus III of Pergamum, having been a close ally of Rome, chose to bequeath his kingdom to Rome. Upon his death in 133 BC, the pretender Eumenes III staged a rebellion. He defeated one of the consuls of 131 BC, Crassus Mucianus. The following year, the consul Marcus Perperna brought the war to a close by defeating Eumenes in the first engagement. He followed up his victory by laying siege to Stratonikeia, where Eumenes had fled. The town was compelled by famine to surrender and the pretender fell into the consul's hands. Manius Aquillius formally established the region as the province of Asia. The bequest of the Attalid kingdom to Rome presented serious implications for neighbouring territories. It was during this period that the Kingdom of Pontus rose in status under the rule of Mithridates VI. He would prove to be a formidable foe to Rome's success in Asia and beyond.

=== Mithridates and Sulla ===
By 88 BC, Mithridates VI of Pontus had conquered virtually all of Asia. Capitalizing on the hatred of corrupt Roman practices, Mithridates instigated a mass revolt against Rome, ordering the slaughter of all Romans and Italians in the province. Contemporary estimates of casualties ranged from 80,000 up to 150,000.

Three years later, Lucius Cornelius Sulla defeated Mithridates in the First Mithridatic War and in 85 BC reorganized the province into eleven assize districts, each central to a number of smaller, subordinate cities. These assize centers, which developed into the Roman dioceses, included Ephesus, Pergamum - the old Attalid capital, Smyrna, Adramyttium, Cyzicus, Synnada, Apamea, Miletus, and Halicarnassus. The first three cities - Ephesus, Pergamum, and Smyrna - competed to be the dominant city-state in Asia province. Age-old inter-city rivalry continued to inhibit any sort of progress towards provincial unity.

=== Augustus ===
After Augustus came to power, he established a proconsulship for the province of Asia, embracing the regions of Mysia, Lydia, Caria, and Phrygia. To its east, the province of Galatia was established. The proconsul spent much of his year-long term traveling throughout the province hearing cases and conducting other judicial business at each of the assize centers. Rome's transition from the Republic to the early Empire saw an important change in the role of existing provincial cities, which evolved from autonomous city-states to Imperial administrative centers.

The beginning of the principate of Augustus also signaled the rise of new cities in Mysia, Lydia and Phrygia. The province grew to be an elaborate system of self-governing cities, each responsible for its own economics, taxes, and law in its territory. The reign of Augustus further signaled the start of urbanization of Asia province, as public building became the defining characteristic of a city.

=== Decline ===
The 3rd century AD marked a serious decline in Asia stemming in part from epidemic disease, beginning with the Antonine plague, the indiscipline of local soldiers and also the diminishing instances of voluntary civic generosity. The Gothic invasions of the 250s and 260s, part of the Crisis of the Third Century, contributed to failing feelings of security. Furthermore, as political and strategic emphasis shifted away from Asia proconsularis, it lost much of its former prominence.

In the 4th century, Diocletian divided Asia province into seven smaller provinces. During the 5th century and, until the mid-6th century the cities and provinces of western Anatolia experienced an economic renaissance. But after the great plague of 543 many cities towards the interior of the province declined to the point where they were indistinguishable from common villages by the time of the Persian and Arab invasions of the 7th century. On the other hand, leading cities from the early empire including Ephesus, Sardis, and Aphrodisias retained much of their former glory and came to serve as the new provincial capitals. Asia remained a center of the dominant Hellenistic culture in the east for centuries. The territory remained part of the (Eastern) Roman Empire until the end of the 14th century when it was conquered by the Ottoman Empire.

== Government ==
=== Taxation ===
Rome had always been very reluctant to involve itself in matters to the east. It typically relied on allies to arbitrate in the case of a conflict. Very rarely would Rome send delegations to the east, much less have a strong governmental presence. This apathy did not change much even after the gift from Attalus in 133 BC. In fact, parts of the Pergamene kingdom were voluntarily relinquished to different nations. For example, Great Phrygia was given to Mithridates V of Pontus.

While the Senate was hesitant in involving itself in Asian affairs, others had no such reluctance. A law passed by Gaius Gracchus in 123 BC gave the right to collect taxes in Asia to members of the equestrian order. The privilege of collecting taxes was almost certainly exploited by individuals from the Republic.

In case a community was unable to pay taxes, they borrowed from Roman lenders but at exorbitant rates. This more often than not resulted in default on said loans and consequently led Roman lenders to seize the borrower's land, their last remaining asset of value. In this way and by outright purchase, Romans dispersed throughout the province of Asia.

=== Military presence ===
Other than to quell occasional revolts, there was minimal military presence in Asia province, until forces led by Sulla set forth in their campaign against Mithridates VI. In fact, Asia province was unique in that it was one of the few ungarrisoned provinces of the empire. While no full legions were ever stationed inside the province, that is not to say that there was no military presence whatsoever.

Legionary detachments were present in the Phrygian cities of Apamea and Amorium. Auxiliary cohorts were stationed in Phrygian Eumeneia while smaller groups of soldiers regularly patrolled the mountainous regions. High military presence in rural regions around 3rd century AD caused great civil unrest in the province.

== Imperial cult ==
Imperial cult was prevalent in provincial communities during the Roman empire. Soon after Augustus came to power, temples erected in his honor sprang up across Asia province. The establishment of provincial centers of imperial cult further spawned local cults. These sites served as models followed by other provinces throughout the empire.

Imperial cult served as a way for subjects of Asia province to come to terms with imperial rule within the framework of their communities. Religious practices were very much a public affair and involved citizens in all its aspects including prayer, sacrifice, and processions. Rituals held in honor of a particular emperor frequently outnumbered those of other gods. No other cult matched the imperial cult in terms of dispersion and commonality.

== See also ==
- List of Roman governors of Asia
- Early centers of Christianity#Anatolia
- Asiarch
