= Nundinium =

Period of consulship in the Roman Empire

Nundinium was a Latin word derived from the word nundinum, which referred to the cycle of days observed by the Romans. During the Roman Empire, nundinium came to mean the duration of a single consulship among several in a calendar year.

== Sources ==
- Historia Augusta, Vita Alexander, 28, 43; Vita Tacitus, 9
- Theodor Mommsen, Abriss des römischen Staatsrechts (Leipzig 1893), Vol 2, p. 84; Vol. 3, p. 375
