= Statilia gens =

Ancient Roman family

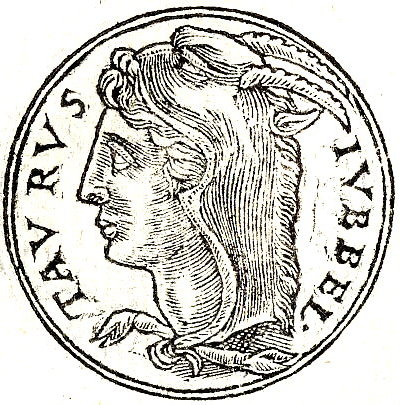
Titus Statilius Taurus, consul in 37 and 26 BC, from Promptuarii Iconum Insigniorum, by Guillaume Rouille (1518?-1589).

The gens Statilia was a plebeian family of Lucanian origin at ancient Rome. Members of this gens are first mentioned in the third century BC, when one of them led the Lucanian assault on the city of Thurii, and another commanded an allied cavalry troop during the Second Punic War; but at Rome the Statilii first come to attention in the time of Cicero, at which point they held equestrian rank. The first of the family to attain the consulship was Titus Statilius Taurus in 37 BC, and his descendants continued to fill the highest offices of the Roman state until the time of Marcus Aurelius.

== Origin ==
The nomen Statilius belongs to a class of gentilicia ending in the suffix -ilius, derived from other names ending in the diminutive suffix -ulus. Statilius is a derivative of the common Oscan praenomen Statius, the diminutive of which may have been Statulus. The same praenomen also gave rise to the Statia gens.

== Praenomina ==
The earliest Statilii bore common Oscan praenomina, such as Sthenius (or Statius) and Marius. In the late Republic, we find Lucius and Quintus, both among the most common praenomina throughout all periods of Roman history. The consular families from the first centuries of the Empire used Titus to the exclusion of all other regular praenomina, although two of the Statilii Tauri exchanged their original praenomina for the names Sisenna and Taurus. In the case of Taurus, the name was simply the cognomen of the family used as a praenomen, while Sisenna commemorated the descent of the family from the Cornelii Sisennae, a noble family of the Republic, through a female line.

== Branches and cognomina ==
The most important branch of the Statilii bore the cognomen Taurus, referring to a bull, and belonging to a large class of surnames derived from the names of animals and everyday objects. This family remained prominent from the end of the Republic to the reign of Claudius, and its name appears on coins of the era.

Corvinus, borne as a surname by one of the consular Statilii, was inherited from his grandfather, Marcus Valerius Messalla Corvinus, consul in 31 BC, a descendant of the illustrious house of the Valerii Messallae, and of Marcus Valerius Corvus, who obtained his cognomen when, as a young soldier, he defeated a giant Gaul in single combat, with the apparently divine intervention of a raven, or corvus.

A later family of the Statilii bore the cognomina Maximus and Severus, both common surnames throughout Roman history. Titus Statilius Maximus Severus Hadrianus, consul in AD 115, was the descendant of wealthy Syrian colonists. Maximus, the superlative of Magnus, "great", could have described someone of great stature or high achievement, but was more often used to designate the eldest of several brothers. Severus was used to describe someone whose manner was "stern" or "serious".

== Members ==
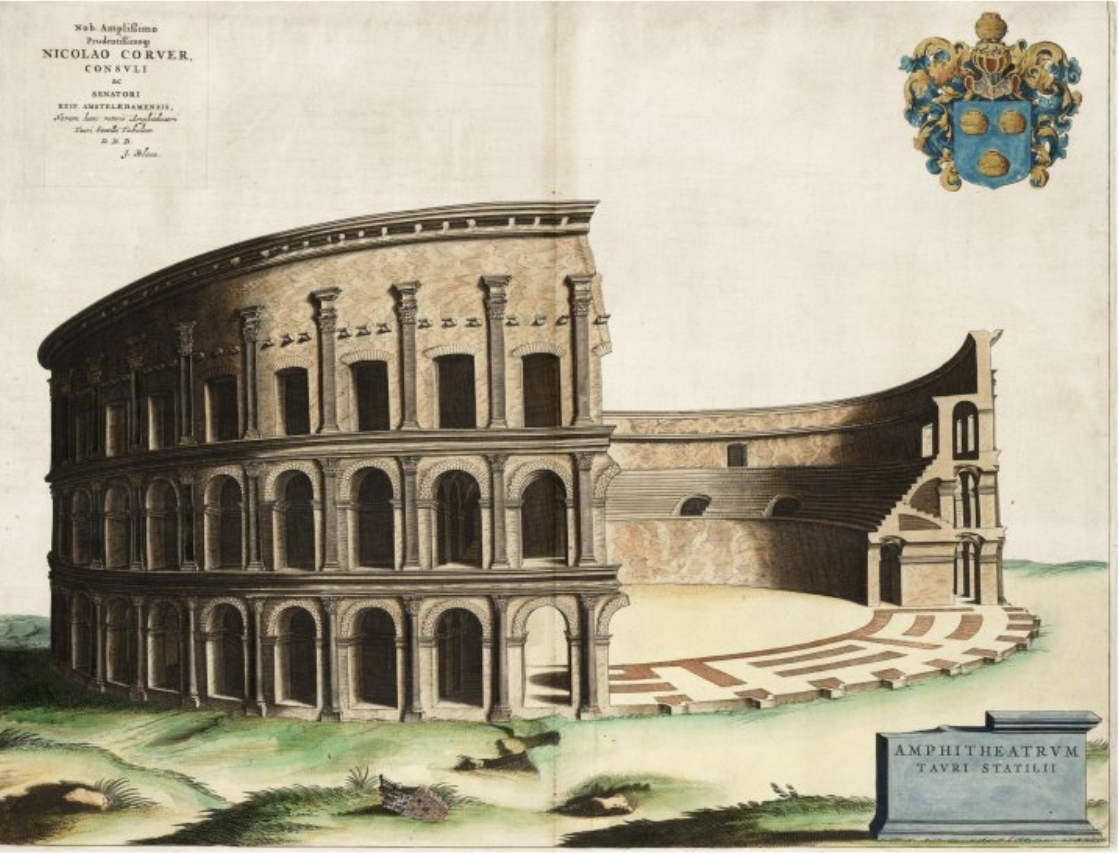
Titus Statilius Taurus built the first stone amphitheatre built at Rome. It stood from 30 BC to the Great Fire in AD 64.

This list includes abbreviated praenomina. For an explanation of this practice, see filiation.

- Sthenius or Statius Statilius, (Note: Sthenius (or Stenius) in Pliny, Statius in Valerius Maximus. Both were regular Oscan praenomina.) the leader of the Lucanians against Thurii early in the third century BC. At Rome, the tribune of the plebs Gaius Aelius passed a measure condemning Statilius, for which he was honoured by the Thurians.
- Marius Statilius, the leader of a Lucanian cavalry troop, serving under the consul Lucius Aemilius Paullus in 216 BC, during the Second Punic War. After Paullus and his army were destroyed at the Battle of Cannae, Statilius questioned his devotion to the Roman cause, until reassured by the praises of Quintus Fabius Maximus.
- Lucius Statilius, an eques, and one of Catiline's conspirators, was imprisoned along with several of his colleagues in the Tullianum, where they were strangled on the orders of Cicero.
- Statilius, an actor of mean ability, with whom Cicero contrasts Quintus Roscius.
- Lucius Statilius, one of the augurs, mentioned by Cicero in 45 BC.
- Statilius, a disciple of Cato the Younger, alongside whom he wished to perish by his own hand during the Civil War. He was saved by his friends, and after the death of Caesar, joined the army of the Liberatores, falling in battle at Philippi.
- Quintus Statilius, was elected tribune of the plebs for 29 BC, but removed from office by Octavian, when he was reducing the numbers of the senate.
- Statilius Capella, an eques from Sabratha in Africa, whose mistress, Flavia Domitilla, became the wife of Vespasian.
- Titus Statilius Crito, better known as Criton of Heraclea, the physician of Trajan, whom he accompanied to Dacia. In addition to works on medicine, cosmetics, and perhaps also cookery, he wrote a history of the Dacians and Getae, known as the Getica, which probably formed part of the basis for Trajan's De Bello Dacico, now lost, along with all of Criton's works, except for fragments and quotations preserved by other writers.
- Statilius Secundus, governor of an uncertain province, received a rescript from the emperor Hadrian, concerning whether and how to punish soldiers whose prisoners had escaped their custody.
- Statilius Cassius Taurinus, inducted into the Arval Brethren in AD 155.
- Statilius Attalus, physician to the emperor Marcus Aurelius.
- Statilius Corfulenus, a senator who proposed honours for the emperor Clodius Albinus, and who was derided in a letter from Septimius Severus for doing so.
- Titus Statilius Barbarus, consul suffectus in AD 198 or 199. He had been a decemvir stlitibus judicandis, quaestor, praetor, and governor of Thracia. After his consulship, he was governor of Germania Superior.
- Titus Statilius Silianus, a member of the Arval Brethren during the early third century.
- Statilius Ammianus, governor of Roman Egypt AD 271–273.
- Statilius Flaccus, the author of several epigrams in the Greek Anthology.
- Statilius Maximus, a grammarian, and the author of De Singularibus apud Ciceronem, together with commentaries on Cato and Sallust. His work is repeatedly quoted by Charisius.

=== Statilii Tauri ===
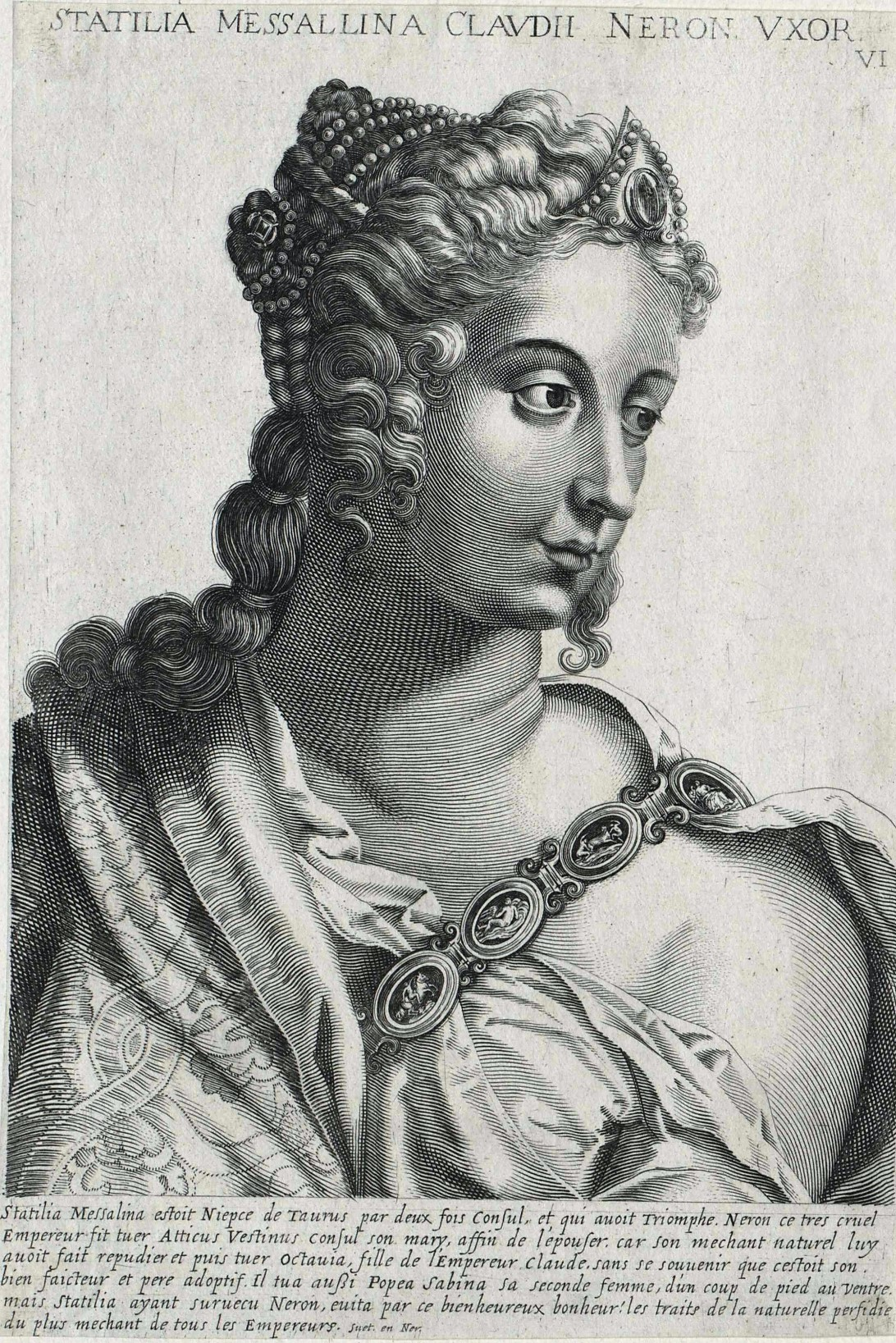
Statilia Messalina, Roman Empress from AD 66 to 68. 17th century woodcut, unknown artist.

- Titus Statilius T. f. Taurus, consul suffectus in 37 BC, afterward commanded Antony's fleet in the war against Sextus Pompeius. After securing Africa, he was granted a triumph in 34. He led Octavian's army at the Battle of Actium in 31, and held the consulship a second time in 26. He was Praefectus Urbi in 16 BC. He built the first stone amphitheatre at Rome, which stood from 30 BC until the Great Fire in AD 64.
- Titus Statilius T. f. T. n. Taurus, triumvir monetalis at an uncertain date, died before achieving higher office.
- Titus Statilius T. f. T. n. Taurus, consul in AD 11.
- Statilia T. f. T. n., daughter of Titus Statilius Taurus, the consul of 37 and 26 BC, married Lucius Calpurnius Piso, consul in 1 BC. She is probably the Statilia who reportedly reached the age of ninety-nine, and died during the reign of Claudius.
- Titus Statilius T. f. T. n. Sisenna Taurus, or Sisenna Statilius Taurus, consul in AD 16. He was a member of the College of Pontiffs, and when at Rome, lived in the house once owned by Cicero, and originally built for Marcus Livius Drusus on the Palatine Hill.
- Titus Statilius T. f. T. n. Taurus, consul in AD 44, and proconsul of Africa from AD 51 to 53. At the instigation of Agrippina, he was accused, apparently without evidence, of extortion and divination, and took his own life rather than face what he believed would be inevitable condemnation. He was the builder of the Horti Tauriani.
- Titus Statilius T. f. T. n. Statilius Corvinus, also known as Taurus Statilius Corvinus, was consul in AD 45. The following year, he was among those who conspired against the emperor Claudius. He may have been put to death, but his fate is uncertain; some of the conspirators were exiled.
- Statilia T. f. T. n. Corvinus, the sister of Corvinus.
- Statilia T. f. T. n. Messalina, probably the daughter or niece of the consul Corvinus, her first husband was Marcus Julius Vestinus Atticus, consul in AD 65, whose destruction Nero wrought because not because of any wrongdoing, but because Atticus was too astute to be deceived by the emperor. Messalina became Nero's mistress, and then his third wife, after the death of Poppaea Sabina. Messalina was one of the few who survived the downfall of Nero. Otho, who had lost his wife to Nero, promised to marry her, but he fell in the year of the four emperors.
- Titus Statilius T. f. Taurus, mentioned in several inscriptions dating around AD 140, appears to have been a military tribune in the Legio XXII Primigenia, and was buried at Mogontiacum in Germania Superior, aged thirty-six, with a monument from his freedman, Statilius Fortunatus.

=== Statilii Optati ===
- Titus Statilius T. l. Optatus, a freedman buried at Rome during the first half of the first century, aged twenty-six, was probably part of the household of Titus Statilius Taurus Corvinus, since a Corvinus is mentioned in the same inscription.
- Titus Statilius Optatus, praefectus annonae in the late first or early second century, had been a military tribune with the Legio VI Victrix and the Legio VI Ferrata, and prefect in charge of the census in Britain and Gaul.
- Statilius T. f. Homullus, the elder son of Titus Statilius Optatus, who along with his brother, Optatus, dedicated a late first- or early second-century monument at Rome to their father.
- Statilius T. f. Optatus, the younger son of Titus Statilius Optatus, joined with his brother, Homullus, in dedicating a monument to their father.

=== Statilii Maximi et Severi ===
- Titus Statilius Maximus Severus Hadrianus, governor of Thracia from AD 112 to 115, and consul suffectus from February to April, 115, replacing Marcus Pedo Vergilianus, who was killed in an earthquake at Antioch.
- Titus Statilius T. f. Maximus, consul in AD 144, and governor of Asia from 157 to 158.
- Titus Statilius Julius Severus, or Lucius Julius Statilius Severus, consul in an uncertain year, was governor of Moesia Inferior from AD 159 to 160.
- Titus Statilius Severus, consul in AD 171.

== See also ==
- List of Roman gentes

== Bibliography ==
- Marcus Tullius Cicero, Epistulae ad Atticum, In Catilinam, Pro Quinto Roscio Comoedo.
- Gaius Sallustius Crispus (Sallust), Bellum Catilinae (The Conspiracy of Catiline).
- Dionysius of Halicarnassus, Romaike Archaiologia.
- Titus Livius (Livy), History of Rome.
- Marcus Velleius Paterculus, Roman History.
- Valerius Maximus, Factorum ac Dictorum Memorabilium (Memorable Facts and Sayings).
- Lucius Annaeus Seneca (Seneca the Younger), Epistulae Morales ad Lucilium (Moral Letters to Lucilius).
- Gaius Plinius Secundus (Pliny the Elder), Historia Naturalis (Natural History).
- Sextus Julius Frontinus, Strategemata (Stratagems).
- Publius Cornelius Tacitus, Annales.
- Lucius Mestrius Plutarchus (Plutarch), Lives of the Noble Greeks and Romans.
- Gaius Suetonius Tranquillus, De Vita Caesarum (Lives of the Caesars, or The Twelve Caesars).
- Phlegon of Tralles, Peri Thaumasion (The Book of Marvels).
- Appianus Alexandrinus (Appian), Bellum Civile (The Civil War), Bella Illyrica (The Illyrian Wars).
- Aelius Galenus (Galen), De Compositione Medicamentorum Secundum Locos Conscriptorum (On the Composition of Medications According to the Place Prescribed), De Compositione Medicamentorum per Genera (On the Composition of Medications According to their Kind).
- Lucius Cassius Dio Cocceianus (Cassius Dio), Roman History.
- Aelius Lampridius, Aelius Spartianus, Flavius Vopiscus, Julius Capitolinus, Trebellius Pollio, and Vulcatius Gallicanus, Historia Augusta (Lives of the Emperors).
- Flavius Sosipater Charisius, Ars Grammatica (The Art of Grammar).
- Digesta, or Pandectae (The Digest).
- Johann Albert Fabricius, Bibliotheca Graeca, sive Notitia Scriptorum Veterum Graecorum (The Greek Library, or Knowledge of Ancient Greek Writers), Christian Liebezeit & Theodor Christoph Felginer, Hamburg (1718).
- Analecta Veterum Poetarum Graecorum (Fragments by Ancient Greek Poets), Richard François Philippe Brunck, ed., Bauer and Treuttel, Strasbourg (1772–1776).
- Anthologia Graeca sive Poetarum Graecorum Lusus, ex Recensione Brunckii (The Greek Anthology, or Works of the Greek Poets, or the Collection of Brunck), Friedrich Jacobs, ed., Dyck, Leipzig (1794).
- Dictionary of Greek and Roman Biography and Mythology, William Smith, ed., Little, Brown and Company, Boston (1849).
- Theodor Mommsen et alii, Corpus Inscriptionum Latinarum (The Body of Latin Inscriptions, abbreviated CIL), Berlin-Brandenburgische Akademie der Wissenschaften (1853–present).
- René Cagnat et alii, L'Année épigraphique (The Year in Epigraphy, abbreviated AE), Presses Universitaires de France (1888–present).
- George Davis Chase, "The Origin of Roman Praenomina", in Harvard Studies in Classical Philology, vol. VIII, pp. 103–184 (1897).
- Paul von Rohden, Elimar Klebs, & Hermann Dessau, Prosopographia Imperii Romani (The Prosopography of the Roman Empire, abbreviated PIR), Berlin (1898).
- T. Robert S. Broughton, The Magistrates of the Roman Republic, American Philological Association (1952–1986).
- Géza Alföldy, Konsulat und Senatorenstand unter der Antonien (The Consulate and Senatorial State under the Antonines), Rudolf Habelt, Bonn (1977).
- Werner Eck, "Jahres- und Provinzialfasten der senatorischen Statthalter von 69/70 bis 138/139" (Annual and Provincial Fasti of the Senatorial Governors from AD 69/70 to 138/139), in Chiron, vol. 12 (1982).
- Paul M. M. Leunissen, Konsuln und Konsulare in der Zeit von Commodus bis Severus Alexander (Consuls and Consulars from the Time of Commodus to Severus Alexander), Brill (1989).
