= Decimus Terentius Gentianus =

2nd century Roman senator, general and suffect consul

Decimus Terentius Gentianus Gnaeus Minicius Faustinus was a Roman senator of the 2nd century AD, who was one of the Emperor Trajan's chief generals. He participated as a junior officer in Trajan's Second Dacian War, and as a general in Trajan's Parthian War. He fell victim to Emperor Hadrian's notorious suspicious character, and was executed. He served as suffect consul in 116 with Lucius Co[...] as his colleague.

== Sources and Chronology ==
Compared to his contemporaries, Gentianus' life is surprisingly well documented. His name not only appears on several inscriptions, but he is mentioned in the Historia Augusta, as well as being the recipient of a rescript from Hadrian. However, until recently most of our information about Gentianus centered on his final years, leaving his life prior to his consulate extremely skeletal: information about his cursus honorum was known solely from an inscription in Sarmizegetusa that provided minimal, and at one point misleading, details.. However, in 2021 professor Lyudmil Vagalinski, lead archaeologist of the excavations of Heraclea Sintica near the modern day town of Petrich in Bulgaria, discovered a marble slab (height 55 cm, width 81 cm, depth 12 cm), containing 19 rows of text written in Ancient Greek; Nikolay Sharankov of Sofia University has subsequently provided a translation. This inscription provided the reconstruction of a much fuller biography for Gentianus, which also included a number of noteworthy details.

The chronology of Gentianus' life is complicated by the language in the poem of Gentianus' sister, Terentia, lustra(que) sex intra, "within thirty years". Experts have interpreted these words to mean that Gentianus achieved the offices mentioned in his cursus honorum by the age of thirty which leads to bizarre conclusions that he acceded to the consulate by the age of 28, an age only members of the imperial family held the consulate at this time. These conclusions can be avoided if instead of interpreting these words to refer to his age, but to the length of his career in imperial service: assuming he was appointed to the vigintiviri at 18, this would indicate he lived to at least the age of 48, providing enough space for him to accede to the consulship at 42.

== Life and career ==
Ronald Syme has asserted he was the son of Decimus Terentius Scaurianus, one of Trajan's generals; if so, his origins may be in Gallia Narbonensis. The Sarmizegetusa inscription provides a second part to Gentianus' name: Gnaeus Minicius Faustinus. As this element is identical to the suffect consul of AD 91, there is some connection between Gentianus and Faustinus. As Nicolay Sharankov notes, this was due to Faustinus being a relative on his mother's side, or "if we assume that Gentianus was adopted by Terentius Scaurianus -- was his original name before the adoption."

The Sarmizegetusa inscription is also the fullest account of Gentianus' career, so it will be used here. His first recorded office is as a member of the quattuorviri viarum curandarum, the board of four magistrates overseeing road maintenance within the city of Rome. It was one of the four boards that formed the vigintiviri, and membership in one of these four boards was a preliminary and required first step towards entry to the Roman Senate. It was usually held at the age of 18.

Next, according to the inscription, Gentianus was commissioned tribunus laticlavius, or military tribune, three times: with Legio XI Claudia, which was stationed in Moesia; Legio VIII Augusta in Germania Superior; and with Legio I Minervia, during which time Gentianus was awarded dona militaria for his service in Trajan's Second Dacian War in the form of two coronae, two hostae, and two vexilla. According to Valerie Maxfield, these dona were appropriate to soldiers of the rank of tribune. The number of commissions Gentianus received is highly unusual: Anthony Birley documented only two other examples of a person receiving this commission three times, one of whom was the future emperor Hadrian. This suggestion of imperial favor is only confirmed by the fact the first major magistracy he held, quaestor, was in service to emperor Trajan himself.

The conjunction of these offices held so close together -- the vigintiviri, three military tribuneships, quaestor -- raises a problem. Gentianus was 18 when he held the first office; tenure as a military tribune usually ran longer than one year, and at least two; and the office of quaestor was according to the lex annales, after the reforms of Augustus, held at age 25. It would be difficult to squeeze all of these in the seven years between 18 and 25. There are several possible explanations here. The one Nicolay Sharankov tacitly assumes is that Gentianus held each of his tenures as military tribune in connection with the Dacian War, effectively simultaneously. Either after serving as quaestor, or as part of his duties, Gentianus was then appointed dilectator in Africa, or tasked with military recruitment in that province. Sharankov explains that this appointment was either to replace losses suffered in Trajan's Second Dacian War, or in connection with Trajan's creation of two new legions, II Traiana and XXX Ulpia.

Mention of the Second Dacian War and the creation of these two legions ought to provide useful points to anchor the dates of Gentianus' life; unfortunately they do not. While the Second Dacian War is known to have taken place from AD 104 to 105, the exact date of creation for the two legions is still unknown. The earliest attestation for either legion is 115: H.M.D. Parker mentions the recorded cursus honorum of Numisius Sabinus, where it is clear he was commander of Legio II Traiana between 109 and 114; the first certain attestation of Legio XXX Ulpia is to between 115 and 117. Until further evidence is recovered, Sharankov's guess that Gentianus was quaestor around AD 107 is most likely correct.

Upon his return from Africa, Gentianus was appointed plebeian tribune. Sharankov notes this was another sign of his imperial favor. This was followed by his appointment to praetor. Although Sharankov states he held this at the age of 25, Roman law prevented him from holding this office until one reached the age of 30. In either case, Gentianus was praetor in 112 as Sharankov notes.

Until the recovery of the Heracles Sintica inscription, the wording of the Sarmizegetusa inscription (leg(ato) Aug(usti)) was understood to mean Gentianus had been governor (legatus pro praetore) of an unnamed province; however, with the newly recovered inscription, we correctly understand the language was meant to refer to his commission as commander (legatus legionis) of two legions, Legio II Traiana Fortis and Legio II Adiutrix. While II Traiana was based in Syria and II Adiutrix in Pannonia Inferior, Sharankov makes the reasonable explanation that once II Adiutrix had been transferred to east to participate in Trajan's Parthian War, Gentianus had been transferred to take command of that legion. For his actions in this conflict, Trajan awarded him further dona militaria -- four coronae, four hostae, and four vexilla, which Maxfield notes was appropriate for a consul. Based on Trajan's adoption of the surname Parthicus in connection with this award, Sharankov dates the award after 20 February 116.

This was the point where Gentianus was made Suffect Consul, for the period July through September 116. Based on his involvement in the Parthian War, we can safely conclude that Gentianus held this office in absentia. Upon returning to Rome, both the Sarmizegetusa and Heraclea Sintica inscriptions attest that Gentianus was admitted to the College of Pontiffs, one of the most respected colleges of Roman priests.

The Heraclea Sintica inscription reports a previously unknown office for Gentianus, curator operum publicorum, or overseer of public buildings in Rome. Sharankov notes that this appointment indicates Gentianus remained in Rome for an extended period.

The last recorded office for Gentianus was as censitor for the public province of Macedonia. Sharankov notes that this is "the best documented office of Gentianus." Sharankov believes he did not assume this office until the year 117. The last documented act of Gentianus involved his intervention in a boundary dispute in Macedonia. He queried the emperor Hadrian concerning the appropriate punishments for moving a boundary stone. Hadrian issued to him a rescript written 17 August 119, stating that any such punishment should depend on the social rank of the offender: a person of standing obviously moved the stone to grab his neighbor's land, and should be banished; servants should receive two years' hard labor, although if the stone was moved through ignorance, a beating would suffice. Although there is no record of the outcome of this case, tangible evidence of this case exists in the form of an inscription recovered from Pelagonia (near modern Vitolište, North Macedonia) dated to 120, which not only bore Gentianus' name, but that of a soldier from Legio I Minervia, Claudianus Maximus.

=== Death ===
More information is available about his death. According to the Historia Augusta, during the reign of Hadrian, Gentianus had become highly esteemed by his fellow Senators. In spite of this, or because of it, towards the end of his reign Hadrian came to dislike him, although the emperor had considered making Gentianus his successor. The Historia Augusta strongly implies that Terentius Gentianus was one of several put to death "either openly or by craft".

We have no firm evidence for the date of Gentianus' death. In the 14th century was seen the first six lines of a poem inscribed on one of the Pyramids of Giza, addressed to "a most sweet brother" named "Decimus Gentianus". Hermann Dessau, and others after him, identify that person with this Gentianus which would make the poetess his sister, Terentia. According to Anthony Birley, she was married to Lucius Lollianus Avitus; he speculates that Terentia and her husband joined the imperial entourage at Ephesus in 129 and traveled with them to Roman Egypt. "It is difficult to find an occasion otherwise when persons of senatorial rank — normally barred from entering Egypt — could have gone there, if not in the imperial entourage." He concludes that it is plausible that she had recently heard news of her brother's death, which was the occasion for her poem.

== Terentia Inscription ==
The referral to Gentianus on a bygone Latin inscription on the Great Pyramid of Khufu at Giza, immortalised in 1335 by a German pilgrim, Wilhelm von Boldensele, is widely agreed to have been carved (or likely dictated) by his sister Terentia, who visited Egypt some time after AD 130 after the Emperor Hadrian's tour of the country, after which Gentianus had died.

The poem read:

I have seen the pyramids, but without you, sweetest brother;
and I have poured out what offering I could — my tears of sorrow.
I incise this lament, too; it carries the memory of our anguish.
Thus on a lofty pyramid there may survive the name
of Decimus Gentianus: priest; companion of Trajan,
at your triumphs; censor, too, and consul, all inside a thirty-year span.

Vidi pyramidas sine te, dulcissime frater,
et tibi, quod potui, lacrimas hic maesta profudi,
et nostri memorem luctus hanc sculpo querelam.
Si<c> nomen Decimi <G>entia<n>i pyramide alta, pontiÀcis comitisque tuis, Traiane, triumphis,
lustra<que> sex intra censoris, consulis, e<x>s<t>e<t>.
(CIL III, 21 and CIL III, 6625 = ILS 1046A = CLE 270)

Though the poem is that of an amateur, Terentia falls into a tradition of Greek and Roman visitors carving inscriptions, sometimes of an epigrammatic nature, onto Egyptian monuments as part of their travels, such as those carved by the likewise learned Roman female visitors Julia Balbilla and Caecilia Trebulla on the Colossi of Memnon in Thebes. Terentia's emotional lament in memory of her deceased brother reflects on the success of his career and is thus a sign of her pietas (piety) to him. Moreover, it is revealing of her erudition as a Roman elite woman. Her wish that her brother could have witnessed the pyramids as she had is a conventional theme found in Greco-Roman tourists' visits to Egyptian monuments, and her style bears witness to her education and culture, containing allusions to the famed verses of Horace, Ovid and, perhaps, Catullus.

Political offices
Preceded by Tiberius Julius Secundus, and Marcus Egnatius Marcellinus as suffect consuls	Consul of the Roman Empire; AD 116 with L. Co[...]	Succeeded by Lucius Statius Aquila, and Gaius Julius Alexander Berenicianus as suffect consuls
