= Lucius Hedius Rufus Lollianus Avitus =

Lucius Hedius Rufus Lollianus Avitus may refer to:

- Lucius Hedius Rufus Lollianus Avitus (consul 114)
- Lucius Hedius Rufus Lollianus Avitus (consul 144)
