= Oscia gens =

The gens Oscia was an obscure plebeian family at Rome. Members of this gens are first mentioned in imperial times, when a few of them appear among the Roman aristocracy. None of them are known to have held any magistracies, but an Oscia Modesta was the wife of a Roman consul during the time of Severus Alexander. A number of Oscii appear in inscriptions.

== Origin ==
The nomen Oscius appears to be derived from the cognomen Oscus, referring to one of the Osci, an Italic people closely related to the Sabines and the Samnites, who gave their name to the Oscan language. This is supported by the fact that some of the Oscii known from inscriptions lived in Sabinum and neighboring parts of Latium, and by the fact that one of the Oscii bore the praenomen Statius, a common name among the Oscan-speaking peoples of Italy.

== Members ==
This list includes abbreviated praenomina. For an explanation of this practice, see filiation.

- Oscia St. f., buried at Rome.
- Marcus Oscius, named in a funerary inscription from Ficulea in Latium.
- Statius Oscius, the father of Oscia.
- Marcus Oscius Dionysius, listed among the soldiers stationed at Rome in AD 70. His commander was the centurion Gnaeus Pompeius Pelas.
- Oscia P. l. Domestica, a freedwoman mentioned in an inscription from Rome.
- Publius Oscius P. l. Faustus, a freedman mentioned in an inscription from Rome.
- Gaius Oscius C. l. Felix, a freedman buried at Trebula Mutusca in Sabinum.
- Oscius Gemellus, probably a homo nobilis under the early Empire.
- Oscia Irene, the wife of Portumius Polytimus, buried at Rome, aged thirty years and twenty days.
- Gaius Oscius C. f. Julianus, a soldier in one of the urban cohorts in AD 197.
- Oscia M. f. Modesta Publiana, (Note: Oscia appears in two inscriptions. In the one from Rome, she is named Oscia M. f. Modesta, one of the two grandmothers of the tribune Honoratus, the other being Cornelia C. f. Publiana. The second inscription, from Thuburbo Maius in Africa Proconsularis, calls her Oscia Publiana. Prosopographia Imperii Romani calls her Oscia Modesta Cornelia Publiana, M. f., with the note that she was probably a descendant of the Cornelii Scipiones. However, the Roman inscription suggests that there has been some confusion between the two grandmothers, which might be understandable if both were named Publiana (suggesting that they may have been related). Alternatively, perhaps the name Publiana has been erroneously assigned to the grandmother Cornelia in the Roman inscription.) the wife of Gaius Arrius Honoratus, consul in an uncertain year during the reign of Severus Alexander. She was the mother of Gaius Arrius Longinus, who probably died in childhood, and the grandmother of Marcus Flavius Arrius Oscius Honoratus, a military tribune.
- Oscia Philete, the wife of Gaius Cominius Felix, buried at Rome.
- Oscia Primigenia, a freedwoman, and the mother of Lucius Apisius Capitolinus, according to a sepulchral inscription from Rome.
- Marcus Oscius M. l. Primigenius, a young freedman buried at Rome, aged fifteen years, eleven months, ten days.
- Oscia Primilla, dedicated a monument at Rome to her son, Marcus Oscius Primus.
- Marcus Oscius Primus, the son of Oscia Primilla, buried at Rome, aged twenty.
- Oscia Sabina, buried at Rome during the second or third century.

== See also ==
- List of Roman gentes

== Bibliography ==
- René Cagnat et alii, L'Année épigraphique (The Year in Epigraphy, abbreviated AE), Presses Universitaires de France (1888–present).
- Theodor Mommsen et alii, Corpus Inscriptionum Latinarum (The Body of Latin Inscriptions, abbreviated CIL), Berlin-Brandenburgische Akademie der Wissenschaften (1853–present).
- Wilhelm Henzen, Ephemeris Epigraphica: Corporis Inscriptionum Latinarum Supplementum (Journal of Inscriptions: Supplement to the Corpus Inscriptionum Latinarum, abbreviated EE), Institute of Roman Archaeology, Rome (1872–1913).
- George Davis Chase, "The Origin of Roman Praenomina", in Harvard Studies in Classical Philology, vol. VIII (1897).
- Paul von Rohden, Elimar Klebs, & Hermann Dessau, Prosopographia Imperii Romani (The Prosopography of the Roman Empire, abbreviated PIR), Berlin (1898).
