= Lucius Caesennius Sospes =

Late 1st/early 2nd century Roman senator, legate and consul

Suffect consul of the Roman Empire
- In office 114 Serving with Gaius Clodius Nummus
- Monarch: Domitian

Personal details
- Roman tribe: Stellatina
- Military career
- Branch: Imperial Roman army
- Rank: Military tribune and legatus legionis
- Commands: Legio XIII Gemina
- Awards: dona militaria

Lucius Caesennius Sospes was a Roman senator of the 1st and 2nd centuries AD. Through his mother, Flavia Sabina, a cousin of the Roman emperors Titus and Domitian, his connections enabled him to hold a series of civil and military imperial appointments. He was suffect consul in the nundinium of May to August 114 as the colleague of Gaius Clodius Nummus. Sopses is known primarily from an inscription found in Pisidian Antioch.

== Life ==
According to Ronald Syme, he acquired his unusual cognomen Sospes ("safe and sound") most probably from an event during his childhood. His father Lucius Caesennius Paetus, consul in 61, had been surprised by the Parthian advance in the Roman–Parthian War. While retreating before the enemy, Paetus had sent his wife and Lucius Caesennius (Syme estimates he was four years of age at the time) to safety in the fortress of Arsamosata; for a while the Parthians besieged the fortress. "An event in the life of a man or a family may be visibly commemorated by the choice of a cognomen," Syme observes.

Sospes was the son of Paetus and Flavia, and the brother of Lucius Junius Caesennius Paetus, consul in 79. His senatorial career likely began in his teens as one of the tresviri aere argento auro flando feriundo, the most prestigious of the four boards comprising the vigintivirate. Membership in this board was usually allocated to patricians or young men with powerful patrons; as nephew of the late Vespasian, he likely fell into the latter category.

This was followed by Sospes serving as military tribune of the Legio XXII Primigenia which was stationed in Pannonia at the time; while serving as a junior officer in the legion, Sospes "received the decorations appropriate to a legate of praetorian rank, expedit(ione) Suebic(a) et Sarm(atica)." Syme explains he earned these dona militaria from actions in Domitian's campaigns in Pannonia around 92, in response to the Sarmatians and Suebi having invaded that province and destroying Legio XXI Rapax.

This period of military service was followed by his election as the quaestor assigned to the province of Creta et Cyrenaica. Upon completion of this traditional Republican magistracy Sospes would be enrolled in the Senate. He returned to Rome, where he held two more of the traditional Republican magistracies: curule aedile, and praetor.

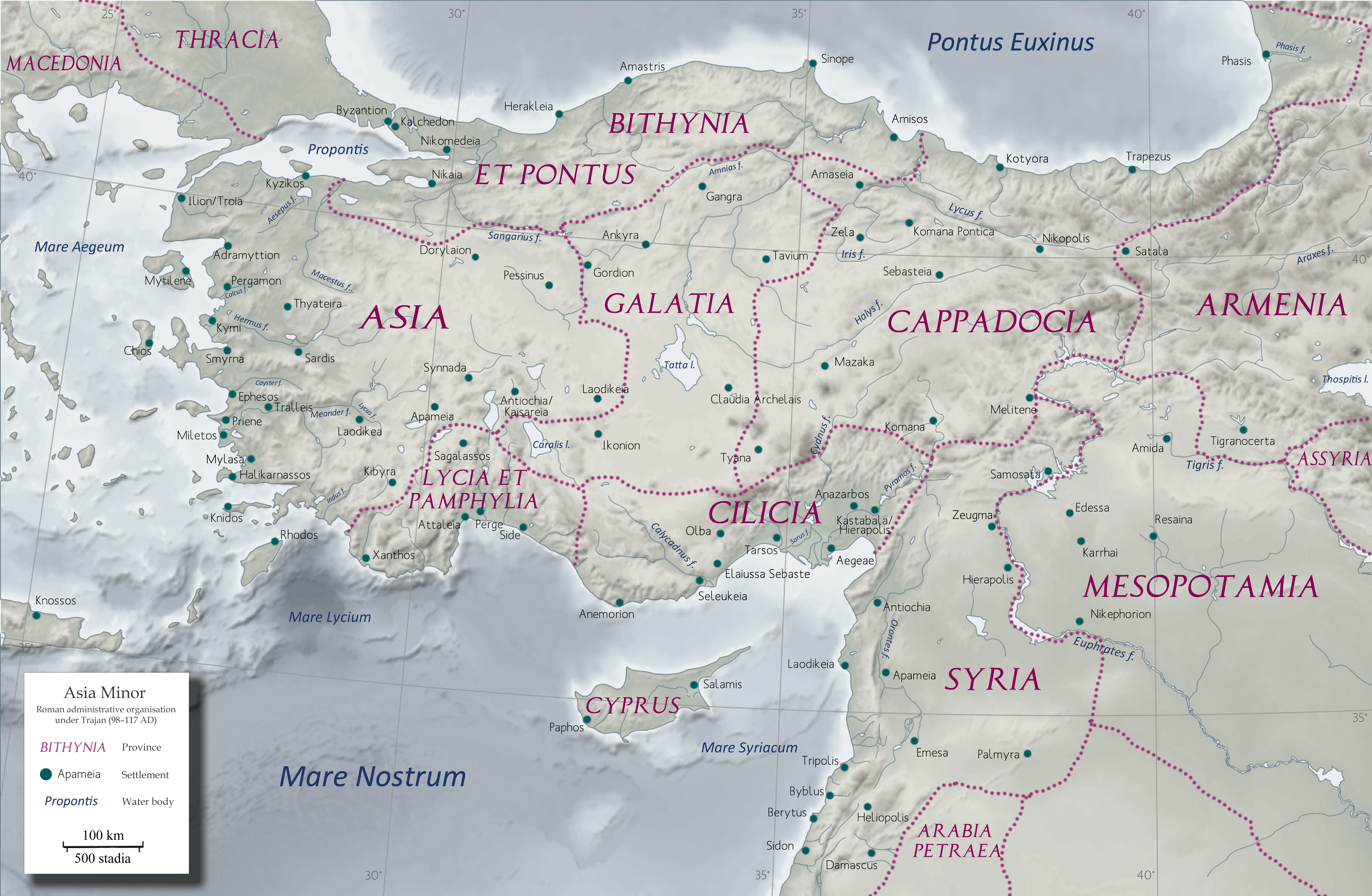
Roman provinces of Asia Minor, around AD 100

After completing his year as praetor, Sospes was then appointed to two civilian offices: praefectus frumenti dandi, the officer in charge of the Roman alimentum; and curator coloniarum et municipiorum, the equivalent of the governor of Roman Italy. Syme notes these last two offices are "something of a surprise": the first was not normally held by "men who achieve eminence in war or peace", while the second is otherwise not attested before the reign of Trajan. Then a further surprise: the inscription from Pisidian Antioch records he was made legatus Augusti pro praetore (or governor) of a series of districts – Galatia, Pisidia, Phrygia, Lycaonia, Isauria, Paphlagonia, and other districts. Syme provides a possible solution to this puzzle: he notes that the governor of Cappadocia, Lucius Antistius Rusticus, died in office in AD 94; he proposes that on the death of Rusticus that the province was temporarily divided between the two legionary legates, with Sospes, legatus legionis or commander of Legio XIII Gemina, assuming control of Galatia and the neighboring districts, while the other assumed responsibility for the parts of Cappadocia bordering Armenia and Parthia. When Rome was able to send a consular replacement – Titus Pomponius Bassus, who arrived the next year – the two legionary legates returned to their regular responsibilities.

"After military laurels in Pannonia and the governorship of Galatia, Sospes could look forward with rational confidence to a consulship in 97 or 98," Syme observes. "Fortune turned against, with Domitian assassinated in September of 96 and Trajan adopted by Nerva eleven months later." As a relative of a hated ruler, Sospes lost his privileged position. It was not until 114 that Sospes was awarded the consulship by the emperor Trajan. Syme speculates that this achievement was "not unalloyed bliss": Lucius Caesennius Sospes held the fasces the same year that Trajan marched into Armenia, and the first place he occupied was Arsamosata, where his father had surrendered to the Parthians in AD 62.

== Family ==
It is not known whether Sospes was married, or who his spouse may have been. A Lucius Caesennius Antoninus was suffect consul in 128; it is not known if he was Sospes' son or the grandson of his brother.

== See also ==
- List of Roman consuls

Political offices
Preceded by Quintus Ninnius Hasta, and Publius Manilius Vopiscus Vicinillianus as Ordinary consuls	Suffect consul of the Roman Empire; 114 with Gaius Clodius Nummus	Succeeded by Lucius Hedius Rufus Lollianus Avitus, and Marcus Messius Rusticus as Suffect consuls
