= Gaius Clodius Nummus =

Former Roman politician

Gaius Clodius Nummus was a Roman senator, who was active during the reign of Trajan. He was consul for the year 114 with Lucius Caesennius Sospes as his colleague. He is known almost exclusively from inscriptions.

Experts have suggested identification of Nummus with two other men, and it is possible all three may be the same person. The first is known from inscriptions from Ephesus and Neapolis, Lucius Stertinius C.f. Maec. Quintilianus Acilius Strabo Gaius Curiatius Maternus Clodius Nummus. The inscription at Ephesus was set up by Lucius Stertinius Quitillianus etc. to his father Gaius Clodius C.f. Maec. Nummus, who died as quaestor in the province of Asia. From this, Olli Salomies, in his monograph on polyonymous names in the first centuries of the Roman Empire, surmises that after his father's death the younger Nummus was named at birth Gaius Clodius Nummus and adopted by a Lucius Stertinius Quintilianus Acilius Strabo Gaius Curiatius Maternus; this would have been a testamentary adoption, since the filiation of the younger Nummus is C.f. (referencing a Gaius), not L.f. (referencing his adoptive father).

The second person Nummus the suffect consul could be identified with is a Lucius Acilius Strabo Clodius Nummus, who is attested as a legatus legionis or commander of Legio III Augusta, stationed in Numidia, in 116, as well as a consul. Discussing the possibilities, Ronald Syme opines that if Lucius Nummus the consul in 114 is not identical to Lucius Nummus the legatus, then the latter man held the consular fasces in the year 117, where there are a number of vacancies in the record. In his own discussion of the evidence, Salomies identifies the consul of 114 with Lucius Stertinius Quitillianus etc., while arguing that Nummus the legatus was a separate person, possibly related to Lucius Acilius Strabo, consul in 80. Until further evidence is recovered, the question as to whether the consul of 114 is one, both, or neither of these men must remain unresolved.

== See also ==
- Lucius Acilius Strabo

Political offices
Preceded by Quintus Ninnius Hasta, and Publius Manilius Vopiscus Vicinillianus as Ordinary consuls	Consul of the Roman Empire; 114 with Lucius Caesennius Sospes	Succeeded by Lucius Hedius Rufus Lollianus Avitus, and Marcus Messius Rusticus as Suffect consuls
