= Valentia gens =

Ancient Roman family

The gens Valentia was an obscure plebeian family at ancient Rome. Few members of this gens appear in history, but others are known from inscriptions. The most famous of the Valentii was Aulus Valentius, one of the servants of Verres during his maladministration of Sicily. According to one inscription, the emperor Hostilian was a Valentius, but this may be a mistake, and he was probably a member of the Messia gens.

== Origin ==
The nomen Valentius is derived from valens, the participle of valeo, "to be strong". It thus belongs to an abundant class of gentilicia formed from either the character or the condition of an individual.

== Praenomina ==
The main praenomina of the Valentii were Lucius and Titus. A few members of this family bore other names, including Aulus, Publius, and Gaius. All of these were among the most common names throughout all periods of Roman history.

== Members ==
This list includes abbreviated praenomina. For an explanation of this practice, see filiation.

- Aulus Valentius, a Greek interpreter, became one of Verres' agents during his plundering of Sicily. Cicero records an instance in which he extracted thirty-thousand sestertii from the inhabitants of Lipara, in addition to the amount that was owed, less than a third the value of his "bonus".
- Valentia Repentina Verecunda, a freedwoman buried in a late first-century sepulchre at Savaria in Pannonia Superior, built from the proceeds of the will of Sextus Uttiedius Celer, a veteran of the Legio XV Apollinaris, for himself, Valentia, the freedwoman Uttiedia, and others.
- Valentia P. l. Echinia, a freedwoman who, along with Tertia Herennia, received a donation from the aediles, according to a late first- or early second-century inscription from Novaria in Cisalpine Gaul.
- Valentia, the widow of Lucius Valerius, was buried at Novaria in a family sepulchre dating from the first half of the second century, built by her son, Lucius Valerius Primus, one of the seviri Augustales, for his mother and brother, Lucius Valerius Optatus.
- Lucius Valentius, buried in a second-century tomb at Rome, built by his brother, Gaius Valentius Niger.
- Lucius Valentius Cere[...], named on a second-century lead pipe from Forum Novum in Sabinum.
- Titus Valentius T. f., the son of Titus Valentius Haruspex and Cominia Pusilla, buried in a second-century family sepulchre at the present site of Cavaglio d'Agogna, formerly part of Cisalpine Gaul, built by his sister, Valentia, out of the proceeds of her father's will.
- Valentius Demetrius, dedicated a second-century tomb at Apulum in Dacia for Gaius Atrius Crescens, a native of Carsulae in Umbria and a soldier in the Legio XIII Gemina, aged thirty-five.
- Lucius Valentius Eutychus, built a second-century tomb at Verona for himself and his patron, Lucius Valentius Senecio.
- Titus Valentius Haruspex, buried in a second-century family sepulchre at the present site of Cavaglio d'Agogna, built by his daughter, Valentia, out of the proceeds of her father's will, for Valentius, his wife, Cominia Pusilla, and their children, Valentius Secundus, Titus Valentius, and Titulla.
- Gaius Valentius Niger, dedicated a second-century tomb at Rome for himself and his brother, Lucius Valentius.
- (Titus) Valentius T. f. Secundus, the son of Titus Valentius Haruspex and Cominia Pusilla, buried in a second-century family sepulchre at the present site of Cavaglio d'Agogna, built by his sister, Valentia, out of the proceeds of her father's will.
- Lucius Valentius Senecio, buried in a second-century tomb at Verona in Venetia and Histria, built by his client, Lucius Valentius Eutychus.
- Valentia T. f. Titulla, the daughter of Titus Valentius Haruspex and Cominia Pusilla, buried in a second-century family sepulchre at the present site of Cavaglio d'Agogna, built by her sister, Valentia, out of the proceeds of her father's will.
- Valentius Domitianus, a soldier in the Legio III Italica, buried in a family sepulchre at Castra Regina in Raetia between the late second century and the end of the third.
- Valentius Paulus, made an offering to Jupiter Optimus Maximus at the site of modern Ribeira de Pena, formerly part of Hispania Citerior, according to an inscription from the second or third century.
- Valentia Flora, the wife of Artorius Primitivus, with whom she built a third-century tomb at Rome for their son, whose name is not preserved, aged twenty-two years, two months, and nineteen days.
- Gaius Valentius Hostilianus Messius Quintus, the emperor Hostilian, according to an inscription from Gamart in Africa Proconsularis; inscriptions on his coinage give Valens rather than Valentius. From his father's nomenclature, he probably belonged to the Messia gens rather than the Valentii.
- Valentius, buried in a fourth-century tomb at Rome, aged eighteen, on the sixth day before the Kalends of December. (Note: November 26.)
- Valentius, buried in a fourth-century tomb at Thugga in Africa Proconsularis, aged eighty.
- Valentius, named on a bronze label found at the present site of Montilla, formerly part of Hispania Baetica, dating from the fourth or fifth century.
- Valentius Baebianus, donated a bath at Asola in Venetia and Histria in AD 336.
- Valentius, a little boy buried in a fifth-century tomb at Augusta Treverorum in Gallia Belgica, aged about four.

=== Undated Valentii ===
- Valentius, named in an inscription from Turgalium in Lusitania.
- Valentia Januaria, buried at Regiae in Mauretania Caesariensis, aged about forty, in a tomb built by her husband, Appertius Sorcius, for Januaria and their daughter, Apertia Valentina, aged five.

== See also ==
- List of Roman gentes

== Bibliography ==
- Marcus Tullius Cicero, In Verrem.
- Dictionary of Greek and Roman Biography and Mythology, William Smith, ed., Little, Brown and Company, Boston (1849).
- Theodor Mommsen et alii, Corpus Inscriptionum Latinarum (The Body of Latin Inscriptions, abbreviated CIL), Berlin-Brandenburgische Akademie der Wissenschaften (1853–present).
- Bulletin Archéologique du Comité des Travaux Historiques et Scientifiques (Archaeological Bulletin of the Committee on Historic and Scientific Works, abbreviated BCTH), Imprimerie Nationale, Paris (1885–1973).
- René Cagnat et alii, L'Année épigraphique (The Year in Epigraphy, abbreviated AE), Presses Universitaires de France (1888–present).
- Hermann Dessau, Inscriptiones Latinae Selectae (Select Latin Inscriptions, abbreviated ILS), Berlin (1892–1916).
- Inscriptiones Christianae Urbis Romae (Christian Inscriptions from the City of Rome, abbreviated ICUR), New Series, Rome (1922–present).
- Friedrich Wagner, "Neue Inschriften aus Raetien", in Berichte der Römisch-Germanischen Kommission, vol. 37/38, pp. 215–264 (1956–1957).
- D.P. Simpson, Cassell's Latin and English Dictionary, Macmillan Publishing Company, New York (1963).
- Recueil des Inscriptions Chrétiennes de la Gaule, Paris (1975–present).
- Hispania Epigraphica (Epigraphy of Spain), Madrid (1989–present).
