= Statius (praenomen) =

Italic praenomen (first name)

Statius is a Italic praenomen, or personal name, which was used during the period of the Roman Republic, and into imperial times. It was not widely used at Rome, but gave rise to the patronymic gentes Statia and Statilia. The feminine form is Statia. As it was not widespread in Latin. Statius was not regularly abbreviated, but is sometimes found with the abbreviations St. and Sta.

== Origin and meaning ==
Although it was occasionally used by families of Latin origin, the praenomen Statius occurs much more frequently in Oscan gentes, and particularly amongst the Samnites. Chase concludes that the name is clearly of Oscan origin, although it may be that it belongs to that class of names which was common to both Oscan and Latin.

Aulus Gellius recorded the tradition that Statius was a name originally given to persons of servile origin. This belief probably arose because many of the people who bore this name at Rome arrived as captives taken during wars between Rome and various Oscan peoples. Gellius' own name indicates that his family was of Oscan origin.
