= Livre des merveilles du monde =

Livre des merveilles du monde may refer to:

- Livre des Merveilles du Monde, a book by John Mandeville
- The Travels of Marco Polo, a 13th-century travelogue
- Livre des merveilles (BNF Fr2810), a 15th-century French illuminated manuscript
- Des merveilles du monde et principalemẽt des admirables choses des Indes & du nouveau monde, a 1553 work by Guillaume Postel
