= Lucius Vipstanus Messalla =

Lucius Vipstanus Messalla may refer to:

- Lucius Vipstanus Messalla (orator) (45–80 AD), Roman military officer, senator and orator
- Lucius Vipstanus Messalla (consul), Roman senator who was consul ordinarius in AD 115
