= Lucius Hedius Rufus Lollianus Avitus (consul 144) =

Roman senator and military officer

Lucius Hedius Rufus Lollianus Avitus (fl. 2nd century) was a Roman senator and military officer. He was consul in the year 144 as the colleague of Titus Statilius Maximus.

== Biography ==
Rufus Lollianus was a member of the gens Hedia Lolliana, which probably originated from the region of Liguria. He was the son of Lucius (Hedius Rufus) Lollianus Avitus, who was appointed suffect consul in AD 114. A noted orator, he was elected to the office of consul in AD 144 alongside Titus Statilius Maximus. This was followed by his appointment as curator operum publicorum (or curator of public works) in 146.

Probably around AD 157/8 Rufus Lollianus was appointed the Proconsular governor of Africa; his legatus proconsularis was Gaius Vibius Gallio Claudius Severus. During his next appointment as Legatus Augusti pro praetore (or imperial governor) of Bithynia et Pontus in 159, he was confronted by Lucian about prosecuting Alexander of Abonoteichus; Rufus Lollianus demurred, claiming not only was Lucian's case weak, but that Alexander's patron, Publius Mummius Sisenna Rutilianus, was too influential to overcome. Around AD 162, he was assigned a special task when the emperor Lucius Aurelius Verus left for the Parthian campaign.

Rufus Lollianus was a patronus of Helvius Successus, the father of the future emperor Pertinax. He was also an amicus of Marcus Cornelius Fronto. Rufus Lollianus married a daughter of Decimus Terentius Gentianus, suffect consul of AD 116, and they had at least two children: Quintus Hedius Rufus Lollianus Gentianus, suffect consul around AD 186–188; and Lucius Hedius Rufus Lollianus, suffect consul before AD 193.

== Sources ==
- Mennen, Inge, Power and Status in the Roman Empire, AD 193-284 (2011)

Political offices
Preceded by Quintus Junius Calamus; Marcus Valerius Junianus as suffect consuls	Consul of the Roman Empire; January–February 144 with Titus Statilius Maximus	Succeeded by Lucius Aemilius Carus; Quintus Egrilius Plarianus as suffect consuls
