= Lucius Acilius Strabo =

Roman senator

Lucius Acilius Strabo was a Roman senator active during the first century AD. He was suffect consul for the nundinium September-October 80 as the colleague of Sextus Neranius Capito. He is known entirely from inscriptions.

Acilius Strabo belongs to one of the major branches of the gens Acilia, but one which is not as familiar as the Acilii Glabriones and the Acilii Aviones. Further details about the Acili Strabones are uncertain.

== Assignment to Cyrenaica ==
Acilius Strabo's first appearance in history is in Tacitus, as praetor. He had been sent by the emperor Claudius to Cyrenaica to resolve property disputes over personal estates that king Ptolemy Apion had bequeathed to the Roman people along with his kingdom. Consequently, some of the landowners objected to his judgments, and in the reign of Nero they petitioned the Roman senate for redress. The Senate responded that they had no knowledge of the instructions Claudius had given Strabo, and passed the petition to the emperor, who resolved the matter.

A number of inscriptions bearing Strabo's name and dated to the reign of Claudius have been found in North Africa. Some bear dates ranging from AD 53 to 56; if Strabo was praetor in the year 53, then it took him 27 years to reach the office of consul, whereas the Lex Villia Annalis specifies a period of ten years between the office of praetor and consul for senators who were not in the patrician class. While lengthy periods between the two offices are documented for other senators, it is unusual.

== Date of his consulate ==
Until the recovery of the Fasti Septempeda, the date of Acilius Strabo's consulate has been based on an inscription found in Naples, which is dated both by both suffect consuls and a local official to AD 71. However, with the discovery of the Fasti Septempeda a number of authorities have endorsed a date in the year 80, while some, such as Werner Eck, have proposed there were two men with the same name: one consul in 71, who handled the property disputes of Cyrenaica; the other, his son, was the consul of 80. Eck's suggestion would explain the lengthy period between the praetorship and consulship; it arises from confusion of two homonymous senators.

== Governor of Germania Superior ==
Another inscription, found in the ancient quarries of the Brohlbach, has led to another instance of disputed identity. This is on a stone altar, which is dated to the period when "L. Acilius Strabo" was "legati Augusti". It is unclear whether by legatus this Acilius Strabo was governor of Germania Superior, or possibly the commander of a legion stationed in the province; the word is commonly used to indicate both. The date of his activity in Germania Superior depends on the interpretation of this inscription. If Acilius Strabo was a legionary commander, then the altar dates to the time before his consulate, likely the late 70s. If he was governor, it would date to the time after; in the latest compilation of governors of this province, there is a gap between the years 83 and 87, and Strabo's term of office could have fallen then.

There is also the possibility that this Acilius Strabo may not be the suffect consul discussed above, but a polyonymous senator, Lucius Stertinus Quintillianus Acilius Strabo Gaius Curiatius Maternus Clodius Nummus, consul in 114. The name of this later Acilius Strabo points to a testamentary adoption by a Lucius Acilius Strabo, who may be identical to the consul of 80. This is the case when a man dies without heirs, and wishes to preserve his lineage; and if it is what happened, the consul of 80 was the last of his line.

Political offices
Preceded by Marcus Atilius Postumus Bradua; Quintus Pompeius Trio as suffecti	Roman consul 80 (suffect) with Sextus Neranius Capito	Succeeded by Marcus Tittius Frugi; Titus Vinicius Julianus as suffecti
