= Titus Statilius Maximus Severus Hadrianus =

Roman suffect consul in 115 AD

Titus Statilius Maximus Severus Hadrianus was a Roman senator, who was active during the reign of Trajan. He was suffect consul in the year 115, replacing the consul Marcus Pedo Vergilianus killed by an earthquake in Antioch.

Hadrianus was descended from a wealthy Syrian family; Géza Alföldy has identified two of his relatives active in that province, one the patron of Heliopolis (modern Baalbek), the other a prominent citizen of Beirut. He is known to have had at least one son, Titus Statilius Maximus, consul in 144.

Only a few steps in his cursus honorum are known. Ronald Syme states that he is "probably" the Statilius Severus, a military tribune assigned to an unknown legion, to whom Trajan addressed a rescript concerning a soldier's testament.

The other appointment Hadrianus is known to have received was governor of Thracia; he is mentioned as the governor succeeding Publius Juventius Celsus on a military diploma dated 19 July 114. Werner Eck dates the tenure of Hadrianus in Thracia from the years 112 to 115, admitting to the possibility that Hadrianus may have been consul in absentia.

His life after his suffect consulate is a blank.

Political offices
Preceded by Marcus Pedo Vergilianus, and Lucius Vipstanus Messalla as ordinary consuls	Suffect consul of the Roman Empire; 115 with Lucius Vipstanus Messalla	Succeeded by Lucius Julius Frugi, and Publius Juventius Celsus Titus Aufidius Hoenius Severianus as suffect consuls
