= Marcus Pedo Vergilianus =

Early 2nd century Roman senator and consul

Marcus Pedo Vergilianus was consul at the beginning of AD 115, during the reign of Trajan. He died in an earthquake toward the end of that year. His true family name is uncertain, his gens being omitted from surviving versions of his name.

== Career ==
Vergilianus was a Roman senator early in the second century. In the year 115, he was consul ordinarius, serving for the month of January, with Lucius Vipstanus Messalla as his colleague. Vergilianus resigned at the end of the month, and was succeeded by Titus Statilius Maximus Severus Hadrianus, who served alongside Messalla through the end of April.

Vergilianus is best known for having been killed in the earthquake that struck Antioch toward the end of the year. The city and the surrounding region suffered tremendous damage, and the emperor Trajan, who was at Antioch preparing for a campaign against the Parthians, barely escaped death by climbing out the window of the house where he was staying, sustaining only minor injuries. Although implied by Cassius Dio to have died during his term of office, Vergilianus must have resigned by the kalends of February, when his successor was inaugurated, while the earthquake occurred on December 13. Thus, while Vergilianus was of consular rank, he was not serving as consul at the time of his death, and was probably at Antioch as part of Trajan's retinue.

== Nomenclature ==
Although a relatively obscure figure in Roman history, Vergilianus has received additional scrutiny due to the uncertainty surrounding his proper name. In epigraphy, he is referred to variously as Marcus Pedo Vergilianus or Marcus Vergilianus Pedo; other inscriptions refer to him simply as Pedo, or as Vergilianus. However, it is almost certain that these names do not comprise his complete nomenclature. Pedo is a Roman surname, or cognomen, not a nomen gentilicium, and while some gentilicia share the morphology of Vergilianus, this is probably an agnomen, a type of surname indicating the consul's descent from the Vergilia gens. In imperial times, it was not uncommon for members of the Roman aristocracy to possess extended and occasionally cumbersome nomenclature, indicating their descent from different illustrious families. These names could be rearranged by the bearer at will, and nomenclature was frequently abbreviated for convenience. Even under the Roman Republic, nomina were occasionally omitted for persons whose gentes could be inferred from familiar surnames.

Werner Eck concludes that Vergilianus was probably a member of the Popilia gens, based on the similarity of his name with several members of that family who achieved prominence during the second century, including Gaius Popilius Carus Pedo, consul at the end of 147, Popilius Pedo Apronianus, consul in 191, and Marcus Popilius Pedo, one of the Salii Palatini. His name would thus have been Marcus Popillius Pedo Vergilianus. This reasoning is followed by Prosopographia Imperii Romani, and noted by both Olli Salomies and Ronald Syme, although elsewhere Syme mentions that Pompeius is also a possibility, since a consular by the name of Pompeius Pedo had been executed by Claudius.

Political offices
Preceded by L. Hedius Rufus Lollianus Avitus; Marcus Messius Rusticus as suffecti	Roman consul AD 115 with Lucius Vipstanus Messalla	Succeeded by T. Statilius Maximus Severus Hadrianus as suffect
