= Lucius Vipstanus Messalla (consul 115) =

2nd century Roman senator and consul

Lucius Vipstanus Messalla was a Roman Senator.

== Life ==
He was consul ordinarius in 115 with Marcus Pedo Vergilianus as his colleague. Vergilianus was killed in an earthquake at the end of January and was replaced by Titus Statilius Maximus Severus Hadrianus, who completed the nundinium with Messalla as consul suffectus.

Ronald Syme states that Vipstanus Messalla was the son of Lucius Vipstanus Messalla. The younger Messalla had a son named Lucius Vipstanus Poplicola Messalla.

Political offices
| Preceded by L. Hedius Rufus Lollianus Avitus; Marcus Messius Rusticus as suffecti | Roman consul AD 115 with Marcus Pedo Vergilianus, followed by Titus Statilius Maximus Severus Hadrianus | Succeeded by Lucius Julius Frugi; P. Juventius Celsus as suffecti |
