= Quintus Egrilius Plarianus =

2nd century Roman senator, governor and consul

Quintus Egrilius Plarianus was a Roman senator, who was active during the reigns of Antoninus Pius and Marcus Aurelius. He was suffect consul for one of the nundinia in the first half of AD 144, as the colleague of Lucius Aemilius Carus. Plarianus was the son of Marcus Acilius Priscus Egrilius Plarianus; he also is known to have had a sister, Egrilia M.f. Plaria. Although his family had its origins in Ostia, it is likely he spent most of his life in Rome.

Plarianus is known to have been governor of Moesia superior from c.152 to c.155 and proconsular governor of Africa. An inscription from Avitta Bibba (now in Tunisia) attests he was governor of that province in the year 159, with his son Quintus Egrilius Plarianus as his legate or assistant. While governing in Africa, Plarianus received a letter from the literary figure Fronto, recommending one Julius Aquilinus for a job in his administration and praising the young man for his learning and eloquence.

Political offices
Preceded by Lucius Hedius Rufus Lollianus Avitus, and Titus Statilius Maximus as ordinary consuls	Suffect consul of the Roman Empire; 144 with Lucius Aemilius Carus	Succeeded by ignotus, and Quintus Laberius Licinianus as suffect consuls
