= Lucius Aemilius Carus =

Lucius Aemilius Carus (fl. 2nd century AD) was a Roman military officer and senator who served as consul suffectus for one of the nundinia in the first half of AD 144, with Quintus Egrilius Plarianus as his colleague. His life is known primarily through inscriptions.

== Biography ==
The son of Lucius and a member of the Roman tribe Camilia, Carus' career began with his appointment to the decemviri stlitibus judicandis, one of the four boards of the vigintiviri; membership in one of these four boards was a preliminary and required first step toward gaining entry into the Roman Senate. This was followed by serving as a military tribune, firstly of the Legio VIII Augusta, at the time stationed at Argentoratum (Strasbourg), then of the Legio IX Hispana, sometime after AD 122. Returning to Rome, Carus began his climb up the series of Republican magistracies: he was first appointed quaestor to the Emperor, then Plebeian Tribune before achieving the Praetorship.

Returning to the military sphere, Carus was granted the rank of Legatus legionis, commanding the Legio XXX Ulpia Victrix. Anthony Birley notes that this was an unusual assignment, for Legio XXX and Legio IX were both stationed in the same province, Germania Inferior, and men were rarely assigned command of a legion in the same army as they had held a tribunate; Birley could only list 14 men with that distinction. He returned to civilian life, serving as curator of the Via Flaminia. His next assignment was as Legatus Augusti pro praetore (or governor) of the Roman province of Arabia Petraea from AD 142 to 143. In 144, he was appointed suffect consul, and this was followed up with an appointment as imperial censitor of Gallia Lugdunensis. Finally, Carus was made Legatus Augusti pro praetore, or governor, of Cappadocia.

Carus was a member of the Quindecimviri sacris faciundis, the collegium of Roman priests entrusted with the care of the Sibylline oracles, and the sodales Flaviales, a less prominent collegium.

== Family ==
Carus' son, also named Lucius Aemilius Carus, was Legatus Augusti pro praetore of the province of Tres Daciae in AD 174/175, and suffect consul at some point between 170 and 175.

== Sources ==
- Campbell, Brian (2006), The Roman Army, 31 BC - AD 337: A Sourcebook, Routledge
- Klebs, Elimarus (1897), Prosopographia Imperii Romani, Saec. I, II, III, Pars I

Political offices
Preceded by Lucius Hedius Rufus Lollianus Avitus, and Titus Statilius Maximus as ordinary consuls	Suffect consul of the Roman Empire; 144 with Quintus Egrilius Plarianus	Succeeded by ignotus, and Quintus Laberius Licinianus as suffect consuls
