= Publius Manilius Vopiscus Vicinillianus =

Roman senator

Publius Manilius Vopiscus Vicinillianus was a Roman senator of the 2nd century AD, who was ordinary consul for the year 114 as the colleague of Quintus Ninnius Hasta.

== Family ==
His complete name, Publius Manilius Vopiscus Vicinillianus Lucius Elufrius Julius Quadratus Bassus, is polyonymous; the shorter version of his name that appears in consular dates is Publius Manilius Vopiscus. An inscription recovered from Tibur shows that his father's praenomen was Publius. The dedicators of this inscription, N. Prosius Platanus and his wife Minilia Eutychia (probably a freedwoman of Vopiscus) named their children Vicinilla, Vopiscianus and Atticus, and notes "obviously the parents had the consul in mind when naming two of their children."

The poet Statius in his Silvae provides a lengthy description of a villa owned by one Manilius Vospiscus, aside the Anio River and sheltered by two rocky outcrops. It is uncertain if the villa owner is the same person as the consul of 114: Ronald Syme notes there was a suffect consul in the year 60 named Marcus Manilius Vospiscus, and because Statius' wish for a long life might not fit a man already elderly at the time Statius wrote his poem, Syme then suggests the consul's father Publius.

Some scholars have suggested that Vopiscus had been adopted by Gaius Julius Quadratus Bassus, consul of 105, but in his monograph on naming practices in the Early Roman Empire, Olli Salomies points out "the order of the names rules this out". He is equally doubtful about the connection with Lucius Elufrius Severus, proconsul of Crete and Cyrenaica in 100. However, Ronald Syme notes "Elufrius" is a very rare family name: "No specimens from any province, and in Italy confined to a narrow region of Umbria." "Multiple names are not always the product of ancestry or adoption", Syme asserts. "Advertising social success or aspirations, they may commemorate amity or a benefactor without any close tie of propinquity." He points out that Vopiscus, as explained below, was military tribune in Syria at the same time Quadratus Bassus was governor, which strengthens the possibility of some kind of connection.

== Career ==
The inscription from Tibur provides the details of a likely patrician career, although some offices are presented out of order. Vopiscus began his career in his teenage years as one of the tresviri monetalis, which was the most prestigious of the four boards comprising the vigintiviri — it was usually held either by patricians or favored plebeians — about the same time he was admitted into the Salii Collinus. According to the order of the inscription, Vopiscus was a military tribune in Legio IV Scythica before he was a quaestor in attendance to the emperor Trajan; this order is unusual, for, by this point in history, serving as a military tribune almost always came after the office of quaestor. After his term as praetor, Vopiscus was admitted as flamen, then was co-opted into the College of Pontiffs. He served as a curator fani Herculis Victoris fuit Tibure before acceding to the consulship.

Vopiscus' career after the consulate and the date of his death are unknown.

Political offices
| Preceded by Gnaeus Cornelius Urbicus, and Titus Sempronius Rufus as Suffect consuls | Consul of the Roman Empire; 114 with Quintus Ninnius Hasta | Succeeded by Gaius Clodius Nummus, and Lucius Caesennius Sospes as Suffect consuls |
