= Marcus Atilius Postumus Bradua =

1st century Roman senator, consul and governor

Marcus Atilius Postumus Bradua was a Roman senator during the later part of the first century. He was suffect consul for the nundinium July-August 80 with Quintus Pompeius Trio as his colleague. He was also governor of Asia in 94/95.

Bradua is commonly believed to be the father of Marcus Atilius Metilius Bradua, suffect consul in 108; if so, his son's name indicates that Bradua married a Metilia.

Political offices
Preceded by Gaius Marius Marcellus Octavius Publius Cluvius Rufus, and Lucius Aelius Lamia Plautius Aelianus as suffect consuls	Suffect consul of the Roman Empire; 80 with Quintus Pompeius Trio	Succeeded by Sextus Neranius Capito, and Lucius Acilius Strabo as suffect consuls
