= Lucius Statius Quadratus =

2nd century Roman senator, consul and governor

Lucius Statius Quadratus was a Senator of the Roman Empire. Besides being consul ordinarius with Lucius Cuspius Pactumeius Rufinus in AD 142, he was proconsul of Asia during the reign of the emperor Antoninus Pius. Statius Quadratus is best known for presiding over the trial and execution of Polycarp, bishop of Smyrna.

== Life ==
Statius Quadratus was a native of Athens, and is considered the son of Lucius Statius Aquila, suffect consul in 116. His existence is attested by an inscription recovered from Magnesia ad Sipylum (IGR 3,175).

== Date of the trial of Polycarp ==
Statius Quadratus' role in the trial of Polycarp provides an important clue to the date of the bishop's martyrdom. Eusebius, in his Chronicle, dates his martyrdom to 166–7; yet a letter from the Christians in Smyrna to those in Philomelium describing his arrest and execution states he was executed on Saturday, Xanthicus 2, i.e. 23 February, in the proconsulship of Statius Quadratus, although two experts have argued independently that Xanthicus 2 should actually be equated to 22 February. Further, a reference in Aelius Aristides has been used to date Quadratus' tenure to 153/154. Of these, that 23 February fell on a Saturday in 155, and 22 February on a Saturday in 156, has convinced most experts to place Polycarp's death in one of those two years. Géza Alföldy dated Statius Quadratus' tenure to 156/157. However, a new inscription shows Gaius Bellicius Flaccus Torquatus as proconsul of Asia in 156/157, pushing Quadratus' proconsulate back to 155/156 or even earlier.

Political offices
| Preceded by Lucius Annius Fabianus, and ignotus as suffect consuls | Consul of the Roman Empire; 142 with Lucius Cuspius Pactumeius Rufinus | Succeeded by Lucius Granius Castus, and Tiberius Junius Julianus as suffect consuls |
