= Quintus Ninnius Hasta =

Roman senator

Quintus Ninnius Hasta was a Roman senator, who was active during the reign of Trajan. He was consul in 114 with Publius Manilius Vopiscus Vicinillianus as his colleague. He is known entirely from inscriptions.

The Ninnii appear to be a family with their origins in Italy; Ronald Syme is certain this family arose in Campania. Hasta has been identified as the son of the homonymous consul of 88, and possibly the father of Quintus Ninnius Hastianus, consul in 160. He is mentioned in Justinian's Digest as a proconsular governor, but it is unclear whether the province was Asia or Africa. Syme, noting there is only four gaps in the series of governors of Asia from the year 100 to 138, and provides names for all but the term 127/128, assigns Hasta the proconsulate of Africa for the otherwise vacant term 128/129.

Political offices
Preceded by Gnaeus Cornelius Urbicus; Titus Sempronius Rufus as suffect consuls	Roman consul 114 with Publius Manilius Vopiscus Vicinillianus	Succeeded by Gaius Clodius Nummus; Lucius Caesennius Sospes as suffect consuls
