= Titus Statilius Maximus =

Roman senator, consul in 144 AD

Titus Statilius Maximus was a Roman senator of the 2nd century AD. He was consul in the year 144 as the colleague of Lucius Hedius Rufus Lollianus Avitus. He is known entirely from inscriptions.

Maximus was descended from a wealthy Syrian family; Géza Alföldy has identified two of his relatives active in that province, one the patron of Heliopolis (modern Baalbek), the other a prominent citizen of Beirut. He was the son of Titus Statilius Maximus Severus Hadrianus, consul in 115. It is possible Maximus was the father of Titus Statilius Severus, consul in 171.

After his time as a consul, he is attested as the curator aedium sacrarum in the year 146. For the period 157/158, he was proconsular governor of Asia.

Political offices
| Preceded by Quintus Junius Calamus, and Marcus Valerius Junianus as suffect consuls | Consul of the Roman Empire; 144 with Lucius Hedius Rufus Lollianus Avitus | Succeeded by Lucius Aemilius Carus, and Quintus Egrilius Plarianus as suffect consuls |
