= Titus Statilius Severus =

Consul of Imperial Rome

Titus Statilius Severus was a Roman senator of the 2nd century AD. He was ordinary consul in 171 with Lucius Alfidius Herennianus as his colleague. Fragments of an incomplete inscription found in Cales and dated to 172–180 provide details about his career.

An investigation of his life by Giuseppe Camodeca established a timeline of his career. Born circa 132–134, Severus most likely was the son of Titus Statilius Maximus, consul ordinarius in 144. Severus started his cursus honorum when he was commissioned a tribunus laticlavius in Legio X Fretensis, garrisoned in Aelia Capitolina (c. 150–153). Returning to Rome, Severus became one of the tresviri monetales, the most prestigious of the four boards that comprised the vigintiviri (c. 154–155). Then he was sevir equitum Romanorum at the annual review of the equites at Rome.

Severus then advanced through the traditional Republican offices of quaestor (c. 157–159), tribune of the plebs (c. 159–161) and praetor (c. 162–164). Next he was prefect of the aerarium Saturni (state treasury). His triennial term of office is dated to 165–168.

The ordinary consulship followed in 171. Severus was then appointed praefectus alimentorum controlling the administration of alimenta in Italian towns.

Severus also served as IIIIvir quinquennalis, a municipal magistrate, at Cales, where his career inscription was found. He was a member of the priestly college of septemviri epulonum, responsible for arranging feasts and public banquets at festivals and games (ludi). He also joined the sodales Antoniniani Veriani, the priests in charge of the cult of Antoninus Pius and Lucius Verus.
