= Wilhelm von Boldensele =

14th century German friar, knight, pilgrim and writer

Wilhelm von Boldensele (c. 1285 – 1338/39), born Otto of Nygenhusen, was a German friar, knight and pilgrim from Saxony. He visited Egypt, the Sinai Peninsula and the Levant and wrote an account of his travels in Latin, Liber de quibusdam ultramarinis partibus et praecipue de Terra sancta.

A friar prior to his pilgrimage, Otto took the name William upon leaving the Dominican Order. He traveled to the eastern Mediterranean under Papal auspices between 1332 and 1336. He was probably on a reconnaissance mission for a future crusade as much as a religious pilgrimage. On his way east he stopped in Constantinople, Chios, Rhodes, Cyprus and possibly Athens. He met the Byzantine emperor Andronikos III, who entrusted to him a letter for the sultan of Egypt. In 1333 he records Jews regularly visiting graves in Jerusalem, and mentions the natural cave (Grotto of Gethsemane) in the Gethsemane where Jesus and his disciples retreated to pray after the Last Supper. In Jerusalem he was knighted into the Order of the Holy Sepulchre. He describes the Giza pyramids in 1335, recording the inscription left behind in memory of the 2nd century AD Roman senator Decimus Terentius Gentianus by his sister Terentia.

Ludolf von Sudheim, who traveled east in 1336–1341, made use of Wilhelm's account and later added to it.
