= Lucius Hedius Rufus Lollianus Avitus (consul 114) =

Suffect consul of the Roman Empire

Lucius Hedius Rufus Lollianus Avitus was a Roman senator active in the first quarter of the second century AD. He was suffect consul in the nundinium of September to December AD 114 with Marcus Messius Rusticus as his colleague. Many of the inscriptions referring to Avitus used the shorter form of his name, Lucius Lollianus Avitus. He is primarily known through inscriptions.

His family origins lie in Liguria. According to Anthony Birley he was married to Terentia, the daughter of Decimus Terentius Scaurianus, one of Emperor Trajan's generals. Avitus is also known to have had at least one son, Lucius Hedius Rufus Lollianus Avitus.

Only one office is known to be held by Avitus, proconsular governor of Asia in 128/129, which was considered the peak of a successful senatorial career.

Political offices
Preceded by Gaius Clodius Nummus, and Lucius Caesennius Sospes as consules suffecti	Suffect consul of the Roman Empire; 114 with Marcus Messius Rusticus	Succeeded by Lucius Vipstanus Messalla, and Marcus Pedo Vergilianus as consules ordinarii
