= Caecilia Trebulla =

2nd century Roman poet

Caecilia Trebulla was a poet of the Roman Empire, about whom little is known. She may have been an aristocrat based on assumptions made about the nature of her writing and knowledge of literary Greek. She wrote Greek iambic poetry, and the only remnants of her work are three epigrams inscribed upon the left leg of one of the Colossi of Memnon. She is believed to have first visited the statue in AD 130, and returned to have the next two poems inscribed upon it. Not much is known of her aside from the poems that she left behind on this monument, as she lived during a time where verses written by women were not typically published so she left her work as graffiti.

She was not the only poet to leave her mark on this monument, or even the only female poet to leave her mark, but the inscriptions left by female poets on Memnon's leg are almost 6% of the surviving works by women from the ancient world. It is likely that she did not inscribe her poem herself, but instead paid a local stonecutter to do it for her in memory of her visit after she composed each poem. A popular belief at the time was that the statue of Memnon sang to his mother Eos, the goddess of dawn, because the stones made a sound as they were warmed by the rising sun. It is possible that this sound inspired her to mention her own mother.

== Surviving poetry ==
1.

By Trebulla.

When I heard the holy voice of Memnon,

I longed for you, mother, and I prayed for you to hear it too.

2.

Caecilia Trebulla,

upon hearing Memnon for the second time.

Before we heard only his voice,

Today he greeted us as friends and intimates,

Memnon, son of Eos and Tithon.

Did Nature, creator of all,

Give perception and voice to stone?

3.

I, Caecilia Trebulla,

Wrote after hearing Memnon here.

Cambyses smashed me, this stone,

Made as a likeness of an Eastern king.

My voice of old was a lament, groaning

For Memnon's suffering, which Cambyses stole.

Today I cry sounds inarticulate and unintelligible

Remains of my former fate.
