= 115 Antioch earthquake =

115 earthquake centred near Antioch

- Location within Syria
- Local date: 13 December 115
- Local time: At night
- Magnitude: 7.5 M_{s}
- Epicentre: 36.1°N 36.1°E
- Areas affected: Anatolia, Syria in the Roman Empire
- Max. intensity: MMI XI (Extreme)
- Tsunami: Yes
- Casualties: ~260,000

An earthquake occurred in Antioch on 13 December 115 AD. It had an estimated magnitude of 7.5 on the surface-wave magnitude scale and an estimated maximum intensity of XI (Extreme) on the Mercalli intensity scale. Antioch and surrounding areas were devastated with a great loss of life and property. It triggered a local tsunami that badly damaged the harbour at Caesarea Maritima. The Roman emperor Trajan was caught in the earthquake, as was his successor Hadrian. Although the consul Marcus Pedo Vergilianus was killed, they escaped with only slight injuries and later began a program to rebuild the city.

== Tectonic setting ==
The site of Antioch lies close to the complex triple junction between the northern end of the Dead Sea Transform, the mainly transform boundary between the African plate and the Arabian plate, the southwestern end of the East Anatolian Fault, the mainly transform boundary between the Anatolian plate and the Arabian plate, and the northeastern end of the Cyprus Arc, the boundary between the Anatolian and African plates. The city lies on the Antakya Basin, part of the Amik Basin, filled by Pliocene-to-recent alluvial sediments. The area has been affected by many large earthquakes during the last 2,000 years.

The results of trenching over the northern part of the Dead Sea Transform indicate that three major earthquakes have occurred along the Missyaf segment of the fault since about 100 AD, the earliest of which may correlate with the 115 earthquake.

== Damage ==
The earthquake killed an estimated 260,000 people. The cities of Antioch, Daphne and Apamea were almost completely destroyed. Trees were uprooted and felled; people were thrown down to the ground. The Roman emperor Trajan was trapped under the rubble of his home but escaped with minor injuries.

An account of the earthquake was included by the writer Cassius Dio in his Roman History. He describes Antioch at that time as crowded with soldiers and many civilians that had travelled from all parts of the empire, because Trajan was wintering there. The earthquake began with a loud roaring sound, followed by intense shaking of the ground. Whole trees were thrown into the air, as were many of the inhabitants, causing great injury. Large numbers of people were killed by falling debris, while many others were trapped. The aftershocks that followed the earthquake for several days killed some of the survivors, while others that were trapped died of hunger. Trajan managed to get clear of the house he was staying in by leaving through a window and only suffered minor injuries. Because of the danger from aftershocks, he moved with his retinue to the open hippodrome.

The city of Apamea was also destroyed by the earthquake and Beirut suffered significant damage. The tsunami triggered by the earthquake affected the Lebanese coast, particularly at Caesarea and Yavneh. The harbour at Caesarea Maritima was probably destroyed by the tsunami, an interpretation based on the dating of a half metre thick tsunami deposit found outside the harbour.

== Aftermath ==
The restoration of Antioch was started by Trajan but seems to have been completed by Hadrian. Trajan had a copy of the statue of Tyche by Eutychides erected at the new theatre, to commemorate the rebuilding of the city. Almost all of the mosaics that have been found in Antioch date from after the earthquake.

== See also ==
- 526 Antioch earthquake
- 1872 Amik earthquake
- 2023 Turkey–Syria earthquakes
- List of earthquakes in Turkey
- List of earthquakes in the Levant
- List of historical earthquakes
- List of tsunamis
- List of natural disasters by death toll
