= Statia gens =

Ancient Roman family

The gens Statia was a minor plebeian family at ancient Rome. Members of this gens are first mentioned in the early decades of the Republic, but the name does not appear again in history until the time of Cicero. The Statii remained relatively undistinguished until the reign of Trajan, when Lucius Statius Aquila was raised to the consulship.

== Origin ==
The nomen Statius is of Oscan origin, and most of the Statii appearing in history before the late Republic were from Samnium or Lucania. Statius is a patronymic surname, derived from the Oscan praenomen Statius, without any change in morphology.

== Praenomina ==
The Statii used only the most common of praenomina: Lucius, Gaius, Marcus, Publius, Quintus, Titus, and Sextus, of which the first five were the most abundant at all periods of Roman history. Of these, the Statii used primarily Lucius, Gaius, and Marcus.

== Members ==
This list includes abbreviated praenomina. For an explanation of this practice, see filiation.

- Titus Statius, tribune of the plebs in 475 BC, along with his colleague, Lucius Caedicius, brought Spurius Servilius Structus to trial for his conduct of the battle against the Veientes at the Janiculum as consul the previous year. Servilius spoke vigorously in his defense, and with the support of his colleague, Aulus Verginius Tricostus, he was acquitted.
- Statius, one of the Samnite generals during the Social War, was afterward given Roman citizenship and admitted to the Roman Senate. Because of his wealth, he was proscribed by the triumvirs in 43 BC, though he was then eighty; after opening his doors and dispersing his fortune to all takers, he set his house alight, and perished; the fire then spread to adjacent parts of Rome. Some scholars identify him with Gaius Papius Mutilus, but others reject this identification.
- Statius, a freedman of Quintus Tullius Cicero, whom his brother Marcus felt too self-important, and too free with his opinions.
- Sextus Statius, a merchant recommended by Pompeius for a prefecture by Cicero when the latter was proconsul of Cilicia in 51 BC. Cicero declined to appoint Statius on principle, and anticipated Pompeius' dissatisfaction with his choice.
- Statius Sebosus, a geographer whose work was cited by Pliny the Elder. He might be the same Sebosus mentioned by Cicero as a friend of Catulus.
- Statia Q. f. Quinta, the wife of Gaius Papirius Masso, whose public career is recorded in an inscription dating between the death of Caesar and the Battle of Actium. He had been a military tribune, plebeian aedile, quaesitor judex, and curator frumenti.
- Lucius Statius, a maker of amphorae, whose works made their way to Rome, Gaul, Spain, and Africa. He may be the same potter whose mark is found on the remains of some statuary from Pompeii.
- Lucius Statius Ursulus, a native of Tolosa in Gallia Narbonensis, was a teacher of rhetoric in the time of Nero.
- Statius Proxumus, a tribune in the Praetorian Guard during the reign of Nero, and one of those secretly plotting the emperor's murder in AD 65, was sent to arrest and slay Plautius Lateranus, the consul designate, whose role in the conspiracy had been discovered. To his credit, Lateranus went to his death without exposing his executioner's role in the affair. At some point, Statius' participation was discovered, but he was pardoned. Tacitus implies that he vainly put an end to his own life, or in some way met his end through his own foolishness.
- Statius Domitius, or Domitius Statius, a tribune in the Praetorian Guard, who was removed from his position because he was suspected of being a participant in the Pisonian conspiracy.
- Statius Murcus, or perhaps Staius Murcus, like Caesar's legate, was one of two soldiers sent by Otho in AD 69 to kill Galba's heir, Lucius Calpurnius Piso Licinianus.
- Statius Sabinus, a friend of Pliny the Younger, and perhaps a relative, for both were among the heirs of a certain Sabina. Statius asked Pliny for advice concerning a slave named Modestus, whom Sabina apparently intended to order manumitted in her will, but on consulting with experts Pliny found that Sabina's intention had no legal effect. He nonetheless advised, and trusted that Statius would agree, that if they were worthy of Sabina's trust, then they should carry out her intention by freeing Modestus.
- Lucius Statius Aquila, consul in AD 116, during the reign of Trajan.
- Gaius Statius Capito Arrianus, one of the sons of senatorial families appointed to assist the Arval Brethren in AD 117. He was probably the same as Lucius Statius Capito, named in the same position for 118, and the brother of Gaius Statius Cerealis, who performed the same function in 120.
- Gaius Statius Cerealis, one of the sons of senatorial families appointed to assist the Arval Brethren in AD 120. He was probably the brother of Gaius Statius Capito Arrianus, who performed the same function in 117.
- Gaius Statius Capito, the owner of a brickworks in the time of Hadrian, might be the same person as Gaius Statius Capito Arrianus, or perhaps his father.
- Statius Valens, said by Lampridius, one of the writers of the Historia Augusta, to have written a life of Trajan. He is not mentioned by any other source.
- Lucius Statius Quadratus, consul in AD 142. He was proconsul of Asia about 155, and presided over the trial of Polycarp, the Bishop of Smyrna.
- Publius Statius P. f. Paullus Postumius Junior, followed a distinguished career during the middle portion of the second century, serving as a military tribune in the Legio VII Gemina, quaestor in Africa, tribune of the plebs, praetor, and governor of Bithynia and Pontus and Hispania Baetica.
- Marcus Statius M. f. Priscus Licinius Italicus, governor of Dacia, then consul in AD 159. He was subsequently governor of several other provinces, including Moesia Superior, Britannia, and Cappadocia. He successfully led the Roman forces against the Parthians, capturing Artaxata. After he warned Marcus Aurelius of the revolt of Avidius Cassius, Statius was appointed governor of Syria.
- Statius Rufinus, who had undertaken the construction of a theatre at Gabii in Latium, was sentenced to three years' exile by the praefectus urbi, in during the reigns of Marcus Aurelius and Lucius Verus.
- Statia Agrippina, the wife of Modius Justus, the governor of Numidia in AD 171, should perhaps be read Statilia Agrippina.
- Publius Statius Julianus Paelignianus, a man of senatorial rank, named in an inscription from Brixia in Venetia and Histria, dating to the late second or early third century.
- Statius Longinus, a man of consular rank, was governor of Moesia Inferior under Macrinus. He is named on a number of coins from Nicopolis on the Ister. He might be the same as Marcus Statius Longinus.
- Marcus Statius Longinus, a man of senatorial rank, named among the patrons of Canusium in AD 223. He might be the same person as the former consul who was governor of Moesia Superior under Macrinus.
- Marcus Statius Longinus Junior, probably the son of Marcus Statius Longinus, was also listed among the senatorial patrons of Canusium in AD 223.
- Marcus Statius Patruinus, listed among the senatorial patrons of Canusium in AD 223, was probably the brother or son of Marcus Statius Longinus.
- Lucius Statius L. f. Prosper Julianus, a man of senatorial rank, was decemvir stlitibus judicandis, and patron of the colony at Praeneste in Latium, where he presented an offering to Jupiter Arcanus at some point in the third century.
- Statius Julianus, an eques who served as curator rei publicae at Caesena in Cisalpine Gaul during the reigns of Probus or Carus.
- Statius Rufinus, praefectus urbi of Rome from 13 April 308 to 30 October 309.
- Statius Tullianus, the author of several books on the meaning of words. His period when he lived is uncertain, but certainly no later than the first half of the fourth century.

== See also ==
- List of Roman gentes

== Bibliography ==
- Marcus Tullius Cicero, Epistulae ad Atticum, Epistulae ad Familiares, Epistulae ad Quintum Fratrem.
- Dionysius of Halicarnassus, Romaike Archaiologia.
- Titus Livius (Livy), History of Rome.
- Gaius Plinius Secundus (Pliny the Elder), Historia Naturalis (Natural History).
- Gaius Plinius Caecilius Secundus (Pliny the Younger), Epistulae (Letters).
- Publius Cornelius Tacitus, Annales, Historiae.
- Lucius Mestrius Plutarchus (Plutarch), Lives of the Noble Greeks and Romans.
- Gaius Suetonius Tranquillus, De Claris Rhetoribus (On the Eminent Orators).
- Lucius Cassius Dio (Cassius Dio), Roman History.
- Gaius Julius Solinus, De Mirabilis Mundi (On the Wonders of the World).
- Aelius Lampridius, Aelius Spartianus, Flavius Vopiscus, Julius Capitolinus, Trebellius Pollio, and Vulcatius Gallicanus, Historia Augusta (Lives of the Emperors).
- Digesta, or Pandectae (The Digest).
- Dictionary of Greek and Roman Biography and Mythology, William Smith, ed., Little, Brown and Company, Boston (1849).
- Theodor Mommsen et alii, Corpus Inscriptionum Latinarum (The Body of Latin Inscriptions, abbreviated CIL), Berlin-Brandenburgische Akademie der Wissenschaften (1853–present).
- August Pauly, Georg Wissowa, et alii, Realencyclopädie der Classischen Altertumswissenschaft (Scientific Encyclopedia of the Knowledge of Classical Antiquities, abbreviated RE or PW), J. B. Metzler, Stuttgart (1894–1980).
- George Davis Chase, "The Origin of Roman Praenomina", in Harvard Studies in Classical Philology, vol. VIII, pp. 103–184 (1897).
- Paul von Rohden, Elimar Klebs, & Hermann Dessau, Prosopographia Imperii Romani (The Prosopography of the Roman Empire, abbreviated PIR), Berlin (1898).
- T. Robert S. Broughton, The Magistrates of the Roman Republic, American Philological Association (1952–1986).
- Géza Alföldy, Konsulat und Senatorenstand unter der Antonien (The Consulate and Senatorial State under the Antonines), Rudolf Habelt, Bonn (1977).
- Ronald Syme, "The Proconsuls of Asia under Antoninus Pius", in Zeitschrift für Papyrologie und Epigraphik, No. 51 (1983).
