= Messia gens =

The gens Messia was a plebeian family at Rome. The first person of this name to appear in history is Vettius Messius, a Volscian soldier whose courage inspired his comrades in a desperate battle against the Romans in 431 BC. It is not known when the Messii first obtained Roman citizenship. Members of the family appear in the lists of annual magistrates during the final decades of the Republic. In imperial times, some of the Messii achieved the highest offices of the Roman state.

== Members ==
This list includes abbreviated praenomina. For an explanation of this practice, see filiation.

- Vettius Messius, (Note: "Vectius" in some manuscripts.) a Volscian warrior of humble origin, who in 431 BC rallied his countrymen against the Roman army under the command of the dictator Aulus Postumius Tubertus. So fiercely did the Volsci fight that the outcome of the battle was in doubt for some time, but the Romans prevailed; the fate of Vettius Messius is unknown.
- Gaius Messius, tribune of the plebs in 57 BC, introduced a bill to recall Cicero from exile, and passed a law granting Gnaeus Pompeius control over the grain supply. He was plebeian aedile in 54, and defended by Cicero in the same year. During the Civil War, he served as one of Caesar's lieutenants in Africa.
- Gaius Messius C. f., a soldier from Berytus, who participated in the Siege of Masada during the First Jewish–Roman War. He might have been a cavalryman serving with the Legio X Fretensis.
- Messius Maximus, a close friend of Pliny the Younger, who addressed a number of letters to him. Messius was an author, whose work Pliny admired, and whose advice he sought upon his own writing.
- Marcus Messius Rusticus, consul suffectus from September to December in AD 114.
- Gaius Messius Quintus Trajanus Decius, emperor from AD 249 to 251.
- Quintus Herennius Etruscus Messius C. f. Decius, better known simply as "Herennius Etruscus", was the son of Decius, and briefly ruled alongside his father until they were both slain in battle, in AD 251.
- Gaius Valens Hostilianus Messius C. f. Quintus, generally believed to have been the son of Decius, (Note: Zosimus says that Decius was succeeded by a second son, whom he does not name; but various inconsistencies in the records of this time have led some historians to suppose that Hostilian was Decius' son-in-law, or perhaps his nephew. For some of the arguments put forth supporting each view, see Tillemont and Eckhel.) succeeded to the empire on the deaths of his father and brother, in AD 251, reigning alongside Trebonianus Gallus. Hostilian died later the same year, either in an epidemic, or betrayed by his colleague.
- Messius Arusianus, (Note: Or "Messus".) a Latin grammarian who flourished at the end of the fourth century.
- Messius Phoebus Severus, consul in AD 470, under the emperor Anthemius, who granted him the rank of Patricius, and appointed him praefectus urbi. He restored parts of the Colosseum, and according to Damascius, Severus and the emperor planned to restore Rome's pagan cults.

== See also ==
- List of Roman gentes

== Bibliography ==
- Marcus Tullius Cicero, Epistulae ad Atticum, Post Reditum in Senatu.
- Gaius Julius Caesar, (attributed), De Bello Africo (On the African War).
- Titus Livius (Livy), Ab Urbe Condita (History of Rome).
- Gaius Plinius Caecilius Secundus (Pliny the Younger), Epistulae (Letters).
- Eusebius of Caesarea, Historia Ecclesiastica.
- Eutropius, Breviarium Historiae Romanae (Abridgement of the History of Rome).
- Sextus Aurelius Victor, De Caesaribus (On the Caesars), Epitome de Caesaribus (attributed).
- Aelius Lampridius, Aelius Spartianus, Flavius Vopiscus, Julius Capitolinus, Trebellius Pollio, and Vulcatius Gallicanus, Historia Augusta (Augustan History).
- Zosimus, Historia Nova (New History).
- Damascius, Vita Isidori (The Life of Isidore), summarized by Photius in the Bibliotheca.
- Jordanes, Romana.
- Joannes Zonaras, Epitome Historiarum (Epitome of History).
- Louis-Sébastien Le Nain de Tillemont, Histoire des Empereurs et des Autres Princes qui ont Régné Durant les Six Premiers Siècles de l’Église (History of the Emperors and Other Princes who Ruled During the First Six Centuries of the Church), Chez Rollin Fils, Paris (1690–1697, 1701, 1738).
- Joseph Hilarius Eckhel, Doctrina Numorum Veterum (The Study of Ancient Coins, 1792–1798).
- Dictionary of Greek and Roman Biography and Mythology, William Smith, ed., Little, Brown and Company, Boston (1849).
- René Cagnat et alii, L'Année épigraphique (The Year in Epigraphy, abbreviated AE), Presses Universitaires de France (1888–present).
- T. Robert S. Broughton, The Magistrates of the Roman Republic, American Philological Association (1952).
- Michael Speidel, "Roman Army Pay Scales", in Journal of Roman Studies, vol. LXXXII, pp. 87–106 (1992).
