= Civitas Tropaensium =

Roman castrum in Constanţa, Romania

Coordinates: 44°05′31″N 27°56′39″E

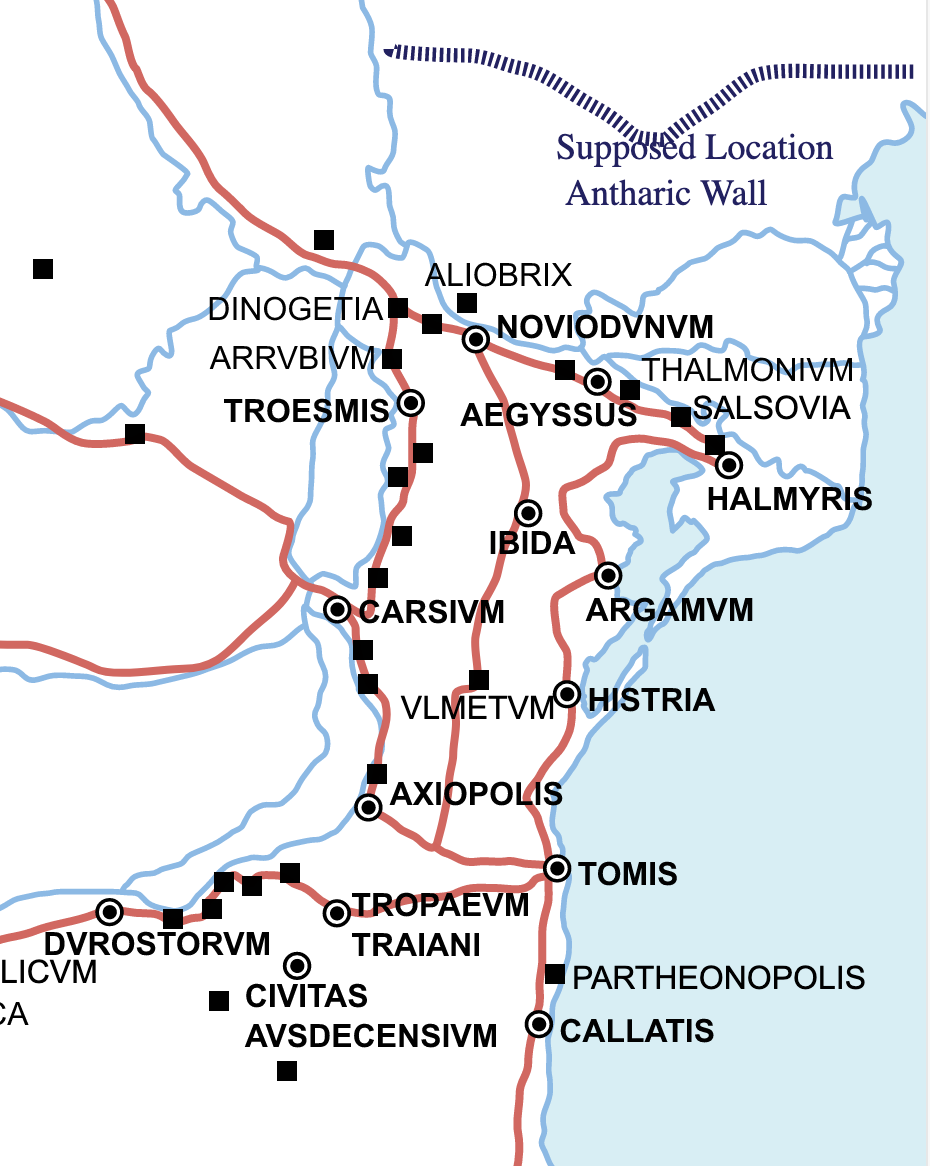
Cities and roads in eastern Moesia

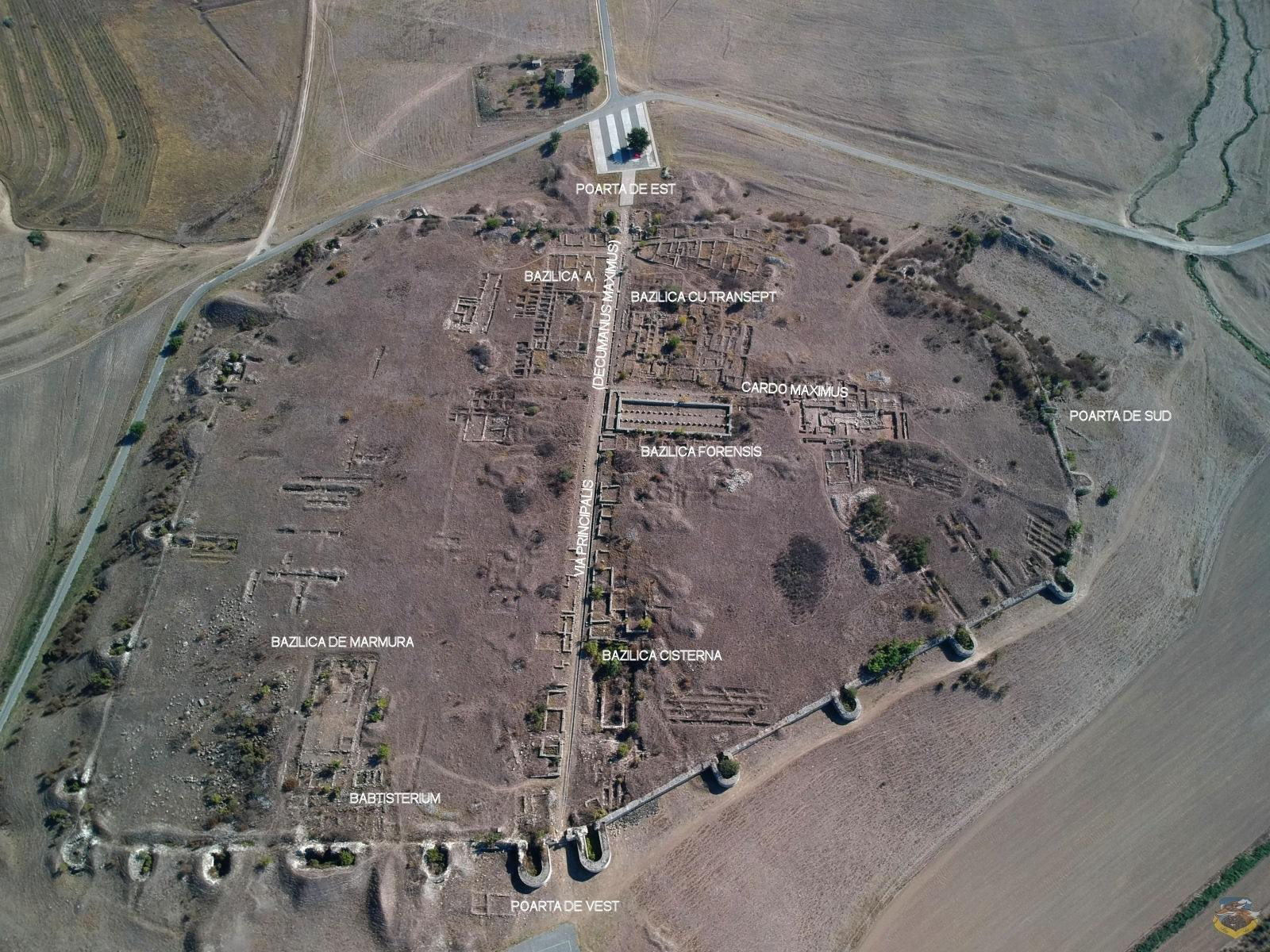
Civitas Tropaensium

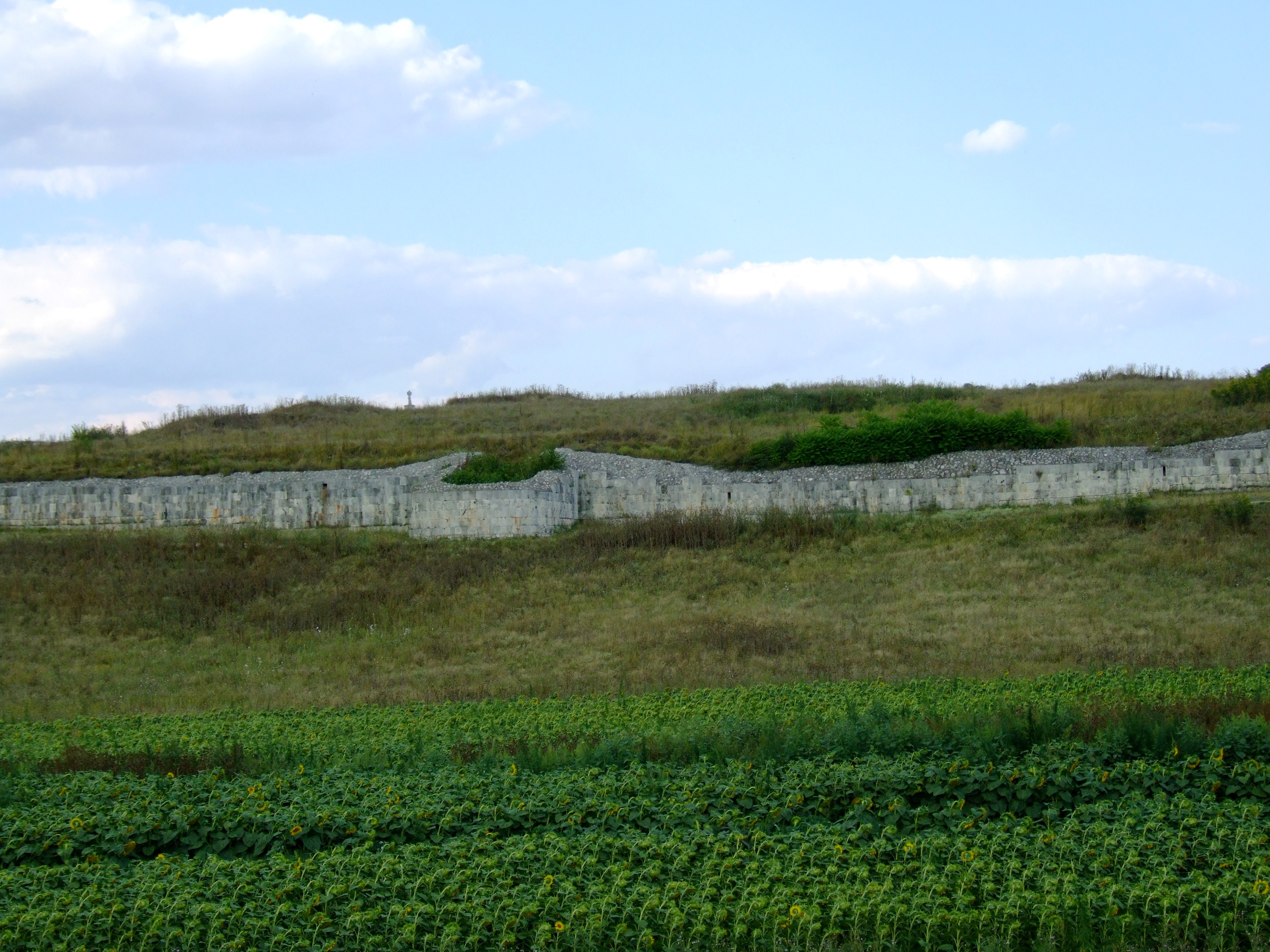
Civitas Tropaensium city wall

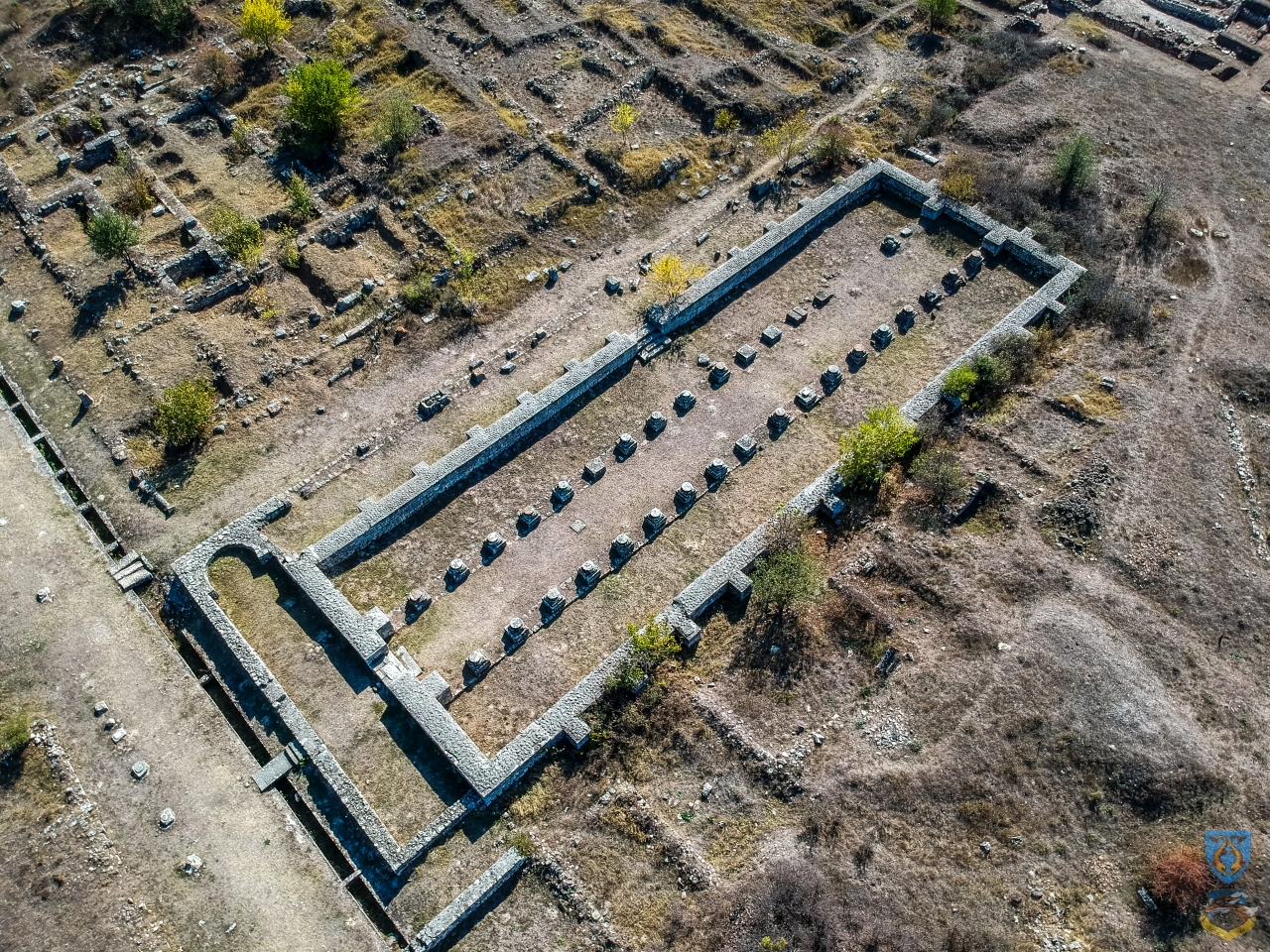
Basilica

Civitas Tropaensium or Tropaeum Traiani (its Roman name) was a Roman city situated in the Roman province of Moesia (later Scythia Minor) near modern Adamclisi in Constanța County, Romania. It was named after Trajan's Trophy (Tropaeum Traiani) built nearby.

== History ==
A native settlement originally occupied the site. The area had come under Roman rule from 27 BC and became part of the client kingdom of the Odrysians, but subsequent raids by the Dacians brought further Roman counteractions until the Roman province of Moesia was created in about 6 AD and the Moesian Limes defensive frontier along the Danube had been started. However, this region remained part of the Odrysian kingdom under the name Ripa Thraciae. In 46 AD the area was absorbed into the province of Moesia.

In the winter of 101 to 102 during Trajan's First Dacian War, and after the Dacians had crossed the frozen Danube in a counterattack, the Battle of Adamclisi was a major clash fought nearby resulting in a decisive Roman victory, though both sides suffered very heavy casualties. The Romans built a monumental altar on the hill overlooking the settlement and about 2km east of it in 102 to commemorate the victory.

In 109 AD, after Trajan's Second Dacian War and the Dacians had been finally subdued, the Tropaeum Traiani was built next to the altar to commemorate the Roman Empire's victories over the Dacians, like Trajan's Column in Rome. It gave its name to the Roman walled city probably also built around 109. The city was colonised with Roman veterans of the Dacian Wars, and was made a municipium.

The city was destroyed by the Costoboci in 170 in the Marcomannic Wars, after Legio V Macedonica was moved from Troesmis, as shown by funerary inscriptions of Lucius Fufidius Iulianus, a decurion and duumvir (magistrate) of the city, and of a man named Daizus. Vexillations of the legions I Italica and V Macedonica were deployed at Tropaeum in this period, perhaps to defend against these attacks. It was rebuilt under the Severan dynasty (193-235) though was again destroyed by the Carpi (Goths) in 238, and again substantially rebuilt during Constantine the Great's rule with improved defensive walls.

The city survived until the Avars sacked it in 587 when the Avar Hagan, although he had promised peace with the Empire for which he received 100,000 gold coins, violated the treaty and conquered Tropaeum Traiani "through a military action which gave him a lot of work, because the cities did not surrender easily". It then ceased to be an important city of Dobruja and was no longer mentioned for seven hundred years.

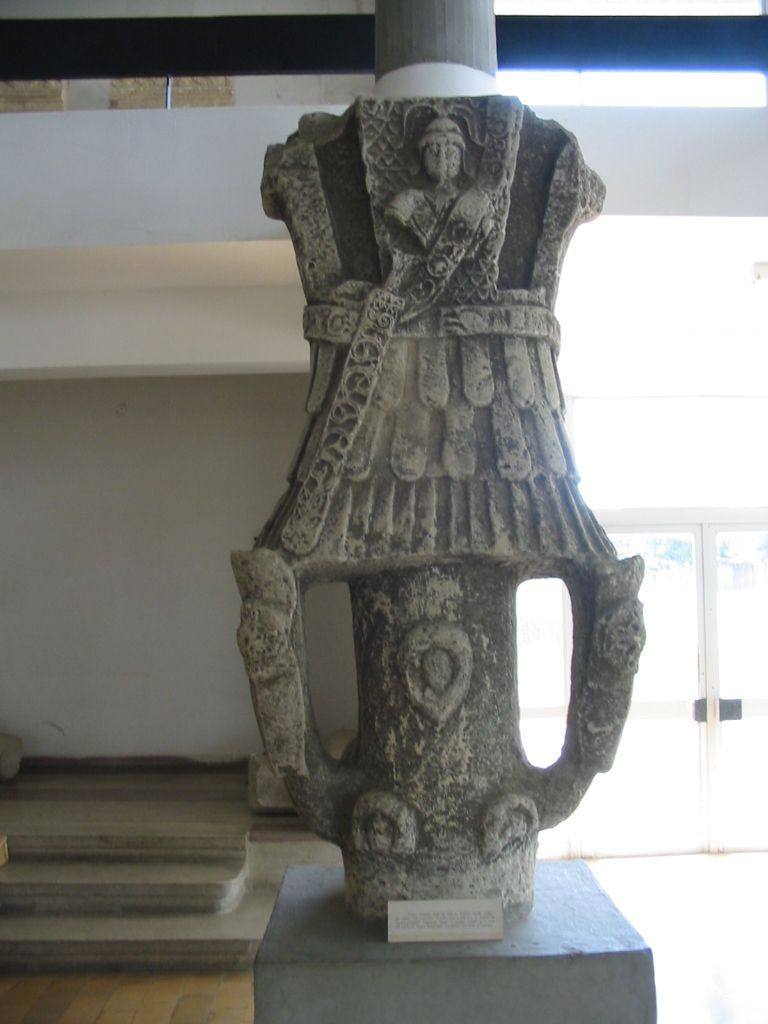
A smaller copy of the original monument from the eastern city gates made in the era of Constantine and Licinius

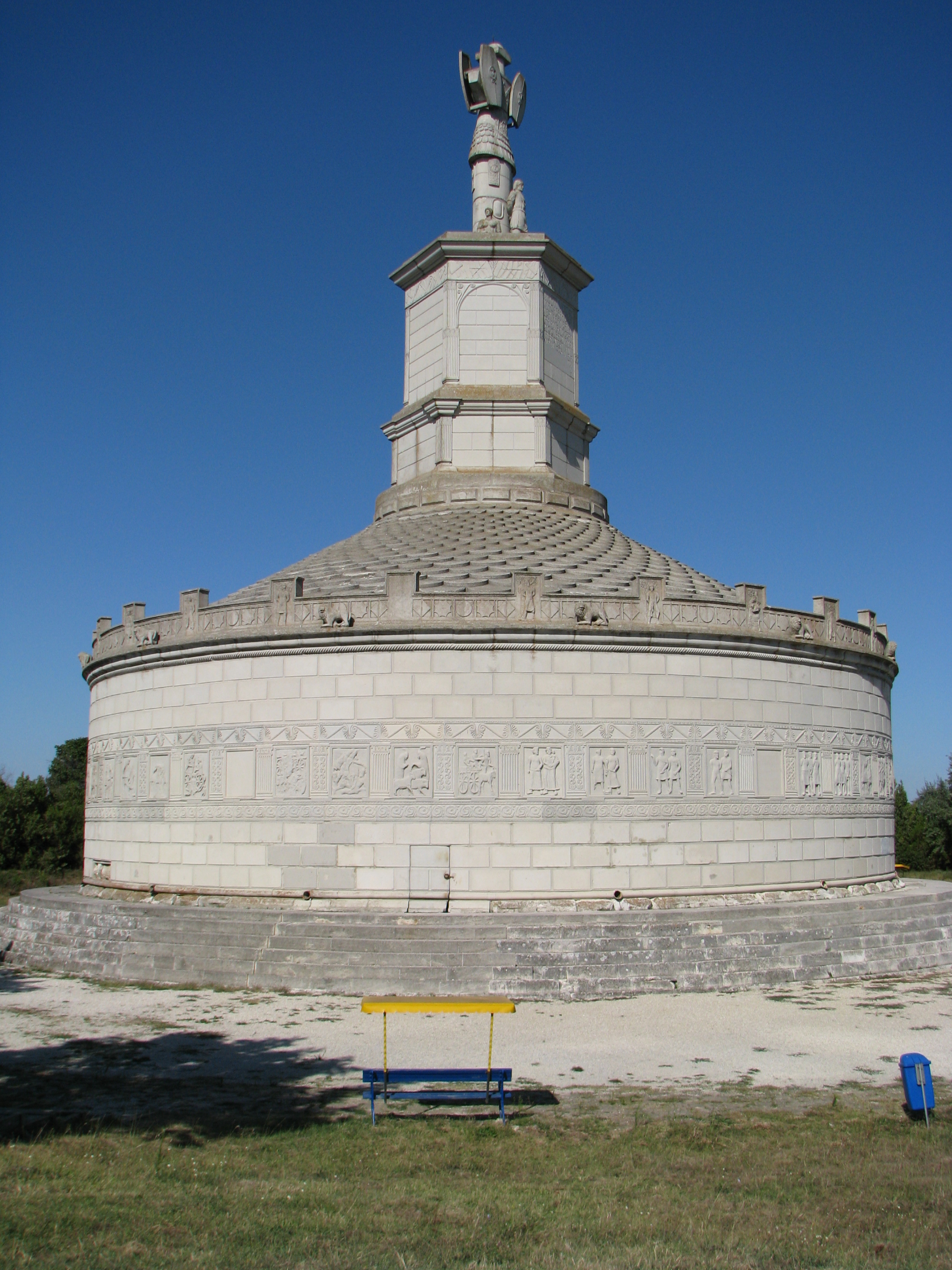
Tropaeum Traiani

== The city ==
The main, east, gate to the city was built under Trajan with two rectangular towers as at other Moesian cities. Under Septimius Severus (r.193 to 211) it was rebuilt with a double gate and a square internal tower. In 316 under Constantine and Licinius it was extensively rebuilt with horseshoe-shaped towers and a smaller version (2.9 m high) of Trajan's Trophy added to it, emphasising the lasting importance of the battles won here.

The main street rebuilt at the beginning of the 4th century has a well-preserved central drain for rain and wastewater, unusual for incorporating a step on which was a ceramic pipeline for water supply.

Four Christian basilicas have been excavated.
