= Fețele Albe Dacian fortress =

- Location within Romania
- 45.62611°N 23.28000°E
- Location: Dealul Muncelului, Grădiștea de Munte, Hunedoara, Romania

History
- Event: Trajan's Dacian Wars

Site notes
- Excavation dates: 1969
- Archaeologists: Ioan Glodariu; Hadrian Daicoviciu
- Condition: Ruined

Monument istoric
- Reference no.: HD-I-s-A-03196

Feţele Albe is a Dacian fortified settlement on the southern side of Muncelului Hill, situated north of Sarmizegetusa Regia, separated from it by a sharp declivity. Along with numerous walls and resulting terraces, the site contained a sanctuary with circular stone pillars on the third terrace. The settlement was destroyed during the First Dacian War, rebuilt and again destroyed by fire by Trajan's army during the Second Dacian War in 106 CE. The Romans then built a military camp (castrum) on the site.
