= Fețele Albe =

Feţele Albe may refer to:

- Feţele Albe Dacian fortress, a Dacian fortified settlement
- Feţele Albe castra, a fort in the Roman province of Dacia
