= Lucius Licinius Sura =

Late 1st/early 2nd century Roman senator, consul and governor

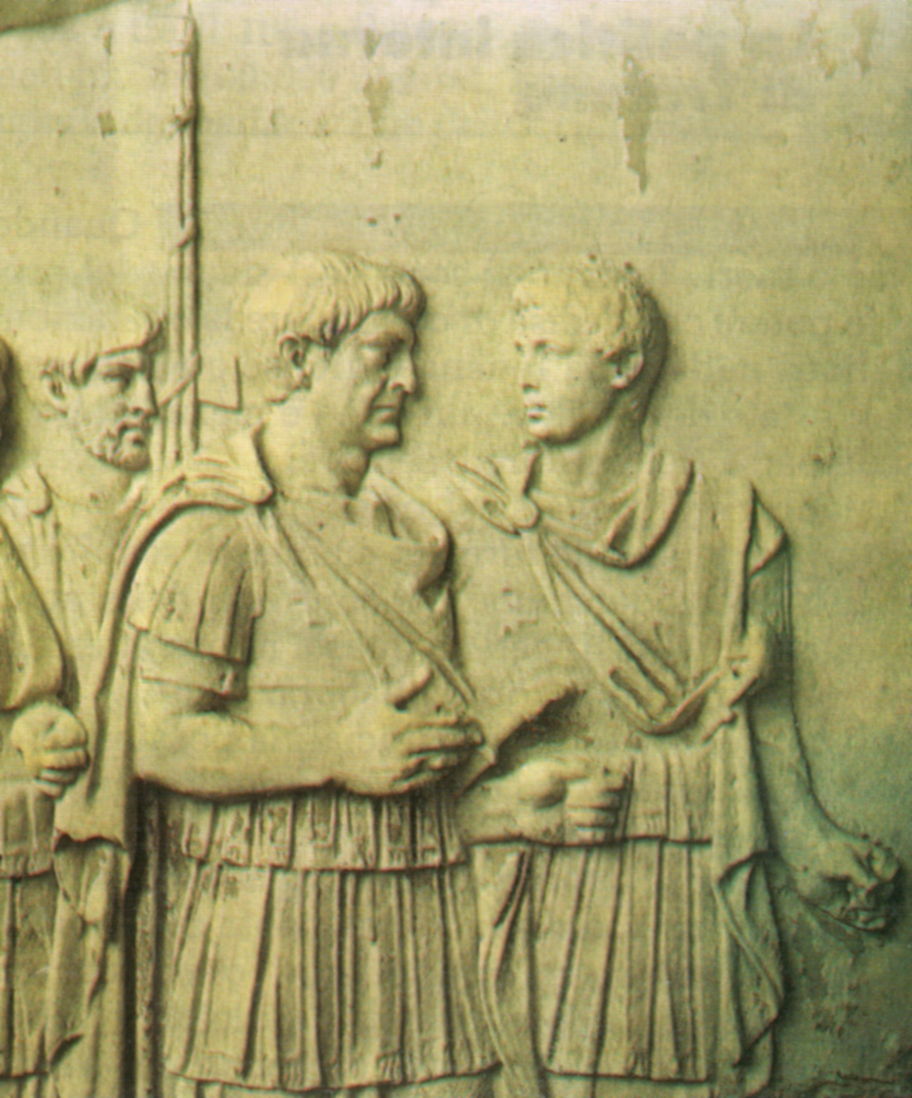
Trajan's Column, Trajan in conversation with a general (perhaps Lucius Licinius Sura).

Lucius Licinius Sura was an influential Roman Senator from Tarraco, Hispania, a close friend of the Emperor Trajan and three times consul, in a period when three consulates were very rare for non-members of the Imperial family. The dates of two of these consulates are certain: in 102 and 107 AD he was consul ordinarius; the date of his first consulate, as a suffect consul has been debated. Fausto Zevi postulated that he was also suffect consul in 97, based on a plausible restoration of part of the Fasti Ostienses, which reads "..]us". However, two more recently recovered fragments of military diplomas show that the name of this consul is L. Pomponius Maternus, who is otherwise unknown. Most authorities have returned to endorsing C.P. Jones' surmise that Sura was consul for the first time in the year 93. However, Werner Eck now regards him as the likely colleague of Tacitus for the last nundinum of 97. Sura was a correspondent of Pliny the Younger.

== Life ==
He was mentioned by a number of contemporary writers, who provide hints about his personality. The earliest mention of Sura are in three of Martial's epigrams. In the first (I.49), addressed to Licinianus of Bilbilis in 85/86, Sura is described as wealthy. The second (VI.64) is published in 89/90, wherein Martial defends his trifles against criticism by appealing to the highest authorities, who include, besides Sura, Silius Italicus, consul in 68, Marcus Aquilius Regulus, and the emperor himself. The third, dated to the year 92, congratulates Sura on recovering from a serious illness (VII.47); Ronald Syme speculates that Sura was one of the victims of an epidemic that followed one of the Dacian Wars. Arrian, in his Life of Epictetus, has the title character refer to a rich catamite belonging to Sura. A third writer is Pliny the Younger, who addressed two letters to Sura on scientific matters.

Licinius Sura was a close and trusted companion of the emperor Trajan, and Cassius Dio tells how Trajan proved his fidelity: one day, without prior notice, he went to Sura's house; then, after dismissing his bodyguard, Trajan bathed, had Sura shave him, and dined with him. The following day he said to those who had disparaged Sura: "If Sura had desired to kill me, he would have killed me yesterday." How Sura came to be a trusted companion is unclear. Edmund Groag surmised that it was Sura who suggested Trajan's name as an heir to the emperor Nerva after the latter was confronted by a mutiny by the Praetorian Guard. However, this view has been challenged: when discussing the details of Nerva's choice of Trajan as an heir in October 97, John D. Grainger simply omits all mention of Groag's theory. Werner Eck now supports Groag's point of view.

During the first campaign against the Dacians, after the Second Battle of Tapae, Trajan dispatched Sura and Tiberius Claudius Livianus to negotiate peace with the Dacian king Decebalus. Nothing was accomplished, since Decebalus did not meet them, but sent envoys instead on this occasion. Nevertheless, because the Romans captured key strongpoints in the mountains and Decebalus' sister was captured, the Dacians agreed to the terms the Romans demanded and peace was agreed to between the Romans and Dacians. For this, Sura was appointed to a second consulate as consul ordinarius in 102 as the colleague of Lucius Julius Ursus Servianus. He also participated in Trajan's second campaign against the Dacians; while his role in that war is undetermined, it was important enough for Sura to be awarded triumphal ornaments and a third consulate in 107 with Quintus Sosius Senecio as his colleague.

Sura vanishes from the public record after his third consulate; Syme believes he died in 108. According to Cassius Dio, Trajan gave him a public funeral and had a statue erected in Sura's memory.

== See also ==
- Licinia gens
- Baths of Licinius Sura

Political offices
Preceded by Lucius Arruntius Stella, and Lucius Julius Marinus Caecilius Simplex as Suffect consuls	Consul of the Roman Empire; 102 with Lucius Julius Ursus Servianus II	Succeeded by Lucius Julius Ursus Servianus II, and Lucius Fabius Justus
Preceded by Lucius Minicius Natalis, and Quintus Licinius Silvanus Granianus Quadronius Proculus	Consul of the Roman Empire; 107 with Quintus Sosius Senecio II	Succeeded by Quintus Sosius Senecio II, and Acilius Rufus
