= Gaius Minicius Fundanus =

Roman senator and consul of the early 2nd century AD

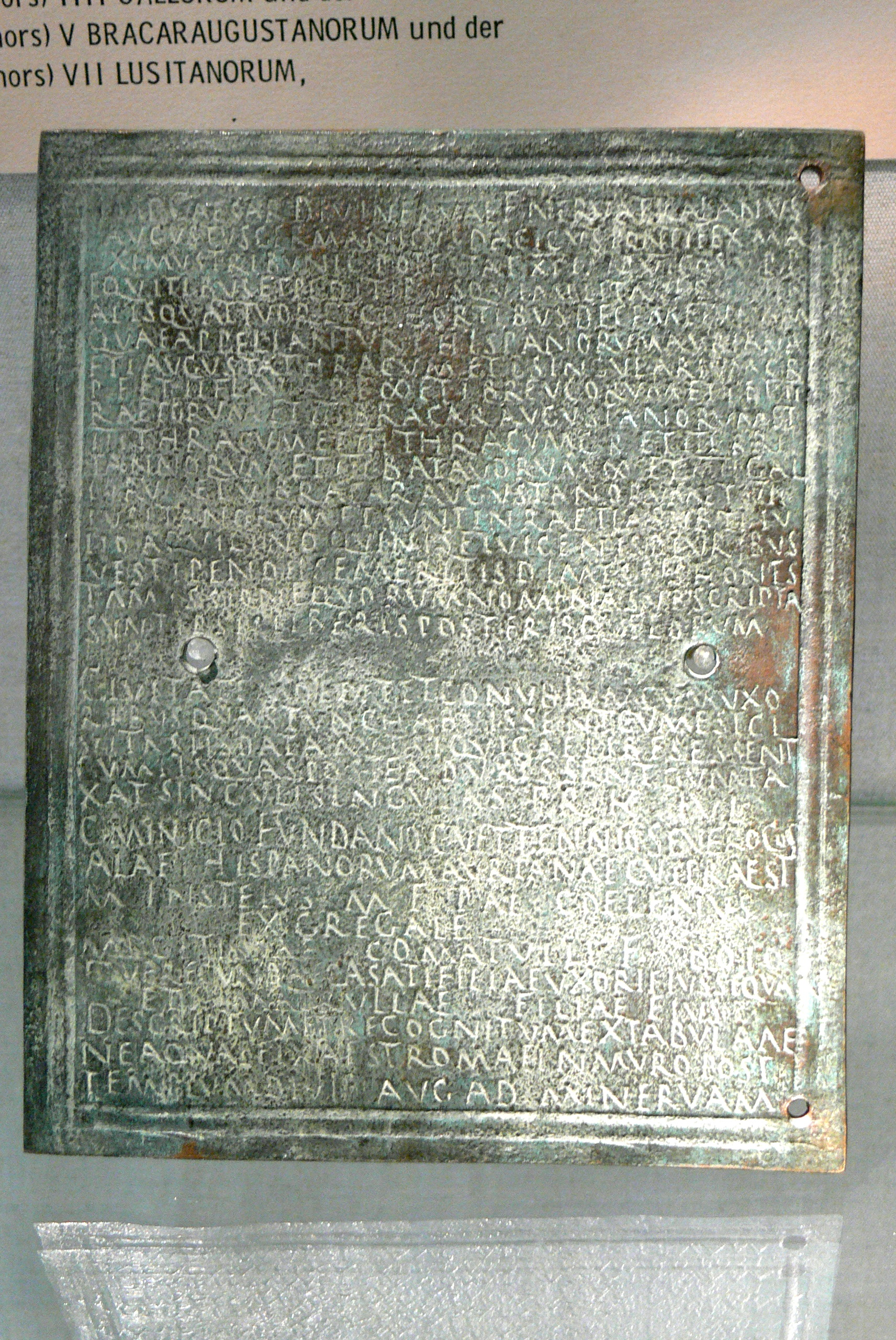
- Military diploma CIL XVI, 55, dated June 30th 107, attesting his consulship

suffect consul
- In office c. May 107 AD – c. August 107 AD

Governor of Asia
- In office c. 122 AD – c. 123 AD
- Preceded by: Q. Licinius Silvanus Granianus
- Succeeded by: Quintus Pompeius Falco

Personal details
- Born: c. 1st century AD Roman Empire
- Died: c. 123 AD Roman Empire
- Occupation: politician

Gaius Minicius Fundanus was a Roman senator who held several offices in the Emperor's service, and was an acquaintance of Pliny the Younger. He was suffect consul in the nundinium of May to August 107 AD with Titus Vettennius Severus as his colleague. Fundanus is best known as being the recipient of an edict from the emperor Hadrian about conducting trials of Christians in his province.

== Life ==
The earliest offices Fundanus held are known from an inscription recovered from Baloie (modern Šipovo) in Bosnia. The first office listed is military tribune with Legio XII Fulminata. Next is quaestor, and upon completion of this traditional Republican magistracy he would be enrolled in the Senate. Two more of the traditional Republican magistracies followed: plebeian tribune and praetor. The last appointment, before the inscription breaks off, was his commission as legatus legionis or commander of Legio XV Apollinaris; Everett L. Wheeler dates his tenure with this unit to the 90s of this era.

Other sources attest that Fundanus was governor of Achaea, but the year is uncertain. We can narrow the possible dates he was governor a little: the terminus post quem his governorship started was 101, when Gaius Caristanius Julianus is known to have governed; and the terminus ante quem he left his post is the year of his consulate, although the letters he received from Pliny indicate he was no longer in Achaea, allowing us to adjust the date ante quem as early as the year 103. The inscription from Baloie mentions he had been admitted to the Septemviri epulonum, one of the four most prestigious ancient Roman priesthoods; because this inscription does not mention his consulate, it can be assumed his entrance preceded that office.

Most, if not all, of the letters Pliny wrote to Fundanus fall before he was suffect consul. In the first letter of his collection, Pliny declares that living on his rural estate is preferable to living in Rome where he is subject to constant pleas for assistance; Ronald Syme dates most of the material in that section of Pliny's collection to the year 97, but notes some "can or should be assigned to the next year." The second letter petitions him to appoint the son of Pliny's friend Asinius Rufus to serve as Fundanus' quaestor for Fundanus' upcoming consulate; Syme dates the letters from this part of Pliny's collection as "embracing the years 103-5." The last letter is another petition to Fundanus, canvassing him on behalf of Julius Naso, who is running for an unnamed office; Syme notes that letters from this part of the collection can be dated to the years 105 to 107. While all of these letters demonstrate the two men were acquainted, they fail to show the warmth of a friendship.

Following his consulate, during the reign of Trajan, Fundanus was governor of Dalmatia. Although the term would fall sometime after 107, Werner Eck suggests that a date closer to 108 to 111 is more likely.

== Procedure and Christians ==
It is through a rescript the historian Eusebius preserves at length in his Ecclesiae Historia that we know Fundanus was proconsul of Asia. Eck dates his tenure to 122/123. Fundanus' predecessor, Quintus Licinius Silvanus Granianus, had asked Hadrian how to handle legal cases where some inhabitants were accusing their neighbors of being Christians through "informers or mere clamour". Hadrian's reply was to state that any such accusations had to be through a law court, where the matter could be properly investigated, and if they are "guilty of any illegality, you [Fundanus] must pronounce sentence according to the seriousness of the offence".

This rescript is important as an independent witness to the existence of Christian communities in this part of Anatolia in the early second century. The only other contemporaneous evidence we have for these communities is the list of the seven churches of Asia in the book of Revelation (2:1-3:22).

== Family ==
Fundanus' wife was Statoria Marcella, the daughter of a Marcus Statorius. We know her name from a funerary inscription, which suggests that she died before Fundanus' consulship. The name of their daughter, Minicia Marcella, comes from two independent sources. Minicia died young: her funerary vase has been identified, which states her age at death as twelve years, eleven months, and seven days. Pliny also attests to her existence, revealing information about the girl that shows that he and Fundanus were better friends than the surviving letters he wrote Fundanus suggest. In the letter, addressed to one Aefulanus Marcellinus, Pliny notes that, although she was not yet fourteen years old, she was betrothed; he describes the preparations for her wedding, with which Fundanus was busy; and he asks Marcellinus to send Fundanus a letter consoling him for his loss. It is not known if Fundanus and Statoria had any other children.

Political offices
Preceded by Acilius Rufus, and Quintus Sosius Senecio II	Consul of the Roman Empire; 107 with Titus Vettennius Severus	Succeeded by Gaius Julius Longinus, and Gaius Valerius Paullinus
