= Acilius Rufus =

Early 2nd century Roman senator and suffect consul

Acilius Rufus is the name of a Roman senator, who was suffect consul in the nundinium of March to April 107; it unclear which consul ordinarius of the year Rufus replaced, Lucius Licinius Sura or Quintus Sosius Senecio. The expert consensus agrees that Rufus should be identified with the Acilius Rufus whom Pliny the Younger mentions in his letters on the trial of Varenus Rufus who was prosecuted for malfeasance while governor of Bithynia and Pontus.

There is disagreement over identifying Acilius Rufus the consul with one Lucius Acilius Rufus, a senator known from an inscription from Thermae Himeraeae. This inscription attests that this Acilius Rufus held the traditional republican magistracies of quaestor of Sicilia, plebeian tribune, praetor, and prefect of the frumenti dandi ex senatus consultum. Although there appears to be no reason not to identify this person with the consul, Ronald Syme objects arguing that the first suffect consul of a year was a very prestigious post, and that having been quaestor of Sicilia and prefect of the frumenti dandi, Acilius Rufus lacked sufficient esteem for him to achieve that prestigious rank of suffect consuls. As a result, he notes the existence of one Marcus Acilius Rufus of Saguntum who was an imperial procurator, and proposes that a hypothetical descendant of this procurator was suffect consul for this nundinium of 107.

Despite his proven discernment for the evidence, Syme appears to depend too heavily on an argument from silence—especially as we know so little about many consuls of this time—to not allow for the vagaries of life. In this case, Licinius Sura vanishes from the record after his consulate, so it is possible he died unexpectedly in March 107 and the consular Acilius Rufus, who is attested as replacing a single consul, may have been selected at the last moment to complete the nundinium. In any case, lack of evidence prevents more than guesses.

Political offices
Preceded by Lucius Licinius Sura III, and Quintus Sosius Senecio II as ordinary consuls	Suffect consul of the Roman Empire; 107	Succeeded by Gaius Minicius Fundanus, and Titus Vettennius Severus as suffect consuls
