= Tiberius Claudius Livianus =

Roman eques and general

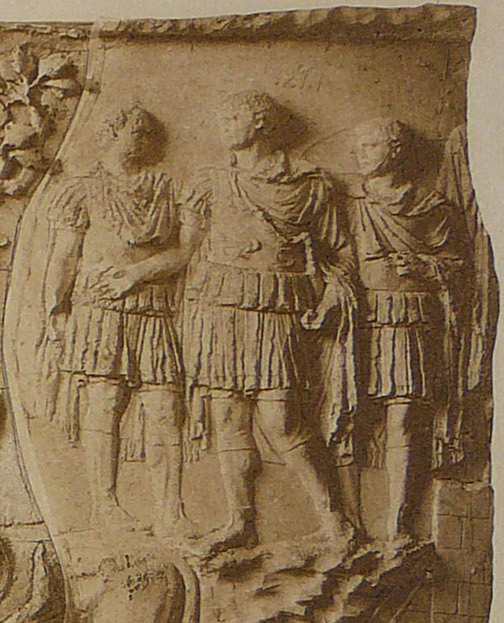
Detail of Trajan's Column: in the middle, Trajan; on the right, Licinius Sura; on the left, either Claudius Livianus, or a young Hadrian

Tiberius Claudius Livianus was an eques and general who was appointed praetorian prefect by Trajan, playing an important role in his First Dacian War, and continued as prefect into the reign of Hadrian. His full name, as attested in an inscription found in Rome, is Tiberius Julius Aquilinus Castricius Saturninus Claudius Livianus.

Ronald Syme argues that Livianus came from Sidyma in Lycia, "where his presumed parent made a dedication to Claudius Caesar." Based on his full, polyonomous name, Syme further suggests two relatives for Livianus: he shares the first three elements of his name with the procurator of Rhaetia around 107, Tiberius Julius Aquilinus; he also shares the fourth and fifth elements with a procurator of Africa in office c. 85, Castricius Saturninus.

== Life ==
The earliest historical mention of Livianus is in the epigrams of Martial. The subject of one epigram from book IX, whose publication is dated to the year 94, is the beauty of twin boys, Hierus and Asillus; Surviving inscription inform us that they were his slaves. Otherwise, the earliest mention is when Trajan appointed Livinianus praetorian prefect in 101, to aid in the prosecution of the Dacian War; the following year Livianus and Lucius Licinius Sura were entrusted on a mission to negotiate peace with the Dacian king, Decebalus, "but nothing was accomplished, since Decebalus did not dare to meet them."

There are intermittent glimpses of Livianus after the conclusion of the Dacian Wars. A fragment of a bronze tablet dated January 108 contains Livianus' name. He is surmised as one of Hadrian's close companions about the time of Trajan's Parthian campaign, although he may have been replaced as praetorian prefect by Servius Sulpicius Similis before that time. A clay yard stamp known as an opus figlinae has been recovered bearing his name and the consuls for the year 123.

It is unknown how much later than that stamp Livianus lived. His tombstone, wherein he is described as amico optimo ("best of friends"), has been recovered at Rome; this language suggests he died without children.

== Familia and properties ==
Various artifacts have been recovered, which provide rare clues to Livianus' economic status. His two servant boys, Hierus and Asillus, have already been mentioned. Another surviving inscription was created by the overseer of his slaves, one Alcimus. Also mentioned was the opus figlinae; ownership of a brickyard was a sign of great wealth. That Livianus owned property in Praeneste is suggested by sigilla impressa found there.

== See also ==
- List of ancient Romans
