= Lucius Fabius Justus =

Late 1st/early 2nd century Roman senator, consul and governor

Lucius Fabius Justus was a Roman senator (active in the late 1st and early 2nd centuries AD) who occupied a number of offices in the imperial service. He also served as suffect consul in 102, replacing Lucius Licinius Sura as the colleague of the consul who opened the year, Lucius Julius Ursus Servianus; both Justus and Servianus closed their nundinium at the end of April.

Justus is known as a correspondent of Pliny the Younger, and is the addressee of Tacitus' Dialogus de oratoribus. Ronald Syme questioned in a 1957 essay the rationale behind Tacitus addressing his work to Justus instead of, for example, Pliny the Younger. Syme's answer was that Justus at the time of the dedication was a young adult who had become cynical of the craft of rhetoric. Syme further pictures Justus as a viri militares (unlike Pliny), and as "an enlighted and cultivated person [who] had deserted eloquence for the career of provinces and armies" despite the scant evidence for Justus' role in governing provinces or leading armies.

== Origins ==
There is no exact information on the origins of Justus. Syme and Werner Eck believe that he came from a senatorial family of Gallia Narbonensis. However, other authorities cite epigraphic data that Justus was from the Iberian Peninsula, pointing out that there are more inscriptions that mention a person of the gens Fabia in those provinces: whereas there are only 50 such inscriptions in Gallia Narbonensis, in the provinces of Hispania there are over 300 inscriptions.

Historian A. Kaballos notes that a number of senators bearing the gentilicum "Fabius", originated from Spain. As for which province Justus came from, an inscription has been found in Lusitania mentioning a Fabius Justus of the tribe Galeria. According to the researcher Francoise de Bosque-Plateau, our Justus came from the Spanish city of Ulia (Montemayor, Córdoba).

== Life ==
From the correspondence Pliny published, he mentions Justus in one letter and wrote two more to him. In a letter to Voconius Romanus, wherein Pliny gloats over the discomfort the delator or informer Marcus Aquilius Regulus felt following the death of Domitian in the year 96, Pliny mentions that Justus was one of the people Regulus approached to intervene on his behalf with Pliny, hoping to stave off Pliny's prosecution of the former informer. Of the two letters he wrote to Justus, the first was a light-hearted reproach for not writing him, while the second apparently was written after Justus responded to Pliny's first letter, accepting Justus' explanation that during the present summer he was too busy and looking forward to the winter months when Justus would have more time to write, while promising to send some of his own writings which the other had apparently asked for. Syme writes he fails to detect in the two letters addressed to Justus "a common friendship" with him that Pliny had with Tacitus, another of his correspondents: "He stood closer to Tacitus than did the other consular orator. Pliny favoured Tacitus with a long epistle defending long orations (I.20). Fabius has the dedication of the Dialogus which declared that eloquence is not needed any more."

Evidence for his career begins after Justus completed his nundinium as suffect consul. On the eve of Trajan's Dacian War, Justus was appointed governor of Moesia Inferior in 105, replacing Aulus Caecilius Faustinus; he held this post after the conclusion of the war, until 108. Syme would date the two letters Pliny wrote him to his administration of Moesia Inferior, thus explaining why Justus had been too busy to write. Once his term in Moesia Inferior was completed, Justus was assigned that same year to Syria, which he governed for four years, until 112. Syme speculates he may have died in Syria, thus denied a second consulship.

Political offices
| Preceded by Lucius Julius Ursus Servianus II; Lucius Licinius Sura II as ordinarii | Roman consul 102 (suffect) with Lucius Julius Ursus Servianus II | Succeeded by Titus Didius Secundus; Lucius Publilius Celsus as suffecti |
