= Decimus Terentius Scaurianus =

Roman senator, governor and general

Consul of the Roman Republic
- Incumbent
- Assumed office 102 or 104

Personal details
- Roman tribe: Claudia

Military service
- Allegiance: Roman Empire
- Rank: Praetor; Legatus
- Commands: Governor of Dacia
- Battles/wars: Second Dacian War

Decimus Terentius Scaurianus was a Roman senator and general active in the late 1st and early 2nd centuries AD. He was suffect consul in either the year 102 or 104. He worked his way up through increasingly responsible positions. He commanded a legion from 96 to 98 and again during the Second Dacian War. After the war he was military governor of the newly conquered province from 106 to 111. He is known to have been decorated for his military service.

== Life ==
=== Origins ===
Ronald Syme has asserted his origins may lie in Gallia Narbonensis. However, Nicolay Sharankov has pointed out the evidence for this is not decisive. He points out that his son Decimus Terentius Gentianus belonged to the tribe Quirina, and that the nomen Terentius point to an origin in the Iberian provinces. If so, Sharankov suggests that a Hispanic origin would explain the favor both father and son enjoyed from the emperor Trajan.

=== Magistracies ===
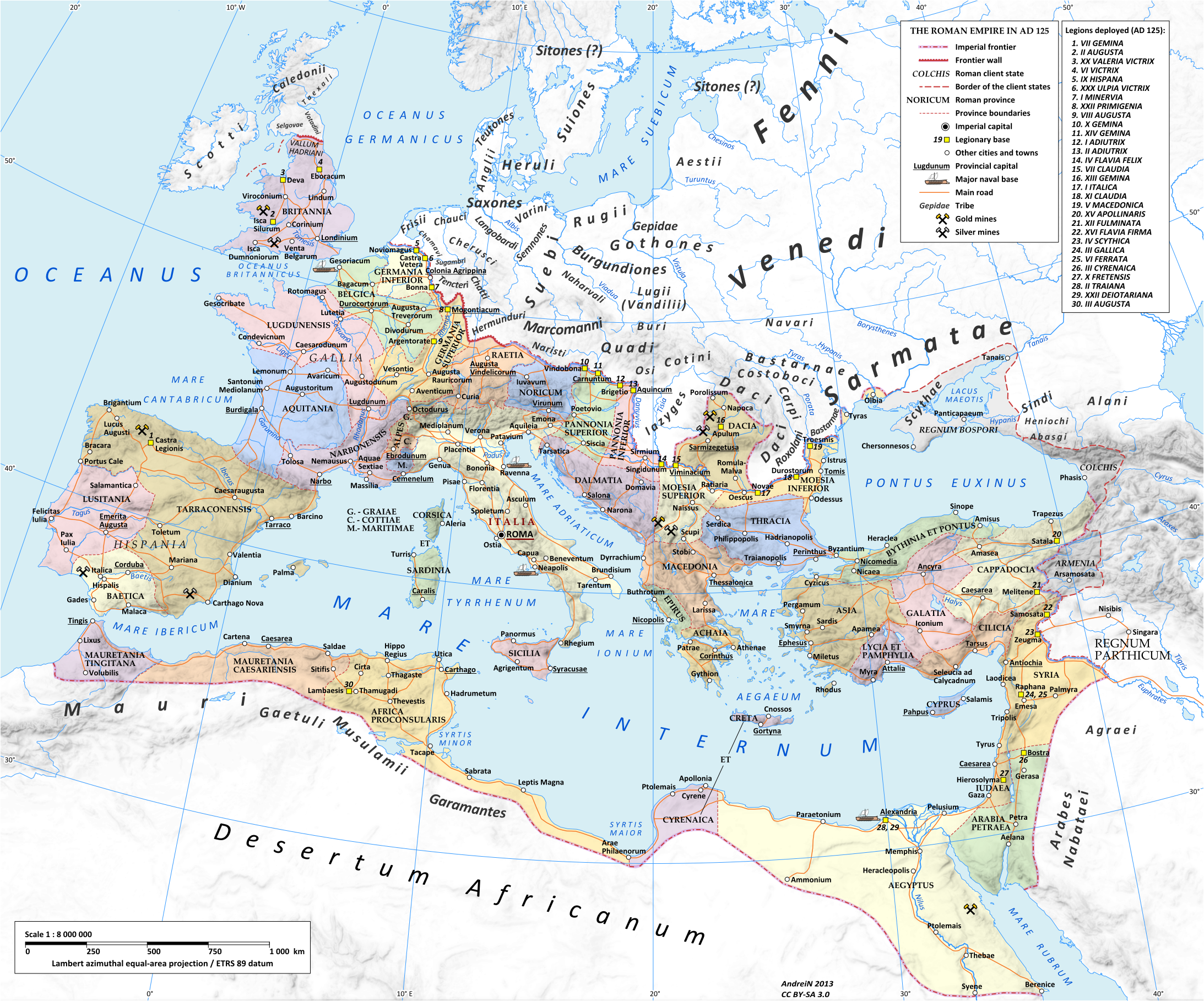
The Roman Empire after the Second Dacian War

Scaurianus was of plebeian origin. His cursus honorum, the sequential mixture of military and political administrative positions held by aspiring politicians in the early Roman Empire, is known in part from a damaged inscription found at Nemausus (modern Nîmes). The inscription also bears the name of Pompeia Marullus, whom historian Ronald Syme identifies as a relative of Scaurianus. His first recorded office is as a member of the quattuorviri viarum curandarum, the board of four magistrates overseeing road maintenance within the city of Rome. It was one of the four boards that formed the vigintiviri, and membership in one of these four boards was a preliminary and required first step towards entry to the Roman Senate. Next Scaurianus was commissioned military tribune, a middle ranking officer, in Legio I Italica, which at the time was stationed at Novae (modern Svishtov) in the imperial province of Moesia. He served as quaestor in the public province of Achaea, responsible for supervising the state treasury and conducting audits. Upon completion of his quaestorship, Scaurianus was enrolled in the Senate. Although the inscription from Nemausus is incomplete, it attests he held the traditional Republican magistracy of plebeian tribune, another prestigious position which had lost its independence and most of its practical functions, and then he was elected praetor.

=== Consul and general ===
Scaurianus was commissioned legatus, or commander, of another legion by Emperor Trajan. The name of the legion is lost; historian Valerie Maxfield dates his tenure as commander of this unknown legion from around 96 to around 98. In either 102 or 104, Scaurianus served at least part of a year as a consul. A consulship was the highest honour of the Roman state and candidates were chosen carefully by the emperor. It is probable that Scaurianus commanded a legion in the Second Dacian War from 105 to 106. According to Italian historian Albino Garzetti he served on Trajan's staff for at least a part of the war. A number of surviving military diplomas attest to his appointment as governor of Dacia. According to Werner Eck his tenure extended from 106 to 111, after the conclusion of the war. He vigorously Romanised the new province, concentrating on road building, especially those to the gold mines in eastern Dacia. He was the patron and first governor of Roman Dacia's new capital, Ulpia Traiana Sarmizegetusa.

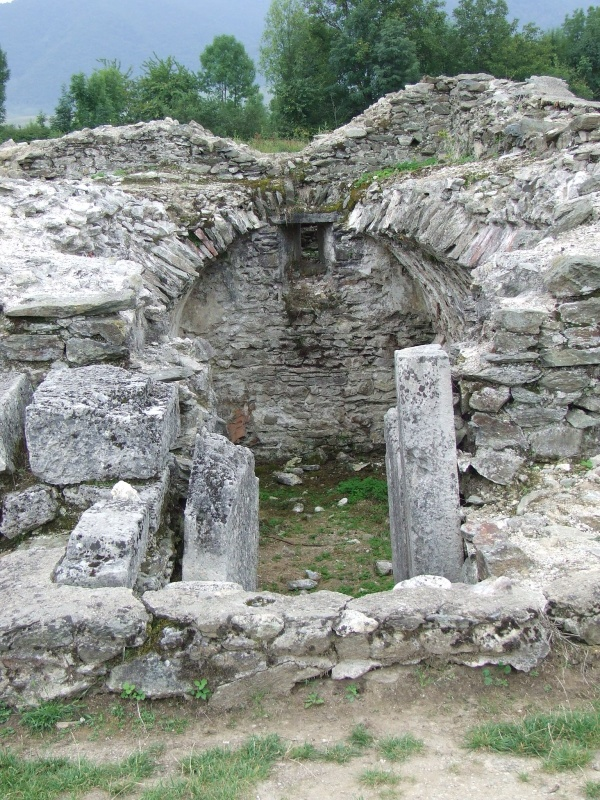
Scarianus was the patron and first governor of the Roman colony of Sarmizegetusa. Shown here are the ruins of the forum.

An inscription from the site reads:

On the command of the emperor Caesar Nerva Traianus Augustus, son of the divine Nerva, was settled the Dacian Colony by Decimus Terentius Scaurianus, its governor.

The inscription from Nemausus records a military decoration or dona militaria which Scaurianus received, an award of four spears. According to Maxfield, this decoration was appropriate to the rank of ex-consul and dates to the Second Dacian War. How he earned these decorations in the war is unknown.
