= Third Battle of Tapae =

Battle between the Roman Empire and the Dacians (101)

- Part of Trajan's Dacian Wars
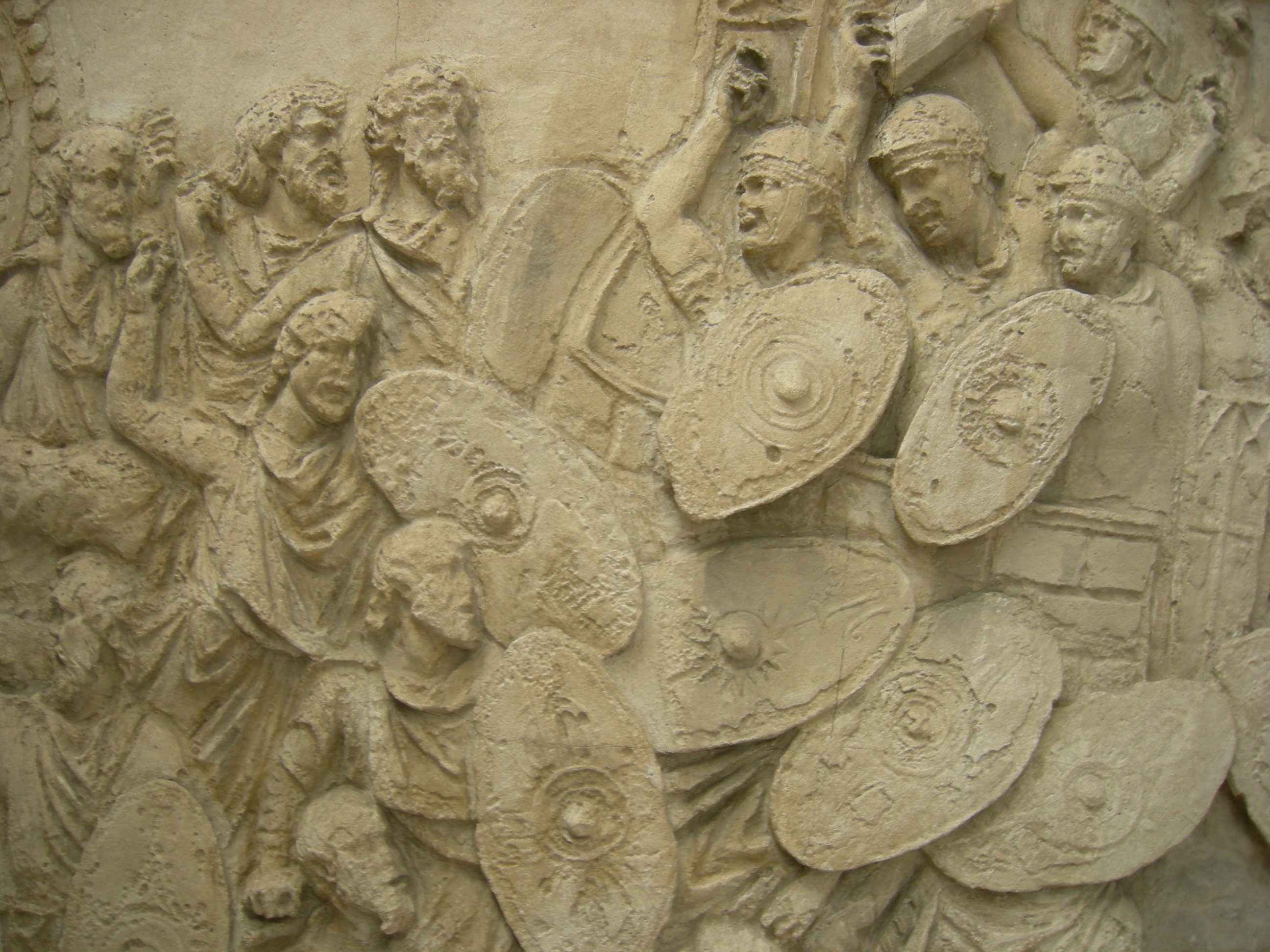
- Battle scene. The Dacians (on the left) are attacking Trajan's men.
Date	September 101
Location	Transylvania, Romania 45°30′20″N 22°43′29″E
Result	Roman victory

Belligerents
Dacia	Roman Empire

Commanders and leaders
Decebalus	Trajan

Strength
Unknown for the battle. (possibly 20,000–30,000)	Total:9–11 legions (70,000–80,000 (including auxiliaries) 7 professional legions, 2–4 mixed legions

Casualties and losses
Unknown	Unknown
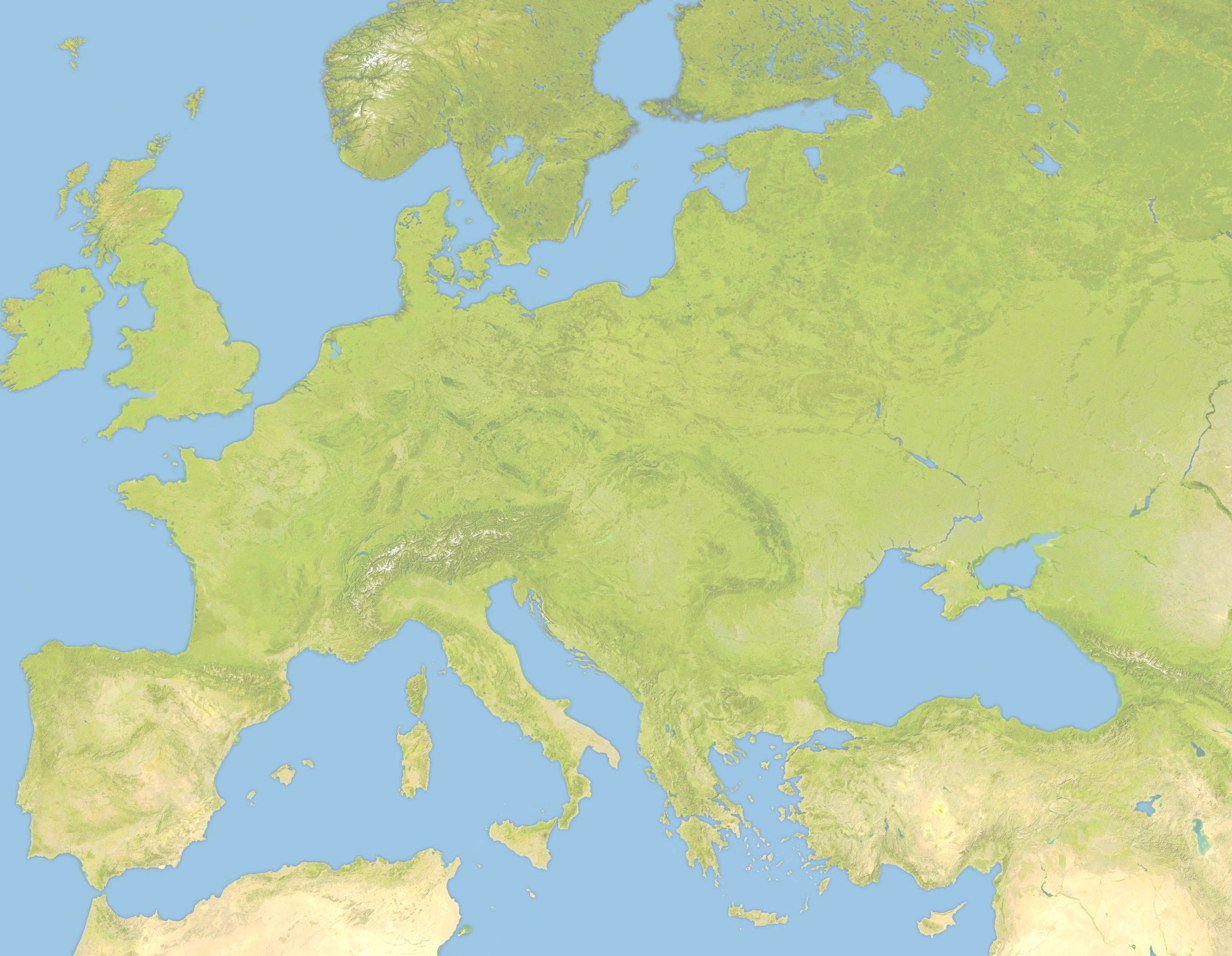
- Location within Romania Third Battle of Tapae (Europe without the extreme north)

The Third Battle of Tapae (101) was the decisive battle of the first of Trajan's Dacian Wars, in which the Roman Emperor defeated the Dacian King Decebalus's army. Other setbacks in the campaign delayed its completion until 102. The battle is most likely the battle-scene depicted on Plate 22 of Trajan's column.

It followed the earlier battles at the same place during Domitian's Dacian War.

== Background ==
As soon as Trajan became Roman emperor, he planned a campaign against Dacia. This campaign resulted in the first Dacian war fought between 101 and 102.

The reason used for this campaign was Decebalus' lack of respect for the Romans, and the fact that he failed to respect the agreements of the peace reached following the Domitian's Wars from 87/88.

Beside the nine Roman legions that were already stationed on the Danube frontier, Trajan brought two more, Legio X Gemina and Legio XI Claudia, and created two new legions, Legio II Traiana Fortis and Legio XXX Ulpia Victrix.

== The battle ==
The Roman army had crossed the Danube at Viminacium, slowly making its way into Dacia. Just like in 87/88, the battle took place at Tapae where Trajan engaged in a fierce battle with the bulk of his army. The clash, as illustrated on Trajan's Column, was favourable to the Romans but at the cost of great bloodshed. A storm broke out and the Dacians believing it a sign from the gods, decided to withdraw. It was not decisive since Decebalus was able to establish himself within his forts in the area of Orăștie, ready to block access to the capital Sarmizegetusa Regia.

== Aftermath ==
Because the winter was near, Trajan decided to wait until spring to continue his offensive on Sarmizegetusa. Decebalus took advantage of the new situation, and in the winter of 101 to 102, he attacked the Roman province of Moesia, a major clash taking place at the Battle of Adamclisi.

== See also ==
- List of Roman battles
- Trajan's Dacian Wars
- Dacian warfare
