= Fețele Albe castra =

Feţele Albe
- Location within Romania
- 45.64°N 23.24°E
- Location: Hunedoara, Romania

Site notes
- Archaeologists: Alexandru Vulpe; Ioan Glodariu; Ioan Piso; Hadrian Daicoviciu; A. Rusu; Eugen Iaroslavschi; M. Bărbulescu; T. Soroceanu

Feţele Albe was a fort in the Roman province of Dacia.

== See also ==
- List of castra
