= Adamclisi =

- Commune
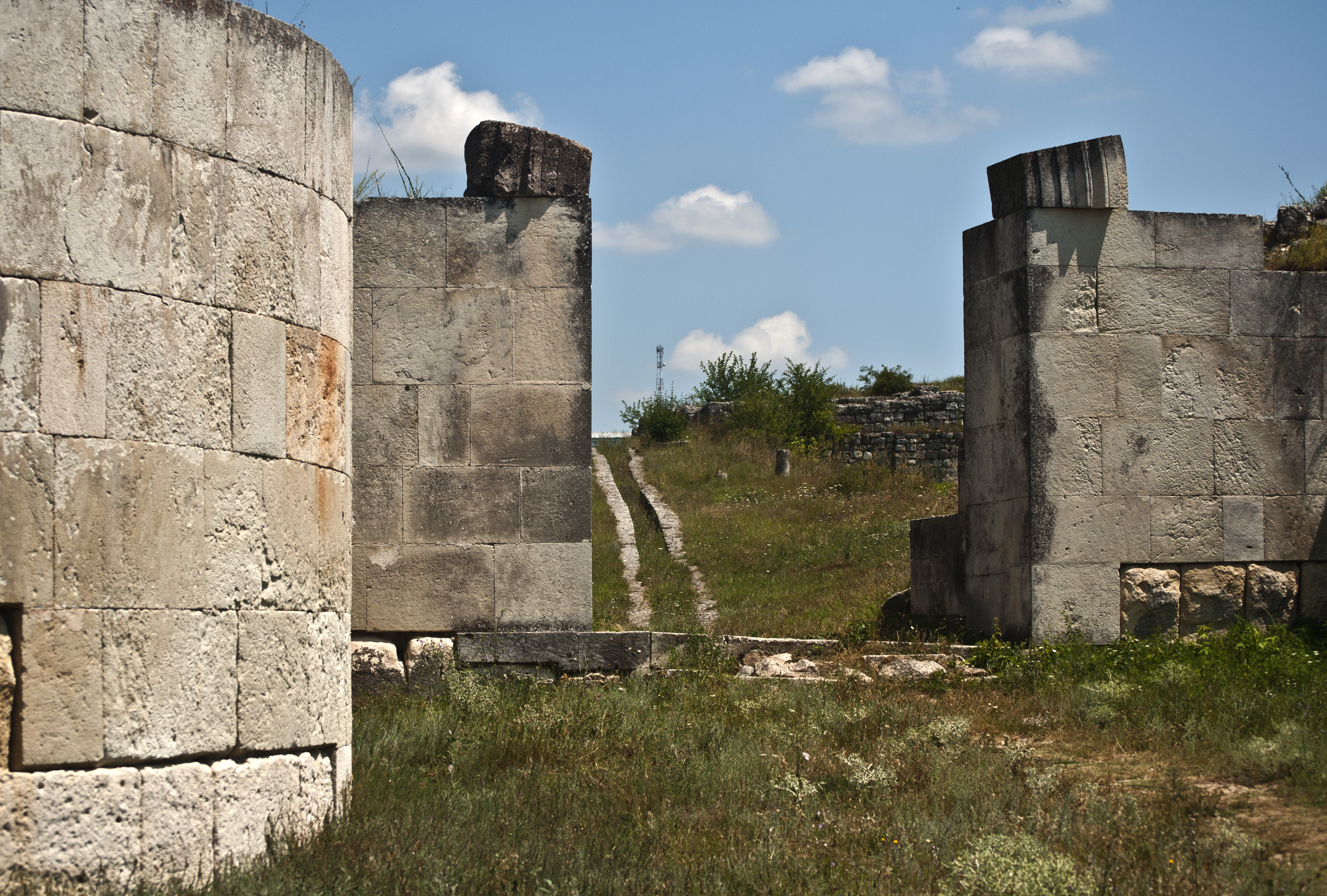
- Civitas Tropaensium Roman castra

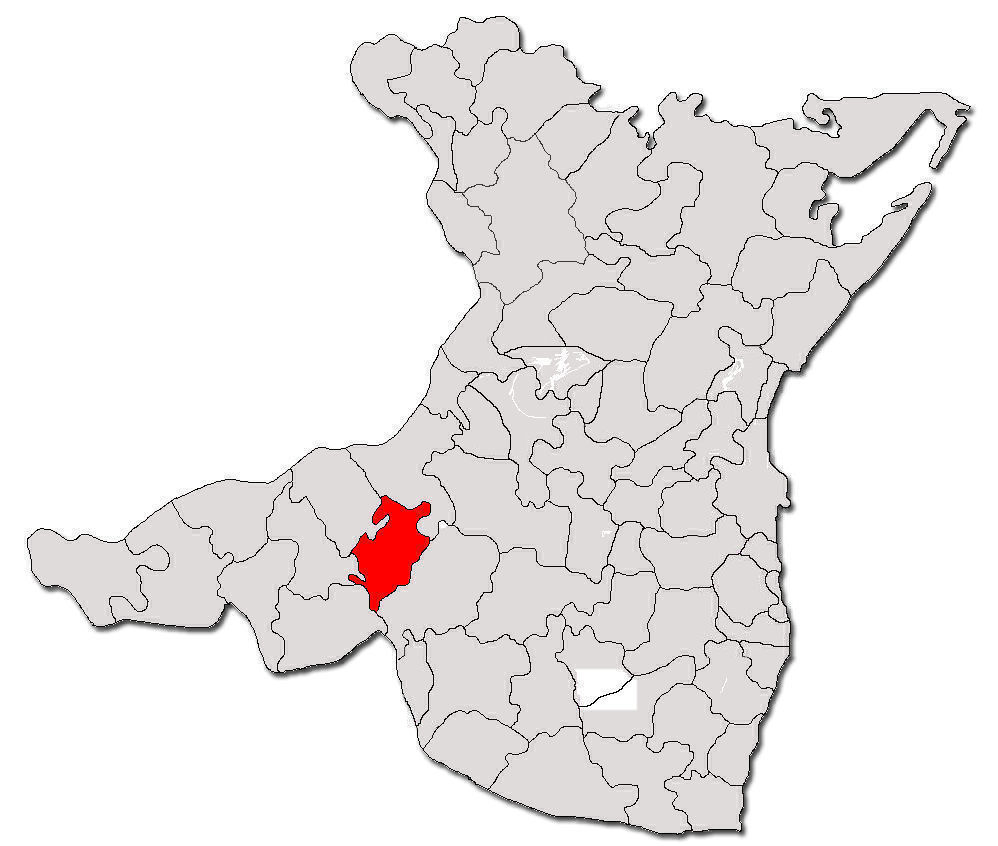
- Location in Constanța County

- Location in Romania
- Coordinates: 44°4′45″N 27°57′15″E
- Country: Romania
- County: Constanța
- Subdivisions: Adamclisi, Abrud, Hațeg, Urluia, Zorile

Government
  - Mayor (2020–2024): Dorina Cicilia Șerbănescu (PNL)
- Area: 135.73 km^{2} (52.41 sq mi)
- Elevation: 118 m (387 ft)
- Population (2021-12-01): 2,044
  - Density: 15.06/km^{2} (39.00/sq mi)
- Time zone: UTC+02:00 (EET)
  - Summer (DST): UTC+03:00 (EEST)
- Postal code: 907010
- Area code: (+40) 02 41
- Vehicle reg.: CT
- Website: www.primaria-adamclisi.ro

Adamclisi (Romanian pronunciation: [adamkliˈsi]) is a commune in Constanța County, in the Dobrogea region of Romania.

== History ==
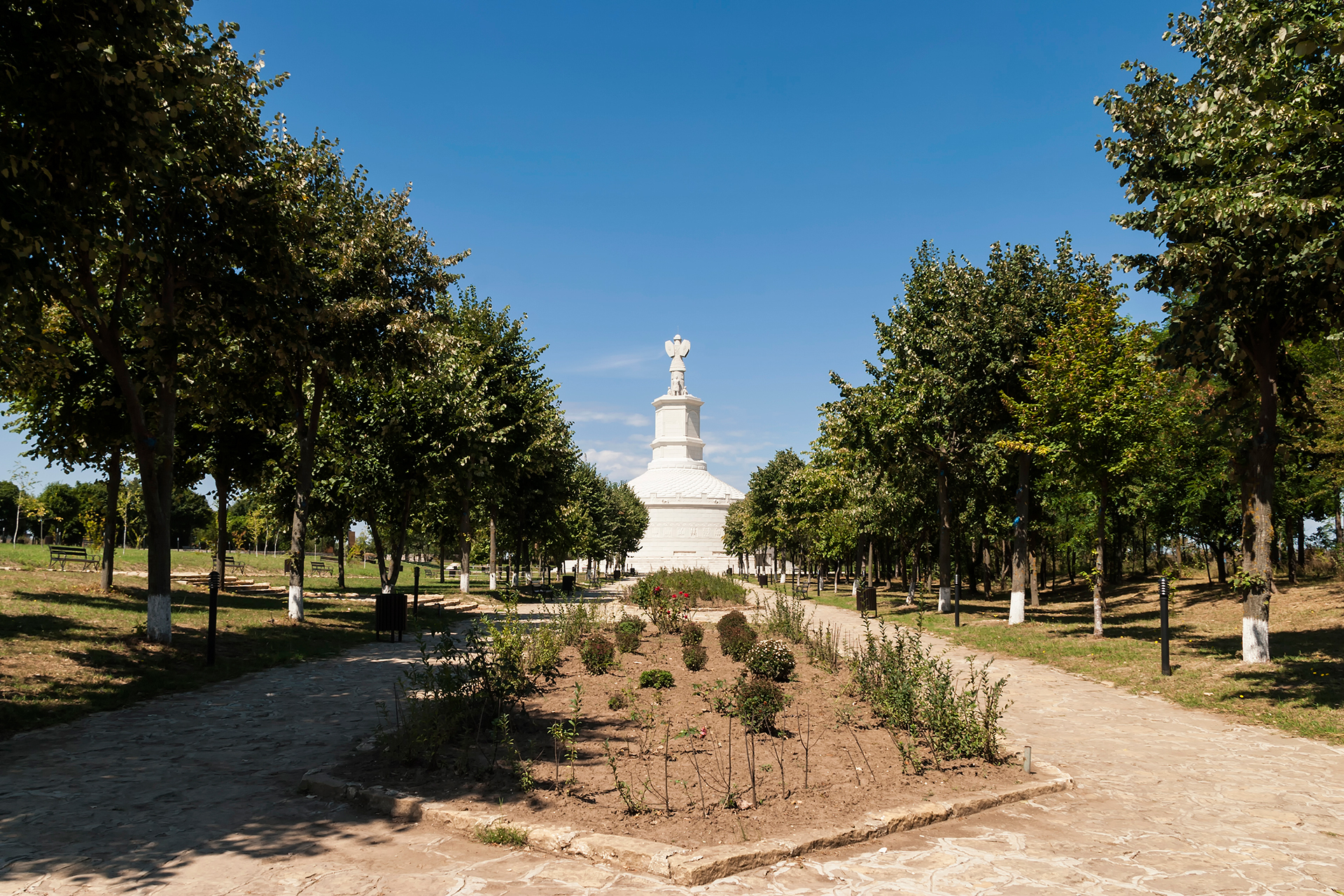
Reconstruction of the Tropaeum Traiani

The Battle of Adamclisi was a major clash fought nearby during Trajan's Dacian Wars in the winter of 101/102 between the Roman Empire and the Dacians resulting in a decisive Roman victory, though both sides suffered very heavy casualties.

A Roman fort named Civitas Tropaensium was built here and in 109 AD Trajan's Trophy (Tropaeum Traiani) was built to commemorate his victories over the Dacians.

Colonized with Roman veterans of the Dacian Wars, the city was the largest Roman city of Scythia Minor and became a municipium in the year 170. Destroyed by the Goths, it was rebuilt during the rule of Constantine the Great with better defensive walls, which defended the city successfully until the Avars sacked it in 587. After that moment, it ceased to be among the important cities of Dobrogea and was no longer mentioned for seven hundred years.

During the Ottoman rule, the village was re-founded by Turkish settlers. After Dobruja was awarded to Romania, in 1878, the Muslim population left for Turkey, leaving the village deserted. However, in 1880 – 1881, the village was re-settled with Romanians from Transylvania and Teleorman.

== Etymology ==
The current name has a Turkish origin and it is an adaptation in Romanian of "Adam Kilisse" which means "the Church of Adam" (when the Turkish people settled in this area, they thought the Ancient Roman monument was a church).

== Villages ==
Villages in the Adamclisi commune:

- Adamclisi (historical name: Turkish: Adam Kilisesi)
- Abrud (historical name: Mulciova) – named after Abrud, Alba County
- Hațeg (historical name: Arabagi, Turkish: Arabacı) – named after Hațeg, Hunedoara County
- Urluia (historical name: Urluchioi, Turkish: Uğurluköy)
- Zorile (historical name: Cherimcuius, Turkish: Kerimkuyusu)

The territory of the commune also includes the former village of Cucuruz (historical name: Iusuf Punar), located at 44°7′28″N 27°55′51″E, nominally merged with Urluia by the 1968 administrative reform.

== Demographics ==
Historical population
Year	Pop.	±%
2002	2,320	—
2011	2,250	−3.0%
2021	2,044	−9.2%
Source: Census data

At the 2021 census, Adamclisi had a population of 2,044; of those, 89.97% were Romanians and 3.25% Turks. At the 2011 census, the population of the commune was 2,250, and that included 90.98% Romanians and 2.09% Turks.

== Natives ==
- Marian Dinu (born 1965), football coach and former player
- Aurel Rădulescu (1953–1979), footballer
