= Trajan's Second Dacian War =

Conflict between the Romans and the Dacians (105-106)

Second Dacian War
- Part of the Dacian Wars
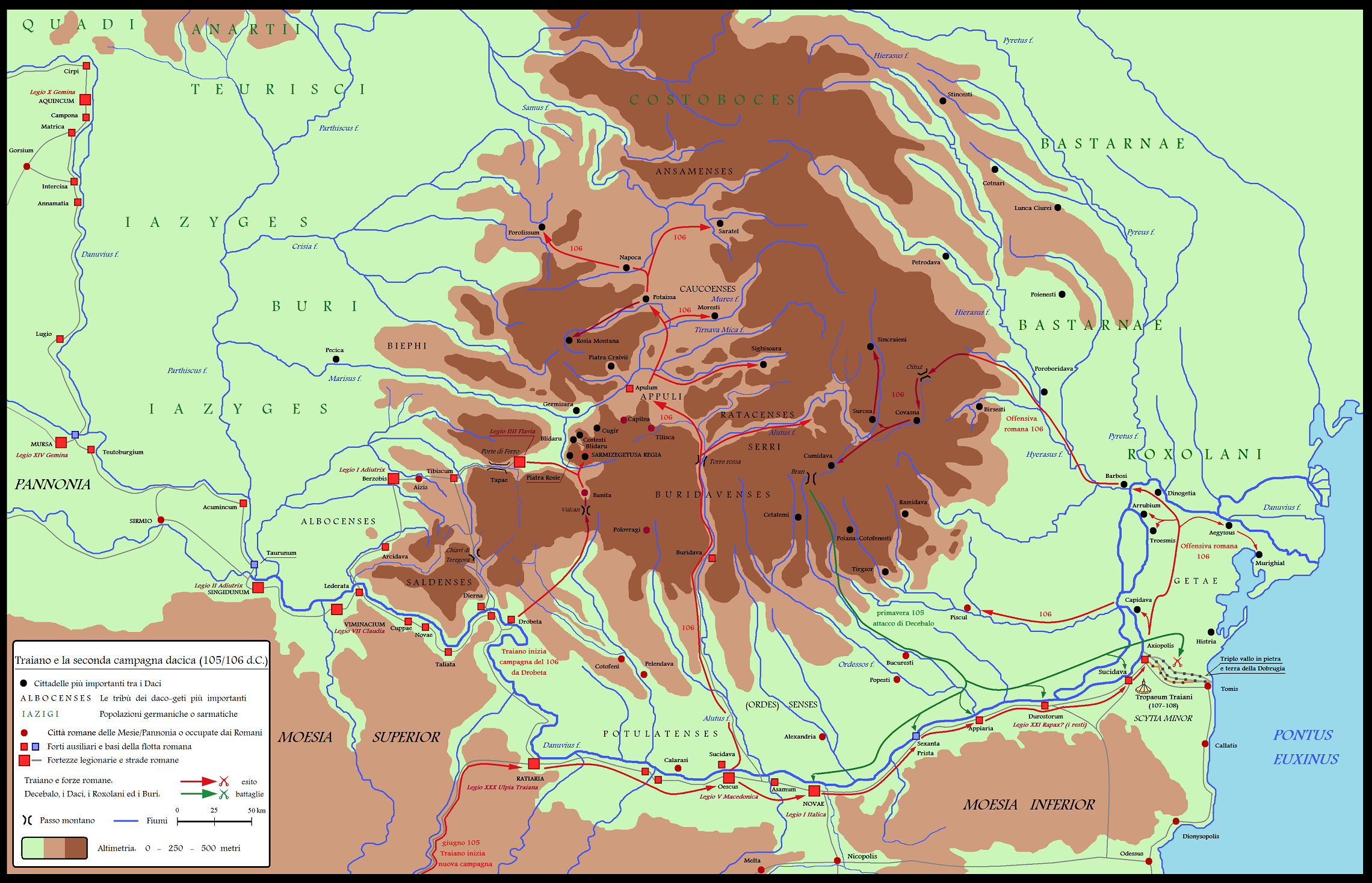
- After the war, the core Dacian territory immediately became the imperial province of Dacia, while the more eastern and western territories were annexed to the provinces of Upper and Lower Moesia.
Date	105–106
Location	Dacia
Result	Roman victory
Territorial changes	Roman Empire annexes Dacia west of Siret river Iazyge client kingdom set up in Banat and Oltenia

Belligerents
Roman Empire; Iazyges	Dacia; Roxolani

Commanders and leaders
Trajan	Decebalus

Strength
150,000–175,000	200,000

Casualties and losses
Unknown	Heavy, 500,000 prisoners

Trajan's Second Dacian War was fought between 105 and 106 because the Dacian king, Decebalus, had broken his peace terms with the Roman Emperor Trajan from the Trajan's First Dacian War.

== Before the War ==
Following his subjugation, Decebalus complied with Rome for a time, but was soon inciting revolt among tribes against them.

Before the start of the 2nd war, Trajan had built his great bridge over the Danube to move his legions faster into Dacia.

== War ==
Roman plans for the war led to a well-planned counter-attack led by Decebalus and numerous Roman fortified positions in Wallachia were occupied or besieged by the Dacians, as were those along the Danube. After several failed attempts, Decebalus managed to get the governor of the newly occupied territories (Gnaeus Pompeius Longinus, one of the top Roman commanders in 104) to meet him, promising that he would do whatever demanded. However, when Longinus arrived the Dacian king had him arrested and interrogated about Trajan's plans; when Longinus refused to answer, Decebalus had him imprisoned. The king then offered Trajan to trade Longinus for the territory Trajan had conquered and the money Decebalus had spent on the war. An ambiguous answer was returned, so as not to cause Decebalus to believe that Trajan regarded Longinus as either of great importance or of slight importance so as to prevent his being killed or being returned on excessive terms. Meanwhile Longinus committed suicide to deny any advantage to the Dacian king.

The work of reconquest led Trajan to spend the entire summer of 105 there and prevented him from starting a new invasion campaign in Dacian territory before the following year. The events in this period are shown on Trajan's Column:

- the emperor having arrived after a long journey from Rome at the head of his praetorians, reaches the front in a territory that seems to belong to Dacian peoples and is acclaimed by them
- in a city of the same region, Trajan offers a propitiatory sacrifice in view of the new campaign to be carried out, in front of a mixed crowd of Romans and Dacians or Getae
- A group of soldiers, having laid down their weapons, begin to cut down trees and build a road towards a fortified city inside the forest, perhaps in Oltenia
- Decebalus takes part in a war council with some Dacian nobles inside a fort, while other dignitaries gather from various parts, as the plain and mountains depicted in the background suggest
- Some Roman positions are attacked, but they seem to resist the impetus of the Dacians, who subsequently also attack a triple line of defense which could be identified with the limes of Dobrudja, built by Domitian during his first Dacian campaign (between 85 and 89 and strengthened by Trajan perhaps in the period 103-104
- Trajan himself, having reached the front of the battle (probably in Dobrudja), aided the governor of Lower Moesia, Lucius Fabius Justus and pushed the Dacians back. This would evidently be the last scene of the campaign of 105.

== 106 ==
Trajan summoned leaders of the "friends and allies of the Roman people" (the Quadi, Marcomanni, some tribes of the Daco-Getae and perhaps the Iazyges themselves) to his headquarters on the Danube (probably in Drobeta) in order to obtain military aid and strategic support before starting the last campaign, thus making sure of their loyalty). Several Roman legions crossed Trajan's Bridge into Dacia and gradually Trajan's army began to push northward.

At the beginning of the summer of 106 Trajan attacked the Dacian capital on two fronts with the participation of the legions II Adiutrix and IV Flavia Felix and a detachment (vexillatio) from Legio VI Ferrata (perhaps from the " Iron Gates" pass and from the Red Tower pass) but the Dacians repelled the first attack that left the Romans with numerous dead and wounded. The major siege at the Battle of Sarmisegetusa must have been long and fraught with many setbacks and delays, involving skirmishes in rocky terrain after the Dacians made sallies from their walls, and using siege machines and offensive siegeworks. The Romans destroyed the water pipes to the Dacian capital.

In the end Sarmisegetusa Regia capitulated towards the end of the summer of that year and the Dacians set fire to their own buildings and Dacian leaders committed suicide to avoid being taken prisoner. Finally, one after the other, all the fortified fortresses in the Orăștie area fell: from Popești to Cetățeni, Piatra Neamț, Pecica, Piatra Craivii, Căpâlna, Costești, Bănița, Bălănești up to Tilișca.

Nevertheless, the war went on with more sieges of Dacian forts and Dacian attacks on Roman camps until the last battle with Dacians took place at Porolissum.

Decebalus sought refuge in the north, in the Carpathian mountains an almost inaccessible region, but a Roman column pursued him along the valley of the Marisus river. The Dacian leaders of the north, although aware of their imminent end, joined the king in a desperate attempt to reverse the fortunes of the war, even achieving some success. Decebalus was reached by an auxiliary unit of the Roman army in Ranistrorum (today's Piatra Craivii, north of the later veteran colony of Apulum (castra)) and before being captured by Tiberius Claudius Maximus, committed suicide with many of the leaders of his retinue. The head of the Dacian king was brought to Trajan For a few months the Roman army was still engaged in repressive actions but it was a matter of quelling small local riots. The coinage of that year celebrated Dacia capta (occupied).

Due to the treason of a confidant (Bicilis) of the Dacian King, the Romans found Decebalus's treasure in the River Sargesia, a fortune estimated at 165,500 kg of gold and 331,000 kg of silver.

== Aftermath ==
Dacian territories annexed to the Roman Empire (marked in violet)

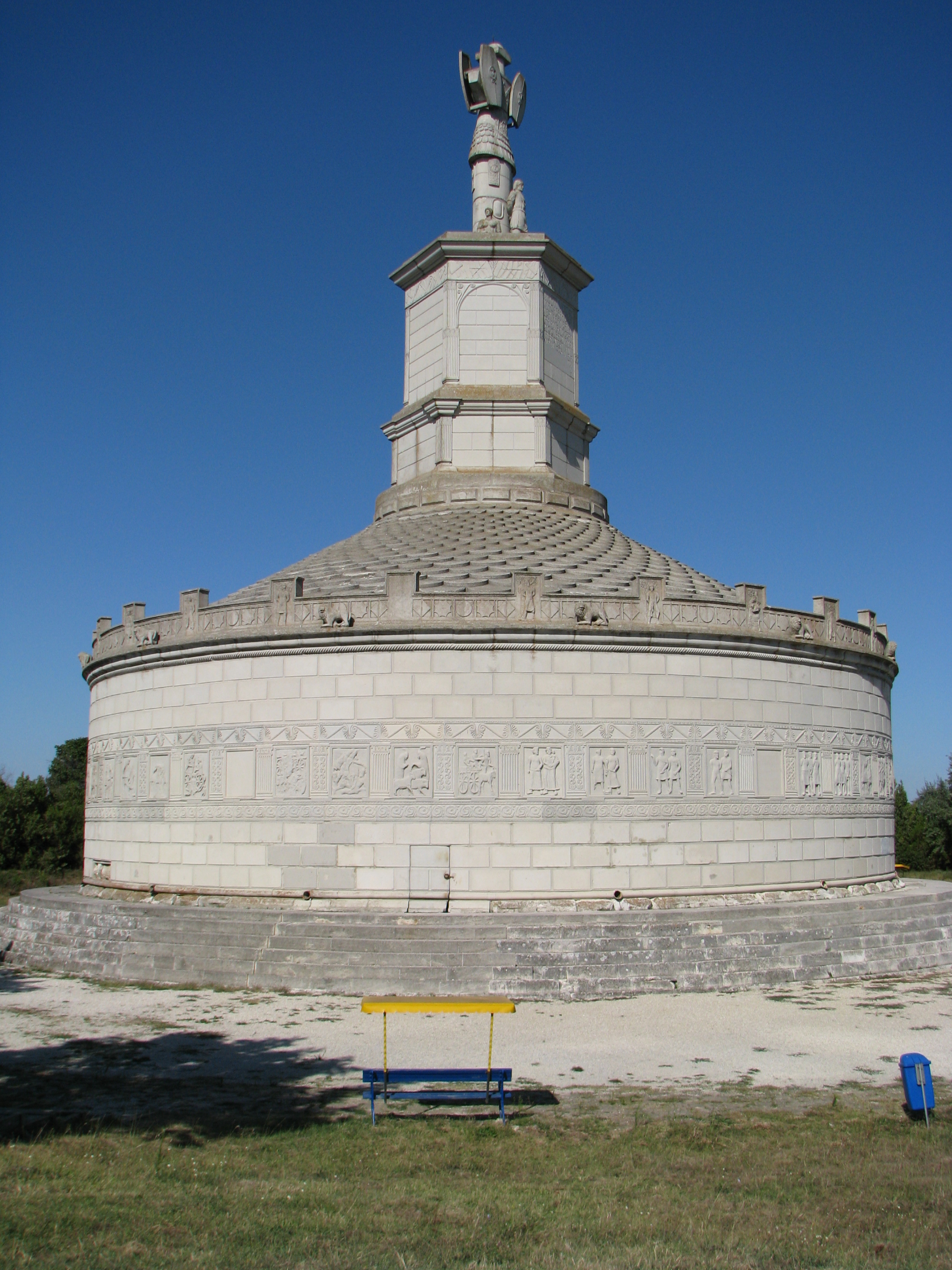
Tropaeum Traiani

The Tropaeum Traiani (Trajan's Trophy) was built in 109 AD near the modern Adamclisi, Romania to commemorate Trajan's victory in 106, including the victory at the Battle of Adamclisi nearby in 102. It was part of a monumental complex comprising the trophy monument, the tumulus grave behind it and the commemorative altar, raised in 102 AD for soldiers fallen in the battles of this region.

In 113, Trajan built Trajan's Column near the Colosseum in Rome to commemorate his victory.

The Dacian kingdom ceased to exist, but a large part remained outside of Roman Imperial authority along the plain of Tisza, lower Marisus and Crisul. The heart of the old kingdom was transformed into the new Roman province of Dacia with its capital in the newly founded city of Ulpia Traiana Sarmizegetusa. Much of the Wallachian plain in Muntenia and Moldavia with the new forts for auxiliary units such as at Piroboridava were attributed to the province of Moesia Inferior.

Additionally, the conquest changed the balance of power in the region and was the catalyst for a renewed alliance of Germanic and Celtic tribes and kingdoms against the Roman Empire. However, within the annexed territory and surrounds, the material advantages of being part of the Roman Imperial system wasn't lost on the majority of the surviving Dacian aristocracy. Thus began the process by which most modern Romanian historians and linguists believe that many of the Dacians subsequently became romanized (see also Origin of Romanians).

== See also ==
- Trajan's Dacian Wars
- Roman Dacia
