= Trajan's Dacian Wars =

101–106 AD pair of Roman wars against Dacia

- Part of the Dacian Wars
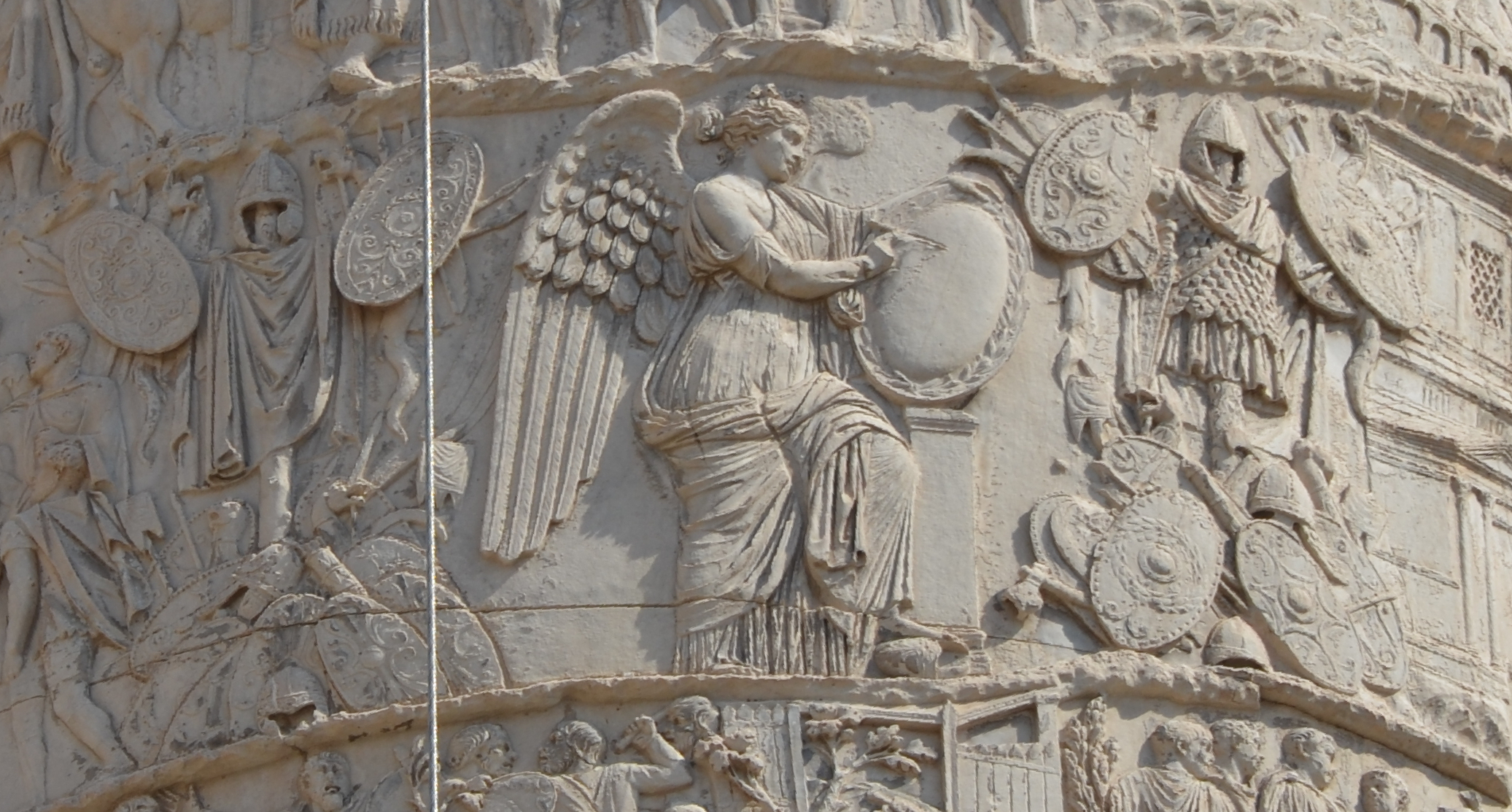
- Image of Victoria used to separate the two wars on Trajan's Column
Date	101–102 and 105–106
Location	Ancient Dacia
Result	Roman victory
Territorial changes	Roman Empire annexes Dacia west of Siret river Iazyge client kingdom set up in Banat and Oltenia

Belligerents
Dacia; Roxolani; Buri; Bastarnae	Roman Empire; Iazyges; Marcomanni; Quadi; Getae

Commanders and leaders
Decebalus (surrendered)	Trajan

Units involved
Dacian army	Legio I Adiutrix; Legio I Italica; Legio I Minervia; Legio II Adiutrix; Legio IV Flavia Felix; Legio IV Macedonica; Legio IV Scythica; Legio V Macedonica; Legio VI Ferrata; Legio VII Claudia; Legio X Fretensis; Legio X Gemina; Legio XI Claudia; Legio XII Fulminata; Legio XIII Gemina; Legio XIV Gemina

Strength
200,000 Dacians; Germanic and Sarmatian allies	16 legions (between 150,000 and 175,000 infantry + auxiliary)

Casualties and losses
Heavy; 500,000 prisoners	Unknown

Trajan's Dacian Wars (101–102, 105–106) were two military campaigns fought between the Roman Empire and the Dacians under King Decebalus during the reign of Emperor Trajan. The conflicts stemmed from repeated Dacian incursions into the province of Moesia and from Rome's growing need for resources. Discontent with the treaty Domitian had concluded with Decebalus in 89 AD persisted, and Trajan, keen to assert himself as a soldier-emperor, took the opportunity to reassert Roman authority.

Trajan's First Dacian War began in 101 AD, when the emperor led a major offensive across the Danube using a pontoon bridge constructed by his engineer Apollodorus of Damascus, who also cut a road through the river cliffs. The Romans won a series of victories, including at Tapae and Adamclisi. Before Trajan could capture the Dacian capital, Sarmizegetusa, Decebalus sought peace. The treaty forced him to surrender territory and engineers provided by Domitian, return equipment, accept Roman garrisons, and refrain from crossing the Danube.

Within a few years Decebalus broke the agreement, rebuilding his forces, stirring neighboring tribes, and raiding Roman territory. In 105, Trajan launched the Second Dacian War, this time crossing on the great stone bridge at Drobeta, also designed by Apollodorus. Roman legions advanced north and destroyed Dacian fortresses, eventually besieging Sarmizegetusa. The Romans cut its water supply, and the city fell in 106. Decebalus fled but committed suicide to avoid capture, and his treasure was seized by Roman forces.

Rome annexed part of Dacia as a new province, settled with colonists from across the empire and secured with permanent garrisons. The conquest brought control of rich gold and silver mines, which strengthened the imperial treasury. Trajan celebrated with a triumph in Rome, accompanied by public feasts and games that lasted more than four months. The victory was commemorated by Trajan's Column, which depicts the wars in detail, and the influx of resources helped finance Trajan's extensive building projects in Rome.

== Background ==
Throughout the 1st century, Roman policy dictated that threats from neighbouring nations and provinces were to be contained promptly. Dacia had been on the Roman agenda since before the days of Julius Caesar when the Dacians defeated a Roman army at the Battle of Histria.

Domitian's Dacian War had re-established peace with Dacia in 89 AD. However, the Dacian king Decebalus used the Roman annual subsidy of 8 million sesterces and craftsmen in trades devoted to both peace and war, and war machines intended to defend the empire's borders to fortify his own defences instead. Despite some co-operation on the diplomatic front with Domitian, Decebalus continued to oppose Rome.

At the time, Rome was suffering from economic difficulties largely brought on by military invasions throughout Europe and in part due to a low gold content in Roman money as directed by Emperor Nero. Confirmed rumors of Dacian gold and other valuable trade resources inflamed the conflict, as did the Dacians' defiant behaviour, as they were "unbowed and unbroken".

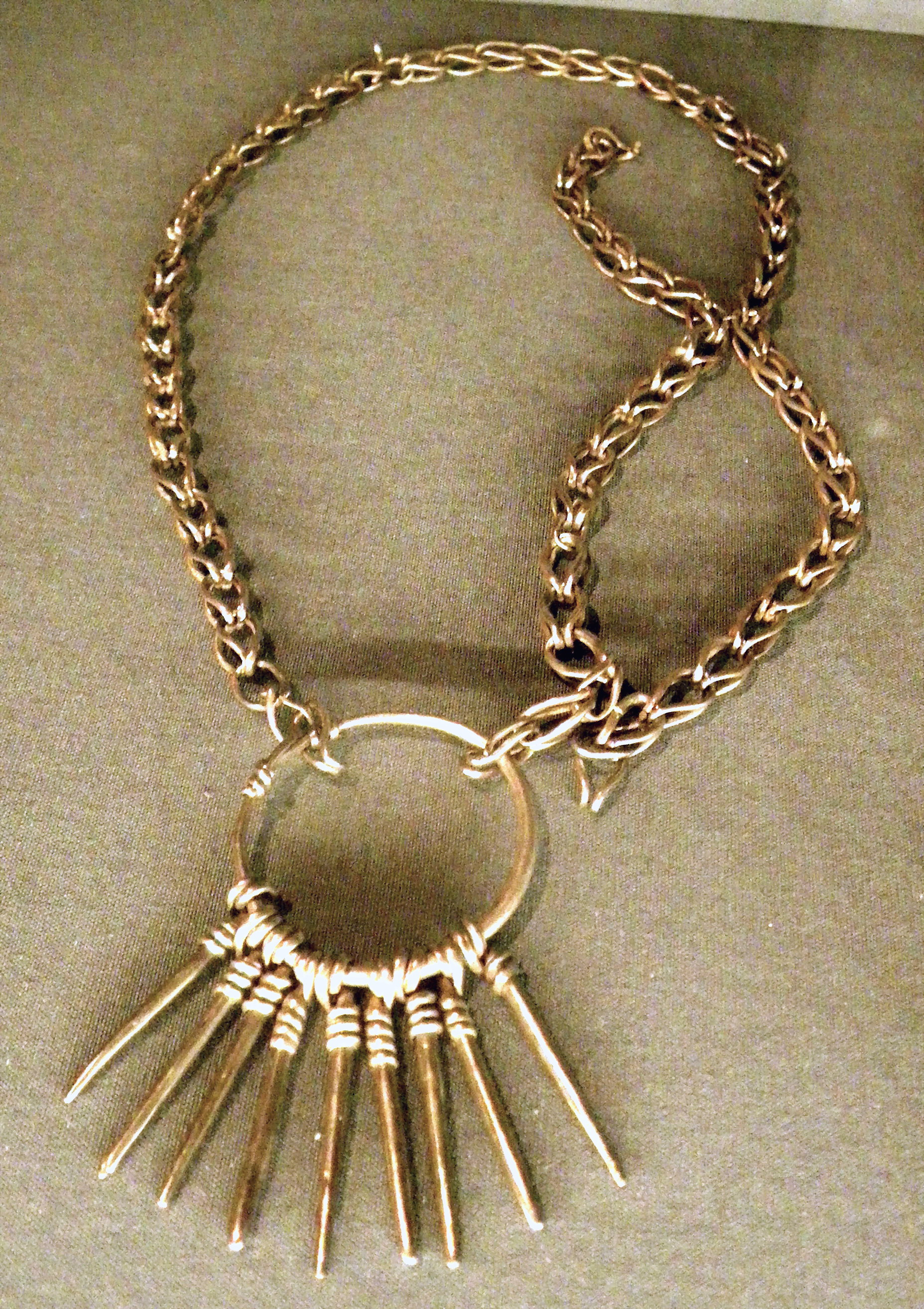
Dacian Gold

However, other pressing reasons motivated them to action. Researchers estimate that only ten percent of barbarians such as Spanish and Gallic warriors had access to swords, usually the nobility. By contrast Dacia had rich resources of iron and copper and were prolific metal workers. A large percentage of Dacians owned swords, greatly reducing Rome's military advantage. Dacia sported 250,000 potential combatants, enough to enable an invasion. It was allied to several of its neighbours and on friendly terms with others that Rome considered enemies. Rome had no concrete defense policy and would not have been able to sustain a war of defense. As such, the new Emperor Trajan, himself an experienced soldier and tactician, began preparing for war. That Dacia was considered a substantial threat can be seen by the fact that Trajan withdrew troops from other borders leaving them dangerously undermanned.

== Trajan's First War ==
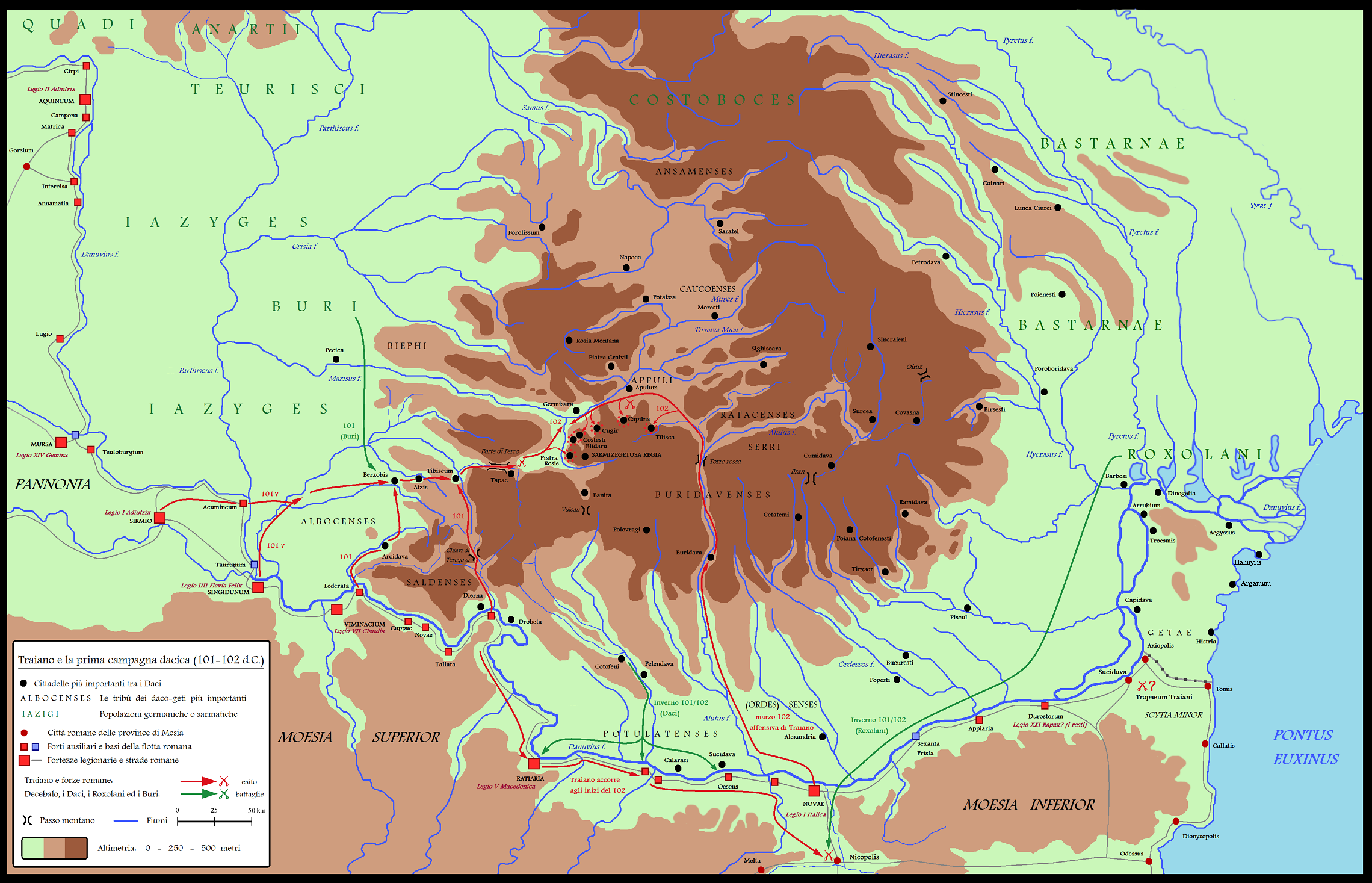
Invasion routes of Trajan 101-102

After gaining the Senate's blessing for war, by 101 Trajan was ready to advance on Dacia. This was a war in which the Roman military's ingenuity and engineering were well demonstrated. The Roman offensive was spearheaded by two legionary columns, marching straight to the heart of Dacia, burning towns and villages en route. Trajan defeated a Dacian army at the Third Battle of Tapae.

In the winter of 101–02, the Roman army under Trajan had been amassed near the later city of Nicopolis ad Istrum at the junction of the Iatrus (Yantra) and the Rositsa rivers in readiness for the attack by the Sarmatian Roxolani tribe from north of the Danube (who were allied to the Dacians), and resulted in a Roman victory for which the city was named.

In 102 Decebalus chose to make peace once it became clear that the Roman advance towards Sarmizegetusa was unstoppable. The war had concluded with an important Roman victory and with the establishment of a garrison and an acting governor at Sarmizegetusa. A bridge later known as Trajan's Bridge was constructed across the Danube at Drobeta to assist with the legionaries' advance. This bridge, probably the biggest at that time and for centuries to come, was designed by Apollodorus of Damascus and was meant to help the Roman army advance faster in Dacia in case of a future war. According to the peace terms, Decebalus got technical and military reinforcement from the Romans in order to create a powerful allied zone against the dangerous possible expeditions from the northern and eastern territories by hostile migrating peoples. The resources were instead used to rebuild Dacian fortresses and strengthen the army. Soon thereafter Decebalus turned against the Romans once again.

== Trajan's Second War ==
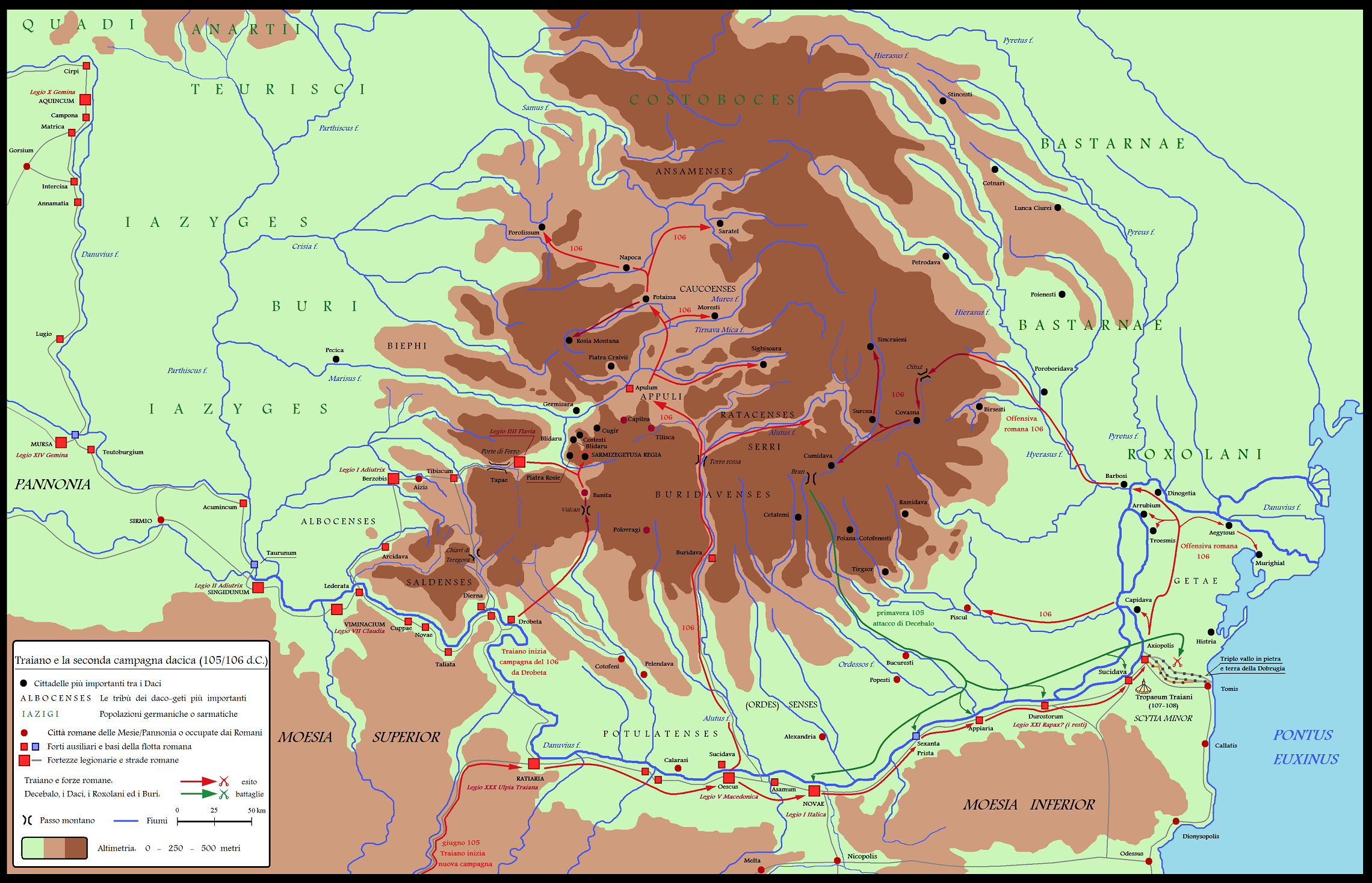
Trajan's movements 105-106

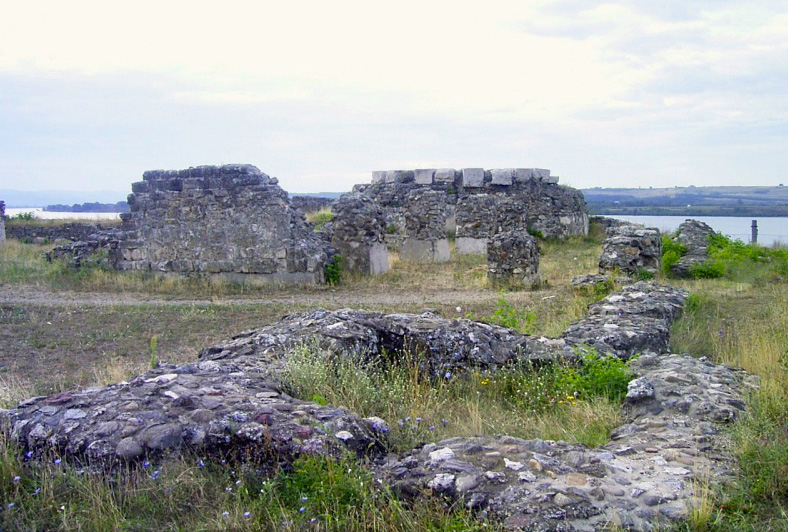
Ruins of Trajan's Bridge

Following the first war, Decebalus complied with Rome for a time, but was soon inciting revolt among tribes against them and pillaging Roman colonies across the Danube. True to his intrepid and optimistic nature, Trajan rallied his forces in AD 105 (including contingents of Quadi, Marcomanni, Getae and Iazyges) to his headquarters on the Danube (probably in Drobeta) for a second war.

Like the first conflict, the second war involved several skirmishes that proved costly to the Roman military. Faced with large numbers of allied tribes, the legions struggled to attain a decisive victory, resulting in a second temporary peace. Eventually, goaded by the behaviour of Decebalus and his repeated violations of the treaty, Rome again brought in reinforcements, took the offensive and prevailed in 105. The next year they gradually conquered the mountain fortress system that surrounded the Dacian capital, Sarmizegetusa. The final decisive battle took place near the walls of Sarmizegetusa, presumably during the summer of 106, with the participation of the legions II Adiutrix and IV Flavia Felix and a detachment (vexillatio) from VI Ferrata.

The Dacians repelled the first attack, but the Romans, helped by a treacherous local nobleman, found and destroyed the water pipes of the Dacian capital. Running out of water and food the city fell and was razed. Decebalus fled, but was followed by the Roman cavalry and committed suicide rather than submit. Nevertheless, the war went on. Thanks to the treason of a confidant of the Dacian king, Bicilis, the Romans found Decebalus's treasure in the river of Sargesia/Sargetia - a fortune estimated by Carcopino at 165,500 kg of gold and 330,000 kg of silver. The last battle took place at Porolissum (Moigrad).

== Conclusion and aftermath ==
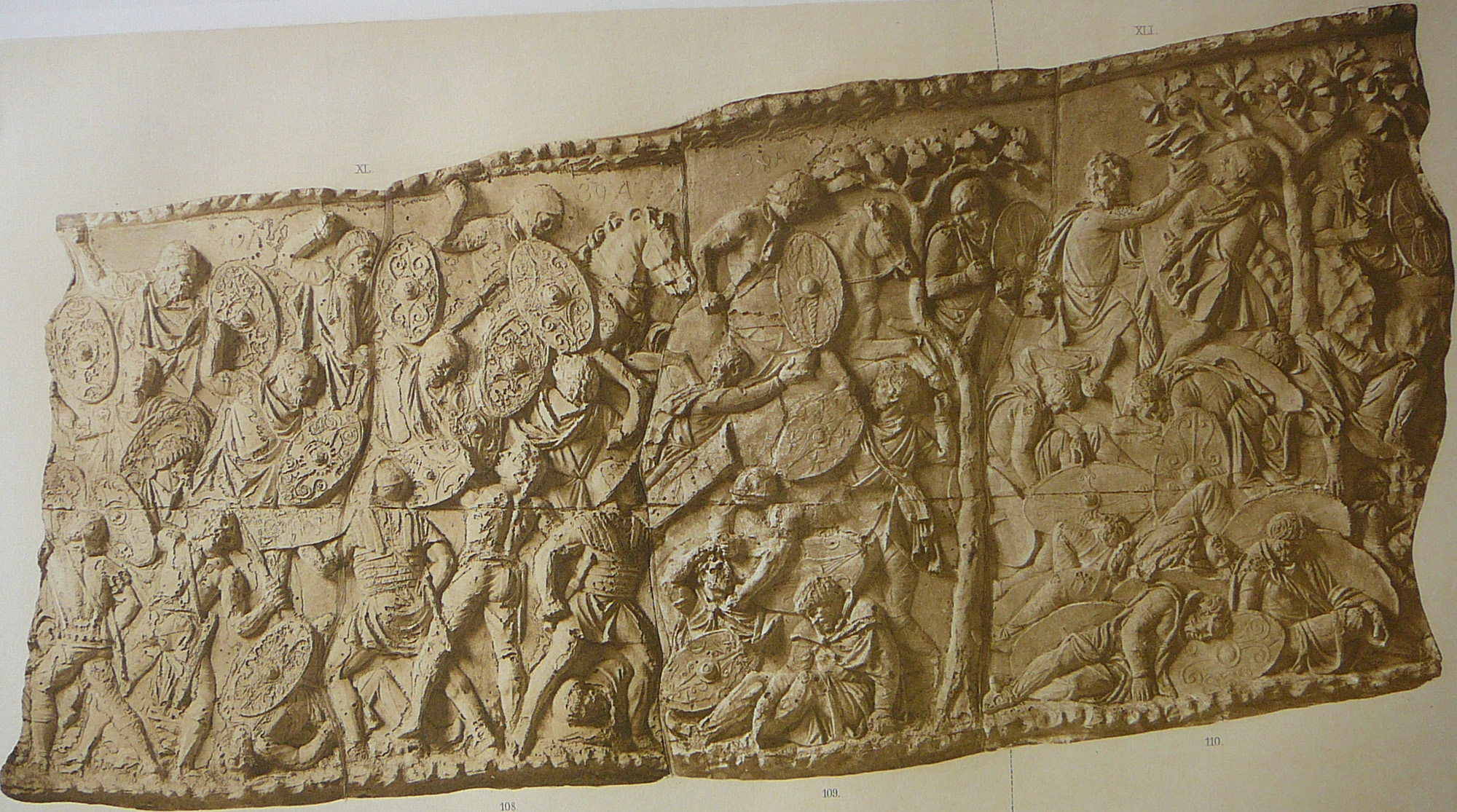
Battle scene between the Roman and Dacian armies

The conclusion of the Dacian Wars marked a triumph for Rome and its armies. Trajan announced 123 days of celebrations throughout the Empire. Dacia's rich gold mines were secured and it is estimated that Dacia then contributed 700 million Denarii per annum to the Roman economy, providing finance for Rome's future campaigns and assisting with the rapid expansion of Roman towns throughout Europe. The remains of the mining activities are still visible, especially at Roșia Montană. One hundred thousand male slaves were sent back to Rome; and to discourage future revolts, legions XIII Gemina and V Macedonica were permanently posted in Dacia. The conquered half (southern) of Dacia was annexed, becoming a province while the northern part remained free but never formed a state.

The two wars were notable victories in Rome's extensive expansionist campaigns, gaining Trajan the people's admiration and support. The conclusion of the Dacian Wars marked the beginning of a period of sustained growth and relative peace in Rome. Trajan began extensive building projects and was so prolific in claiming credit that he was given the nickname Ivy.

As a consequence of the war, Dacia went through a huge demographic change. In the province of Dacia, out of 3000 identified personal names only 60 were of Dacian, while 2200 were of Roman origin.

...Trajan, after he had subdued Dacia, had transplanted thither an infinite number of men from the whole Roman world, to people the country and the cities; as the land had been exhausted of inhabitants in the long war maintained by Decebalus.

— Eutropius: Abridgement of Roman History

Most of the Dacian population was from now outside Transylvania, known as the Free Dacians, who continuously raided the province allying themselves with the Sarmatians, while the insiders (who were divided up by the Romans to tribes) made at least two rebellions against Roman authority.

== See also ==
- Dacian warfare
- Illyrian Wars
- Roman-Persian Wars
- Marcomannic Wars
- Jewish-Roman wars

== Sources and further reading ==
- Le Roux, Patrick (1998). Le Haut-Empire Romain en Occident, d'Auguste aux Sévères (in French). Paris: Seuil. ISBN 978-2-02-025932-3.
