= Battle of Adamclisi =

Battle between the Roman Empire and the Dacians (101/102)

- Part of Trajan's Dacian Wars
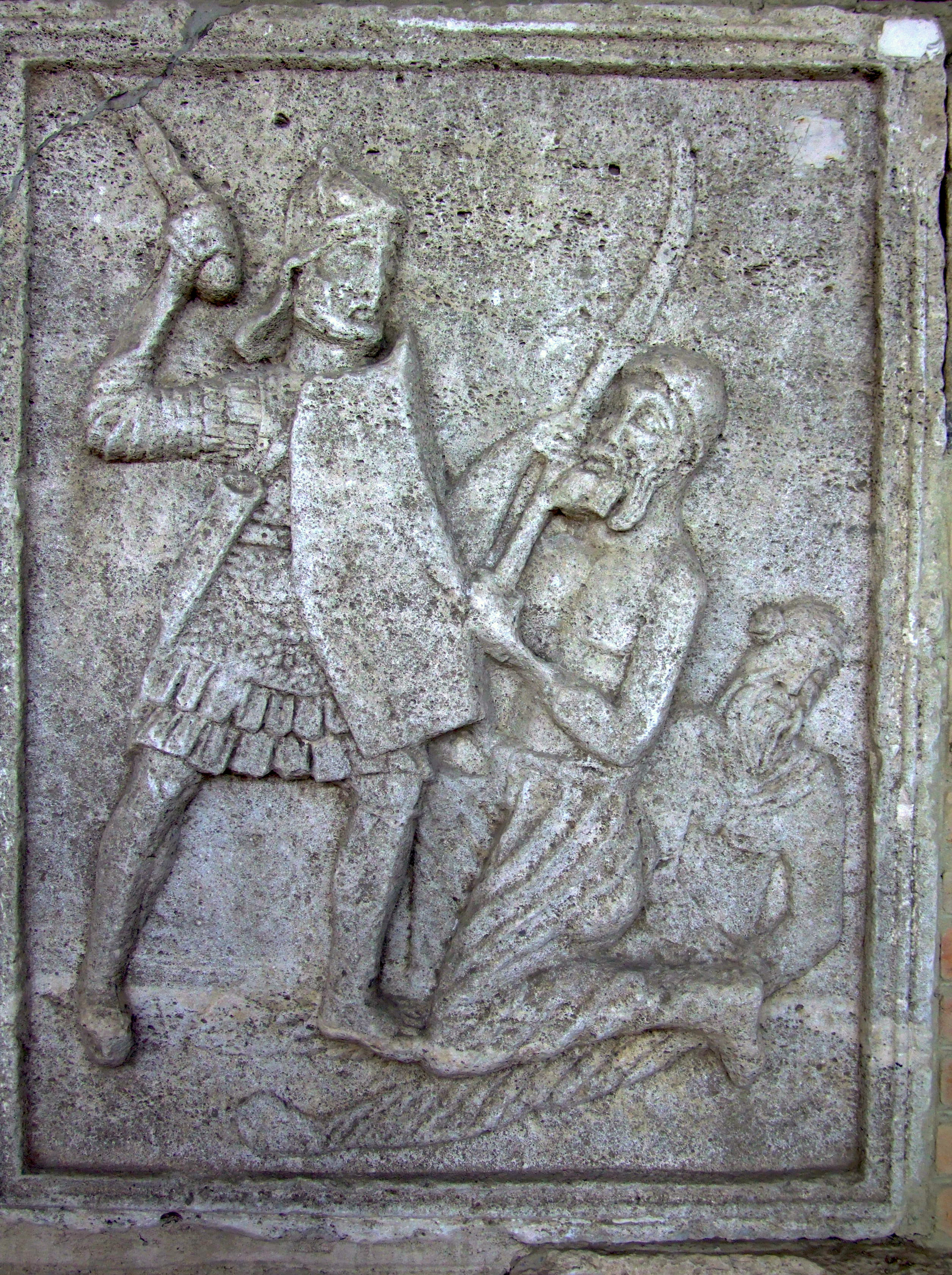
Date	Winter 102
Location	Adamclisi, Dobruja, Romania 44°05′00″N 27°57′00″E
Result	Roman victory

Belligerents
Dacia and its Roxolani and Germanic Bastarnae allies	Roman Empire

Commanders and leaders
Decebalus	Trajan (WIA)

Strength
Unknown	Unknown

Casualties and losses
Very heavy	Moderate to heavy
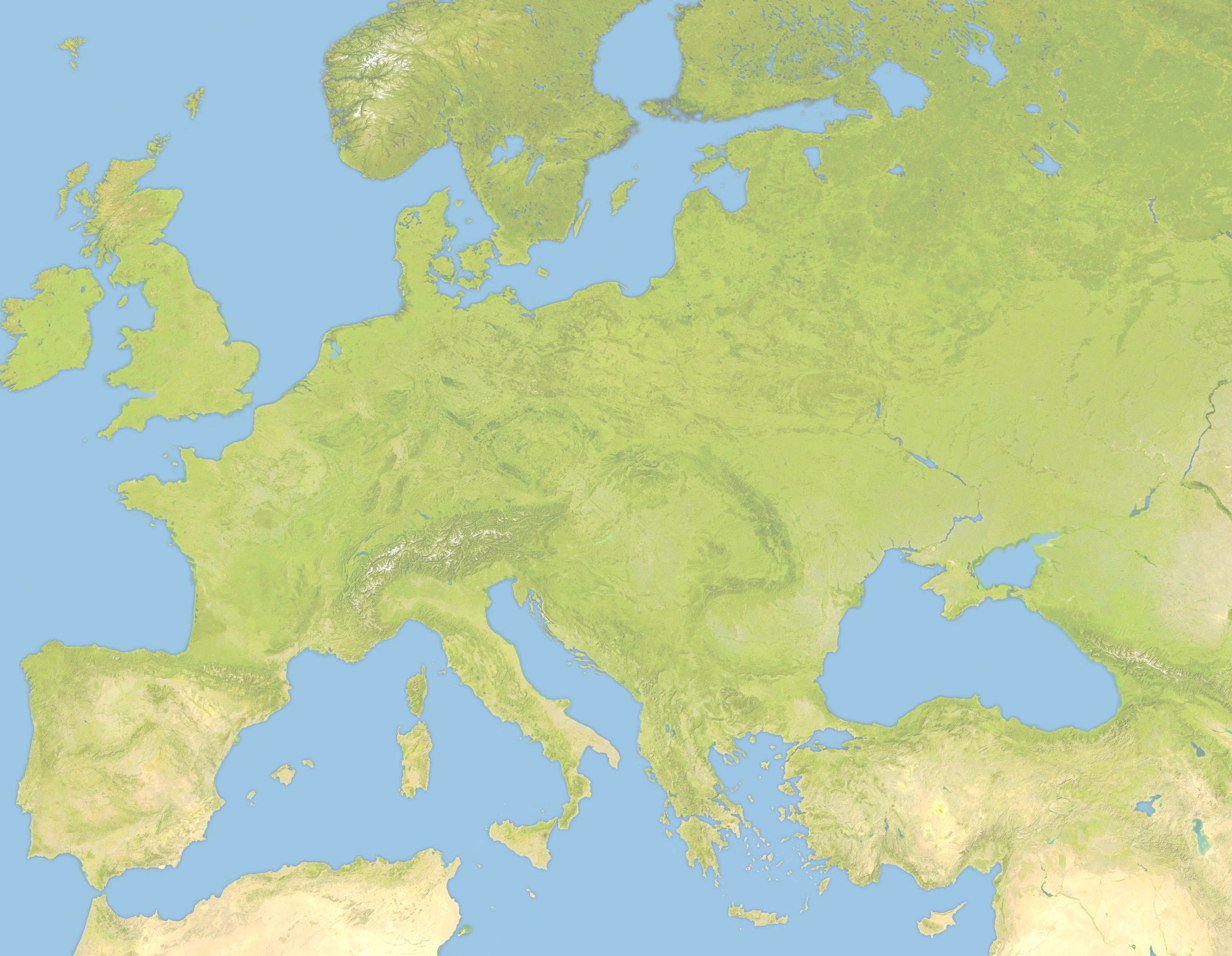
- Location within Romania Battle of Adamclisi (Black Sea) Battle of Adamclisi (Europe without the extreme north)

The Battle of Adamclisi was a major clash during the Dacian Wars, fought in the winter of 101 to 102 between the Roman Empire and the Dacians near Adamclisi, in modern Romania.

== Background ==
After the victory of Third Battle of Tapae, Emperor Trajan decided to wait until spring to continue his offensive on Sarmizegetusa, the capital of Dacia. The Dacian king Decebalus benefited from this, and made out a plan along with the neighboring allied tribes of the Roxolans and Bastarnae, to attack south of the Danube, in the Roman province of Moesia, in an attempt to force the Romans to leave their positions in the mountains near Sarmizegetusa.

== Battle ==
The Dacian army, together with the Roxolani and the Bastarnae, crossed the frozen Danube but, because the weather was not cold enough, the ice broke under their weight, causing many to die in the frozen water.

Trajan moved his army from the mountains, following the Dacians into Moesia. A first battle was fought at night somewhere near the town of Nicopolis, a battle with few casualties on either side and with no crucial result. However, as the Romans received reinforcements, they were able to corner the Dacio-Sarmatian army.

The decisive battle was fought at Adamclisi, a difficult battle for both the Dacians and the Romans. Even though the outcome of the battle was a decisive Roman victory, both sides suffered very heavy casualties.

== Aftermath ==
After the battle, Trajan advanced to Sarmizegetusa, Decebalus requesting a truce. Trajan agreed to the peace offerings. This time the peace was favorable to the Roman Empire: Decebalus must yield the territories occupied by the Roman army, and he must give back to the Romans all the weapons and war machines received after 89, when the Romans under Domitian were forced to pay an annual gift to the Dacians.

Decebalus was obliged to reconsider his foreign policies, and “to have friends and enemies the friends and enemies of the Roman Empire”, as described by Dio Cassius.

After the conquest of Dacia following the 105–106 war, Trajan built the Tropaeum Traiani at Adamclisi in 109, in memory of the battle. On the Tropaeum Traiani monument was a frieze comprising 54 metopes.

== See also ==
- Dacian warfare
- Capidava
