= Timeline of ancient Romania =

This section of the timeline of Romanian history concerns events from Late Neolithic (c. 3900 BC) until Late Antiquity (c. 400 AD), which took place in or are directly related with the territory of modern Romania.

== Late Neolithic and Bronze Age (3800–1200 BC) ==
=== 4th millennium BC ===
- 3900 BC – Bodrogkeresztúr-Gorneşti culture begins in Transylvania, as a continuation of Petreşti culture
- 3700 BC – Cernavodă III culture begins in Danube Valley, as a continuation of Cernavodă I culture
- 3500 BC – Copper Age begins and the areas of cultural influence start to expand again but without reaching the size of early Neolithic
- 3500 BC – Cernavodă III culture begins in Dobruja, as a continuation of Cernavodă I culture
- 3500 BC – Coţofeni culture begins in Transylvania as a continuation of Bodrogkeresztúr-Gorneşti culture
- 3500 BC – Baden culture begins in Lower Tisza/Crişana as a continuation of Bodrogkeresztúr-Gorneşti culture

=== 3rd millennium BC ===
- 3000–2800 BC – Climate becomes hotter and drier, affecting the human societies
- 2750 BC – Cucuteni culture in eastern Romania comes to an end
- 2700 BC – Transition from Copper Age to Bronze Age
  - Proto-Indo-Europeans related to the Decea Mureşului culture penetrate in Transylvania coming from the Black Sea region
  - Kostolac culture develops sporadically in Banat coming from modern day Serbia
  - Vučedol culture (3000–2200 BC) develops in Banat and western Crişana also coming from Serbia
- 2700–2000 BC – Proto-Indo-Europeans assimilate the local Eneolithic populations
- 2300–1900 BC – Verbicioara culture develops in Oltenia, Banat and western Muntenia
- 2100 BC – Otomani culture develops from a Baden culture background in a widespread area between the Mureş River, the Apuseni Mountains, and the Tisza River, up to modern-day Slovakia. It was characterized by fortified settlements and islands, the bronze deposits from Apa, Valea Chioarului in Transylvania, and Hajdúsámson in Hungary, the typical full handle swords and the axes with disc, the practice of inhumation, and later of cremation, and with the sanctuary of Sălacea

=== 2nd millennium BC ===
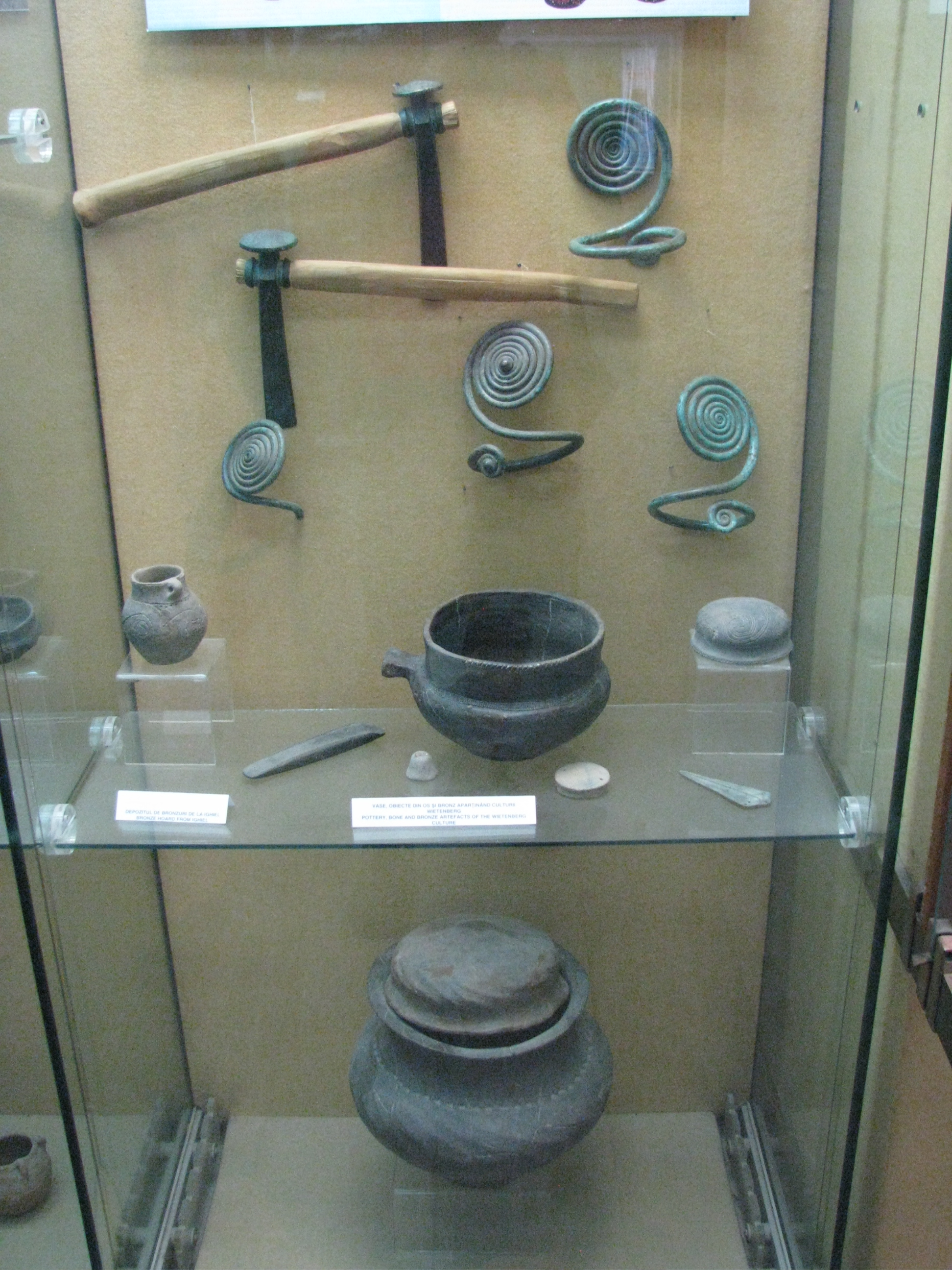
Pottery, bone and bronze artefacts of the Wietenberg culture. In display at National Museum of the Union, Alba Iulia

- 2000 BC – Early Bronze Age starts
  - Due to its richness in copper, Transylvania becomes one of the most important metallurgical centers in Europe
  - Nir culture develops
  - Glina III-Schneckenberg culture develops in Muntenia and extends into Oltenia and south eastern Transylvania; it is characterized by settlements on any terrain, and the practices of inhumation and incinerations in cists
- 2000–1800 BC – Cucuteni B culture destroyed
- 1700 BC
  - Glina culture begins in Muntenia and Oltenia
  - Otomani culture ends in Crişana
- 1700–1300 BC Monteoru culture begins
- 1600 BC – Gârla Mare culture begins in Oltenia
- 1500 BC – Middle Bronze Age starts
  - Periam culture develops in southern Crişana, Banat, north-eastern Serbia and western Bulgaria; characterized by bronze jewelry and the practice of inhumation
  - Pecica culture appears as a continuation of Periam culture and expands into the middle Danube, Tisa, and lower Mureş; brings moulds for casting weapons, crouched inhumation and the gold treasures from Pecica and Rovine
  - Periam-Pecica/Mureş culture
  - Sighişoara-Wietenberg culture develops from a Coţofeni culture background in the center and the Transylvanian Plain; characterized by fortified settlements with many weapons, pottery with spiral and meander motifs, bronze deposits, Boiu-type swords, Mycenaean swords from import, golden jewellery and axes (Ţufalău), the practice of cremation and much rarely of inhumation
  - Vatina culture begins in western Banat, on lower Tisa and northern Serbia; defined by rare bronze objects
  - Verbicioara culture expands into Oltenia, eastern Muntenia, Serbia and north-western Bulgaria, with fortified settlements and a limited number of bronze artefacts
  - Monteoru culture expands from Muntenia into south-eastern Transylvania
  - Tei culture expands from Muntenia into south-eastern Transylvania
  - Suciu de Sus culture spreads into northern Transylvania, Crisana, north-eastern Hungary and south-eastern Slovakia, practicing cremation
  - Cruceni-Belegiš culture follows and replaces the Vatina culture in Serbia and western Banat; it is part of the Urnfield culture which moves from the middle Danube towards south-east; this advance leads to great dislocations of populations in the Balkan Peninsula, resulting in Dorian migration to the south, the destruction of Mycenaean civilization and expeditions of the Sea Peoples
- 1300 BC – Late Bronze Age starts
  - Sighişoara-Wietenberg culture extends into south-eastern Transylvania
  - Tribes of shepherds appear from the east as the Noua culture; characterized by bronze deposits of Uriu-Domăneşti type and metal working
- 1250–1125 BC – Transition to Iron Age: Uioara de Sus

== Iron Age (1200 BC – 400 AD) ==
=== 12th century BC ===
- 1200–500 BC – Early Iron Age/Hallstatt culture : Ferigile
- 1150 BC – Gârla Mare culture ends in Oltenia

=== 9th century BC ===
- 900–800 BC – Rafaila
- c. 800 BC – Basarabi culture begins in Muntenia, in connection with the Bosut culture, ethnically identified with Triballi or Daco-Getaes.

=== 8th century BC ===
- 700–500 BC – Poiana, Galaţi (Piroboridava)
- c. 700 BC – Scythians arrive in the Carpathians

=== 7th century BC ===
- c. 600 BC – Basarabi culture ends, possibly due to arrival of the Scythian tribes
- 657 BC or 625 BC – Histria founded

=== 6th century BC ===
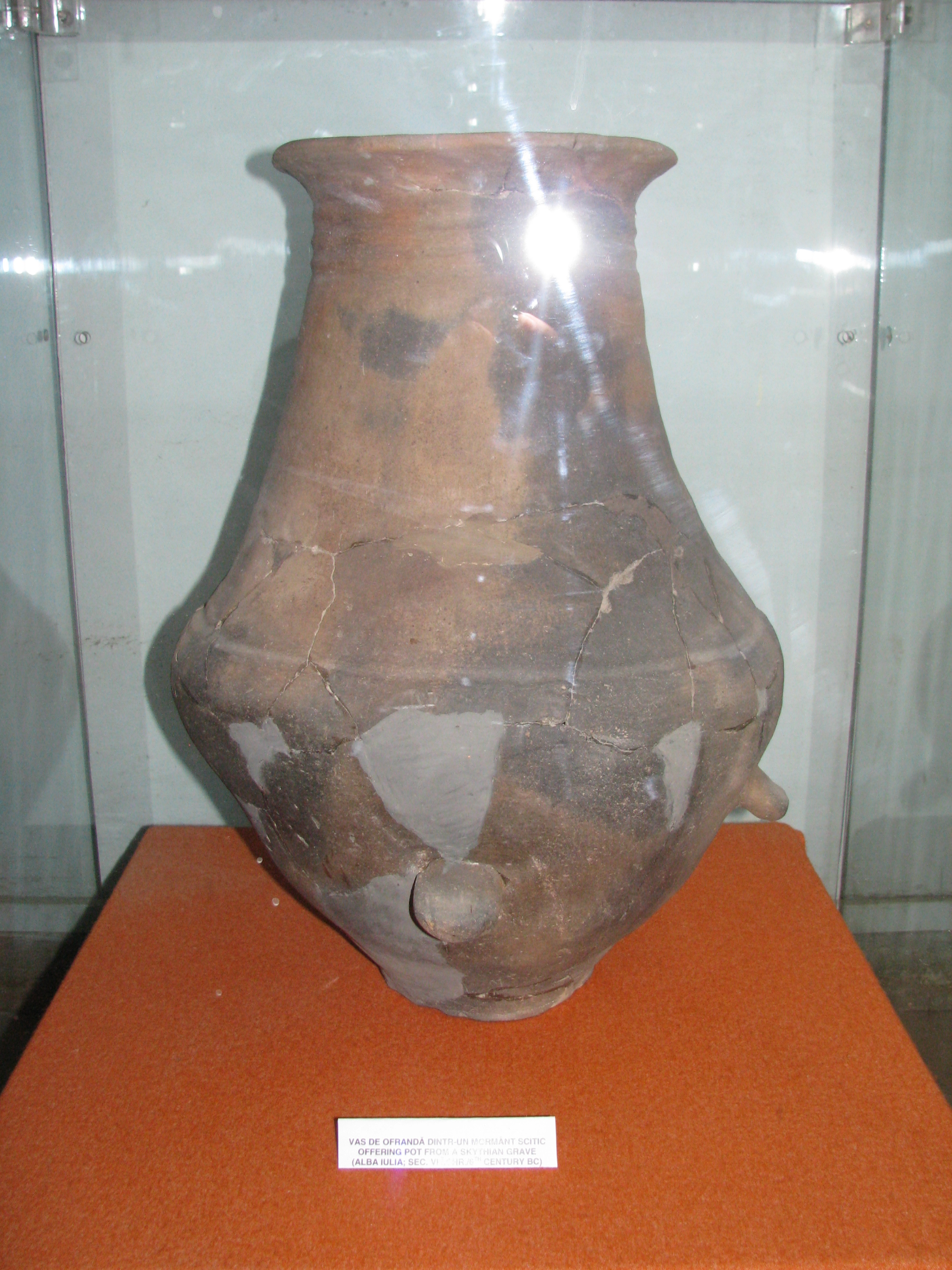
Offering pot from a Scythian grave from Alba Iulia, Romania, 6th century BC. In display at National Museum of the Union, Alba Iulia

- 6th-5th century BC
  - Tomis is founded
  - Histria, temple of Zeus Polieus
- 560 BC – Megara founds Heraclea Pontica
  - Callatis founded by Heraclea Pontica, itself a colony of Megara
- c. 550 BC – Agathyrsi, a Thraco-Scythian people, build burial tombs around modern day Ciumbrud, in contrast with the surrounding people who practice incineration
- 514 BC – Darius I led his Persian army over the Bosphorus and campaigns unsuccessfully against the Scythians on the Danube.
- 513 BC – Darius subdues the Getae and east Thrace in his war against the Scythians.
- 513 BC – first written evidence of tribes (Getae or Dacians) inhabiting the region by Herodotus

=== 5th century BC ===
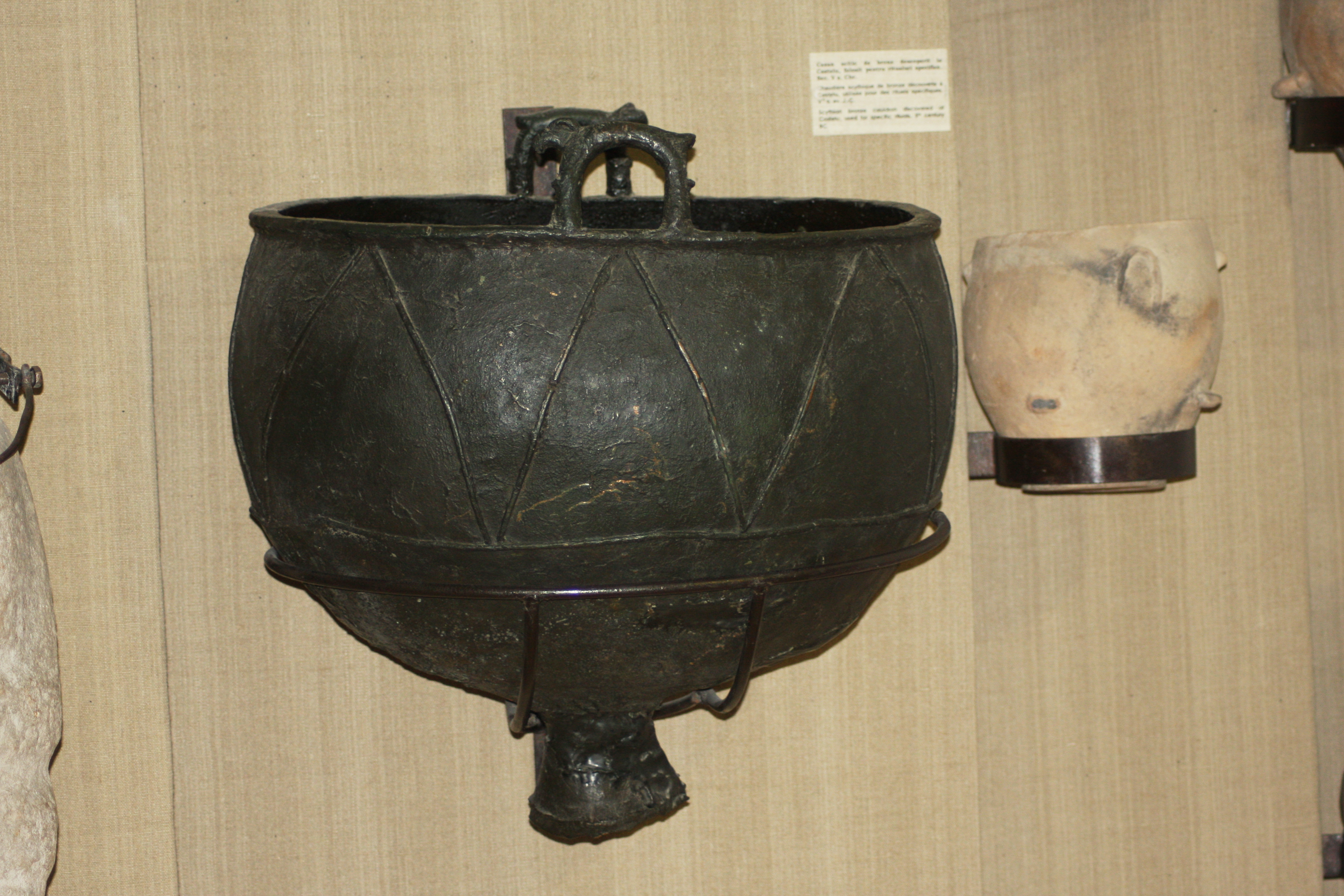
Scythian bowl, 5th century BC found at Castelu, Romania. In display at the Constanţa Museum of National History

- 500–1 BC – Middle Iron Age/La Tène culture
- 5th–4th century BC – A Getic settlement is found at Zimnicea
- 470–460 – The king Charnabon reigns over the Getae
- c. 450 BC – Democracy is imposed in Histria
- 431–424 – Odrysian king Sitalces conquests the territory of modern Dobruja ruling over the local Getic tribes

=== 4th century BC ===
- Agighiol silver treasure
- Golden Helmet of Coţofeneşti
- Callatis wall
- Callatis papyrus grave
- 364/363-353/352 BC – Clearchus, tyrant of Heraclea Pontica
- 341 – King Cothelas, also known as Gudila, ruled over the Geto-Dacian tribes from modern Dobruja
- 348 BC – Philip II of Macedon against Thracians
- 339 BC – Philip II against Scythians led by Ateas
- 339 BC – A Getic ruler, referred as "Histrianorum Rex" and located near Danube, opposes resistance to Ateas' Scythian army
- 335 BC – Alexander III of Macedon crosses the Danube fighting with Dacian tribes led by basileus Moskon
- c. 335 BC – Dacian king Sarmis/Armis rules in Transylvania
- 326 BC – The Macedon general Zopyrion leads a campaign north of Black Sea against Getae but he is defeated and ultimately killed
- 313 BC – Histria revolts against Lysimachus of Thrace
- 310–309 BC – Lysimachus besieges Callatis
- Late 4th century BC
  - Histria, sacred area burnt
  - Callatis, ustrinum
- 4th–2nd century BC
  - Histria, Hellenistic wall
  - Callatis, gilt terra-cotta miniatures

=== 3rd century BC ===
- King Zalmodegikos rules over Dobruja
- Celts migrate to Transilvania and Oltenia
- Poroina rython
- Histria, temple of Aphrodite
- Piscul Crăsanilor, Dacian settlement
- King Dromichaites rules over tribal unions in Romanian Plain
- 297 BC – Lysimachus make peace with Dromichaites
- 292 BC – Lysimachus fight against Getae and he is defeated and taken prisoner, perhaps in Piscul Crăsanilor
- 281 BC – Lysimachus dies
- 279 BC – Celts attack Histria and Delphi
- 262 BC – Histria and Callatis war against Byzantium
- 251 BC – Theoros from Callatis
- 230–130 BC – Ciumeşti necropolis

=== 2nd century BC ===
- First half of 2nd century BC – the Dacian Kingdom was led by King Oroles
- 200 BC – Callatis building inscription
- 200–150 BC – Histria ephebe inscription
- 2nd century? – Histria aqueduct
- 2nd–1st century BC – Popeşti flourishes
- 145–172 BC – Tilişca counterfeiter's coins
- 110–72/71 BC – Mithridates controls Pontic cities
- 109 BC – Dacians together with Scordisci attack Roman provinces situated south of Danube; attack repelled by M. Minucius Rufus

=== 1st century BC ===
- 82 BC – Burebista unifies the Dacians and Getae forming the first and largest Dacian Kingdom, on the territory of modern Romania and surroundings
- Early 80s BC – Burebista moves capital from Popeşti to Costeşti
- 80 BC – 106 AD – Dacian citadels
- 74 BC – Dacian Kingdom at its peak under King Burebista
- 72-71 BC – War between Pontic cities, allied with Thracians, and Romans; Callatis treaty with Rome
- 61 BC – Coalition of Greeks and barbarians (Getae and Bastarnae) defeats C. Antonius Hybrida at Histria
- c. 60 BC – Burebista leads a policy of conquest of new territories: he attacks and vanquishes the Celtic tribes of Boii and Taurisci dwelling along the Middle Danube (in what is now Slovakia)
- c. 57 BC – Burebista conquers the Black Sea shore, subjugating the Greek fortresses from Olbia to Apollonia, as well as the Danubian Plain all the way to the Balkans.
- Burebista runs expeditions against a group of Celts who lived among the Thracians and Illyrians (probably the Scordisci)

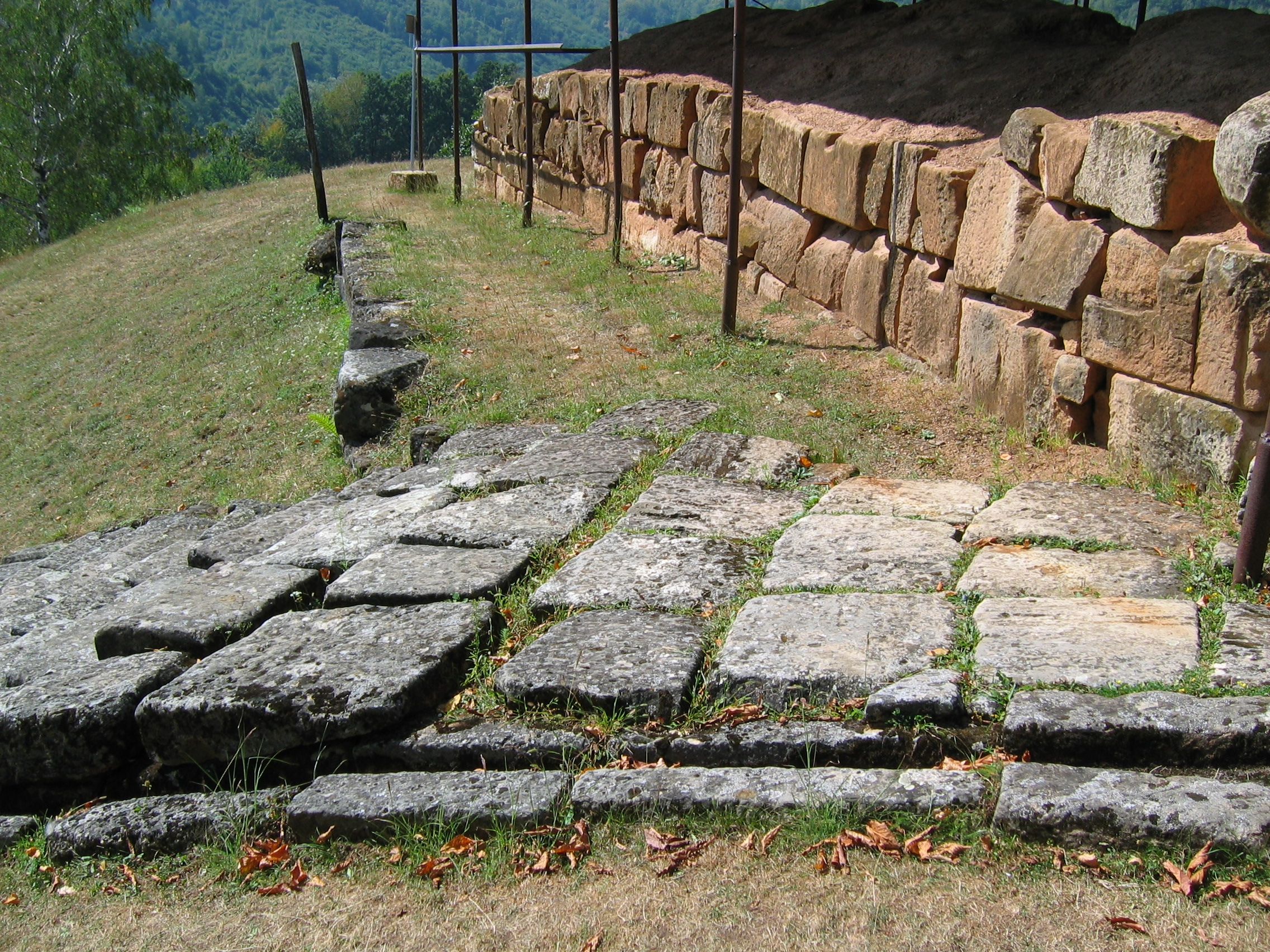
Tower house one and staircase with drain at the Dacian fortress of Costeşti

- After 50 BC – Histria, "second founding"
- 48 BC – Burebista sides with Pompey during his struggle against Julius Caesar in the Great Roman Civil War (49–45 BC), sending Akornion as an ambassador and a military adviser
- 48 BC – Citizens of Dionysopolis dedicate an inscription to Akornion, which mention this citizens' friendship to Burebista, as well as a diplomatic mission to the Dacian town named Argedava or Argidava to possibly visit Burebista's father
- c. 45 BC – Caesar emerges as victor and plans on sending legions to punish Burebista
- 44 BC
  - On March 15 Caesar is assassinated in the Senate before he can start a campaign against the Dacian Kingdom
  - Burebista is assassinated in a plot made by the tribal aristocracy, which felt that a consolidation towards a centralized state would reduce their power
  - The Dacian Kingdom is dissolved, with the exception of the nucleus around the Orăştie Mountains, while the rest being divided into four different kingdoms
- 42 BC – Geto-Dacian contingent with Brutus at the Battle of Philippi, fighting against Octavian and Mark Antony
- 27 BC – Crassus triumphs over Geto-Dacians
- Augustus Caesar sends an army against the Geto-Dacians, finding the former state of Burebista divided into five states
- 14 BC – 98 AD – Minor Dacian citadels flourish

=== 1st century ===
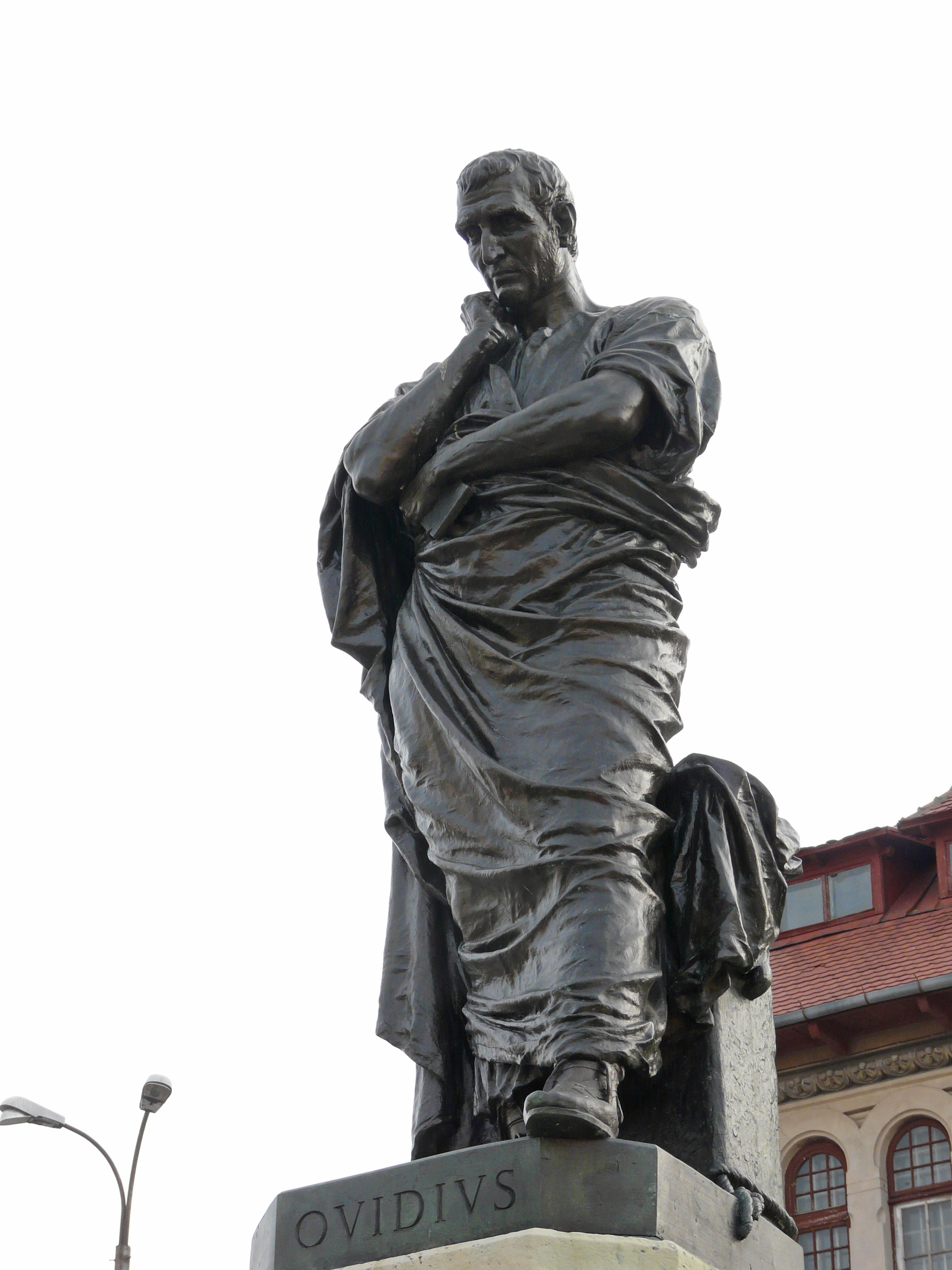
Statue of Roman poet Ovid in Constanţa (ancient Tomis, the city where he was exiled). Created in 1887 by the Italian sculptor Ettore Ferrari

- 6-12 AD – Sextus Aelius Catus destroys Muntenian towns
- 9-17 AD – Ovid in exile at Tomis
- 12 AD – Getae from Lower Moldavia attack Aegyssus and capture it temporarily; attack repelled by Odrysian king Rhoemetalces I and P. Vitellius
- 14 AD
  - Barbarians attack Troesmis
  - Dobruja becomes province of Moesia
- 15-35 AD – C. Poppaeus Sabinus, governor of Moesia
- c. 20 AD – Strabo publishes his Geographica (Geography) giving a detailed account of the Dacian Kingdom at the time of Burebista in Book VII, Chapter 3 (Mysia, Dacia, and the Danube); he mentions that Getae and Dacians speak the same language, and makes important references to the high priest Deceneus and the teachings of Zalmoxis
- 26 AD – Poppaeus Sabinus and L. Pomponius Flaccus crushes Dobrujan revolt of Thracians
- c. 49 AD – Histria's fishing rights guaranteed
- 54-68 AD – Noviodunum camp founded, during Nero's reign
- 57-67 AD – Tiberius Plautius Silvanus Aelianus, governor of Moesia
- 60-65 AD – Columella, agricultural writer, flourishes
- 69 AD – Invasion of Dacians and Roxolans in Moesia, south of Danube; response of governor M. Aponinus Saturninus
- c. 77 AD – Pliny the Elder publishes his Naturalis Historia (Natural History), gives an account of the Dacians, noting that the Romans call the Getae, Daci
- 81-96 AD – Bărboşi naval base founded during Domitian's reign
- Before 84 AD – Duras becomes King of the Dacians and consolidates the consolidate the core of Dacia around Sarmizegetusa
- 84 AD – Diurpaneus reorganizes the Dacian army, and begins minor raids upon the heavily fortified Roman province of Moesia, on the southern course of the Danube river
- 85 AD
  - King Duras orders more vigorous attacks into Moesia, raids being led by Diurpaneus
  - Led by Diurpaneus the Dacians cross the Danube, wreak considerable havoc and kill the Moesian governor Oppius Sabinus.
  - After this attack, the Roman emperor Domitian personally arrives in Moesia accompanied by a large force commanded by Cornelius Fuscus, and possibly bases himself in Naissus
  - Summer 85 AD – Praetorian prefect Fuscus and Funisulanus Vettonianus successfully drives the Dacians back across the border
  - Autumn 85 AD – Domitian returns to Rome and celebrates the tenth and eleventh salutations for driving out the invaders
- 85-89 AD – Hadrian commands Legio V Macedonica
- 86 AD
  - Domitian celebrates a triumph in Rome between March 17 and May 15 for the victory over the Dacians
  - Domitian reorganizes the province of Moesia into Moesia Inferior and Moesia Superior, and plans a future attack into Dacia.
- 87 AD
  - Cornelius Fuscus leads five or six legions across the Danube into Dacia on a bridge of ships
  - The Roman legions are ambushed at Tapae and face disaster with complete destruction of Legio V Alaudae (see First Battle of Tapae)
  - Cornelius Fuscus dies in the battle, the battle standard of the Praetorian Guard is lost and the Dacians capture Roman flags and war machines
  - Rome must pay tribute to the Dacians in exchange for a vague recognition of Rome's importance.
  - King Duras knowingly offers the kingship to Diurpaneus as a recognition of his diplomatic, military and leadership skills
  - Diurpaneus dubbs himself Decebalus, meaning "with the strength of ten [men]" or simply "The Brave," and is crowned king of Dacia
- 88 AD
  - The Roman offensive into Dacia continues, with general Tettius Iulianus in command
  - The army starts from Viminacium following the same route Cornelius Fuscus had in the previous year and heads towards Sarmizegetusa, the capital of Dacia
  - In Rome, Domitian celebrates the Secular Games and possibly plans a trip to the Danube to accept Dacians' surrender in person
  - Late 88, a battle takes place mainly in the same area, at Tapae, and this time the Romans are victorious
  - Facing a difficult road to Sarmizegetusa and for fear of falling into a trap, Iulianus abandons the offensive
  - Decebalus sues for peace but Domitian refuses
- 89 AD
  - Domitian attacks the Germanic Suebi tribes of Marcomanni and Quadi, possibly as a punitive action since the Germanics did not provide assistance in the Dacian conflict
  - After Marcomanni defeat the Romans in Pannonia and Rome faces wars on two fronts, Domitian comes in person to the Danube and accepts the peace with the Dacians
  - Later in the year, Decebalus sends Diegis, general, member of the Dacian royal family and brother of Decebalus, to Rome to accept the diadem from Domitian and the generous settlement
  - Decebalus becomes a client king of Rome, he receives money, craftsmen and war machines to protect the empire's borders
  - For Domitians' achievements in Dacia, the Roman Senate decrees a huge equestrian statue, impressive games take places and throughout the empire statues are erected
- after 89 AD
  - Instead of using the money as Rome intended, Decebalus builds new citadels in the mountains, in important strategic points, and reinforces the existing ones.
- 92 AD
  - A coalition of Dacians and Rhoxolani Sarmatians completely slaughter the Legio XXI Rapax at Tropaeum Traiani, modern Romania, in the First Battle of Adamclisi
  - Angustia diploma
- 96 AD – In September, Domitian is assassinated, one potential reason being the unfavorable peace with Decebalus

=== 2nd century ===
- 101-102 AD – First campaign of Emperor Trajan against Dacians
  - Romans build castra at Drobeta, Sucidava, Romula, Dierna, Tibiscum, Bucium (Orăştioara), Arcidava, Centum Putei, Berzobis, Micia, Gilău, Bologa(?), Buciumi, Tihău-Odorhei line, Mălăeşti (Sfârleanca), Drajna de Sus, Angustia(?), Bumbeşti, Răcarii de Jos
- 105 AD – Drobeta, stone camp
- 105-106 AD – Second Dacian War
  - Limes Alutanus: Buridava, Slăveni, Arutela
  - Romans build camps at Potaissa, Napoca, Porolissum, Ulmetum; Danube limes
  - Apulum municipium
- 106 AD
  - Battle of Sarmisegetusa
  - South-western Dacia is annexed to the Roman Empire as the Province of Dacia
- 107-109 AD – The road Dierna – Ulpia Traiana Sarmizegetusa – Apulum – Potaissa – Napoca – Porolissum is built
- 108-110 AD – Ulpia Traiana Sarmizegetusa founded
- 109 AD – Tropaeum Traiani, trophy and town
- 112 AD – Legio V Macedonica at Troesmis
- 113 AD – Trajan's Column is dedicated in Rome
- 117 AD – Iazyges and Roxolans attack Dacia; Dacia's governor C. Iulius Quadratus Bassus dies in battle; Bridge of Apollodorus on fire
- 117-138 AD – Reign of Hadrian
  - Mălăeşti (Sfârleanca), Drajna de Sus, Târgşor abandoned
  - Rădăcineşti castra is built
  - Răcari castra rebuilt in stone
- 118 AD
  - Hadrian visits Dobruja
  - Apulum becomes seat of government of Dacia
- 119 AD
  - First administrative reorganization of Dacia under Hadrian
  - Consolidation of Limes Alutanus
  - Begin the creation of Limes Transalutanus
- 120 AD – Diploma from Porolissum mentioning the governor of Dacia Superior, Cn. Minucinus Faustinux Sex. Iulius Severus
- 124 AD
  - Dacia divided into three provinces
  - Hadrian visits Dobruja and Napoca
  - Napoca and Drobeta become municipia
- 131-67 AD – Alburnus Maior gold mines flourish
- 132 AD – Ulpia Traiana amphitheater built
- 133 AD – Gherla diploma mentioning Flavius Italicus as military commander of Dacia Porolissensis
- 138-161 AD – Reign of Atoninus Pius
  - Moors garrison Răcari
  - Dobruja flourishes
  - Capidava, a customs-station
- 138-222 AD – Hobiţa villa rustica flourishes
- 143 AD
  - Attack of free Dacians; repelled by Roman troops
  - Căşei camp
- 148 AD – Gilău camp rebuilt
- before 150 AD – Orheiul Bistriţei, military tile kiln
- 156-157 AD – Attack of free Dacians; repelled by M. Statius Priscus, legatus of Dacia Superior
- 157 AD
  - Consolidation of Someș limes
  - Arcidava, Micia, stone camps
  - Porolissum amphitheater rebuilt in stone
- 158 AD – Ulpia Traiana amphitheater repaired
- 160 AD – Invasion of Costoboci
- 161-180 – Marcus Aurelius' reign
- 160-170 AD – Tomis, idealized head of girl
- 162-172 AD, 177-180 – Marcomannic War
  - Ulpia Traiana suburban villas burned
  - Slăveni camp destroyed
  - Citera camp at Porolissum rebuilt in stone
- 167-168 AD
  - Legio V Macedonica transferred from Troesmis to Potaissa
  - Apulum military headquarters for all Dacia
  - Last administrative reorganization of Dacia
- 170 AD – Tropeum Traiani mentioned as municipium
- 180-193 AD Commondus' reign
  - Napoca colony
  - No-man's-land on northwest frontier
- 180-183 AD – Sucidava customs-station
- 183-184 AD – The generals D. Clodius Albinus and C. Pescenninus Niger fight successfully against free Dacians
- 193-211 AD – Septimius Severus
  - Limes Transalutanus built
  - Fourteen camps Flămânda-Cumidava, including Jidava
  - Apahida villa rustica
  - Romula: brick circuit-wall, curia
- 193-198 AD – Drobeta, Romula, Apulum, Porolissum, Dierna, Ampelum are made colonies
- 195 AD – Potaissa baths enlarged

=== 3rd century ===
- 201 AD – Bumbeşti camp rebuilt in stone
- 202 AD – Severus in Dobruja
- 204 AD – Micia, Moors' temple
- 205 AD – Slăveni castra rebuilt
- 211-217 AD – Carcalla
  - Mănerau villa rustica
  - Potaissa colony
  - Bologa and Buciumi rebuilt
- 212 AD – Decree of universal citizenship
- 213 AD
  - Caracalla visits Porolissum
  - Limes Porolissensis rebuilt
- 215 AD – Last evidence of Roman gold mining
- 217 AD – Macrinus honored by Histria
- 217-222 – AD Elagabalus
  - Bucium (Orăştioara) camp walls repaired
- 222-235 AD – Severus Alexander
  - Council of Three Dacias meets at Ulpia Traiana
  - Ad Mediam camp restored
  - Micia amphitheater goes out of use
- 229 AD – Dio Cassius consul
- 230-40 AD – Arutela, last coins
- 235-38 AD
  - Maximinus Thrax fights against Iazyges and free Dacians
  - Road repairs in Dobruja
- 238-244 AD – Gordian III
  - Potaissa basilica
  - Carpi invade Dobruja
- 244-49 AD – Philip the Arab
  - Carpi raid Ricari, Jidava
  - Limes Transalutanus abandoned
  - Sucidava, stone circuitwall
  - Bumbeşti, last coins
- 246 AD – Right to mint bronze coins
- 247 AD – Millennium of Rome celebrated
- 248 AD
  - Romula mentioned as colonia, circuit wall, third phase
  - Goths invade Moesia; Histria is destroyed
- 249-251 – Decius
- 251 AD
  - Porolissum (Pomet) camp repaired
  - Decius dies in battle
- 253 AD – Tibiscum mentioned as municipium
- 256 AD – End of monetary emissions in Dacia
- 260-268 AD – Gallienus
  - Ulpia Traiana, Porolissum, latest coins
  - Goths sack Tibiscum
  - Usurper Regalianus claims descent from Decebalus
- 263 AD – Sarmatians burn Callatis extramural quarter
- 267 AD
  - Attack led by Goths and Heruli in Dobruja; Histria sacked
  - Wall rebuilt
- 268-70 AD – Claudius Gothicus
  - Goths attack Tomis
  - Claudius beats them at Naissus
- 270-75 – Aurelian
- 271 AD – Dacia officially abandoned; retreat of Roman occupation of Dacia
  - 275-76 Tacitus: detachment of Legio XIII Gemina at Desa (to 305)
- 284-305 AD – Diocletian
  - Dinogetia citadel
  - Capidava rebuilt
- 295 AD – Goths destroy Tropaeum Traiani
- 3rd-4th century AD – Târgşor, Sarmatian necropolis

=== 4th century ===
- 303-304 AD Anti-Christian persecutions; martyrdom in Scythia Minor (Dobruja)
- 306-337 AD Constantine I
  - Drobeta, Sucidava Ulmetum, Axiopolis camps rebuilt
  - Tomis, mosaic building
- 315-316 AD – Attack of Goths and Carpi; repelled by Constantine the Great
- 316 AD – Tropaeum Traiani rebuilt
- 317 AD – Constantine's son Crispus appointed Caesar
- 324-28 – Constantiniana Dafne fortress is built
- 324-30 AD – Constantinople built
- 324-361 AD Constantius II
  - Tomis renamed for him (?)
- 328 AD Romula milestone
- Sucidava and Constantiana Daphne bridges
- 331-332 AD – Gothic attack of south Danube provinces; repelled by Constantine the Great
- 332 AD – Goths and Taifals become foederati
- 337 AD Capidava rebuilt
- 340-60 AD Barbarians transferred en masse into Dobruja
- 361-63 AD Rebuilt and consolidation of Danube limes
- 364-75 AD Valentinian
  - Coins at Porolissum
- 364-378 AD – Valens
- 367 AD
  - Constantiniana Daphne and Noviodunum bridges
  - Pietroasa treasure
- 368-69 AD Orthodox bishop Betranion opposes Arianism imposed by emperor Valens
- 375 AD – Huns sack Dinogetia
- 376 AD – Huns defeat Ostrogoth Kingdom and attack Visigoths
- 379 – 395 Theodosius I
  - Coins at Apulum, Porolissum
- Biertan Christian inscription
- 381 AD – Carps are mentioned for the last time
- 383-408 AD Arcadius
  - Coins at Dierna

== End of ancient history in Romania ==
The date used as the end of the ancient era is entirely arbitrary. Not all historians agree on the ending dates of ancient history, which frequently falls somewhere in the 5th, 6th, or 7th century. Western scholars usually date the end of ancient history with the fall of Rome in AD 476, the death of the emperor Justinian I in AD 565, or the coming of Islam in AD 632 as the end of ancient European history.

== See also ==
- Timeline of ancient history
- Bronze Age in Romania
- Dacia
- Roman Dacia
