= Bosut Gradina =

Archeological site in Serbia

Gradina
- Location within Serbia
- 45.075°N 19.145°E
- Type: Settlement
- Periods: Iron Age
- Cultures: Bosut culture
- Location: Šid municipality, Serbia
- Region: Syrmia

Bosut Gradina (Serbian: Градина на Босуту / Gradina na Bosutu) is an archeological site in Serbia. It is located on the left bank of the Bosut river, located between the villages of Vašica and Batrovci, Šid municipality, Syrmia District, province of Vojvodina. The site contains remains from several time periods, including Neolithic, Eneolithic, Bronze Age, and Iron Age findings. Most remarkable findings are remains of Iron Age Bosut culture, which was named after this archaeological locality.

== Archaeological findings ==
This site incorporating following findings:

- Neolithic period: findings of Sopot-Lengyel culture,
- Eneolithic period: findings of Boleras-Černavoda III culture,
- Bronze Age: findings of Vinkovci culture and Vatin culture,
- Iron Age: findings of Bosut culture and of Scordisci settlement.

== Bosut culture ==
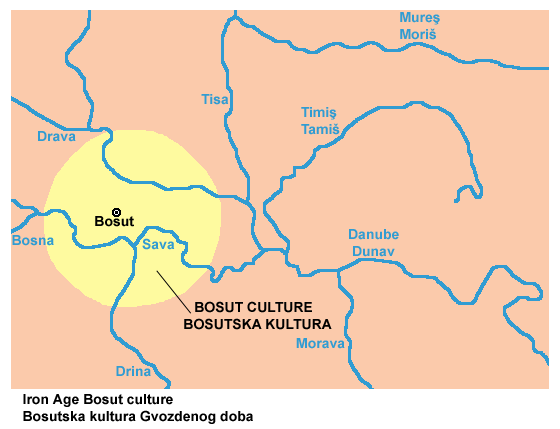
Map of the territorial extent of the Bosut culture

The Bosut culture, that was named after the Gradina site, is dated into early Iron Age and it is generally divided into three development stages. It is sometimes grouped with related Basarabi culture into Bosut-Basarabi complex. There are different views about ethnic identity of the people of Bosut culture; according to one view, they were Triballi, while according to another view, they were Daco-Getaes.

== History of research ==
Excavations on this locality were performed from 1964 to 1988. Bosut Gradina was declared Archaeological Site of Great Importance in 1991, and it is protected by Republic of Serbia.

== See also ==
- Archaeological Sites of Great Importance
- Tourism in Serbia
- Tourism in Vojvodina
