= Burebista =

1st-century BC Thracian king of the Getae and Dacians

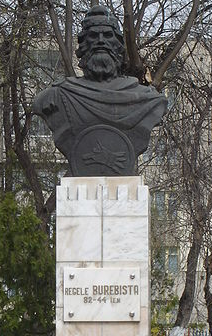
- Statue of Burebista located in Călărași

Dacian king
- Reign: 82/61–45/44 BC
- Successor: Cotiso
- Died: 45/44 BC

Burebista (Ancient Greek: Βυρεβίστας, Βοιρεβίστας) was the king of the Getae and Dacian tribes from 82/61 BC to 45/44 BC. He was the first king who successfully unified the tribes of the Dacian kingdom, which comprised the area located between the Danube, Tisza, and Dniester rivers, and modern day Romania and Moldova. In the 7th and 6th centuries BC it became home to the Thracian peoples, including the Getae and the Dacians. From the 4th century to the middle of the 2nd century BC the Dacian peoples were influenced by La Tène Celts who brought new technologies with them into Dacia. Sometime in the 2nd century BC, the Dacians expelled the Celts from their lands. Dacians often warred with neighbouring tribes, but the relative isolation of the Dacian peoples in the Carpathian Mountains allowed them to survive and even to thrive. By the 1st century BC the Dacians had become the dominant power.

From 61 BC onwards Burebista pursued a series of conquests that expanded the Dacian kingdom. The tribes of the Boii and Taurisci were destroyed early in his campaigns, followed by the conquest of the Bastarnae and probably the Scordisci peoples. He led raids throughout Thrace, Macedonia, and Illyria. From 55 BC the Greek cities on the west coast of the Black Sea were conquered one after another. These campaigns inevitably culminated in conflict with Rome in 48 BC, at which point Burebista gave his support to Pompey. This in turn made him an enemy to Julius Caesar, who decided to start a campaign against Dacia. This plan fell through in 44 BC when Caesar was assassinated. Burebista himself was assassinated in a plot by the Dacian aristocracy at around the same time.

After Burebista's death, the empire he had created broke up into smaller kingdoms. From the reign of Tiberius to Domitian, Dacian activity was reduced into a defensive state. The Romans abandoned plans of mounting an invasion against Dacia. In 86 AD the Dacian king, Decebalus, successfully re-united the Dacian kingdom under his control. Domitian attempted a hasty invasion against the Dacians that ended in disaster. A second invasion brought peace between Rome and Dacia for nearly a decade, until Trajan became emperor in 98 AD. Trajan also pursued two conquests of Dacia. The first, in 101–102 AD, concluded in a Roman victory. Decebalus was forced to agree to harsh terms of peace, but did not honour them, leading to a second invasion of Dacia in 106 AD that ended the independence of the Dacian kingdom.

== Early references ==
Only few ancient sources on Burebista survive: Strabo: Geographica 7.3.5, 7.3.11 and 16.2.39 (who spells his name Byrebistas and Boirebistas); Jordanes: Getica 67 (spells his name Buruista); a marble inscription found in Balchik, Bulgaria (now housed at the National Museum in Sofia), which represents a decree by the citizens of Dionysopolis about Akornion and another inscription found in Nesebar.

== Dacian kingdom ==
The area roughly located between the Danube, Tisza and Dniester rivers – approximately coinciding with modern-day Romania – became home to a varied group of Thracian peoples, including the Getae and Dacians, sometime around the 7th to 6th centuries BC. The Getae and Dacians are related but distinct peoples that are sometimes treated as a single group under the name of Geto-Dacians. The Getae and the Dacians shared many cultural and linguistic similarities. Living in the lower Danube basin, the Getae were able to establish regular trade with the Greek cities along the coast of the Black Sea. The Dacians were located in the Carpatho-Danubian basin along the southern border of the Carpathian Mountains. This relative geographic isolation allowed the Dacians to survive catastrophic struggles – often with the Getae – and thrive to become the dominant tribe by the 1st century BC.

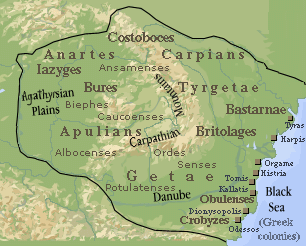
Approximate map of Dacia, at the beginning of Burebista's reign, circa 82 BC.

Before Burebista's rule, the Dacians had experienced a succession of kings through the period 450 to 60 BC. The kings included Dromichaetes, Oroles, and Rubobostes in the 3rd and 2nd centuries BC. From the 4th century BC to the 2nd century BC the La Tène Celts of the Danube, Alpines, and Balkans influenced the Dacian culture. La Tène material culture was found in the central and north-west regions of Dacia. The development of a La Tène-based economy in the 3rd and 2nd centuries BC allowed the consolidation of political power through tribal unions. Such regional unions were found among both the Transylvanian Dacians under the rule of Rubobostes and the Moldavian and Muntenian Getae in Argedava.

It is from the La Tène that the Dacians were introduced to the potter's wheel, superior metal-working techniques, and probably a tradition of minting coins. In homes were found a combination of Celtic and Dacian pottery, and certain Celtic-style graves contain Dacian style vessels. This suggests a sort of co-existence and fusion between the cultures. Sometime after around 150 BC, however, evidence of La Tène culture peters out, around the same time the Dacian culture began to mature, as evidenced by population and economic growth. Under Rubobstes the authority of the Dacians appears to have increased, thus ending the dominance of the Celtic culture, and leading to the Celts being expelled from the area or merging into the culture, or both. There is archaeological evidence to suggest that relations between Dacians and Celts living in the areas north and west of Dacia continued. Painted ceramics of late La Tène-style have been found in Dacian sites in west and central Dacia. Some of these ceramics were imported while others were made by Dacian potters imitating Celtic style. A stable monarchy, however, only developed when Burebista became king. Burebista's accession came with the expulsion of Celts around 60 BC when his forces moved through to the middle Danube region, and with the support of the religious establishment and leaders in Dacia which brought around a stricter moral code in the Dacian kingdom. Around this time the pottery of the Dacian style began appearing in Celtic settlements in Central Europe, including the area covered by the former Yugoslavia, especially in Gomolava, Yugoslavia, and Budapest, Hungary.

== Reign of Burebista ==
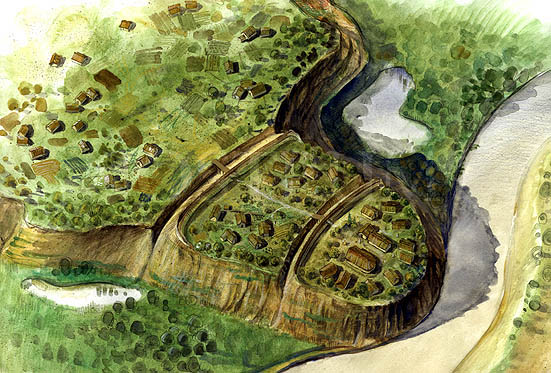
Illustration of the Dacian dava discovered in Popești, Giurgiu, Romania, and a potential candidate for the site of the Dacian capital at the time of Burebista's accession, Argedava

=== Date of ascension ===
The exact date that Burebista came to reign over the Dacians is debated among scholars; University of Illinois professor Keith Hitchins gave a starting date for Burebista's reign of 82 BC, while historian Matthew Bunson, and authors John Middleton and Michael Schmitz suggest a starting date around 61–60 BC. The historian John Koch states that Burebista founded an empire sometime during the 1st century BC and that around 61 BC Burebista expelled the Celts and moved into the middle Danube.

=== Development of Burebista's polity ===
This alliance was probably a weakly centralized state, with a military organization similar to that of the Hellenistic kingdoms. The exact degree of centralization is a matter of debate, with archaeologists such as Kris Lockyear denying the existence of a state, saying the archaeological evidence shows regional diversity and only a few region-wide trends. Others, such as historian Alexandru Diaconescu, dispute this and conclude that there was a centralized political structure. In the Orăștie Mountains, Burebista built a system of stone fortifications on high ground; the most important of such hill forts are located today in the villages of Costești, Blidaru, Piatra Roșie, and Bănița. These citadels, which exhibited Greek military architecture, coupled with the presence of Burebista and his armed forces, served to secure the Dacian people internally.

=== Conquests and external policy ===
==== Neighbouring tribes ====
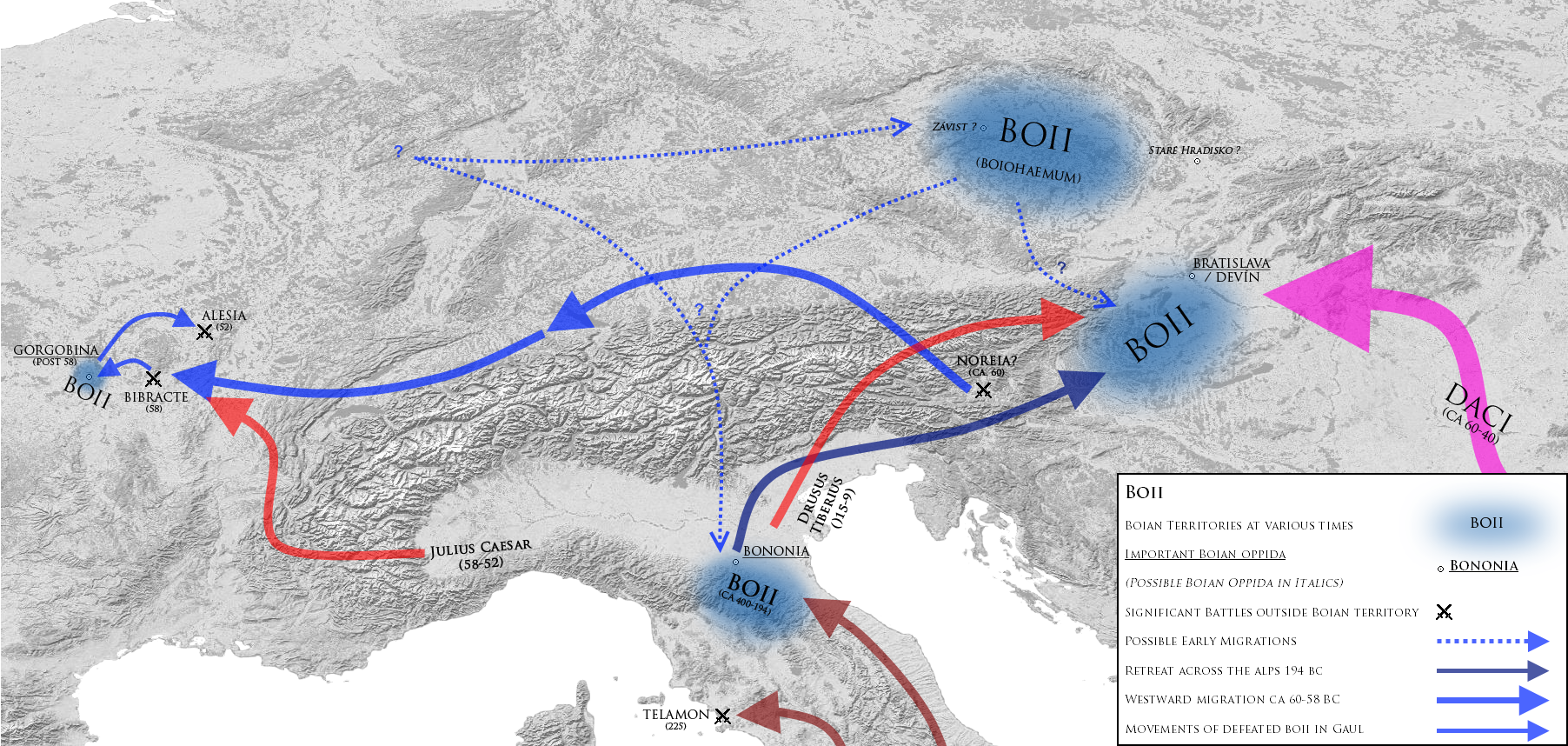
A depiction of the relative movements and conflicts of the Boii, including those with the Dacians and Julius Caesar.

From around 61 BC Burebista began to lead a series of campaigns of conquest against neighbouring tribes and clans. In 60/59 BC he defeated and conquered the Boii, who were led by Critasiros, and the Taurisci tribes dwelling in the Middle Danube, in modern Bohemia and Slovakia. The Boii had established a tribal presence in the areas now occupied by eastern Austria and south-western Slovakia and Hungary sometime in 75–50 BC. The Boii extended their influence eastward towards modern day Bratislava, Slovakia around 64–63 BC. It is these Boii tribes east of the Alps that came into conflict with the Dacians and were heavily defeated in 50–40 BC. These conquests were followed by the destruction of the Bastarnae peoples. Similarly, Burebista conquered a tribe that Strabo describes as living among the Illyrians and Thracians – most likely the Scordisci – while simultaneously conducting raids throughout Thrace, Roman Macedonia, and Illyria.

==== Capture of Greek cities ====
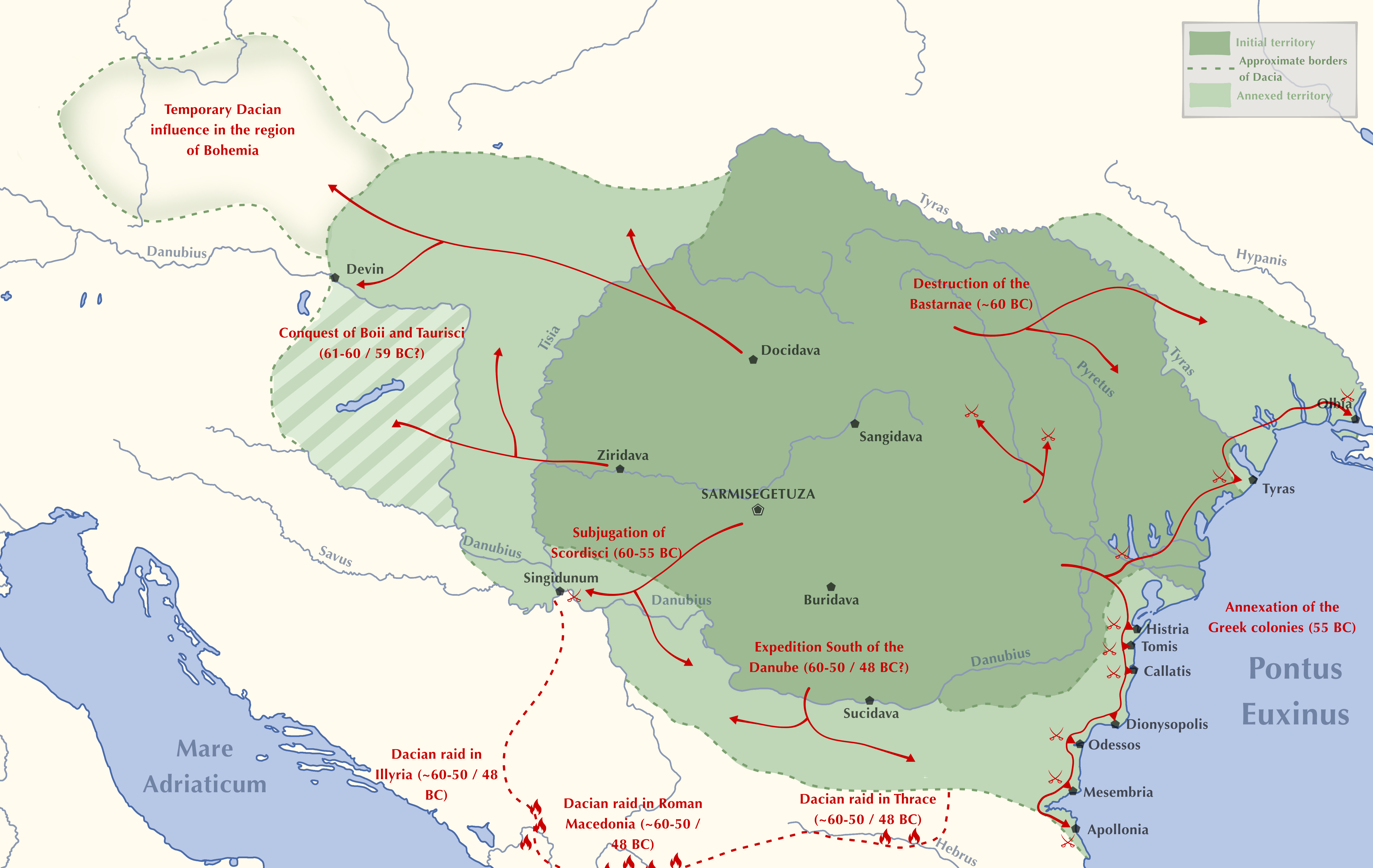
Burebista campaigns and territorial occupations.

Beginning around 55 BC Burebista annexed the Greek cities on the coast of the Black Sea, occupying the Greek fortresses from Olbia to Apollonia, as well as the Danubian plain all the way to the Balkans. These conquered cities were: Olbia, Tyras, Histria, Tomis, Callatis, Odessos, Messembria, Apollonia, and Dionysopolis. Dionysopolis, however, enjoyed good relations with Burebista. An inscription dating to 48 BC found in Dionysopolis and in honour of Akornion of Dionysopolis describes Akornion as the "first and greatest friend" of Burebista. Akornion was sent as an ambassador to Pompey to claim the title of "king of kings" for Burebista to be used within the Hellenistic kingdoms of the Balkans and the Near East.

=== Caesar's civil war ===
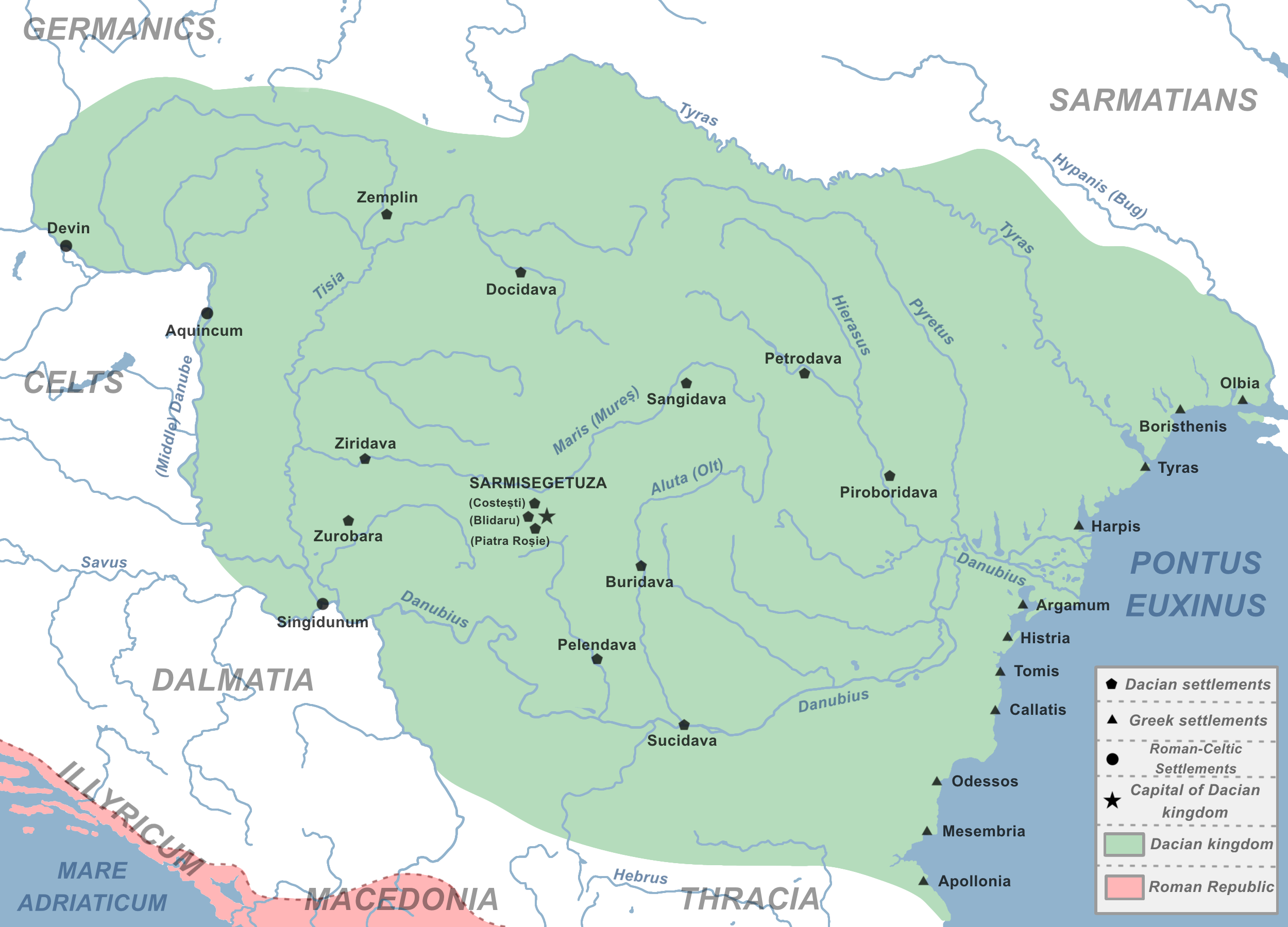
Dacian kingdom under Burebista and its neighbors

Burebista inevitably came into conflict with Rome. During the Roman civil war of 49–44 BC, Pompey gained the support of Burebista through Akornion of Dionysopolis. Pompey himself had recognized the might of Burebista and Dacia after their successful conquests against the Greek Black Sea cities. Caesar, however, ended any alliance between Pompey and Burebista at the Battle of Pharsalus. Caesar was also aware of the growing strength of the Dacians and had planned to lead an attack against Burebista. Burebista at this time had a force that may have numbered up to 200,000 men – though it is disputed whether this force was an actual military force or the number of ablebodied men within the kingdom. Regardless, Dacia was a formidable power that Caesar perceived as a threat to Rome. Caesar was never able to start his intended campaign because he was assassinated in 44 BC, with Burebista also being killed in a civil uprising in either 45 or 44 BC.

== Death ==
Burebista may have outlived Caesar for only a short time. In the same year Caesar was assassinated, Burebista was killed in a plot by the Dacian aristocracy, who saw a centralized state as leading to a reduction in their privileges. After his death, the Dacian kingdom dissolved, with the exception of the enclave around the Orăștie Mountains, while the rest became various smaller kingdoms. After Burebista's death, the kingdom was divided into four parts, to be ruled by the religious elite. By the time of Augustus Dacia had broken further into five parts.

== Dacia after Burebista ==
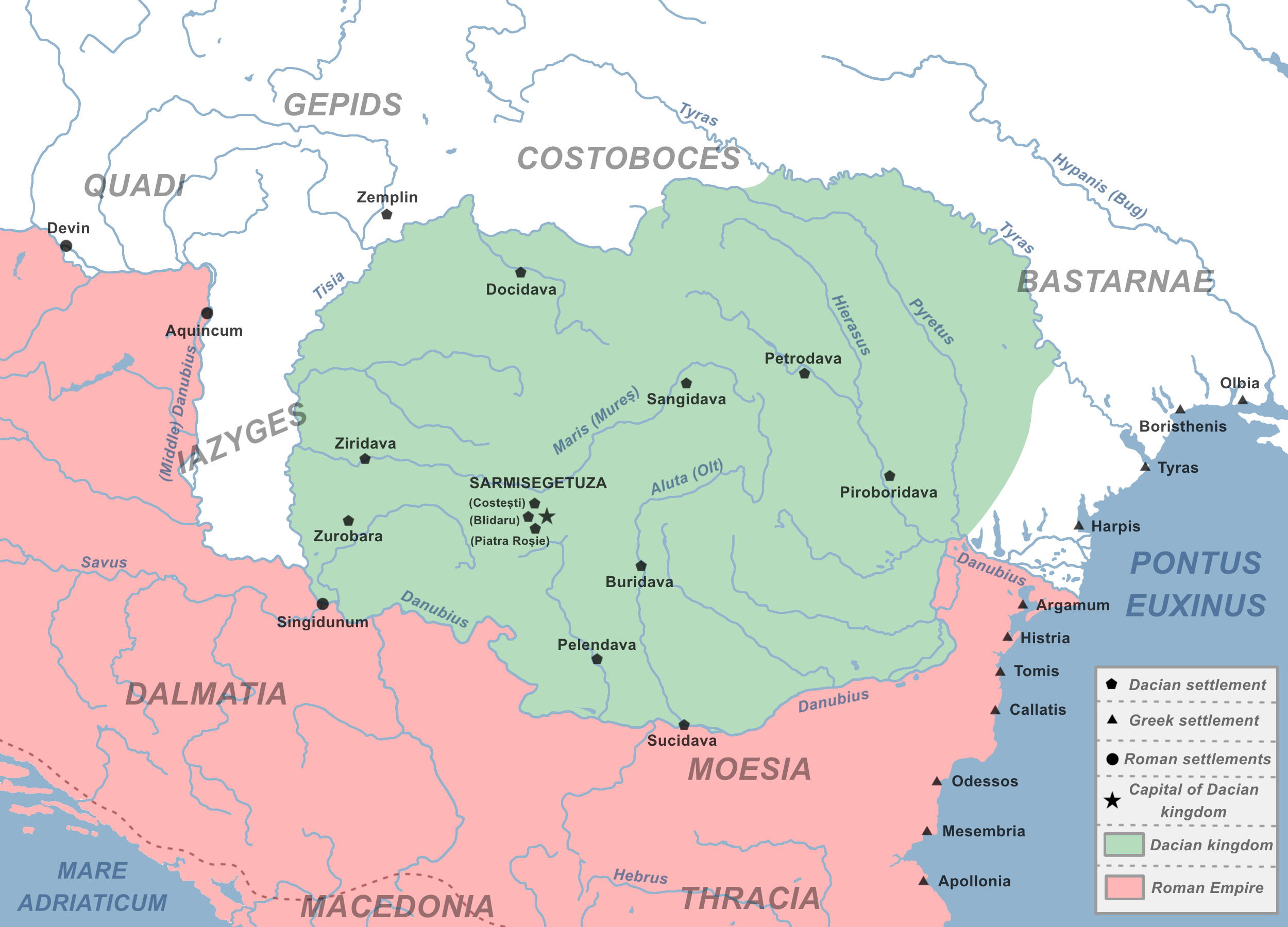
Dacian kingdom under Decebalus rule

In the time following Burebista's death, and between the rule of Tiberius and the rule of Domitian, Dacian activity was minimal. The Dacians were forced into a defensive state where their main activity was keeping the Romans out of Dacian territories. The regional factions that remained posed no substantial threat to the Roman empire, and Roman sources stop mentioning plans for Roman invasions during this time. Dacian power resurged during the reigns of Duras – who reigned 68–87 AD and peaked during the reign of Decebalus – who reigned from 85/87-106 AD. By this time the Dacian tribes had united once more, under the rule of Decebalus, and again posed a threat to Rome.

Decebalus' reign saw nearly constant warfare between the Dacians and Roman administrations south of the Danube. Around 85 AD raiding resumed in Moesia, Illyria, and Macedonia, culminating in the death of the Roman Governor of Moesia, Oppius Sabinius. In response, Domitian launched a campaign the same year under the command of the Praetorian Prefect Cornelius Fuscus. Domitian ignored Decebalus' offer of peace, an error which caused the Romans to suffer a disastrous defeat, losing not only Fuscus, but his forces and the Roman standards and war machines. A second expedition was launched in 88 AD, this time under the command of Tettius Julianus. This second campaign was somewhat victorious as both sides suffered massive casualties in battle. However, revolts and defections forced Domitian to negotiate a hasty peace treaty with Decebalus in 89 AD. This peace had benefits and costs to both sides: Rome had to pay financial tributes and provide technological assistance to Dacia; in exchange, Dacia effectively became a client kingdom of Rome, acting as a bulkhead for the empire, separating Rome from other warring tribes.

This peace lasted for around a decade, until Trajan became emperor in 98 AD. Immediately upon becoming emperor, Trajan travelled to the frontier stretching from Pannonia to Moesia, where he worked to strengthen the fortifications. In 101–102 AD Trajan assembled an army of up to 150,000 men to send against Decebalus' 50,000. The army was split into two and entered into Dacian territory at two points along the frontier. The columns met at Tibiscum and marched together towards Sarmizegetusa. At Tapae they encountered and defeated the Dacian force. This in turn forced Decebalus to sue for peace. Trajan agreed but imposed harsh terms against the Dacians. Decebalus failed to meet the terms of the peace, and in 105 Trajan launched a second campaign against him. By 106 Trajan had completed the conquest of Dacia, ending its existence as an independent kingdom.

== Legacy ==
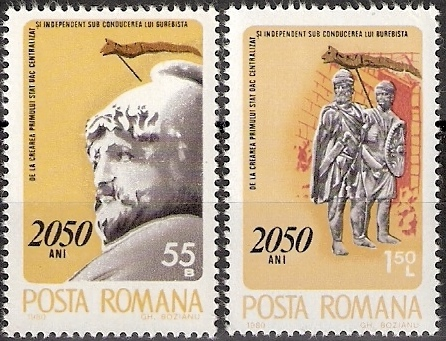
1980 stamp from Romania, labeled "2050 years from the creation of the first centralized and independent Dacian state under the leadership of Burebista"

The image of fearless and noble Dacians as predecessors to modern Romanians was augmented and impressed by nationalist movements in the late 1920s and 1930s. On one hand, the Dacians were often used in discourses claiming an ethnically pure origin for the Romanian people. At the same time, however, the Romans were preferred instead when the objective was portraying Romania as a civilized and cosmopolitan nation.

In the 1960s statues were erected for the two leaders of the Dacian kingdom, Burebista and Decebalus. These came as part of a gradual process of disassociating Socialist Romania from the Soviet Union. The statues depict the kings as freedom fighters, and nationwide celebrations were held for the anniversaries of ancient battles. Additionally, two government-funded film productions were created as part of this same process. Both films focus on the history of Dacia in the 1st and 2nd century AD and the exploits of Decebalus, while Burebista is almost ignored.

Starting in the 1970s, the Nicolae Ceaușescu regime used nationalistic and questionable interpretations of ancient history (Protochronism) to legitimize its rule. In 1980 the Romanian government declared a celebration of the 2,050th anniversary of the founding of the "unitary and centralized" Dacian state of Burebista, drawing comparisons with Ceaușescu's Romania and claiming an uninterrupted existence of the state from Burebista to Ceaușescu. The epic movie Burebista (1980) based on the king's life was released the same year, and celebrated him as the Romanian pater patriae. This commemoration led the press to note "similarities" between Burebista and Ceaușescu, and even professional historians such as Ion Horațiu Crișan spoke about Burebista in ways similar to how party activists spoke about Ceaușescu.

Burebista and his descendants are considered by Romanian nationalists to be the true ancestors of their nation. Historian László Kürti describes this as an imaginary history, and notes that during the regime of Ceaușescu this alternate history was used as a political device. In 1984 the brother of President Ceaușescu, Ilie Ceaușescu, published a treatise stating that; "[t]he archaeological evidence conclusively shows the uninterrupted ethnic, political, and military continuity of the Romanians." Kürti notes that similar political devices are used by Hungarians to promote their claim to the same Transylvanian region, part of Romania.

== See also ==
- Decree of Dionysopolis
- Argedava
- Argidava
- List of Dacian kings
