= Decree of Dionysopolis =

Decree written by citizens of Dionysupolis

The Decree of Dionysopolis was written around 48 BC by the citizens of Dionysopolis (today's Balchik, on the Black Sea coast of Bulgaria) to Akornion, who traveled far away in a diplomatic mission to meet somebody's father in Argedauon. The decree, a fragmentary marble inscription, is located in the National Historical Museum in Sofia.

== Inscription ==
The decree mentions a Dacian town named Argedauon (Ancient Greek: Αργεδαυον), potentially Argidava or Argedava.

The stone is damaged and name was read differently by various editors and scholars:

- [ἐπορεύθη εἰς] Ἀργέδα[υι]ον by Wilhelm Dittenberger (1898)
- [πέμψας?] Αρ[γ]έδα[ρ]ον by Ernst Kalinka (1905)
- [...εἰ]ς Ἀργέδαυον by Wilhelm Dittenberger and Friedrich Hiller (1917), noting that the υ is an uncertain reading
- Ἀργέδαβον by Vasile Pârvan (1923)

The inscription also refers to the Dacian king Burebista, and one interpretation is that Akornion was his chief adviser (Ancient Greek: πρῶτοσφίλος, literally "first friend") in Dionysopolis. Other sources indicate that Akornion was sent as an ambassador of Burebista to Pompey, to discuss an alliance against Julius Caesar.

This leads to the assumption that the mentioned Argedava was Burebista's capital of the Dacian kingdom. This source does not mention the location of Argedava and historians opinions are split in two groups.

One school of thought, led by historians Constantin Daicoviciu and Hadrian Daicoviciu, assume the inscription talks about Argidava and place the potential capital of Burebista at Vărădia, Caraș-Severin County, Romania. The forms Argidava and Arcidava found in other ancient sources like Ptolemy's Geographia (c. 150 AD) and Tabula Peutingeriana (2nd century AD), clearly place a Dacian town with those names at this geographical location. The site is also close to Sarmizegetusa, a later Dacian capital.

Others, led by historian Vasile Pârvan and professor Radu Vulpe, place Argedava at Popeşti, a district in the town of Mihăilești, Giurgiu County, Romania. Arguments include the name connection with the Argeş River, geographical position on a potential road to Dionysopolis which Akornion followed, and the size of the archaeological discovery at Popeşti that hints to a royal palace. However, no other sources seem to name the dava discovered at Popeşti, so no exact assumptions can be made about its Dacian name.

It is also possible for the two different davae to be just homonyms.

The marble inscription is damaged in many areas, including right before the word "Argedauon", and it is possible the original word could have been "Sargedauon" (Ancient Greek: Σαργεδαυον) or "Zargedauon". This form could potentially be linked to "Zargidaua" mentioned by Ptolemy at a different geographical location. They could also simply be homonyms.

== See also ==
- Dacia
- List of ancient cities in Thrace and Dacia
