= Argedava =

Dacian fortified settlement

- Dacian fortress of Popești, Argedauon, Sargedava, Sargedauon, Zargedava, Zargedauon
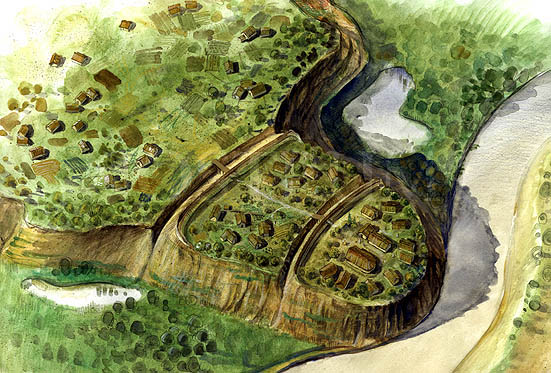
- Illustration, potentially Burebista's capital

- Location within Romania
- 44.3127°N 25.9648°E
- Location: Popești, Giurgiu, Romania

Argedava (Argedauon, Sargedava, Sargedauon, Zargedava, Zargedauon, Ancient Greek: Αργεδαυον, Σαργεδαυον) was potentially an important Dacian town mentioned in the Decree of Dionysopolis (48 BC), and maybe located at Popești, a district in the town of Mihăilești, Giurgiu County, Muntenia, Romania.

== Decree of Dionysopolis ==
The decree, a fragmentary marble inscription, is located in the National Museum in Sofia. It was written by the citizens of Dionysopolis to Akornion, who is said in the text to have met somebody's father in Argedauon. In a later section, the inscription also refers to the Dacian king Burebista and mentions that Akornion was his chief adviser (Ancient Greek: πρῶτοσφίλος, literally "first friend"). According to the text, Akornion was also sent as an ambassador of Burebista to Pompey.

This has led to the assumption that the mentioned Argedava was Burebista's capital of the Dacian kingdom. Regarding the location of Argedava and historians opinions are split in two groups. One school of thought, led by historians Constantin Daicoviciu and Hadrian Daicoviciu, assumes that the inscription talks about Argidava and place the potential capital of Burebista at Vărădia, Caraș-Severin County, Romania. The forms Argidava and Arcidava found in other ancient sources like Ptolemy's Geographia (c. 150 AD) and Tabula Peutingeriana (2nd century AD), clearly place a town with those names at this geographical location. The site is also close to Sarmizegetusa, a later Dacian capital. Others, led by historian Vasile Pârvan and Radu Vulpe place Argedava at Popești, Giurgiu. Arguments include the name connection with the river Argeș, geographical position on a potential road to Dionysopolis which Akornion followed, and most importantly the size of the archaeological discovery at Popești that hints to a royal palace. However no other sources seem to name the dava discovered at Popești, so no exact assumptions can be made about its Dacian name. It is possible that the two different davae are homonyms.

However, the connection between the place name Argedava and the later mention of Burebista in the inscription is by no means certain. Instead of a Dacian residence, the place name Argedava could also refer to any other place that Akornion visited at some point in his life. There was indeed an ancient place called Arcidava in the immediate vicinity of Dionysopolis. In this case, all speculations on a Dacian residence with this name would be obsolete.

Furthermore, the marble inscription is damaged in many areas, including right before the word Argedauon, and it is possible the original word could have been Sargedauon (Ancient Greek: Σαργεδαυον) or Zargedauon. This form could be linked to Zargidaua mentioned by Ptolemy at a different geographical location. Or, they could be homonyms.

== Literary reference ==
- Mihai Eminescu made a reference to Sarmiszegetuza in the "Third Letter Poem" to the hills of Argedava when he described the Battle at the Rovine from 17 May 1395.

== See also ==
- Argidava
- Dacia
- List of ancient cities in Thrace and Dacia
- Dacian davae

== Sources ==
- Brodersen, Kai (2020). Dacia felix: Das antike Rumänien im Brennpunkt der Kulturen. Darmstadt: wbg. ISBN 978-3-8053-5059-4.
- Crișan, Ion Horațiu (1978). Burebista and His Time. Volume 20 of Bibliotheca historica Romaniae: Monographies. Bucharest: Editura Academiei Republicii Socialiste România.
- Daicoviciu, Hadrian (1972). Dacii. Bucharest: Editura Enciclopedica Româna.
- Mihailov, Georgi (1970). Inscriptiones graecae in Bulgaria repertae (in Latin and Greek). Vol. 1 (2nd ed.). Sofia: In aedibus typographicis Academiae Litterarum Bulgaricae.
- Oltean, Ioana Adina (2007). Dacia: landscape, colonisation and romanisation. Routledge. ISBN 978-0-415-41252-0.
- Olteanu, Sorin. "Linguae Thraco-Daco-Moesorum – Toponyms Section". Linguae Thraco-Daco-Moesorum (in Romanian and English). Archived from the original on 16 July 2011.
