= Castra Arcidava =

Fort in the Roman province of Dacia

Arcidava
- Castra of Vărădia; Argidava, Arcidaba, Arghidava
- Location within Romania
- 45.079158°N 21.552013°E
- Location: Vărădia, Caraș-Severin, Romania

History
- Built: Trajan

Site notes
- Elevation: 95 m (312 ft)
- Excavation dates: 1901, 1930, 1985 - 1990, 1997 - 2002
- Archaeologists: Felix Milleker
- Condition: Ruined

Castra Arcidava was a fort in the Roman province of Dacia in the area of the town of Arcidava (now Vărădia, Romania) in the 2nd and 3rd centuries AD.

It was 17 km away from Ponte Fluvii fort (Grebenac), Serbia and located at the junction of the Lederata/Viminacium-Tibiscum military road with the Roman road from Almăj.

The fort is on the road leading to Greoni, in the place called “Rovina” and was linked by a corridor to a watchtower on the Chilii Hill.

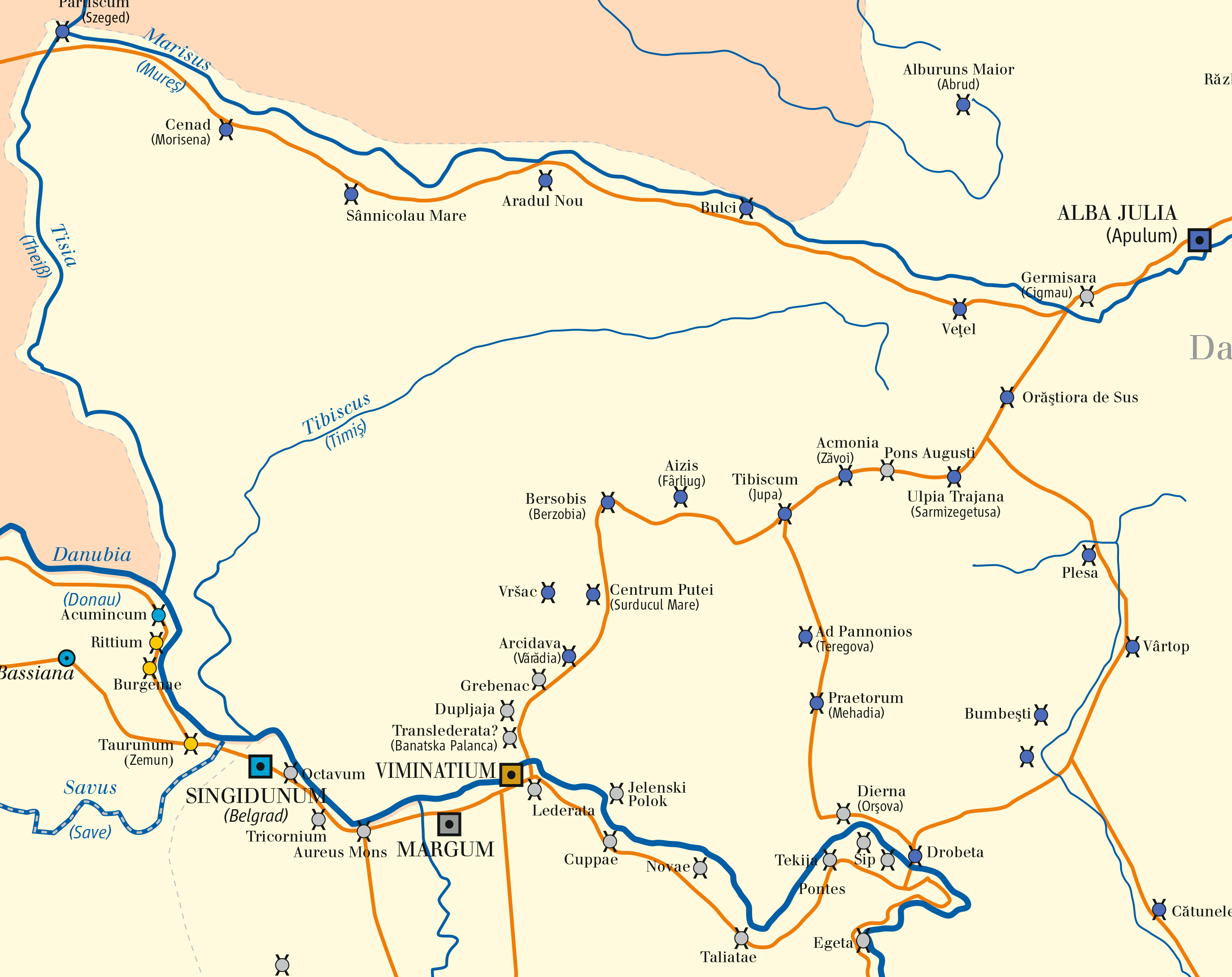
Western Dacia forts

== See also ==
- List of castra
