= Argidava =

Dacian fortress town, located in Caraș-Severin county, Romania

- Argidaua, Arcidava, Arcidaua, Argedava, Argedauon, Argedabon, Sargedava, Sargedauon, Zargedava, Zargedauon
- Arcidava on the Roman Dacia map.

- Location within Romania
- 45.08°N 21.55°E
- Cultures: Albocense
- Location: Poiana Flămânda, Vărădia, Caraș-Severin County, Romania

Site notes
- Condition: Ruined

Monument istoric
- Reference no.: CS-I-s-B-10894

UNESCO World Heritage Site
- Part of: Frontiers of the Roman Empire – Dacia
- Criteria: Cultural: ii, iii, iv
- Reference: 1718-002
- Inscription: 2024 (46th Session)

Argidava (Argidaua, Arcidava, Arcidaua, Argedava, Argedauon, Argedabon, Sargedava, Sargedauon, Zargedava, Zargedauon, Ancient Greek: Ἀργίδαυα, Αργεδαυον, Αργεδαβον, Σαργεδαυον) was a Dacian fortress town close to the Danube, inhabited and governed by the Albocense. Located in today's Vărădia, Caraș-Severin County, Romania.

After the Roman conquest of Dacia, it became a military and a civilian center, with a castrum (Roman fort) (see Castra Arcidava) built in the area. The fort was used to monitor the shores of the Danube.

== Ancient sources ==
The oldest found potential reference to Argidava is in the form Argedauon or Argedabon (Ancient Greek: Αργεδαυον, Αργεδαβον), written in stone, in the Decree of Dionysopolis (48 BC). However, it is unclear as to whether this refers to Argidava or a distinct town Argedava.

=== Decree of Dionysopolis ===
The decree, a fragmentary marble inscription, is located in the National Museum in Sofia. It was written by the citizens of Dionysopolis to Akornion, who is said in the text to have met somebody's father in Argedauon. In a later section, the inscription also refers to the Dacian king Burebista and mentions that Akornion was his chief adviser (Ancient Greek: πρῶτοσφίλος, literally "first friend"). According to the text, Akornion was also sent as an ambassador of Burebista to Pompey.

This has led to the assumption that the mentioned Argedava was Burebista's capital of the Dacian kingdom. Regarding the location of Argedava and historians opinions are split in two groups. One school of thought, led by historians Constantin Daicoviciu and Hadrian Daicoviciu, assumes that the inscription talks about Argidava and place the potential capital of Burebista at Vărădia, Caraș-Severin County, Romania. The forms Argidava and Arcidava found in other ancient sources like Ptolemy's Geographia (c. 150 AD) and Tabula Peutingeriana (2nd century AD), clearly place a town with those names at this geographical location. The site is also close to Sarmizegetusa, a later Dacian capital. Others, led by historian Vasile Pârvan and Radu Vulpe place Argedava at Popești, Giurgiu. Arguments include the name connection with the river Argeș, geographical position on a potential road to Dionysopolis which Akornion followed, and most importantly the size of the archaeological discovery at Popești that hints to a royal palace. However no other sources seem to name the dava discovered at Popești, so no exact assumptions can be made about its Dacian name. It is possible that the two different davae are homonyms.

However, the connection between the place name Argedava and the later mention of Burebista in the inscription is by no means certain. Instead of a Dacian residence, the place name Argedava could also refer to any other place that Akornion visited at some point in his life. There was indeed an ancient place called Arcidava in the immediate vicinity of Dionysopolis. In this case, all speculations on a Dacian residence with this name would be obsolete.

Furthermore, the marble inscription is damaged in many areas, including right before the word Argedauon, and it is possible the original word could have been Sargedauon (Ancient Greek: Σαργεδαυον) or Zargedauon. This form could be linked to Zargidaua mentioned by Ptolemy at a different geographical location. Or, they could be homonyms.

=== Ptolemy's Geographia ===
Argidava is mentioned in Ptolemy's Geographia (c. 150 AD) in the form Argidaua (Ancient Greek: Ἀργίδαυα) as an important Dacian town, at latitude 46° 30' N and longitude 45° 15' E (note that he used a different meridian and some of his calculations were off).

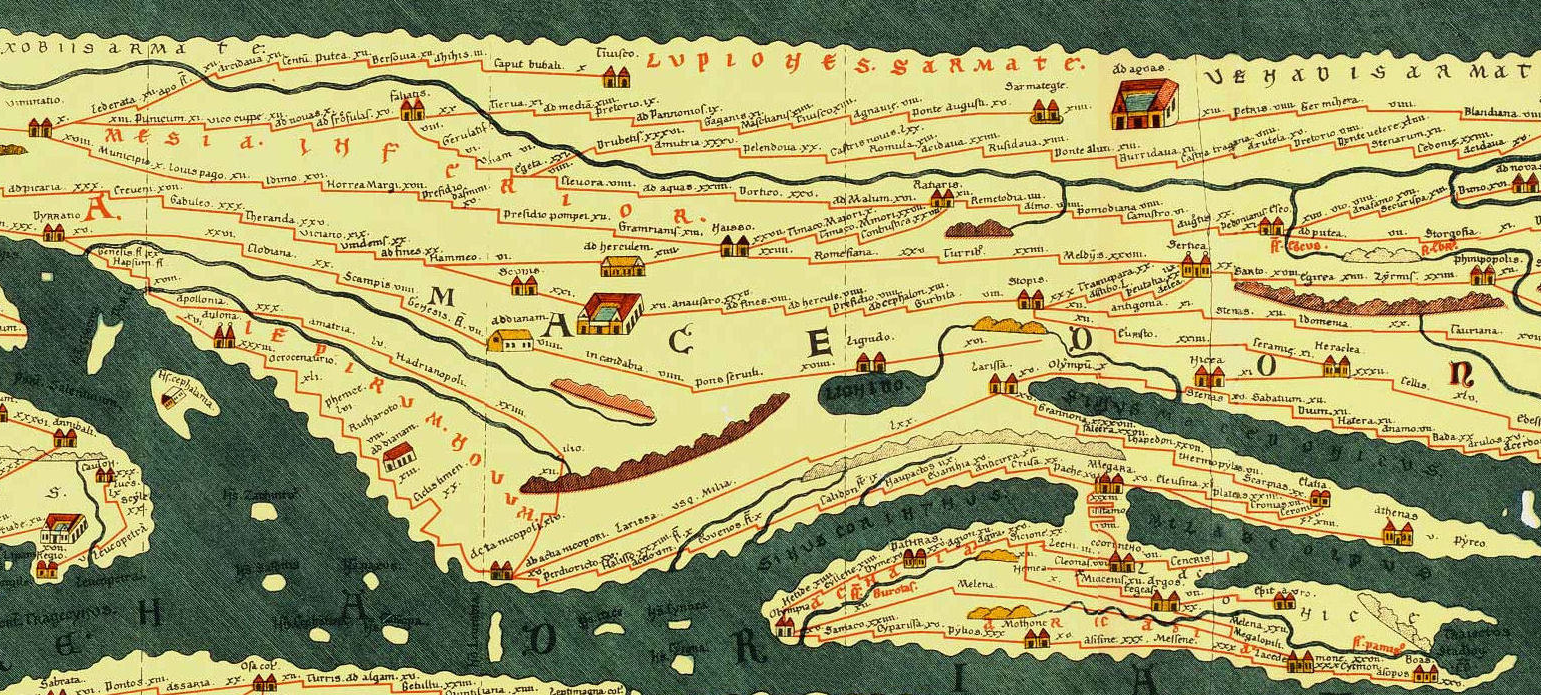
Arcidaua on Tabula Peutingeriana (top upper left corner)

=== Tabula Peutingeriana ===
Argidava is also depicted in the Tabula Peutingeriana (2nd century AD) in the form Arcidaua, on a Roman road network, between Apo Fl. and Centum Putea. The location corresponds to the one mentioned by Ptolemy and the different form is most likely caused by the G/C graphical confusion commonly found in Latin documents.

== See also ==
- Argedava
- Dacia
- Roman Dacia
- List of ancient cities in Thrace and Dacia
- Dacian davae
