= Akornion =

Ancient Greek political advisor

Akornion was an important citizen of the Ionian Greek colony of Dionysopolis (today's Balchik, on the Black Sea coast of Bulgaria).

He is mentioned in the Decree of Dionysopolis, written around 48 BC by the citizens of the polis. The decree mentions that Akornion was sent far away in a diplomatic mission to meet somebody's father in Argedauon, potentially the Dacian towns of Argidava or Argedava. The decree, a fragmentary marble inscription, is located in the National Historical Museum in Sofia, Bulgaria.

The inscription also refers to the Dacian king Burebista, and one interpretation is that Akornion was his chief adviser (Ancient Greek: πρῶτοσφίλος, literally "first friend") in Dionysopolis. Other sources indicate that Akornion was sent as an ambassador of Burebista to Pompey, to discuss an alliance against Julius Caesar.

== See also ==
- Dionysopolis
- Burebista
- Dacia
