= Danube–Bucharest Canal =

Canal project in Romania

Coordinates: 44.2947°N 26.02494°E

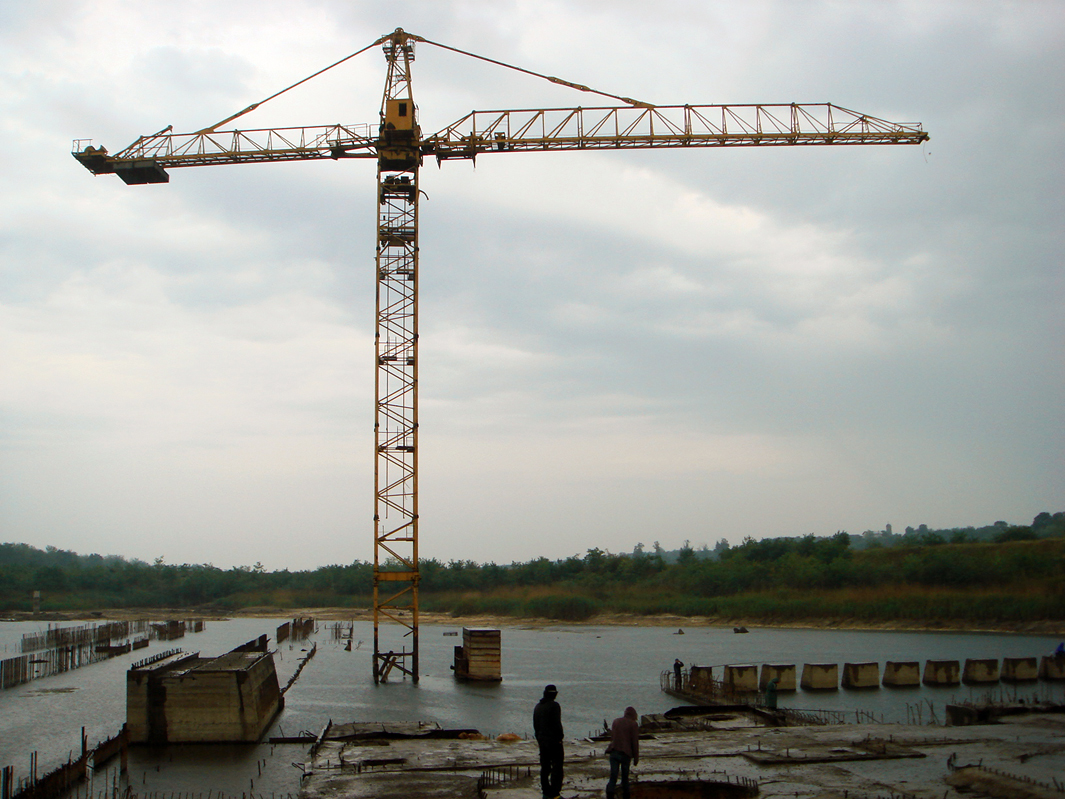
Copăceni lock

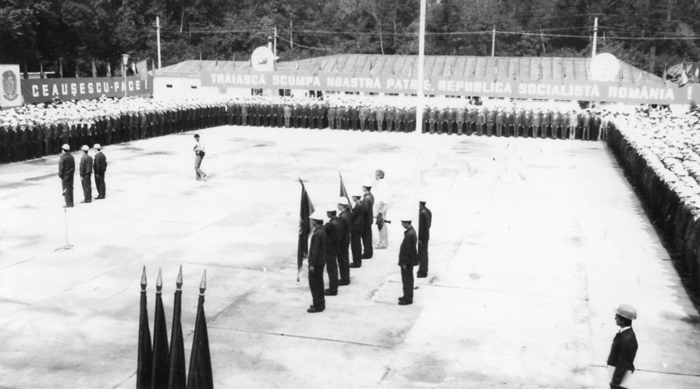
Opening ceremony of the Building-Site, Danube-Bucharest Canal, August 5, 1986

The Danube–Bucharest Canal is a 73-kilometre (45 mi) long canal project that is planned to link Bucharest, Romania to the Danube via the Argeș River, and ultimately create direct access to the Black Sea via the existing Danube–Black Sea Canal. The total capacity of the waterway will be 24 million tons/year. The minimum depth is of 4.5 metres and the ships will rise 67 metres over their voyage through six locks and 73km.

== History ==
The earliest plans, made by engineer Nicolae Cucu in 1880, sought to link Bucharest to the Danube at Oltenița.

In 1927, a study by Alexandru Davidescu was published at the Polytechnic School. Two years later, the Romanian parliament passed Law no. 2749 on the building of the Argeș–Bucharest–Danube Canal and of a port in Bucharest; the law was published in Monitorul Oficial in August 1929. However, the world recession of the early 1930s prevented the government from investing large amounts of money in such projects. Various studies were published, but as World War II began, they were ignored.

New plans were made in 1982, the main goal being the regularization of the Argeș River, which flooded in 1970. Communist leader Nicolae Ceaușescu also wanted to have a direct link to Northern Europe, as Rhine-Main-Danube Canal was also built then. The building of the canal began in 1986, the project was supposed to have five locks and four hydroelectric plants (the only one that is currently working is the one at Mihăilești). The final project was supposed to generate 62 GWh/year.

In February 1990, the building of the canal was stopped, although it was 60% completed. Currently, just the dam at Mihăilești and the micro-hydro plant are functional.

In 1997, Traian Băsescu, who was Minister of Transport at the time, announced that the finalizing of the canal would require about US$ 400 million and take four years, but the financing was not found at the time.

In 2005, Adriean Videanu, the mayor of Bucharest announced that he intends to finish the work.

As of 2013, a joint Romanian-EU project planned to complete the canal from 2014 to 2020 using national and Cohesion funds as part of the EU strategy for the Danube Region.

In May 2024 the request for issuing the Environmental Agreement was submitted to the Ministry of the Environment.
