= Dionysopolis =

Dionysopolis (Ancient Greek: Διονυσόπολις) may refer to:

- Dionysupolis, a city in ancient Thrace, now in Bulgaria (a Black Sea coastal town named Balchik)
- Dionysiopolis, a city in ancient Phrygia, now in Turkey
- Dionysopolis Indiae, a city in ancient India inter Gangem, now in Afghanistan
