= Beška =

Beška Бешка (Serbian)
- Village (Selo)
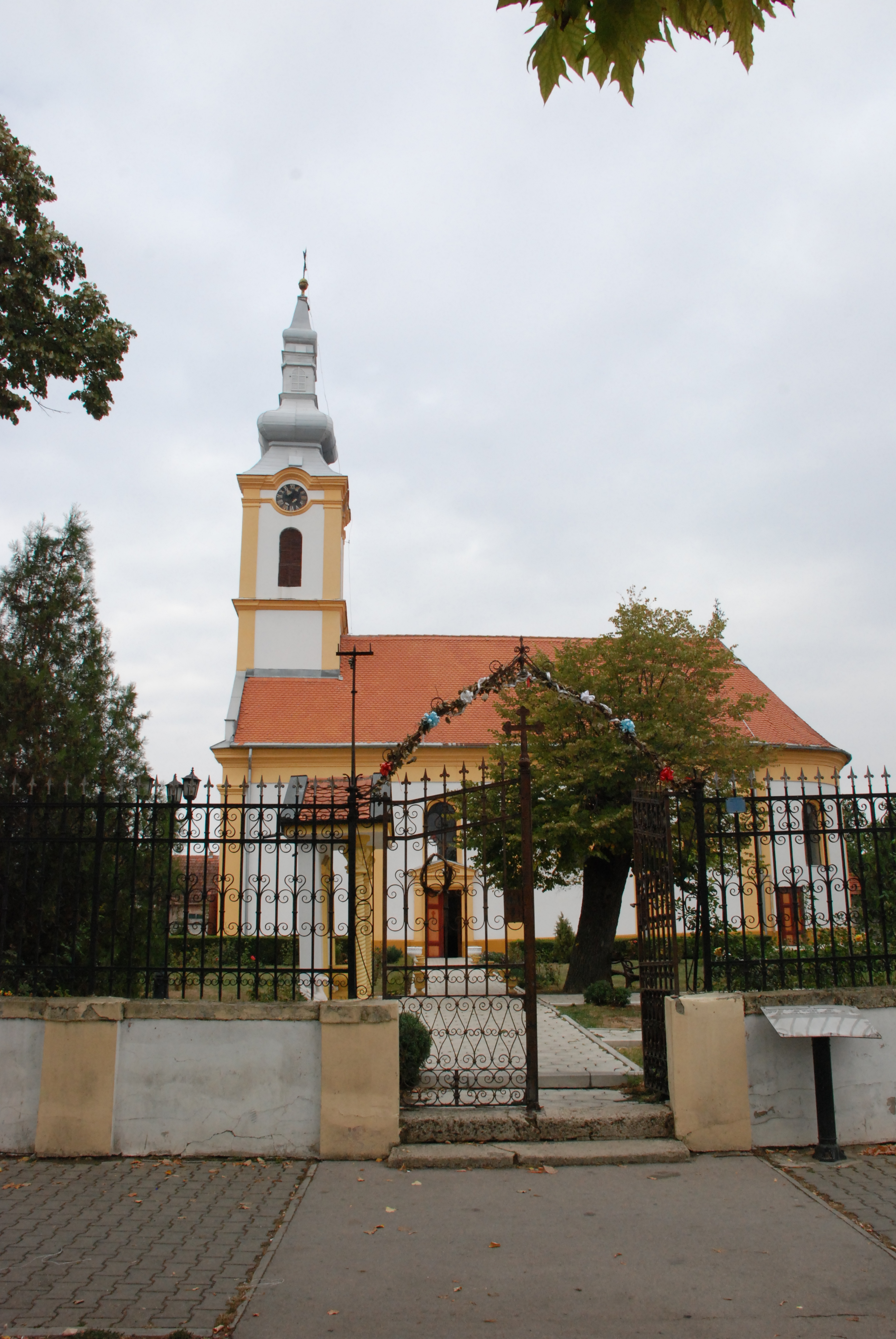
- The Orthodox church

- Location within Vojvodina Location within Serbia Location within Europe
- Coordinates: 45°08′N 20°04′E
- Country: Serbia
- Province: Vojvodina
- Region: Syrmia
- District: Srem
- Municipality: Inđija

Population (2002)
  - Total: 6,239
- Time zone: UTC+1 (CET)
  - Summer (DST): UTC+2 (CEST)

Beška (Serbian Cyrillic: Бешка) is a village in Serbia. It is situated in the Autonomous Province of Vojvodina, in the region of Syrmia (Syrmia District), in Inđija municipality. The village has a Serb ethnic majority and a population numbering 6,239 people (2002 census).

== History and Archeology ==
Roman tombs with rich decorative paintings dating back to the third or the fourth century were discovered in Beška.

It was first mentioned in 1564. During Ottoman rule (16th-17th century) the village of Beška was populated by Serbs. During Habsburg rule, ethnic Germans settled there. Following World War II in Yugoslavia, the German population fled the village, while new inhabitants mostly from Croatia settled in the village in place of the Germans.

During the Holocaust, an estimated 20 men from Beška worked in Auschwitz concentration camp, leading German newspaper Der Spiegel to speculate that "Beška could very well have been the village with the highest concentration of Auschwitz personnel." One guard who served in the watch tower told the paper, "Half of our village was in the SS and everyone had said something about it at home."

The archeological site of Kalakača includes findings of Early Bosut culture with traits of Gava culture dating to the 9th century BC. The site is part of the Cultural Heritage of Serbia list, inscribed in 1995.

== Demographics ==
=== Ethnic groups ===
- 4,766 (76.39%) Serbs
- 506 (8.11%) Croats
- 208 (3.33%) Yugoslavs
- 137 (2.20%) Hungarians
- 89 (1.43%) Romani
- others.

=== Historical population ===
- 1961: 5,378
- 1971: 6,351
- 1981: 6,377
- 1991: 6,166
- 2002: 6,239

== Gallery ==
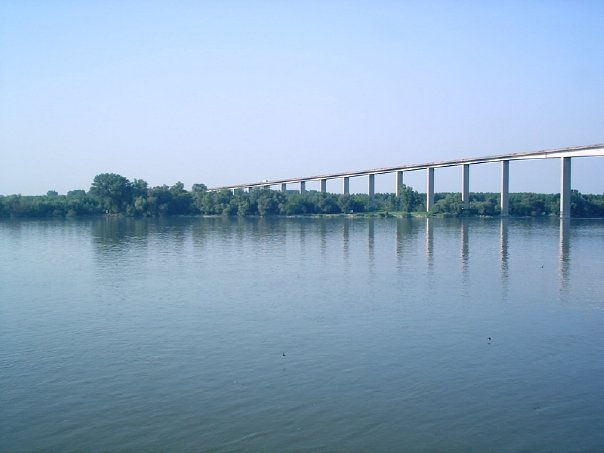
Beška bridge

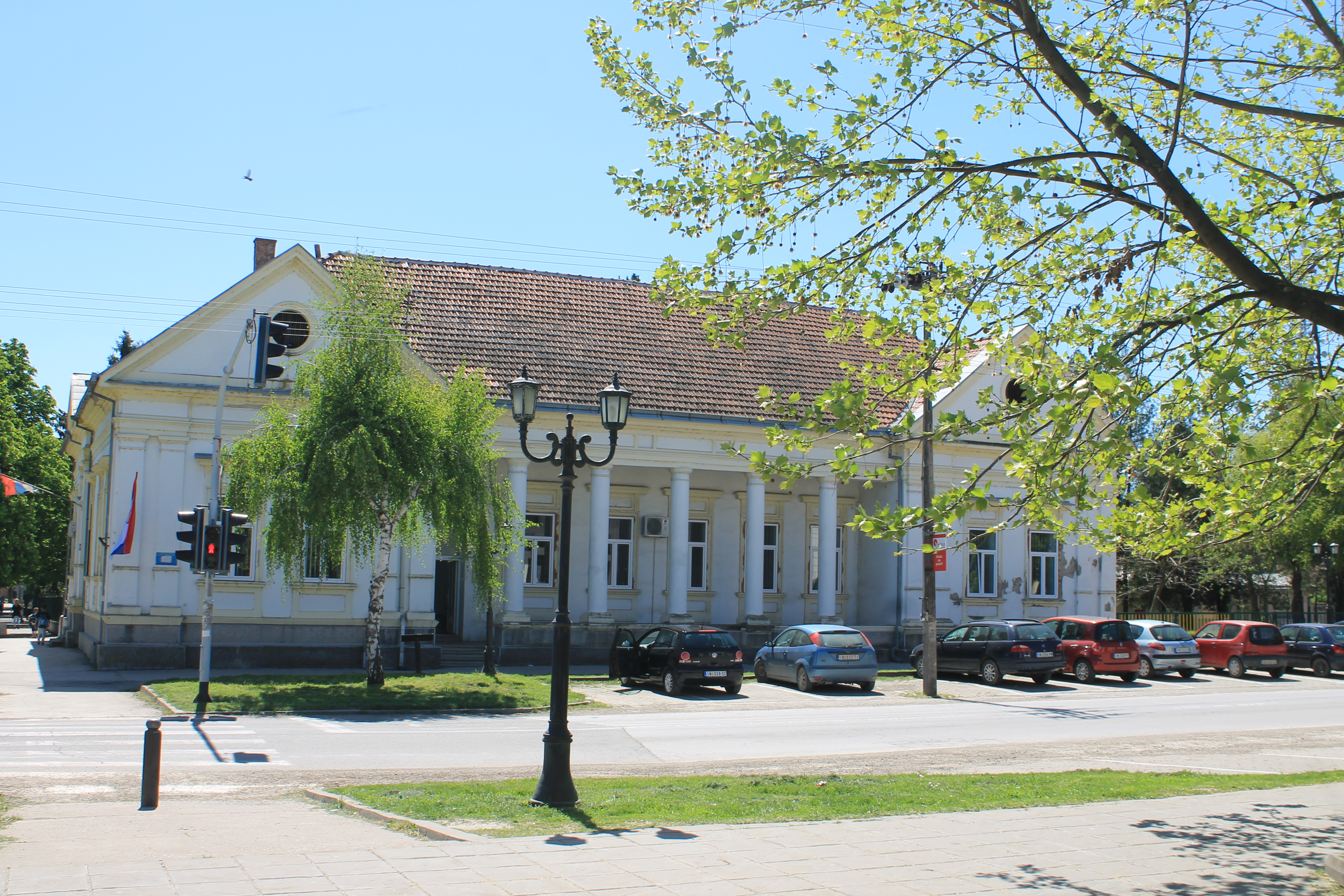
Village center

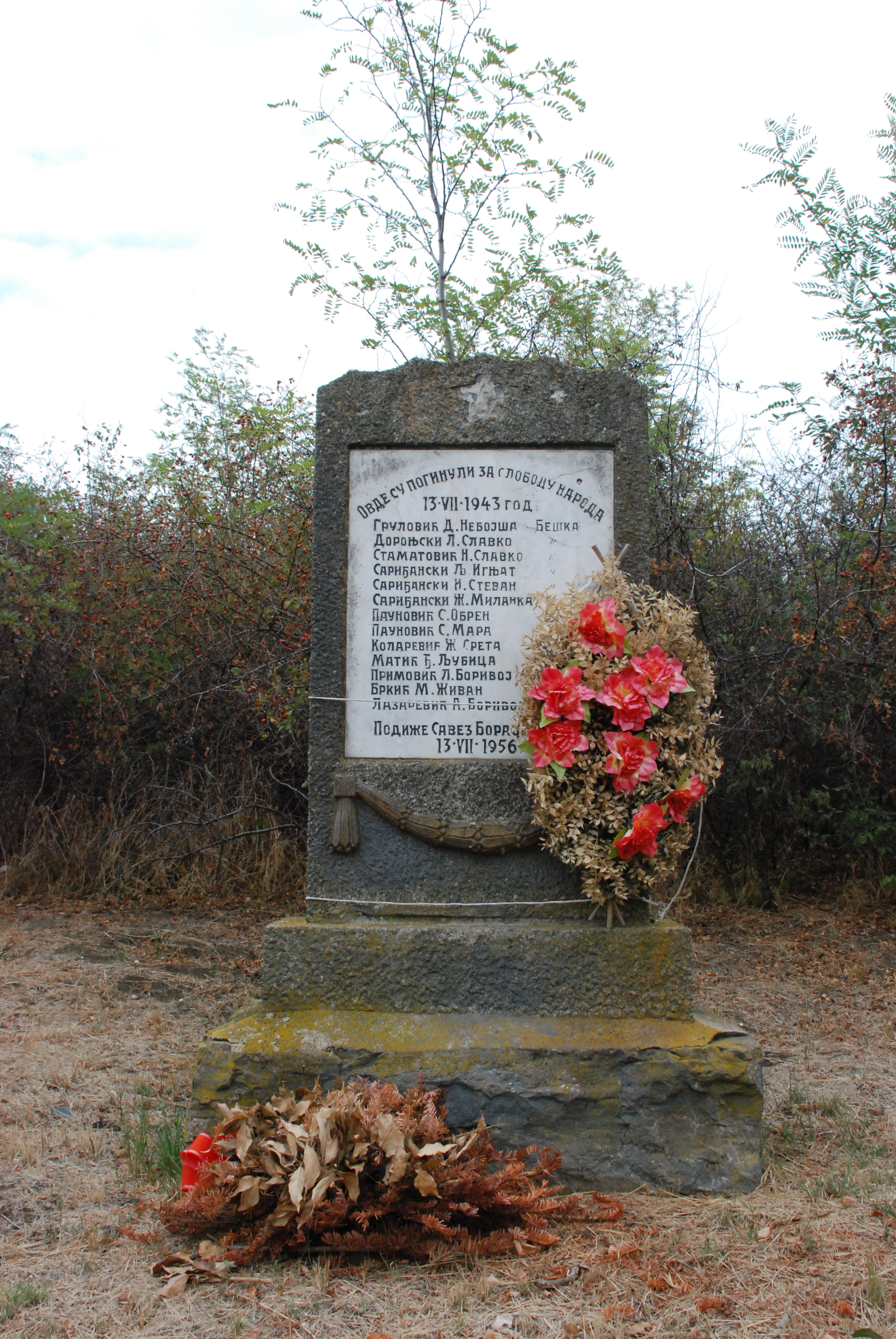
Monument to citizens killed in WW2

== See also ==
- List of places in Serbia
- List of cities, towns and villages in Vojvodina
