= Bosut-Basarabi complex =

The Bosut-Basarabi complex is a common name for two related prehistoric Iron Age cultures in Southeastern Europe:

- The Bosut culture
- The Basarabi culture
