= Mihăilești =

- Town
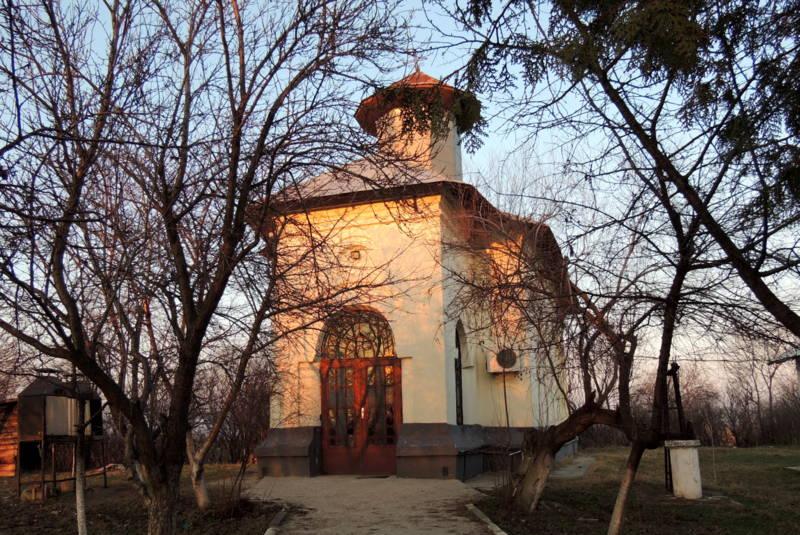
- Assumption church in Novaci

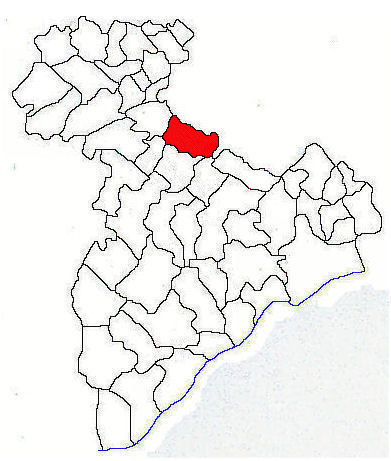
- Location in Giurgiu County

- Location in Romania
- Coordinates: 44°19′26″N 25°54′25″E
- Country: Romania
- County: Giurgiu

Government
  - Mayor (2024–2028): Adrian-Gabriel Gâjâilă (PNL)
- Area: 68.43 km^{2} (26.42 sq mi)
- Elevation: 90 m (300 ft)
- Population (2021-12-01): 7,760
  - Density: 113/km^{2} (294/sq mi)
- Time zone: UTC+02:00 (EET)
  - Summer (DST): UTC+03:00 (EEST)
- Postal code: 085200
- Area code: +(40) 246
- Vehicle reg.: GR
- Website: primariamihailesti.ro

Mihăilești is a town located in Giurgiu County, Muntenia, Romania. It administers three villages: Drăgănescu, Novaci, and Popești. It officially became a town in 1989, as a result of the Romanian rural systematization program.

The town stands beside the river Argeș, which at this point is dammed, forming a lake about 5 kilometres (3.1 miles) long. The lake was created as part of the Danube–Bucharest Canal project and feeds a hydro-electric plant.

Historical population
Year	Pop.	±%
1992	7,341	—
2002	7,161	−2.5%
2011	7,492	+4.6%
2021	7,760	+3.6%
Source: Census data

At the 2021 census, Mihăilești had a population of 7,760; of those, 84.34% were Romanians and 2.18% Roma.

== Argedava ==
Popești village is the location of an important archeological discovery: a large Dacian settlement believed by some historians such as Vasile Pârvan and Radu Vulpe to be the Argedava mentioned in the Decree of Dionysopolis. This ancient source links Argedava with the Dacian king Burebista, and it is believed to be his court or capital.
