= Bosut culture =

Thracian archaeological culture

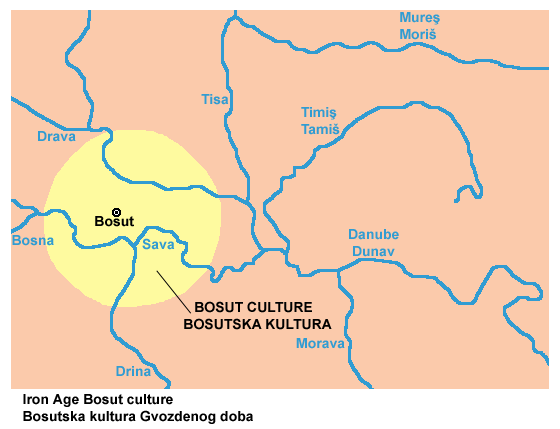
Map of the territorial extent of the Bosut culture

Bosut culture (Serbian: Bosutska kultura / Босутска култура or Bosutska grupa / Босутска група) is a name of a prehistoric Iron Age culture, which was named after the Bosut Gradina archaeological site in Serbia. It is sometimes grouped with related Basarabi culture into Bosut-Basarabi complex. There are different views about ethnic identity of the people of Bosut culture; according to one view, they were Triballi, while according to another view, they were Daco-Getae. The culture flourished in the first half of the 1st millennium BC, until the arrival of the Scythian tribes.

== Characteristics ==
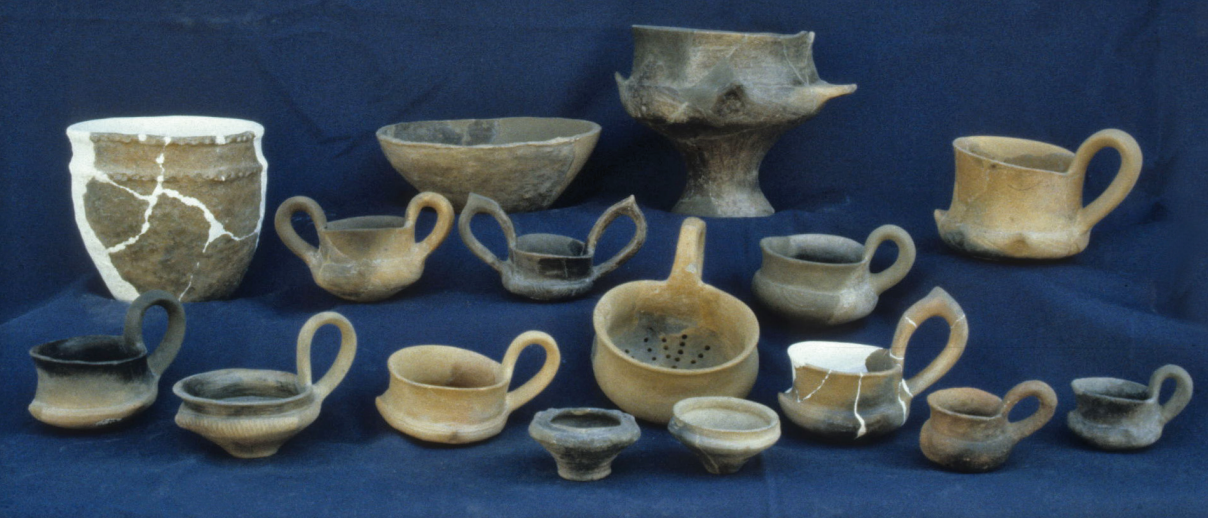
Bosut culture ceramics from Feudvar, Serbia

The Bosut culture is dated into early Iron Age, and it is generally divided into three development stages: 1. Kalakača-Bosut, 2. Basarabi, and 3. Bosut III. The area of this culture included territory of present-day Vojvodina and northern part of present-day Central Serbia.

Earliest settlements of the Bosut culture originated from the late Bronze Age Belegiš culture. Large fortified settlements were built on the sites of former settlements that were situated on a higher ground near rivers, on a slopes of Fruška Gora and Vršac Mountains, or on the edge of the Titel Hill. Large settlements were mutually interconnected into a chain of common defense. Smaller settlements and farms were located around larger ones. Houses in the fortified settlements were located close one to another, and narrow passes existed between them. Defensive trenches were located around settlement walls.

The main occupation of inhabitants of Bosut culture was agriculture and animal husbandry. Agricultural tools were similar to ones from the Bronze Age. Main market excesses were made from wheat, meat, and animal skin. These products were sold to Greek traders, who in turn brought luxury goods from south-east Europe, that were purchased by local aristocracy. The silver jewelry was especially appreciated.

Two mass graves discovered at Gomolava locality are indicating that inhabitants of the Bosut culture practiced human sacrifice.

== Localities ==
Localities of the Bosut culture are:

- Bosut Gradina
- Gomolava near Hrtkovci
- Židovar
- Feudvar near Mošorin
- Kalakača near Beška
