= Oroles =

Ancient king of Dacia

Oroles was a Dacian king during the first half of the 2nd century BC.

He successfully opposed the Bastarnae, blocking their invasion into Transylvania. The Roman historian Trogus Pompeius wrote about king Oroles punishing his soldiers into sleeping at their wives' feet and doing the household chores, because of their initial failure in defeating the invaders. Subsequently, the now "highly motivated" Dacian army defeated the Bastarnae and king Oroles lifted all sanctions.

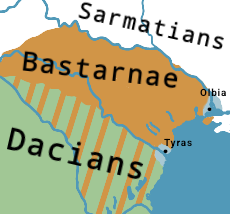
Bastarnae and Dacians map

The name Rolas is known from a military diploma of the Roman Imperial Age as name of a Dacian soldier. Therefore, it is possible that Oroles is an authentic Dacian name.

The settlement area of the Dacians under Oroles is not exactly known. It could have been located in eastern Transylvania or southern Moldavia.
