= Basarabi culture =

Prehistoric culture in southeastern Europe

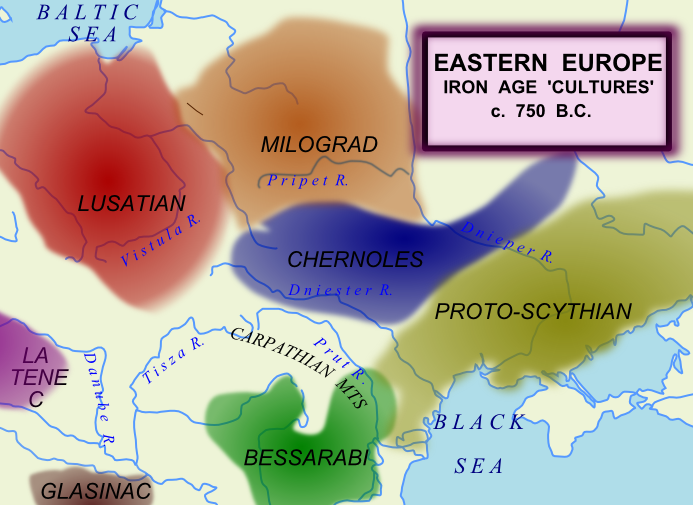
Eastern and Central Europe around 750 BC

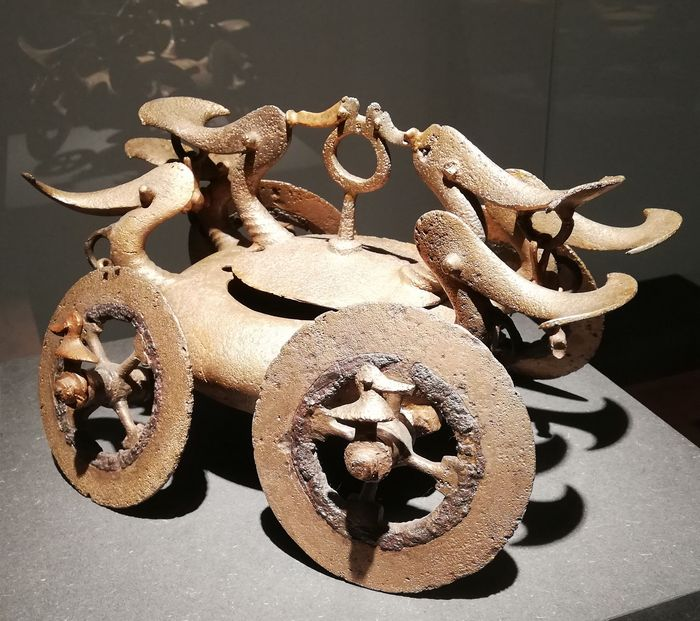
Bujoru votive wagon, Romania.

The Basarabi culture was an archaeological culture in Southeastern Europe (mainly in Romania), dated between 8th - 7th centuries BC. It was named after Basarabi, a village in Dolj County, south-western Romania, nowadays an administrative component of the Calafat municipality. It is sometimes grouped with related Bosut culture, into the Bosut-Basarabi complex.

The Basarabi culture is related to the Hallstatt culture of the Iron Age period that, when normalised, is uniformly spread apart from a reduced number of sites in Muntenia, the central Moldavian Carpathians and Oltenia.

The Hallstatt A (12-11th BC) and B (10-8th BC) correspond to the late Bronze Age Urnfield culture, Hallstatt C (7th BC) to the early Iron Age, and Hallstatt D (6th BC) to the Iron Age. The Hallstatt culture probably consisted of many different peoples and language groups. The variant known as the Basarabi culture was present over much of Romania, Bulgaria, Serbia (Vojvodina), and central Moldavia up to the Dniester River (Nistru in Romanian) around 650 BC.

During this period, the Greeks founded cities along the Black Sea coast, and the first written records describe their encounters with the indigenous people.
