= Vărădia =

- Commune
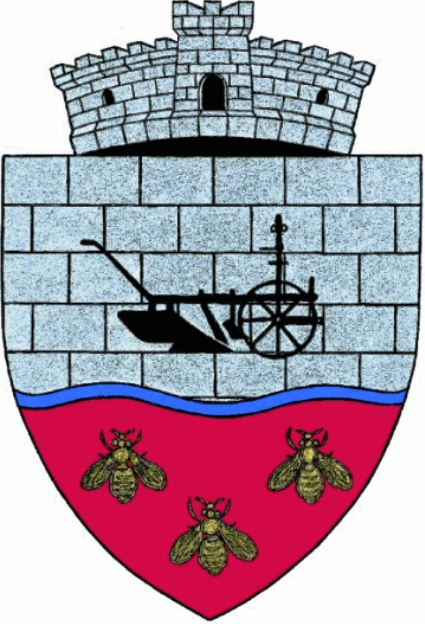
- Coat of arms

- Location in Caraș-Severin County

- Location in Romania
- Coordinates: 45°05′N 21°33′E
- Country: Romania
- County: Caraș-Severin

Government
  - Mayor (2020–2024): Dănuț Ionel Mușa (PNL)
- Area: 87.07 km^{2} (33.62 sq mi)
- Population (2021-12-01): 1,364
  - Density: 16/km^{2} (41/sq mi)
- Time zone: EET/EEST (UTC+2/+3)
- Postal code: 327420
- Area code: (+40) 02 55
- Vehicle reg.: CS
- Website: primariavaradiacs.ro

Vărădia (Hungarian: Varadia) is a commune in Caraș-Severin County, Banat, Romania. It is composed of two villages, Mercina (Mercsény) and Vărădia.

It is located near the border with Serbia, on the river Caraș, at a distance of 19 km (12 mi) from Oravița and 76 km (47 mi) from the county seat, Reșița.

In Vărădia village there is a Romanian Orthodox church, a Romanian Greek-Catholic church, a Baptist church, and an old Orthodox church which has become a monastery.

== See also ==
- Argidava
