= Tibiscum =

- Castra of Jupa; Tibisco, Tivisco, Tibiscus, Tibiskon, Tiriskon
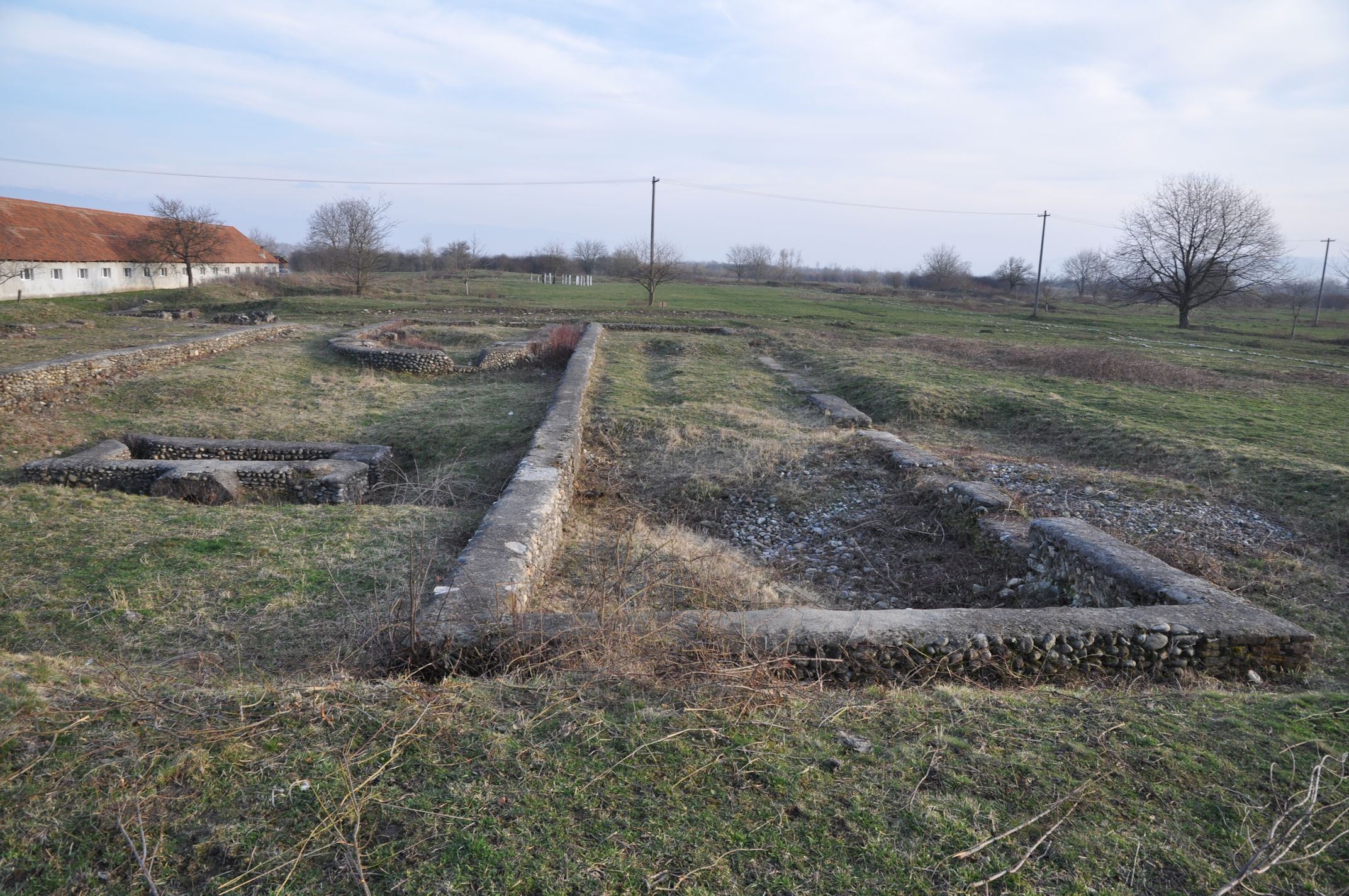

- Location within Romania
- 45.4663°N 22.1895°E
- Location: Jupa, Caraș-Severin, Romania

History
- Founded: c. 101 AD
- Built: Trajan
- Abandoned: c. 6th-7th century AD

Site notes
- Elevation: 180 m (590 ft)
- Excavation dates: 1924–1925, 1980–1990
- Archaeologists: Doina Benea, G. G. Mateescu, Ioan Boroș
- Condition: Ruined

Tibiscum (Tibisco, Tibiscus, Tibiskon) was a Dacian town mentioned by Ptolemy, later a Roman fort and municipium. The ruins of the ancient settlement are located in Jupa, near Caransebeș, Caraș-Severin County, Romania. The Roman settlement here was one of the most important vestiges of classical antiquity in Banat.

Located at the junction of two of the most important imperial roads that connected the capital Ulpia Traiana Sarmizegetusa with Dierna and Lederata, the city and the fort developed due to the fertile plain of the Timiş river and the commercial and strategic position occupied.

The remains of important buildings and workshops from the Roman fort and from the Roman civil settlement of Tibiscum are visible.

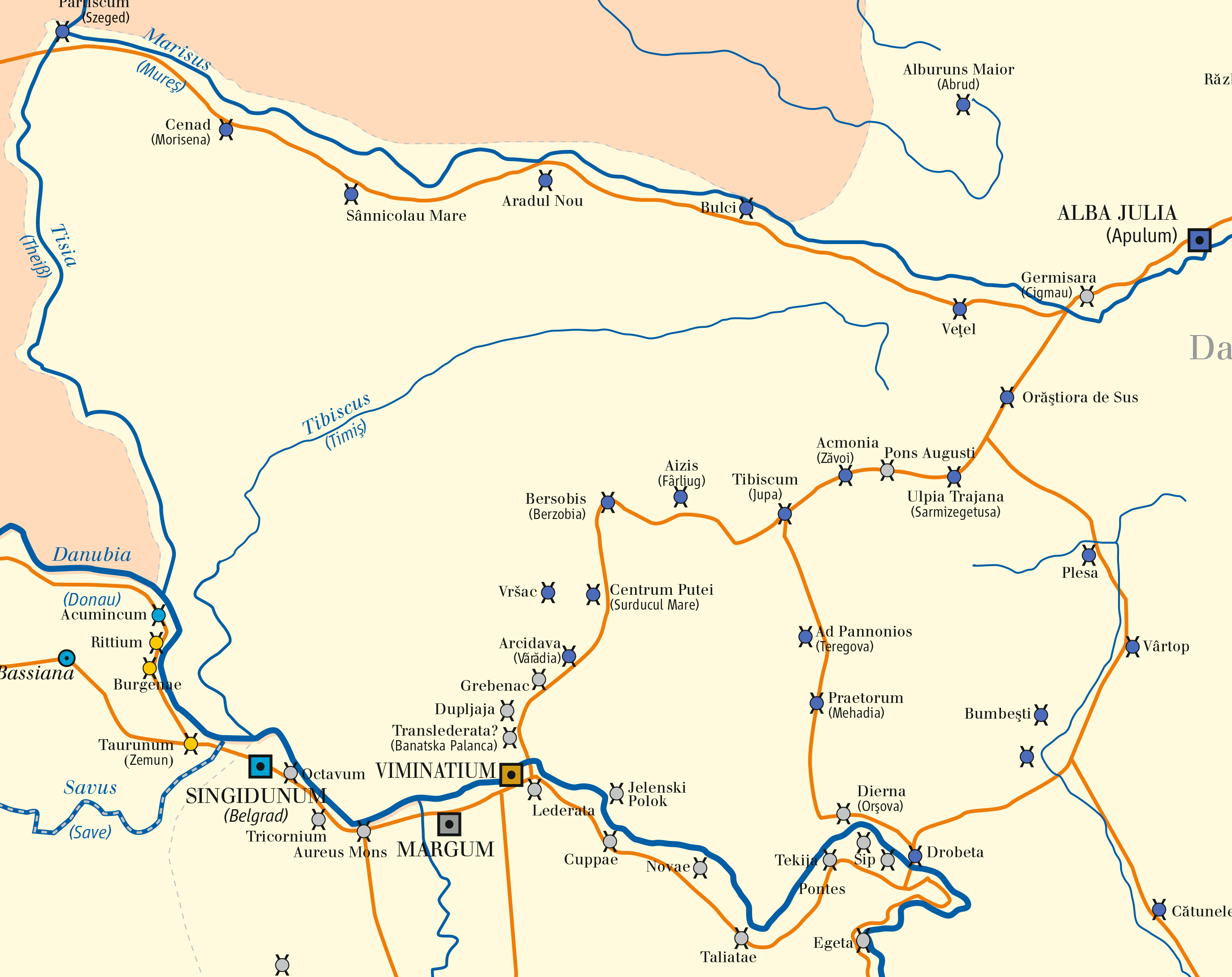
Western Dacia forts

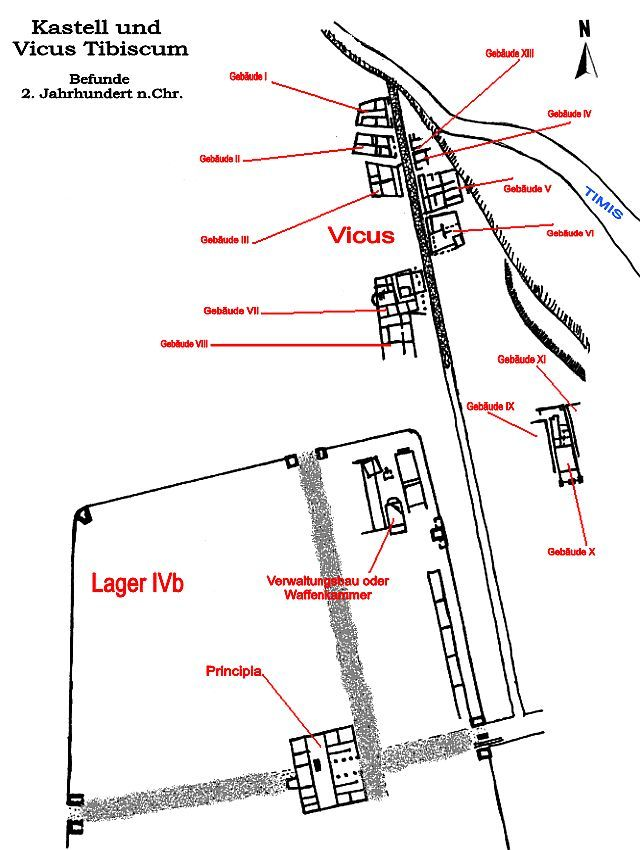
Plan of fort and Vicus

== History ==
By the end of Trajan's First Dacian War in 103 AD a detachment from a Roman unit, probably Legio IV Flavia Felix, had built here a castellum of approx. 60 x 60 m of earth and wood. This fort was destroyed in a violent fire very possibly when Longinus was taken prisoner by the Dacians.

By the end of Trajan's Second Dacian War, another castellum of earth and wood measuring 101 x 100 m, was erected on the site of the first castellum by Cohors I Sagittariorum which remained its garrison during the reign of Trajan. This auxiliary unit was composed at that time of 500 Syrian infantry who, towards the end of the second century AD increased to 1000.

Under Hadrian the walls were rebuilt in stone and an irregular unit, the Numerus Palmarenorum, Syrian archers from Palmyra, was also stationed here. Later in the 2nd century AD under Antoninus Pius an irregular unit of cavalry spearmen Numerus Maurorum was also garrisoned and an extension to the west and south of the fort was made to house the three auxiliary cohorts.

At the beginning of the 160s AD the fort was enlarged to 250 x 175 m with a slightly trapezoidal shape when Cohors I Vindelicorum milliaria eq. c.R., an auxiliary unit of 1000 soldiers of Celto-German origin, became the garrison.

The city was raised to municipium under Septimius Severus.

The site's building materials (spolia) were extensively reused starting from the tenth century.

The city is considered to have been like Divisiskos or Dibisskos, a subordinate location of the Archbishopric of Ohrid mentioned in 1018.

== See also ==
- Dacian davae
- List of ancient cities in Thrace and Dacia
- List of castra

== Sources ==
- Anonymous. Tabula Peutingeriana (in Latin).
- Ptolemy, Claudius (c. 140). Geographia [Geography] (in Ancient Greek). Sumptibus et typis Caroli Tauchnitii.
- Olteanu, Sorin. "Ptolemy's Dacia". Linguae Thraco-Daco-Moesorum (in Romanian and English). Archived from the original on 16 July 2011.
- Schütte, Gudmund (1917). Ptolemy's maps of northern Europe, a reconstruction of the prototypes. The Royal Danish Geographical Society.
