= Dionysupolis =

Coordinates: 43°24′36″N 28°09′47″E

Dionysupolis or Dionysoupolis or Dionysopolis or Dionysou polis (Ancient Greek: Διονύσου πόλις and Διονυσόπολις) was a town of ancient Thrace, later of Moesia, on the river Ziras. It was founded as a Thracian settlement in was founded in the 5th century BC, but was later colonised by the Ionian ancient Greeks and given the name Cruni or Krounoi (Κρουνοί). It was named Krounoi from the nearby founts of water. It was renamed as Dionysopolis after the discovery of a statue of Dionysus in the sea. Later it became a Greek-Byzantine and Bulgarian fortress. The town also bore the name Matiopolis.

It existed within the present town of Balchik, Bulgaria.

In the beginning of the 3rd century BC the city was relatively independent and included in the system of fortifications built by Diadohite.

In the 6th century the town was destroyed by an earthquake and the population moved within the new fortification, whose construction began at the end of the V and beginning of the 6th century.

Later, in the 7th century the town was in possession of the Bulgars and Slavs and was renamed first to Karvuna, and after that - Balik, after the name of Boyar Balik, who used it as a capital of its domain.

One of the most important discoveries in borders of the ancient Dionysopolis is the Temple of Greek mother-goddess Cybele. Many of the artifacts found there can be seen in Balchik History museum. Since 1994 the site has the status of cultural monument of national significance.
