= Maternus =

Maternus or Matiernus may refer to:

- Marcus Cornelius Nigrinus Curiatius Maternus (c. 40–c. 97), Roman senator and suffect consul of AD 83
- Curiatius Maternus, who appears in Tacitus's Dialogus de oratoribus; he may be the same person as the consul of 83
- Julius Maternus or Matiernus (fl. 87–90), Roman explorer of western Africa
- Maternus (rebel) (fl. 187), rebel leader during the reign of Commodus
- Maternus of Cologne (285–315; in legend, fl. 1st century), bishop of Trier and Cologne and Catholic saint
- Maternus (bishop of Milan) (fl. 316–328), Archbishop of Milan and Catholic saint
- Julius Firmicus Maternus (fl. 334–346), Latin writer, astrologer, and Christian apologist
- Maternus Cynegius (fl. 381–388), praetorian prefect and consul
