= Orfitus =

Orfitus is a surname. Notable people with the surname include:

- Memmius Vitrasius Orfitus (died c. 369), Roman politician
- Servius Cornelius Scipio Salvidienus Orfitus, multiple people, including:
  - Servius Cornelius Scipio Salvidienus Orfitus (consul 51) (died AD 66), Roman senator
  - Servius Cornelius Scipio Salvidienus Orfitus (executed by Domitian), Roman senator
- Virius Orfitus, Roman statesman
