= Marcus Cornelius Nigrinus Curiatius Maternus =

1st century Roman senator and general

Marcus Cornelius Nigrinus Curiatius Maternus was a Roman senator and general during the reign of Domitian. He was suffect consul during the nundinium of September to October AD 83 with Lucius Calventius Sextus Carminius Vetus. Although some experts consider him a rival with Trajan as heir apparent to the emperor Nerva, he is primarily known from inscriptions.

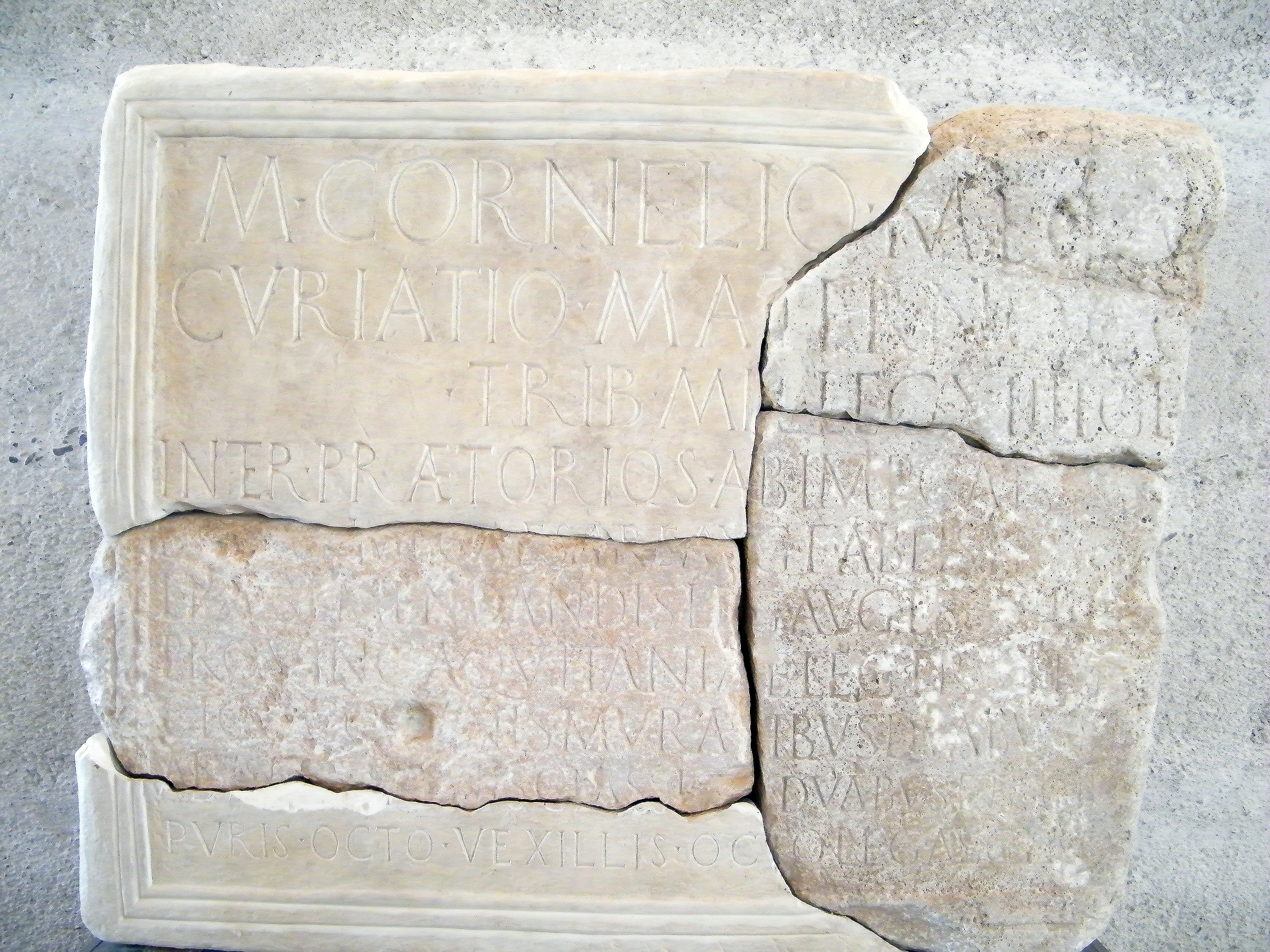
Inscription dedicated to Maternus

His polyonymous name has led to many interpretations. One, based on the form of his name used in consular dating ("M. Cornelius Nigrinus"), is that he was born Cornelius and adopted by a Curiatius Maternus (likely the orator of Tacitus' Dialogus de oratoribus), but Olli Salomies notes "the order of the names makes this altogether unlikely". Ronald Syme suggested that "not perhaps a Cornelius adopting a Curiatius (still less the reverse, as some incautiously assumed), but rather the son of a Curiatia. That is, a presumed sister of (C.?) Curiatius Maternus, orator, dramatist, and the central character in the Dialogus of Tacitus." Some authorities have suggested that this Curiatius is the same person as the orator in Tacitus' short work.

== Life ==
Maternus was born to the equestrian order; his hometown was Liria in Hispania, where an inscription honoring him was found. While still an eques, Maternus served as a military tribune of Legio XIV Gemina, which was stationed in Roman Britain at the time. He was adlected into the Roman Senate as an ex-praetor by Vespasian for his loyalty in the Year of Four Emperors.

He served as governor of Gallia Aquitania from AD 80 until at least as late as 83; we have no record of another governor for this province until 94, when Senecio Memmius Afer is known to have held the position. He was later governor of Moesia from 85 until its division into Moesia Inferior and Moesia Superior; subsequently he was governor of Moesia Inferior until 89. He apparently was involved in Domitian's Dacian War, for during his governorship Maternus received a number of dona militaria, or military decorations, including two mural crowns and two camp crowns.

A few years passed until Maternus was appointed to govern Syria in 95, which he held into the reign of Nerva.

== Maternus and Nerva ==
In a letter Pliny the Younger wrote to his friend Quadratus, while recounting an anecdote set during the short reign of the emperor Nerva, Pliny alludes to an unnamed man in charge of a massive army in the eastern part of the empire, about whom there was a lot of gossip, some causing apprehension. It is commonly presumed that this person was the governor of Syria; further, due to the date, this person is commonly assumed to be a rival to Trajan for the position of successor to Nerva.

It was thought that this unnamed person was Gaius Octavius Tidius Tossianus Lucius Javolenus Priscus, known to be governor of Syria in the 90s. However, Berriman, et al., believe it unlikely that Javolenus Priscus, "known as a jurist and member of Trajan's consilium rather than a military man, could have contemplated a challenge for the throne, much less that he would have remained in favour with Trajan thereafter". More recently Géza Alföldy and Helmut Halfmann have presented Maternus as the individual Pliny likely alluded to in his letter to Quadratus. An anomaly in the career of Aulus Larcius Priscus, suffect consul in 110, supports Maternus' identification. At the time, Priscus, who had been quaestor of Asia, then military tribune of Legio IV Scythica based in Syria, was appointed to the governorship of Syria. Syria was an important province, and its administration was usually assigned to a senior senator who had previously held the consulate. An appointment like this would only be made in an emergency, when something had happened to the previous governor. Any rival to Trajan, upon the latter's ascension to the throne, at the least would have been removed from an imperial position, and at most would have been executed. Whatever his fate, we have no record of Maternus after AD 97.

Political offices
| Preceded by Tettius Julianus, and Terentius Strabo Erucius Homullus as suffect consuls | Suffect consul of the Roman Empire; 83 with Lucius Calventius Sextus Carminius Vetus | Succeeded by Domitian X, and Gaius Oppius Sabinus as ordinary consuls |
