= Lucius Minicius Rufus =

1st century Roman senator, consul and governor

Lucius Minicius Rufus was a Roman senator. He was best known as an acquaintance of the philosopher and wonder-worker Apollonius of Tyana.

Rufus is known to have been proconsular governor of Bithynia et Pontus in AD 82/83, then afterwards appointed legatus propraetor, or imperial governor, of Gallia Lugdunensis for the years AD 83 to 87. These offices were followed by ordinary consul as the colleague of the emperor Domitian in AD 88.

Despite these promising achievements, Rufus, along with Servius Cornelius Scipio Salvidienus Orfitus, encountered the wrath of the emperor Domitian. According to Philostratus, Apollonius of Tyana journeyed to Rome to defend them in court. (Vita Apoll., vii.8-34)

Political offices
Preceded by G. Cilnius Proculus; L. Neratius Priscus as suffecti	Consul of the Roman Empire; January–April 88 with Domitian XIV; Decimus Plotius Grypus	Succeeded by Q. Ninnius Hasta; L. Scribonius Libo Rupilius Frugi Bonus as suffecti
