= Cilnia gens =

Ancient Roman gens

The gens Cilnia was an Etruscan family at ancient Rome, from the late Republic into imperial times. This gens is best known from Gaius Cilnius Maecenas, a trusted friend and advisor of Augustus, who was famous for his immense wealth and patronage of the arts. At least two of the Cilnii obtained the consulship under the Empire.

== Origin ==
The Cilnii hailed from the Etruscan city of Arretium, where they were amongst the local nobility, and had once held the title of Lucumo, or king. Their nomen was originally written Cfelne or Cfenle, which was subsequently Latinized as Cilnius, much as the Etruscan Lecne became Licinius. The Cilnii supported Roman interests in Etruria, and were expelled from Arretium in 301 BC, but regained their position with Roman aid.

== Branches and cognomina ==
The only family of the Cilnii to achieve prominence under the Republic bore the cognomen Maecenas, sometimes found as Maecaenas or Maecoenas. They claimed descent from Lars Porsena, the legendary king of Clusium, who played a prominent role in the early history of the Roman Republic. The name may be derived from a place, perhaps the same where the wines called the vina Maecenatiana were produced. On Etruscan funerary urns, the names of Cilnius and Maecenas occur separately, but never together, from which Müller concludes that these families did not unite until a later period. At Rome, the family was part of the equestrian order. Other surnames were borne by the Cilnii of Imperial times, including Paetinus, a diminutive of Paetus, originally given to someone bleary-eyed, and Proculus, an ancient praenomen that had fallen out of use, but was revived as a common surname. It seems to have been a diminutive of procus, a prince or nobleman, although by the time of Varro a popular etymology held that it originally designated a child born when his father was far from home.

== Members ==
This list includes abbreviated praenomina. For an explanation of this practice, see filiation.

- Gaius Cilnius Maecenas, an eques, who was instrumental in putting down the conspiracy of the tribune Marcus Livius Drusus in 91 BC; he was probably the grandfather, or perhaps the father, of the famous Maecenas.
- Gaius Cilnius Maecenas, a friend and supporter of Octavian, afterwards the emperor Augustus, whose trusted advisor he became.
- Gaius Cilnius P. f. Paetinus, praetor and legate under Tiberius.
- Gaius Cilnius Proculus, consul suffectus for the last four months of AD 87.
- Lucius Cilnius Secundus, commander of an auxiliary cohort stationed in Moesia Superior around AD 93.
- Gaius Cilnius C. f. Proculus, consul suffectus in AD 100, probably for the months of May and June. He is thought to be the son of Gaius Cilnius Proculus, the consul of 87.

== See also ==
- List of Roman gentes

== Bibliography ==
- Marcus Tullius Cicero, Pro Cluentio.
- Marcus Terentius Varro, De Lingua Latina (On the Latin Language).
- Gaius Plinius Secundus (Pliny the Elder), Historia Naturalis (Natural History).
- Dictionary of Greek and Roman Biography and Mythology, William Smith, ed., Little, Brown and Company, Boston (1849).
- Theodor Mommsen et alii, Corpus Inscriptionum Latinarum (The Body of Latin Inscriptions, abbreviated CIL), Berlin-Brandenburgische Akademie der Wissenschaften (1853–present).
- Karl Otfried Müller, Die Etrusker, Albert Heitz, Stuttgart (1877).
- Hermann Dessau, Inscriptiones Latinae Selectae (Select Latin Inscriptions, abbreviated ILS), Berlin (1892–1916).
- George Davis Chase, "The Origin of Roman Praenomina", in Harvard Studies in Classical Philology, vol. VIII, pp. 103–184 (1897).
- Paul A. Gallivan, "The Fasti for A.D. 70–96", in Classical Quarterly, vol. 31, pp. 186–220 (1981).
