= Plotius Grypus =

1st century Roman politician and senator

Plotius Grypus was a partisan of the Roman emperor Vespasian. He was the brother of the urban prefect Plotius Pegasus, and likely father of the identically named Plotius Grypus. The elder Grypus acceded to the suffect consulship for the period 13 January to April 88, succeeding the emperor Domitian.

A scholiast on Juvenal says that Grypus, like his brother Pegasus, were named by their father, an officer in the Roman navy, for ships he commanded. As an adult Grypus joined the military, and for siding with Vespasian during the strife of the Year of Four Emperors, the victorious emperor adlected him into the Roman Senate late in the year 69. Then in January 70 he replaced Tettius Julianus as praetor, after Julianus was alleged to have deserted his post as legatus legionis in Dacia when it had declared for Vespasian. A few days afterwards the rank was restored to Tettius when he made it known that he had fled for refuge to Vespasian, but Grypus retained his rank.

Edward Champlin has identified as his son another Plotius Grypus, mentioned by Statius in one of the poems collected in his Silvae (IV.9), who was "well launched on his senatorial career by the mid-90s". This identification was accepted by Brian W. Jones, who notes that when Statius wrote his poem for the younger Grypus, he made no reference to his consular father. While admitting that the older Grypus may have died before the Sarmatian War, Jones suggests that a more likely reason may have been that by the time Statius wrote, Grypus was in exile. The most likely reason for his exile would be as a result of the events of 70, when Tettius and Grypus struggled for the same praetorship, during which the old rivalry between the two revived, and so Tettius engineered Grypus' exile. "In 88, though, the position was vastly different: Julianus was the hero of Tapae, victor over the Dacians, whereas it had taken Grypus 18 years to reach the consulship. Jealousy may have caused him to attempt to undermine his former rival, and failure led to his banishment."

== Notes ==
Political offices
Preceded by Domitian XIV, and Lucius Minicius Rufus as Ordinary consuls	Suffect consul of the Roman Empire; 88 with Lucius Minicius Rufus	Succeeded by Quintus Ninnius Hasta, and Lucius Scribonius Libo Rupilius Frugi Bonus as Suffect consuls
