= Marcus Suillius Nerullinus =

1st century AD Roman senator and consul

Marcus Suillius Nerullinus was a Roman senator, who was active during the Principate. He was consul ordinarius in the year 50 with Gaius Antistius Vetus as his colleague.

Nerullinus was the son of Publius Suillius Rufus, who was suffect consul in 41 and a feared delator. His mother was the stepdaughter of Ovid, but we are not told her name. Anne-Marie Lewis has argued this woman was not only the daughter of Paullus Fabius Maximus, consul in 11 BC, and the daughter (whose name we do not know) of Servius Sulpicus Rufus, the son of the homonymous orator and jurist, but she was also the stepdaughter of Marcia, second wife of Paullus, with whom she had an affectionate and long-lasting relationship. Suillius Caesoninus was his brother.

The wealth and power of his father facilitated Nerullinus' advancement through his senatorial career. However, when a number of delatores, after successfully prosecuting his father for mismanagement while proconsular governor of Asia, they then attacked him "on the strength of men's hatred of the father and some charges of extortion. At that point the emperor Nero intervened and ended the prosecution, "as if implying that vengeance was fully satisfied."

Political offices
Preceded by Lucius Mammius Pollio, and Quintus Allius Maximus as suffect consuls	Suffect consul of the Roman Empire; 50 with Gaius Antistius Vetus	Succeeded by Claudius V, and Servius Cornelius Scipio Salvidienus Orfitus as ordinary consuls
