= Lucius Calventius Vetus Carminius =

Lucius Calventius Vetus Carminius was a Roman senator who flourished during the Principate. He was suffect consul in AD 51, replacing Servius Cornelius Scipio Salvidienus Orfitus. Carminius is known entirely from inscriptions.

In his monograph on Roman naming practices in the Early Empire, Olli Salomies noted that although he was better known as Lucius Calventius Vetus, his sons used the nomen Carminius as their gentilicium, and there is at least one known "Carminius" in Lusitania who may owe his citizenship to this man, which "seems to imply that he was originally a Carminius (Vetus?) and that he was adopted by a L. Calventius."

== Life ==
The cursus honorum of Carminius is preserved in an acephalous inscription at Rome. His earliest office was in the decemviri stlitibus judicandis, one of the four boards that formed the vigintiviri; membership in one of these four boards was a preliminary and required first step toward gaining entry into the Roman Senate. Next was as quaestor, and upon completion of this traditional Republican magistracy Carminius would be enrolled in the Senate. The next magistracy he held was plebeian tribune. Here the inscription lists the office curator locorum publicorum, which is odd because it was usually held after the next Republican magistracy Carminius is known to have achieved, praetor.

Once Carminius had completed his duties as praetor, he was eligible to hold a number of important responsibilities. The first recorded was praefectus frumenti dandi, or the prefect responsible for the distribution of Rome's free grain dole. Next he was governor of the imperial province of Lusitania; an inscription in his name found in the Roman villa of Ammaia at São Salvador da Aramenha, tells us his tenure was around the year 44. At some point he was admitted to the Quindecimviri sacris faciundis, one of the four most prestigious collegia or priesthoods of ancient Rome. The last office this inscription attests for Carminius, which he held after his consulship, is the proconsular governorship of Asia, which appears to have been during the 60s.

Carminius is known to have had two sons. One is Lucius Carminius Lusitanicus, suffect consul in 81; he was doubtlessly born during his father's tenure in Lusitania. The other is Lucius Calventius Sextus Carminius Vetus, suffect consul in 83.

Political offices
Preceded by Claudius V, and Servius Cornelius Scipio Salvidienus Orfitus as sordinary consuls	Suffect consul of the Roman Empire; 51 with Claudius V	Succeeded by Claudius V, and Titus Flavius Vespasianus
