= Lucius Calventius Sextus Carminius Vetus =

1st century Roman senator and suffect consul

Lucius Calventius Sextus Carminius Vetus was a Roman senator, who was active during the reign of Trajan. He was suffect consul in the nundinium of September to October AD 83 as the colleague of Marcus Cornelius Nigrinus Curiatius Maternus. He is known entirely from inscriptions.

Carmeninius Vetus received his polyonomous name from his father, Lucius Calventius Vetus Carminius, suffect consul in 51. This arose, according to Olli Salomies, apparently because "he was originally a Carminius (Vetus?) and that he was adopted by a L. Calventius." Vetus had a brother, Lucius Carminius Lusitanicus, suffect consul in 81.

Only one office is known to have been held by Vetus, proconsulate of Asia in 96/97. While governor, he sponsored the great-grandfather of Titus Flavius Carminius Athenagoras Claudianus, suffect consul around 190 for citizenship; the connection was honored by the man adopting not only elements of emperor Trajan's name for his own (namely "Marcus Ulpius"), but also the proconsul's gentilicum "Carminius", which were passed down to the father of the suffect consul, Marcus Ulpius Carminius Claudianus.

A number of other people are connected to Carminius Vetus. A kalator who flourished around 102, L. Calventius Eunomius, is sometimes thought to be the cliens of Vetus. Sextus Carminius Vetus, ordinary consul in 116 is thought to be his son based on similarities of name, and Sextus Carminius Vetus, ordinary consul in 150, is thought to be his grandson.

Political offices
Preceded by Tettius Julianus, and Terentius Strabo Erucius Homullus as suffect consuls	Suffect consul of the Roman Empire; 83 with Marcus Cornelius Nigrinus Curiatius Maternus	Succeeded by Domitian X, and Gaius Oppius Sabinus as ordinary consuls
