= Lucius Neratius Priscus (consul 87) =

1st century Roman senator and consul

Lucius Neratius Priscus was a Roman senator who held several posts in the emperor's service. He was suffect consul for the nundinium September–December AD 87 as the colleague of Gaius Cilnius Proculus. Priscus is known almost entirely from inscriptions recovered from Saepinum.

Based on G. Camodeca's restoration of one inscription, his career can to some extent be recovered. Priscus was adlected inter praetorios into the Roman Senate by Vespasian and Titus in either 73 or 74, most likely for his loyalty during the Year of Four Emperors. During the reign of Domitian, he served as prefectus aerarium Saturni from the year 84 to 86. Following his consulship, Priscus was legatus pro praetor, or governor, of the imperial province of Pannonia, which Werner Eck dates from 91 to 94.

Although the name of his wife is not known, it is known that Priscus had two sons, Marcellus and Priscus. Marcellus was adopted by Priscus' childless older brother, Marcus Hirrius Fronto Neratius Pansa, and became his heir. The short period between his consulship and his son's (AD 97), suggests that the older Priscus was fairly old when he attained this signal rank.

Political offices
Preceded by Gaius Bellicius Natalis Gavidius Tebanianus, and Gaius Ducenius Proculus as Suffect consuls	Suffect consul of the Roman Empire; 87 with Gaius Cilnius Proculus	Succeeded by Domitian XIV, and Lucius Minicius Rufus as Ordinary consuls
