= Tettius Julianus =

1st century Roman military general and politician

Lucius Tettius Julianus was a Roman general who held a number of imperial appointments during the Flavian dynasty. He was suffect consul for the nundinium of May–June 83 with Terentius Strabo Erucius Homullus as his colleague.

He may be the brother of Gaius Tettius Africanus, prefect of Egypt, who married Funisulana Vettulla, the daughter of Lucius Funisulanus Vettonianus, suffect consul in 78.

== Life ==
Julianus first appears in the historical record as the legatus legionis or commander of Legio VII Claudia, one of the three legions stationed in Moesia under Marcus Aponius Saturninus, and, along with his fellow commanders, received consular ornaments from Otho, in consequence of a victory which they gained over the Rhoxolani, a Sarmatian tribe. In some passages of Tacitus, he is called "Titius", in others "Tertius", but Tettius is probably the correct form.

Shortly afterwards, Aponius Saturninus made an attempt upon the life of Tettius, apparently because of an old grudge. Tettius escaped across Mount Haemus, and Lucius Vipstanus Messalla, commander of one of the cohorts, replaced him. Tettius took no part in the fighting or intrigue of the Year of the Four Emperors, although the legion which he commanded espoused the cause of Vespasian, and pleaded various delays which prevented Tettius from rejoining his troops. On the triumph of the party of Vespasian, he was, notwithstanding, appointed one of the praetors; but the Roman Senate would not allow him to enter upon the dignity, and conferred his office upon Plotius Grypus, on 1 January 70. Domitian, however, almost immediately afterwards restored him to the praetorship.

Tettius was commander of Legio III Augusta from 80 through 82, effectively making him also governor of Numidia those years; this was followed with his accession to suffect consul. The last office Tettius was known to have held was governor of Moesia Superior from 88 to 90.

In 88 he was appointed by Domitian as commander-in-chief and crossed the Danube probably near the legionary fortress of Viminacium, marched to Tibiscum and then to Tapae and the pass of the so-called Iron Gates and defeated the Dacians at the Second Battle of Tapae which effectively ended Domitian's Dacian War.

== Notes ==
Political offices
Preceded by Marcus Annius Messalla, and Gaius Fisius Sabinus as suffect consuls	Suffect consul of the Roman Empire; 83 with Terentius Strabo Erucius Homullus	Succeeded by Lucius Calventius Sextus Carminius Vetus, and Marcus Cornelius Nigrinus Curiatius Maternus as suffect consuls
