= Gaius Cilnius Proculus =

Late 1st/early 2nd century Roman senator, suffect consul and governor

Gaius Cilnius Proculus was a Roman senator active during the reign of Domitian. He was suffect consul for the nundinium September–December AD 87 with Lucius Neratius Priscus as his colleague. It is unknown how or if Proculus is related to the better-known Gaius Cilnius Maecenas. Proculus is known only through surviving inscriptions.

Proculus was the governor of Moesia Superior; the period of his administration has recently been dated as extending from the year 100 to 102. During his administration of the province, Proculus showed sufficient bravery in combat to be awarded dona militaria, or military decorations, likely as part of the Dacian Wars. A Gaius Cilnius Proculus is known to be governor of Dalmatia during the reign of Trajan, but Werner Eck considers that governor was more likely the suffect consul of the nundinium of March/April 100, and the son of this Proculus.

== See also ==
- Cilnia (gens)

Political offices
Preceded by Gaius Bellicius Natalis Gavidius Tebanianus, and Gaius Ducenius Proculus as Suffect consuls	Suffect consul of the Roman Empire; 87 with Lucius Neratius Priscus	Succeeded by Domitian XIV, and Lucius Minicius Rufus as Ordinary consuls
