= Julius Secundus =

Roman orator

Julius Secundus was a Roman orator and a friend of Quintilian. He is one of the speakers in Tacitus's short dialogue, Dialogus de Oratoribus. In his Institutio Oratoria, Quintilian praises Secundus for the elegance of his oratory as well as the "lucidity, smoothness and beauty" of his speech. Though he died an untimely death, Quintilian states that he still holds a high place, and would "undoubtedly have attained a great and enduring reputation" as an orator had he lived longer.
