= Marcus Aper =

Marcus Aper was a Roman orator and a native of Gaul, who rose by his eloquence to the rank of quaestor, tribune, and praetor, successively. He is introduced as one of the speakers in the Dialogus de oratoribus, attributed to Tacitus, defending the style of oratory prevalent in his day against those who advocated the ancient form.

Aper may have been the original commander of the military unit Ala Apriana.
