= Gaius Oppius Sabinus =

1st century Roman senator and consul

Gaius Oppius Sabinus (died AD 85) was a Roman Senator who held at least one office in the emperor's service. He was ordinary consul in the year 84 as the colleague of emperor Domitian.

Sabinus was probably the son or nephew of Spurius Oppius, suffect consul in the nundinium of October–December 43. Following his consulate, Oppius Sabinus acceded to governor of the imperial province of Moesia. He served in this position for only a few months when an army of Dacians under Diurpaneus crossed the Danube and invaded the province. Sabinus was killed in the winter of 85/86 AD fighting the invaders.

Administration of the province fell upon one of the legionary legates, until the new governor, Marcus Cornelius Nigrinus, could arrive. Meanwhile the Dacians ravaged the province and burned a number of forts along the Danube. Domitian, accompanied by his praetorian prefect Cornelius Fuscus, quickly traveled to Moesia with reinforcements to drive the Dacians out of Roman territories; these were the opening moves of Domitian's Dacian War.

Political offices
Preceded by Lucius Calventius Sextus Carminius Vetus, and Marcus Cornelius Nigrinus Curiatius Maternus as suffect consuls	Consul of the Roman Empire; 84 with Domitian X	Succeeded by Lucius Julius Ursus, and ignotus as suffect consuls
