= Curiatius Maternus =

1st century Roman dramatist

Curiatius Maternus (/məˈtɜːrnəs/) appears in the Dialogus de oratoribus (Dialogue on orators) of Tacitus. He was an author of tragedies in Latin, having composed a Domitius, a Medea, and a Cato by AD 74 or 75. He may be identified with the sophist Maternus who was put to death by Domitian for speaking against tyrants in a practice speech, or with either Marcus Cornelius Nigrinus Curiatius Maternus suffect consul in 83 himself, or his adoptive father.
