= Lucumo =

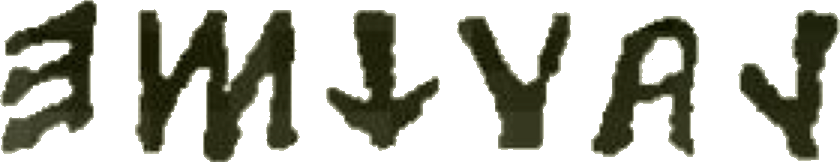
Lauchme (Lucumo) in the Etruscan (retrograde) alphabet, from Giuseppe Micali's Storia degli antichi popoli italiani (1836), Vol. I, p. 187

Lucumo (plural lucumones) is a Latin term that Roman antiquarian tradition glossed as the Etruscan word for rex, "king"; the gloss rests on a single authority, the late antique commentator Servius (4th–5th century AD). The term has traditionally been connected with the Etruscan onomastic element lauchumes. The identification with a royal title is now generally regarded as a late construction rather than a genuine piece of Etruscan institutional vocabulary: in the Etruscan epigraphic record lauchumes occurs as a personal name, and modern scholarship interprets the "king" gloss as the personification of a personal name, most likely that attributed by tradition to Lucius Tarquinius Priscus, whose original name is given by Roman sources as Lucumo.

== Name and evidence ==
Roman literary sources (Livy 1.34; Strabo 5.2.2) report that the future Tarquinius Priscus, born at Tarquinii to the Corinthian exile Demaratus and an Etruscan woman, bore the name Lucumo before moving to Rome. The same name is also given to other figures, including an Etruscan ally of Romulus and a leading man of Clusium.

In Etruscan inscriptions of the fifth to second centuries BCE, the form appears as a personal name, functioning as a praenomen but also as a nomen or cognomen; it underlies the gentilic names lauchumni (attested at Perugia) and lauchumsni (in the territory of Clusium). On the formal side, the attested forms belong to a sibilant stem lauchumes, while no Etruscan form corresponding exactly to Latin lucumo (an expected *lauchumu) is attested, and the connection between the two presents both phonetic and morphological difficulties.

Ancient erudition itself was not unanimous about the meaning of the word. Censorinus (De die natali 4.13) calls the lucumones the "powerful men of Etruria" (Etruriae potentes) who wrote down the teachings of Tages, without describing them as kings; Servius elsewhere (ad Aeneidem 5.560) records an opinion attributed to Varro under which lucumones simply meant "Etruscans"; and the epitome of Verrius Flaccus transmitted by Festus explains the word as a designation for madmen (ob insaniam dicti).

A related form, lauchumna (locative lauchumneti), appears in the Liber Linteus and has traditionally been rendered "in the palace"; this reading, dependent on the Servian gloss, has been questioned.

== Kingship and magistracy ==
Roman tradition describes the earliest phase of Etruscan history as monarchical, and the monarchical traditions are most strongly attached to the cities of southern Etruria. During the transition from the late sixth to the early fifth century BCE most Etruscan city-states are thought to have replaced their kings with republican magistracies. In the epigraphic record the supreme city magistrate of the fourth to second centuries is the zilath (zilath mechl rasnal), interpreted by Helmut Rix as a praetor rei publicae; the standard survey of Etruscan magistracies does not include lucumo among the attested offices.

Etruscan and Roman sources also mention a (con)federal organism embracing the twelve populi of Etruria. In the monarchical period the league is said to have been headed by a king elected from among the rulers of the twelve peoples; the ancient authors refer to this figure with a range of terms, including rex, lucumo, basileus and hegemon. With the advent of republican institutions the federal leader was chosen from among the zilath of the member cities, possibly bearing the title zilath cechaneri.

== Bibliography ==
- Agostiniani, Luciano (2003). "Etrusco lauχumes tra lessico e onomastica". In Marchesini, Simona; Poccetti, Paolo (eds.). Linguistica è storia. Sprachwissenschaft ist Geschichte. Scritti in onore di Carlo de Simone (in Italian). Pisa: Giardini. pp. 21–32.
- Briquel, Dominique (2019). "I re in Etruria: una realtà difficile da precisare". In Fiori, Roberto (ed.). Re e popolo. Istituzioni arcaiche tra storia e comparazione (in Italian). Göttingen: V&R unipress. pp. 247–274. doi:10.14220/9783737010221.247. ISBN 978-3-8471-1022-4.
- Camporeale, Giovannangelo (2000). Gli Etruschi. Storia e civiltà (in Italian). Turin: UTET.
- Cristofani, Mauro (1991). "Lucumones, qui reges sunt lingua Tuscorum". Archeologia Classica (in Italian). 43: 553–557.
- Maggiani, Adriano (1996). "Appunti sulle magistrature etrusche". Studi Etruschi (in Italian). 62: 95–118.
- Tagliamonte, Gianluca (2017). "Political organization and magistrates". In Naso, Alessandro (ed.). Etruscology. Berlin–Boston: De Gruyter. pp. 121–141.
