= Servius Cornelius Scipio Salvidienus Orfitus (consul 51) =

1st century AD Roman senator and consul

Servius Cornelius Scipio Salvidienus Orfitus (died AD 66) was a Roman senator, and consul ordinarius for the year 51, as the colleague of the emperor Claudius. His father Orfitus was one of the seven sons of Vistilia, a noblewoman who came from a family that had held the praetorship, although some have erroneously stated Servius himself was the husband of Vistilia. He became a member of the gens Cornelia through adoption by an otherwise unknown Servius Cornelius Scipio.

His career is set forth in an inscription found at Lepcis Magna, dated to AD 61 or 62. According to the inscription, he was first quaestor to the emperor Claudius, then praetor urbanus; both of these are prestigious offices, and he likely owed them to his father's half-brother, Publius Suillius Rufus, who was an intimate associate of Claudius. Following his consulate in 51, Servius was inducted into the collegia of Pontifices and the sodales Augustales, two socially powerful groups. He was proconsular governor of Africa for the term Summer 62/Summer 63; one Publius Silius Celer is mentioned as his legatus or assistant.

Our next glimpse of Orfitus is in Tacitus, who records that in AD in 65 that he proposed that the months of May and June be renamed Claudius and Germanicus, respectively, in honor of the emperor Nero, explaining that the deaths of Decimus and Lucius Junius Silanus Torquatus had rendered the name "Junius" inauspicious. Frederik Juliaan Vervaet has argued that instead of an act of flattery, Nero and his partisans may have interpreted this proposal as a subtle form of criticism. If so, it would explain the actual motivation for Marcus Aquilius Regulus accusing Orfitus in the Senate of being a traitor to Nero the following year. Regardless of the motivation, Orfitus was found guilty and executed.

Orfitus' son, Servius, was consul at some point before AD 87, under the Flavian dynasty, but the year has not been determined. A grandson, also named Servius Cornelius Scipio Salvidienus Orfitus, followed in their footsteps and became consul in AD 110, under the emperor Trajan.

Political offices
Preceded by Gaius Antistius Vetus, and Marcus Suillius Nerullinus as Ordinary consuls	Consul of the Roman Empire; 51 with Tiberius Claudius Caesar Augustus Germanicus	Succeeded by Lucius Calventius Vetus Carminius as Suffect consul
