= Second Battle of Tapae =

Battle in 88 AD

The Second Battle of Tapae in 88 AD was a battle fought between the forces of the Roman emperor Domitian and King Decebalus of Dacia.

== History ==
After the First Battle of Tapae in 86 AD, one of the most humiliating defeats of the period and in which Rome lost two entire legions, a year of peace followed.

When the war was resumed after a year of preparations, Domitian promoted as new commander in chief, Tettius Julianus. He crossed the Danube, probably at the legionary fortress of Viminacium, and used the westernmost road leading to Dacia which led to Tibiscum and then to Tapae to arrive by the following autumn to reach the plain of Caransebeș, in front of the pass of the so-called Iron Gates (near the current Otelu Rosu). He perhaps used an enveloping approach march conducted in several columns, not without great difficulties due to the continuous attacks of the Dacians.

Roman victory at this major battle was followed by a massacre of Dacians. Tettius, however, did not march on the enemy capital of Sarmizegetusa Regia as Decebalus managed to halt their advance into enemy territory due perhaps to the difficulty of crossing the Iron Gates in a season close to winter.

=== Aftermath ===
After the battle, the course of events is unclear. Suetonius mentions that there were "several battles of varying success" (against the Dacians).

The Roman victory had reduced Decebalus to the defensive, but he was saved by events elsewhere.
