= Domitian's Dacian War =

Conflict between the Roman Empire and the Dacia (86-88 AD)

- Part of the Dacian Wars
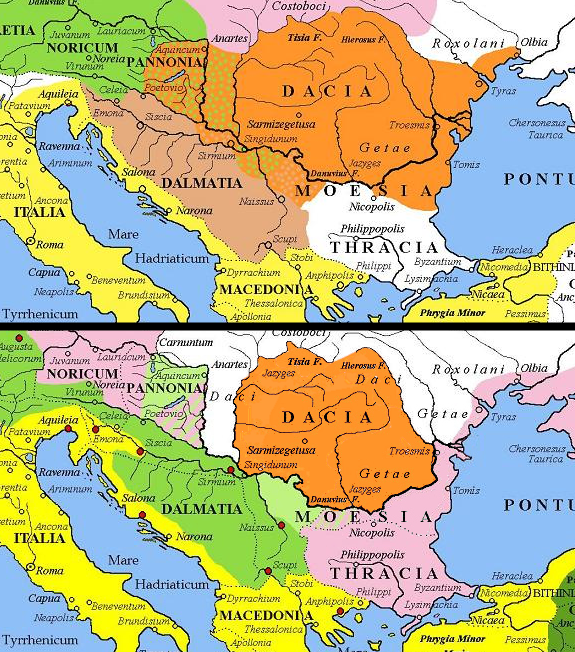
- Map of Dacia
Date	85–89
Location	Moesia, Dacia 43°58′N 21°08′E
Result	Dacian victory

Belligerents
Dacian Kingdom	Roman Empire

Commanders and leaders
Decebalus	Oppius Sabinus †; Domitian; Cornelius Fuscus †; Tettius Julianus

Casualties and losses
Unknown	2 legions
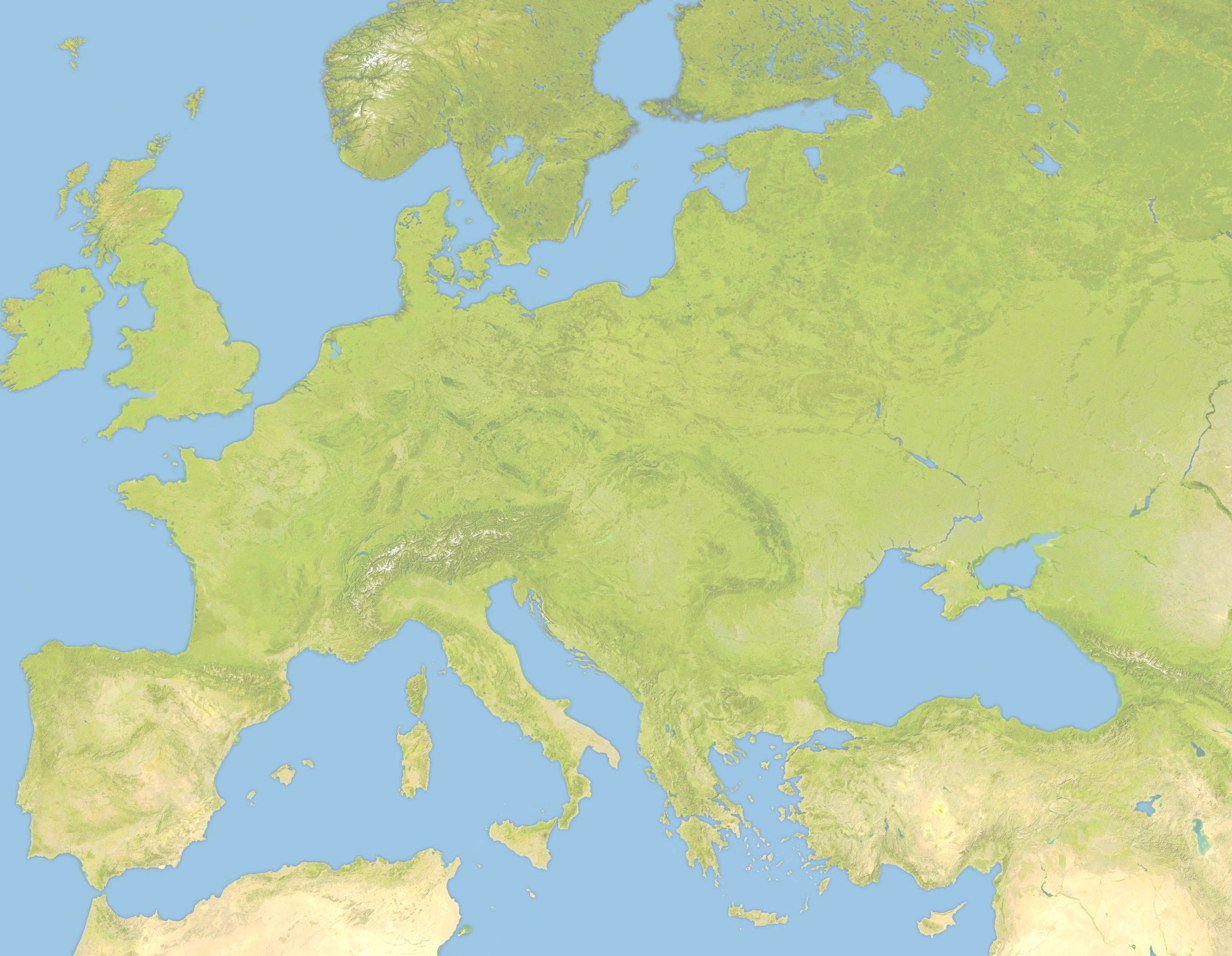
- Location within Serbia Domitian's Dacian War (Romania) Domitian's Dacian War (Europe without the extreme north)

Domitian's Dacian War was a conflict between the Roman Empire and the Dacian Kingdom, which had invaded the province of Moesia. The war occurred during the reign of the Roman emperor Domitian, in the years 85–89 AD.

== Background ==
Since the reign of Burebista, widely considered the greatest Dacian king (r. 82-44 BC), the Dacians had represented a threat to the Roman Empire. Caesar himself had drawn up a plan to launch a campaign against Dacia. The threat was reduced when dynastic struggles in Dacia led to a division into four (or five, depending on the source) separately governed tribal states after Burebista died in 44 BC. Augustus later came into conflict with Dacia after it sent envoys offering its support against Mark Antony in exchange for "requests". Augustus rejected the offer and Dacia supported Antony. In 29 BC, Augustus sent several punitive expeditions into Dacia led by Marcus Licinius Crassus Dives, the consul of the prior year, that inflicted heavy casualties and apparently killed three of their five kings. Although Dacian raids into Pannonia and Moesia continued for several years despite the defeat, the threat of Dacia had effectively ended.

In the winter of 85/86 AD after 116 years of relative peace along the Roman frontier, King Duras led by General Diurpaneus, swarmed over the frozen Danube and pillaged Moesia. It seems that the Romans were caught by surprise since the governor, Oppius Sabinus, and his forces, possibly including the Legio V Alaudae, were annihilated.

Following this attack, Domitian led legions into the ravaged province accompanied by Cornelius Fuscus, Prefect of the Praetorian Guard, personally arrived in Moesia, reorganised the province into Moesia Inferior and Moesia Superior and planned a future attack into Dacia. To replenish their forces and greatly strengthen the Roman army in this territory, the Legio IV Flavia Felix from Dalmatia and two more legions, the I and II Adiutrix, were moved to Moesia from the western provinces. The region of Sirmium was attached to Moesia Superior, in order to have a single command over the endangered Dacian frontier.

Historians are divided as to what happened next. A. Mócsy suggests that after handing over the command to Fuscus, Domitian returned to Rome in the same year, while Fuscus cleared the Dacian invaders from the province. According to E. T. Salmon and M. Bunson, however, Domitian personally led the successful operations, then returned to Rome to celebrate a double triumph.

== The War ==
=== First Battle of Tapae ===
With the arrival of fresh legions in 87 AD, Domitian began what became the First Dacian War. General Diurpaneus sent an envoy to Domitian offering peace but it was rejected.

Cornelius Fuscus crossed the Danube into Dacia with 5 or 6 legions on a pontoon bridge. However, at the First Battle of Tapae his army was ambushed by Decebalus and attacked on all sides. Although Fuscus attempted to rally his men, the attempts proved unsuccessful and Fuscus himself died in the battle. The battle standard of the Praetorian Guard was also lost, and although the Praetorian cohorts would be restored, the Legio V Alaudae was permanently destroyed. It was one of the most humiliating defeats of the period and Rome lost two entire legions, a defeat on par with the massacre of the Battle of Teutoburg Forest in 9 AD.

=== 88 AD ===
The war was resumed after a year of preparations. Domitian promoted as new commander in chief, Tettius Julianus, who, having crossed the Danube, probably at the legionary fortress of Viminacium, managed in the following autumn to reach the plain of Caransebeș, in front of the Iron Gates, perhaps after an enveloping approach conducted in several columns, and not without great difficulties due to the continuous attacks of the Dacians.

At Tapae Roman victory at the major Second Battle of Tapae was followed by a massacre of Dacians. Tettius, however, did not march on the enemy capital of Sarmizegetusa Regia as Decebalus managed to halt their advance into enemy territory due perhaps to the difficulty of crossing the Iron Gates in a season close to winter.

=== 89 AD ===
After the battle, the course of events is unclear. Suetonius mentions that there were "several battles of varying success" (against the Dacians).

The Roman victory had reduced Decebalus to the defensive, but he was saved by a series of events:

- the revolt of Lucius Antonius Saturninus who had proclaimed himself emperor among the legions of Upper Germany
- an armed revolt of the Marcomanni, Quadi and Sarmatians who until then had recognised the sovereignty of Rome and had protected the Pannonian frontier for decades.

== Peace ==
These events inevitably caused the withdrawal of the Roman armies from Dacia and the signing of a peace treaty. Conciliatory and diplomatic attitudes prevailed on both sides and honour was safe for both. Decebalus became "client king", albeit only nominally, earning Roman gratitude and help by sending expert carpenters, engineers who helped him build defensive fortifications and an annual subsidy of 8 million sesterces. His brother Diegis was sent to Rome to receive from the hands of Domitian himself the crown to be given to the king of the Dacians as a sign of alliance and submission.

== Aftermath ==
For the remainder of Domitian's reign Dacia remained a relatively peaceful client kingdom, but Decebalus used the Roman money to fortify his defences. Domitian probably wanted a new war against the Dacians, and reinforced Upper Moesia with two more cavalry units brought from Syria and with at least five cohorts brought from Pannonia. Trajan continued Domitian's policy and added two more units to the auxiliary forces of Upper Moesia, using the buildup of troops for his Dacian wars.

== See also ==
- Dacian warfare

== Bibliography ==
- Brodersen, Kai (2020). Dacia felix: Das antike Rumänien im Brennpunkt der Kulturen. Darmstadt: wbg. ISBN 978-3-8053-5059-4.
- Griffin, Miriam (2000). "The Flavians". The Cambridge Ancient History. Vol. XI (2 ed.). Cambridge University Press. pp. 1–83.
- Jones, Brian W. (1992). The Emperor Domitian. Routledge.
- MacKendrick, Paul Lachlan (1975). The Dacian Stones Speak. The University of North Carolina Press.
- Mattern, Susan P. (1999). Rome and the Enemy: Imperial Strategy in the Principate. University of California Press.
