= Servius Cornelius Scipio Salvidienus Orfitus (executed by Domitian) =

First century Roman senator and consul

Servius Cornelius Scipio Salvidienus Orfitus was a Roman senator who lived in the first century AD. He was a descendant of Orfitus, who was adopted by Servius Cornelius Scipio, an otherwise unknown member of the patrician branch of the Cornelii Scipiones.

Orfitus was the son of the consul of the year 51, Servius Cornelius Scipio Salvidienus Orfitus, who had been executed by the emperor Nero for allegedly participating in a plot against the emperor. Despite the history of his family, Domitian selected the younger Orfitus to serve as suffect consul. "Given his pedigree," observes Brian W. Jones, "it ought to be remarkable that a son of Nero's Orfitus was elevated to the consulship by Domitian early in his reign." In the same book Jones has noted Orfitus was not the only such surprising case, and speculates that Domitian "wished to compromise them in the eyes of their supporters, perhaps he merely hoped to gain their support." The date of his consulship is unknown; Attilio Degrassi dated his office as "before 87", and that is as close as one can be.

According to Suetonius, he was banished to an island for attempting to overthrow the emperor (molitor rerum novarum), then later executed. Philostratus provides a little more information. On the one hand Orfitus was thought to be a suitable candidate for imperial power, while on the other hand Philostratus states he was no more capable of planning treason than Nerva. While Jones admits that the comparison with Nerva was "a back-handed compliment in view of that senator's reputation for treachery", he argues that Philostratus meant to be laudatory: "he was not interested in wealth and was indifferent to public affairs." Non-participation in public affairs was a serious matter, and was considered by "suspicious emperors as evidence of treason."

While we know nothing about his wife, Orfitus did have a son, who shared the same name, Servius Cornelius Scipio Salvidienus Orfitus consul in 110.
