= Cornelius Fuscus =

1st century AD Roman general and Praetorian Prefect

- Born: Unknown
- Died: June 9, 86 AD; Dacia
- Military career
- Allegiance: Roman Empire
- Service years: 81–86
- Rank: Praetorian prefect
- Unit: Praetorian Guard--Legio V Alaudae
- Commands: Praetorian Guard (81–86); Legio V Alaudae (86)
- Conflicts: Year of the Four Emperors; Dacian Wars
- Other work: Imperial procurator of Illyricum

Cornelius Fuscus (died 86 AD) was a Roman general who fought campaigns under the Emperors of the Flavian dynasty. He first distinguished himself as one of Vespasian's most ardent supporters during the civil war of 69 AD, known as the Year of the Four Emperors. Vespasian's son Domitian employed Fuscus as prefect of the Praetorian Guard, a post he held from 81 until his death.

In 85 AD the Dacians, led by King Decebalus, invaded the Roman Empire at Moesia, a province located south of the Danube. In response, Domitian dispatched Cornelius Fuscus to the region with five legions. Although Fuscus was initially successful in driving the invaders back across the border, the prefect suffered defeat when he was ambushed along with Legio V Alaudae during an expedition into Dacia, at the First Battle of Tapae. The entire legion was annihilated, and Fuscus killed.

== Year of the Four Emperors ==
=== Reign of Galba ===
Little is known of the life of Cornelius Fuscus prior to his appearance in the civil war of 69. The Roman historian Tacitus informs us that he was born into an aristocratic family, but renounced a senatorial career in favour of a life of "quiet repose" as an equestrian. He enters history upon the accession of Galba on June 9, in the year 68.

About six months earlier, Gaius Julius Vindex, the governor of Gallia Lugdunensis, had rebelled against tax policies instituted by Emperor Nero. To gain support, Vindex had called upon Galba, the governor of Hispania Tarraconensis, to declare himself Emperor. Galba was one of Rome's oldest generals, enjoying considerable prestige and widespread political support. Nero's own popularity was already on the decline, but nonetheless, he managed to crush the revolt by quickly sending the governor of Germania Superior, Virginius Rufus, to Gaul, where Vindex was defeated in a battle near Vesontio. Galba was declared a public enemy, and his legion confined to the city of Clunia. The victory proved insufficient to restore Nero's damaged reputation however. Rumours quickly spread across the Empire that multiple legions were defecting to Galba's side. By June of 68, the Senate had voted Galba the Emperor and declared Nero a public enemy. Nero's fate was ultimately sealed when Nymphidius Sabinus, the prefect of the Praetorian Guard, bribed his soldiers to desert their Emperor. On June 9 in 68 AD, Nero committed suicide, and with him the Julio-Claudian dynasty came to an end.

Despite Nero's unpopularity, many provinces were reluctant to accept Galba as his successor. Cornelius Fuscus was among those who declared their support for the new Emperor early. According to Tacitus, Fuscus was vital in acquiring the support of an unspecified Roman colony in Spain, Northern Italy, or Gaul, a service for which he was rewarded with the procuratorship of Illyricum.

Galba's troubles were far from over, however, and soon legions posted in Germania, as well as the Praetorian Guard in Rome, revolted. On January 15, 68, Galba was murdered and replaced by Otho, governor of Lusitania, who himself quickly perished against the armies of Vitellius, governor of Germania. Shortly thereafter, Titus Flavius Vespasianus, a general stationed in Judaea, declared war on Vitellius.

=== War of Vespasian ===
Vespasian joined forces with the governor of Syria, Gaius Licinius Mucianus, who was to conduct the war against Vitellius, while Vespasian himself travelled to Egypt to secure the grain supply to Rome. Not long after, the provinces of Illyricum, Pannonia and Dalmatia defected to the side of the Flavians, at the instigation of Marcus Antonius Primus and Cornelius Fuscus. According to Tacitus, Fuscus was eager for battle:

Embracing the cause of Vespasian, [Fuscus] lent the movement the stimulus of a fiery zeal. Finding his pleasure not so much in the rewards of peril as in peril itself, to assured and long acquired possession he preferred novelty, uncertainty, and risk.

The defection of Antonius Primus and Fuscus was a major blow for Vitellius. Fuscus and Primus led Vespasian's Danube legions in the invasion of Italy. Fuscus led the Legio V Alaudae in the war, and was appointed commander of the fleet of Ravenna when it turned to Vespasian. Fuscus led the Alaudae in the Second Battle of Bedriacum and helped the legions on the left wing, and commanded the legion during the conquest of Rome.

== Dacian wars ==
Nothing is recorded of Fuscus' activities in the eleven years Vespasian (69–79) and then his son Titus (79–81) were in power. He re-emerges as a prefect of the Praetorian Guard under Emperor Domitian (81–96), a post he held from at least 81 until his death in 86.

Sometime around 84 or 85 the Dacians, led by King Decebalus, crossed the Danube into the province of Moesia, wreaking considerable havoc and killing the Moesian governor Gaius Oppius Sabinus. Domitian immediately launched a counteroffensive, personally travelling to the region accompanied by a large force commanded by Cornelius Fuscus. Fuscus successfully drove the Dacians back across the border in mid-85, prompting Domitian to return to Rome and celebrate an elaborate triumph.

The victory proved to be short-lived however, as early in 86, Fuscus embarked on an ill-fated expedition into Dacia, which resulted in the complete destruction of the fifth legion, Legio V Alaudae, near Tapae. As Fuscus's men marched into Dacia, the forces of Decebalus attacked from all sides, and Fuscus attempted to rally his men, but was unsuccessful. Fuscus was killed, and the battle standard of the Praetorian Guard lost. The Praetorian cohorts would be restored, but the 5th Alaudae was never reformed.
