= Dialogus de oratoribus =

Book by Publius Cornelius Tacitus

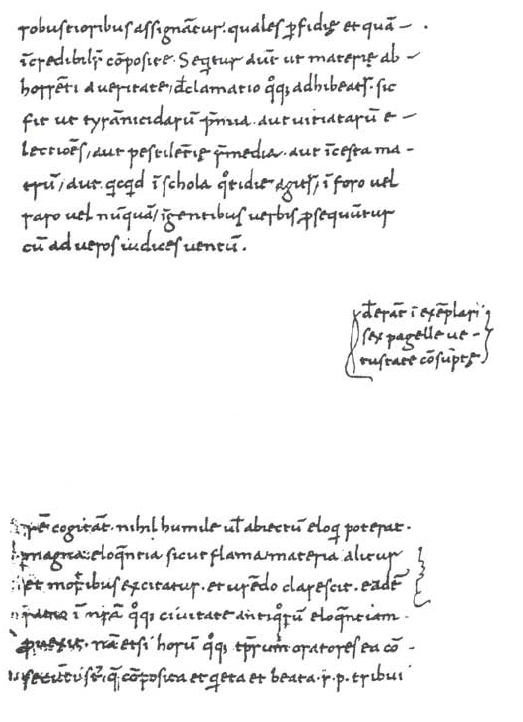
A page of the Dialogus de oratoribus in the Leiden Manuscript

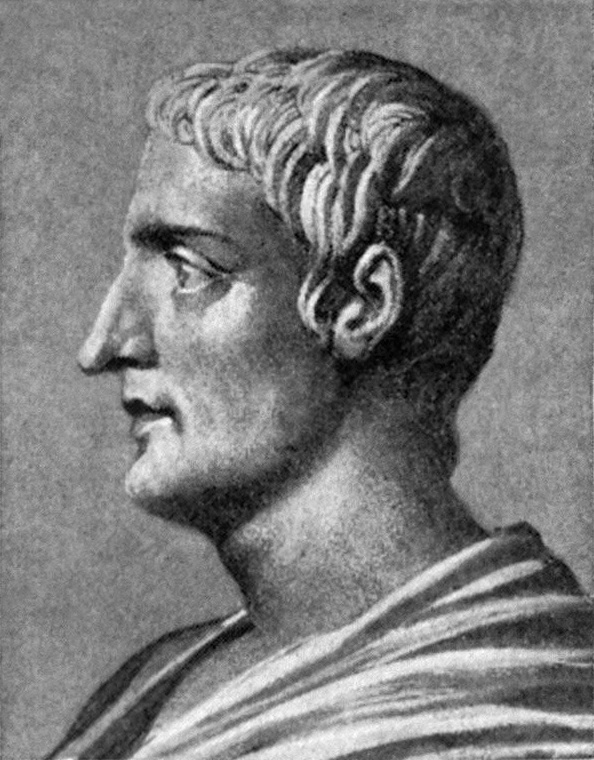
Image of Tacitus

The Dialogus de oratoribus is a short work attributed to Tacitus, in dialogue form, on the art of rhetoric. Its date of composition is unknown, though its dedication to Lucius Fabius Justus places its publication around 102 AD.

== Summary ==
The dialogue itself, set in the 70s AD, follows the tradition of Cicero's speeches on philosophical and rhetorical arguments. It is set in the home of Curiatius Maternus, one of the speakers, to whom two leading lawyers of the day, Marcus Aper and Julius Secundus, have come to discuss a recent event; the fourth speaker, Lucius Vipstanus Messalla, arrives later. All four men are attested historical personages. The beginning of the work is a speech in defence of eloquence and poetry. It then deals with the decadence of oratory, for which the cause is said to be the decline of the education, both in the family and in the school, of the future orator. The education is not as accurate as it once was; the teachers are not prepared, and a useless rhetoric often takes the place of the general culture.

After a lacuna, the Dialogus ends with a speech delivered by Maternus reporting what some believe is Tacitus's opinion. Maternus thinks that great oratory was possible with the freedom from any power, more precisely in the anarchy, that characterized the Roman Republic during the civil wars. It became anachronistic and impracticable in the quiet and ordered society that resulted from the institution of the Roman Empire. The peace, warranted by the Empire, should be accepted without regret for a previous age that was more favorable to the wide spread of literacy and the growth of great personality.

== Critical evaluation ==
Some believe that at the base of all of Tacitus's work is the acceptance of the Empire as the only power able to save the state from the chaos of the civil wars. The Empire reduced the space of the orators and of the political men, but there is no viable alternative to it. Nevertheless, Tacitus does not accept the imperial government apathetically, and he shows, as in the Agricola the remaining possibility of making choices that are dignified and useful to the state.

The date of publication of the Dialogus is uncertain, but it was probably written after the Agricola and the Germania. Many characteristics set it apart from the other works of Tacitus, so much so that its authenticity may be questioned, even if it is always grouped with the Agricola and the Germania in the manuscript tradition. The way of speaking in the Dialogus seems closer to the model of Cicero, refined but not prolix, which inspired the teaching of Quintilian; it lacks the incongruities that are typical of Tacitus's major historical works. It may have been written when Tacitus was young; its dedication to Fabius Iustus would thus give the date of publication, but not the date of writing. More probably, the unusually classical style may be explained by the fact that the Dialogus is a work of rhetoric. For this genre the structure, the language, and the style of Cicero were the usual models.
