= Tapae =

Fortified settlement in Dacia

- Location within Romania
- 45.5056°N 22.7247°E
- Location: Culmea Cătanelor, Zeicani, Hunedoara, Romania

Site notes
- Condition: Ruined

Tapae was a fortified settlement, guarding Sarmizegetusa, the main political centre of Dacia. Its location was on the Iron Gates of Transylvania, a pass between Țarcului and Poiana Ruscă Mountains and connecting the Banat to Țara Hațegului. This made it one of very few points through which invaders could enter Transylvania from the south. Moreover, 8 kilometres down the passage into Țara Hațegului, there is Sarmizegetusa Regia.

The place is the site of three battles between Dacians and Romans.

Dio Cassius notes the existence of a military camp there during the Dacian Wars.

Nowadays there is a small village on this site named Zeicani, located within Sarmizegetusa commune.
