= History of Dacia =

The history of Dacia comprises the events surrounding the historical region roughly corresponding to the present territory of Romania and Moldova and inhabited by the Getae and Dacian peoples, with its capital Sarmizegetusa Regia.

After clashing first with the Macedonians (4th century BC) and then with the Thracians (3rd century BC), in the 1st century BC the Dacians succeeded in establishing, under King Burebista, a stable autonomous kingdom. Upon the death of the great ruler, however, his kingdom dissolved; a fluid situation ensued, with numerous clashes with the Roman Empire, which had meanwhile reached the southern borders of Dacia. In 101 AD, Emperor Trajan launched a campaign to conquer the area, which ended in 106 with the death of King Decebalus and the establishment of a new province (see Roman Dacia). However, Roman rule already came to an end in the 3rd century, when the limes was returned to the Danube. Later invaded by Goths, Slavs, and other nomadic peoples, with the transition from Antiquity to the Middle Ages Dacia ceased to be understood as a unitary region and its territory was broken up between Transylvania, Wallachia, Moldova and Bessarabia.

== First political entities in the region (6th to 2nd centuries BC) ==
It is to Herodotus that the first indications of the indigenous population of Dacia are due. In fact, he described the population of the Getae of Dobruja, who in 514 BC clashed against the armies of Darius I of Persia.

Before he reached the Istrus he first subdued the Getae who believed themselves immortal. In fact, the Thracians occupying the city of Salmydessus and inhabiting beyond Apollonia and the city of Mesambria, called Scirmiades and Nipsei, had surrendered without a fight to Darius: instead, the Getae turned to stubborn resistance, but were immediately subdued, despite being the most valiant and the most righteous of the Thracians.

— Herodotus, Historiae, IV, 93.

In 334 BC, the Getae were attacked and soundly beaten by the Macedonian armies of Alexander the Great, for they had allied themselves with the neighboring Triballi, who in previous years had carried out several raids against the Macedonia of Philip, father of the great Macedonian leader. Alexander passed Mount Hemo, pursued them and forced the Triballi into battle near the mouth of the Lyginus River near the Danube. Once beaten, their king, Sirmus, found refuge on the island along the Danube, of Peuce (now Peuke). The Macedonian leader, determined to give these peoples a show of strength, ferried across the Danube river, moved with his armies into Oltenia, and, clashing against an army of 10,000 infantrymen and 4,000 Getae horsemen, succeeded in beating them and subduing these peoples inhabiting ancient Dacia.

In 326 BC, the fortunes were reversed, and this time the Getae succeeded in beating the Macedonian armies, commanded by the general named Zopyrion, on the Gotic steppe south of Bessarabia. The Macedonian general, while returning from the failed siege of the city Olbia on the Black Sea, met his death along with an army of as many as 30,000 soldiers. The Getae had thus succeeded, eight years later, in avenging their previous defeat.

Around 300 BC, the new king of the Thracians, Lysimachus (306-281 BC), decided to invade and annex the Getaean territories of Wallachia north of the Danube. He entrusted his armies to his son Agathocles, who, however, was beaten and taken prisoner by the Getaean king Dromichaites, who was eventually persuaded to let the Thracian king's son go free in the hope that relations between the two peoples would improve. Lysimachus, in spite of the geta king's soothing gesture decided, on the contrary, to invade the enemy country again, meeting with fresh failure. The Thracian king, in fact, was again defeated and taken prisoner, and only thanks to the indulgence of the king of the Getae was he allowed to live and set free. The Getae, however, this time succeeded in obtaining advantageous terms in the newly concluded peace treaty, achieving a solid bond between the two peoples, thanks in part to the marriage between Dromichaites and Lysimachus' daughter.

During the 3rd-2nd century BC, news becomes scarcer. However, a few conflicts between the kings of the Getae and the Greek colony of Histria on the Black Sea (south of the mouth of the Danube river) are known, where the latter paid the consequences of the clash so severely that it was forced to pay regular tribute to the kings of the Getae (episodes in 250 BC and 180 BC). And again in 168 BC, Perseus of Macedon attempted to hire as many as 10,000 foot soldiers and as many horsemen from among the Getae. However, the exaggerated cost demanded by the Transdanubian mercenaries, a total of 150,000 gold pieces, deprived the Macedonian king's army of a sizable allied force that was crucial to the impending clash with the Romans near Pydna.

Literary sources begin to mention the Dacians, as a population inhabiting, from the beginning of the second century BC, the interior of the Carpathian mountain arc. In fact, Pompeius Trogus tells of the conflict that led the then Dacian king, Oroles, to beat back and repel an incursion of Bastarnae Germans, who had attempted to penetrate from the east, into the fertile plains of the middle reaches of the Mureș river. A new conflict with the Bastarnae occurred in 112-109 BC, but again they were repulsed, failing to weaken the power of the Dacians, which on the contrary increased, so much so that it is precisely at this time that we can discern the shift of the Daco-Getic power center from the plains of Wallachia to the heart of Transylvania.

== The kingdom of Dacia in the first century BC: Burebista and the Romans ==
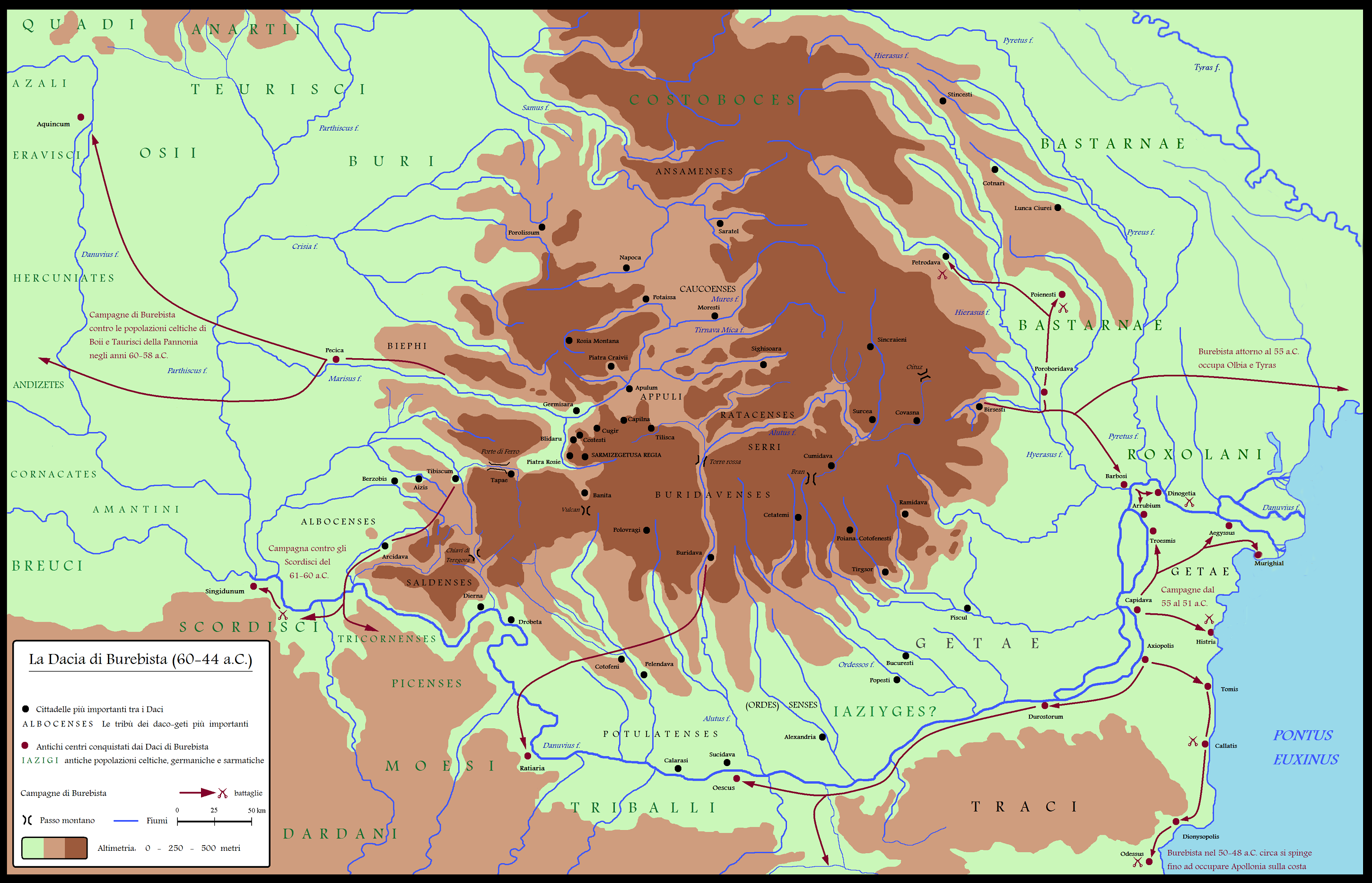
Burebista's Dacia (60-44 BC)

It was with the beginning of the new century that the Romans, busy fighting Scordisci and Dardanians, came to clash with their allies as well: the Dacians. Indeed, Florus recounts that in 74 BC, the governor of Macedonia, Gaius Scribonius Curio, after defeating the Dardanians (for whose victory he deserved a triumph), "came as far as Dacia, but retreated frightened before the thick shadows of its forests." He was perhaps the first among Roman generals to penetrate Dacia once he crossed the Danube.

In the first half of the first century BC, a state arose on the territory of ancient Dacia, the main center of which was located in the southern Carpathians of Transylvania, in the area of the Orăștie massif, coming to encompass at the time of its greatest expansion the entire Dacian-Getic lineage. The formation of this early Dacian state was enhanced especially under the enlightened leadership of King Burebista, a contemporary of Gaius Julius Caesar, who restructured the internal order, completely reorganized the army (which Strabo reports could field as many as 200,000 armed men), so much so as to raise the morale of these people, and expanded the limits of the kingdom to their highest peak.

This progress led to a significant demographic increase in the Dacian population, so much so that the number of settlements grew with great rapidity, and a number of new settlements sprang up during this period: from Popești to Cetățeni, Piatra Neamț, Pecica, Piatra Craivii, Capilna, Costești, and on to Tilișca. Of these newly established settlements, Costești, Piatra Craivii, and Capilna were fortified and located right in the center of the new state of Burebista. Other older sites, such as Răcătău and Slimnic expanded their area and population wealth, thanks to recent archaeological finds of various utensils.

Underlying this development was certainly the progress in ironworking, but also the use of squared stone as a building material, agricultural progress (with iron plowshares for plows), mining (gold and silver in particular), carpentry (with the clearing of areas near settlements), and pottery (for which the potter's wheel was introduced). Along with the development of the productive forces of the new Dacian state, trade with neighboring countries also intensified, in particular numerous finely crafted Hellenistic-style objects were imported from the nearby Greek colonies on the Black Sea, such as vases, metal mirrors, bronze objects, amphorae, etc., and the minting of geto-dacian-style coins intensified (between 200 and 80 BC).

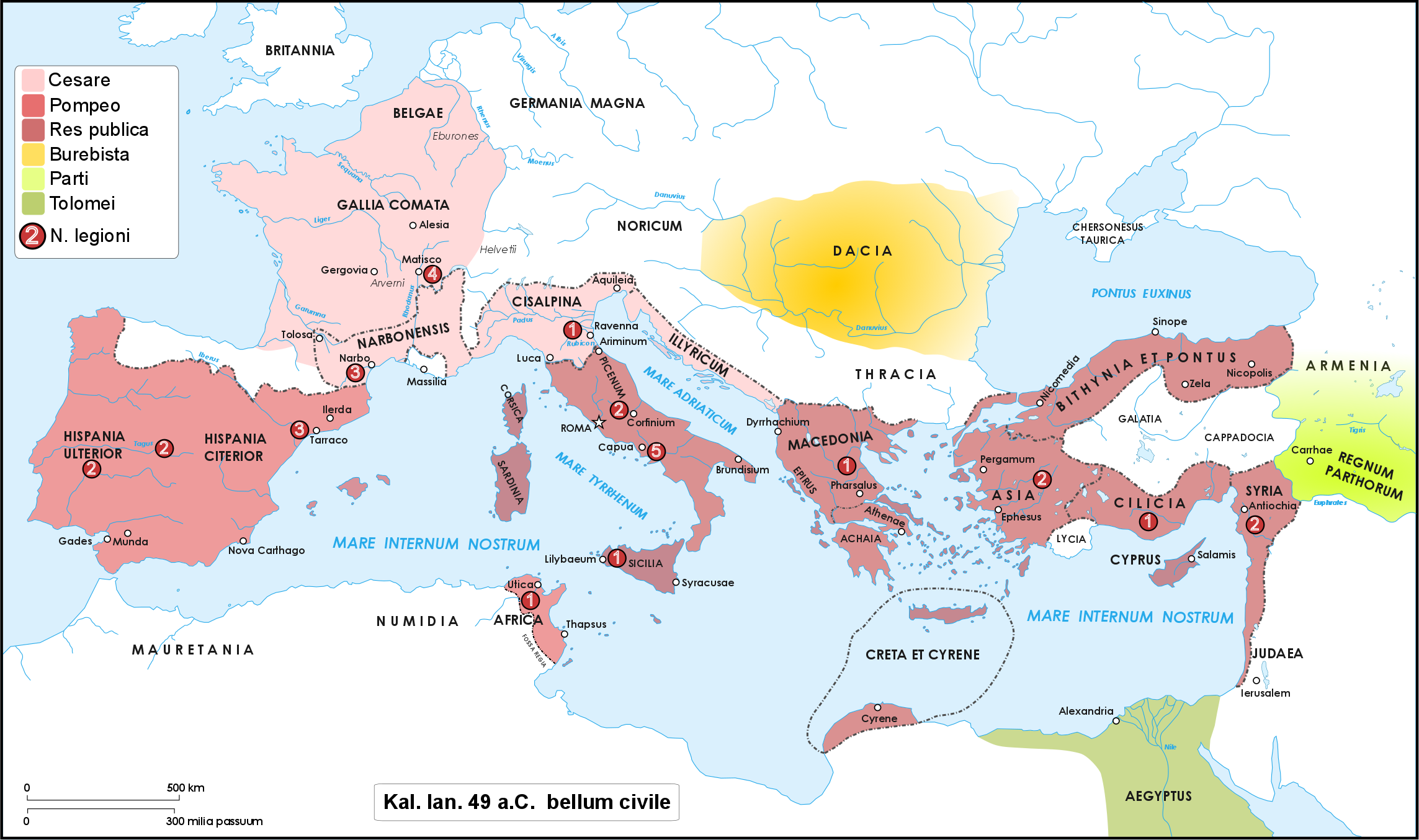
The Roman world and the Dacian kingdom of Burebista in 49 BC at the outbreak of the Roman civil war

Burebista, after reorganizing the state internally, reformed the army, creating a complex and solid system of fortifications in the Orăștie Mountains, around the capital, Sarmizegetusa Regia, and the center of the new state. In addition, the population increase and increased military strength led to a whole series of campaigns conducted in the years c. 60-48 BC:

- in 61-60 BC, the Dacian king turned toward Illyria and subdued the Scordisci people of the lower Sava river valley.
- in 60-59 BC he subdued the entire Tisza river plain, taking his armies as far as Lake Balaton in present-day Hungary, and perhaps as far as the Morava river, subduing the territories of Pannonia and putting the Celtic peoples of the Boii and Taurisci on the run. The result was that in 58 BC the Boii, who fled after the defeat, joined the migration of the Helvetians westward, which Gaius Julius Caesar succeeded in blocking in Gaul, while the Taurisci were forced to migrate to Noricum.
- around 55 BC he turned his armies eastward and after repeatedly defeating the Bastarnae Germans, he succeeded in occupying the Greek colonies on the coast of Pontus Euxinus, starting with Olbia on the Bug river, then fell Tyras on the Dniester river, later Histria (in Dobruja), Tomi, Odessos, Mesembria and Apollonia.
- around the years 50-48 BC Burebista expanded his conquests to the foothills of the Balkan Mountains.

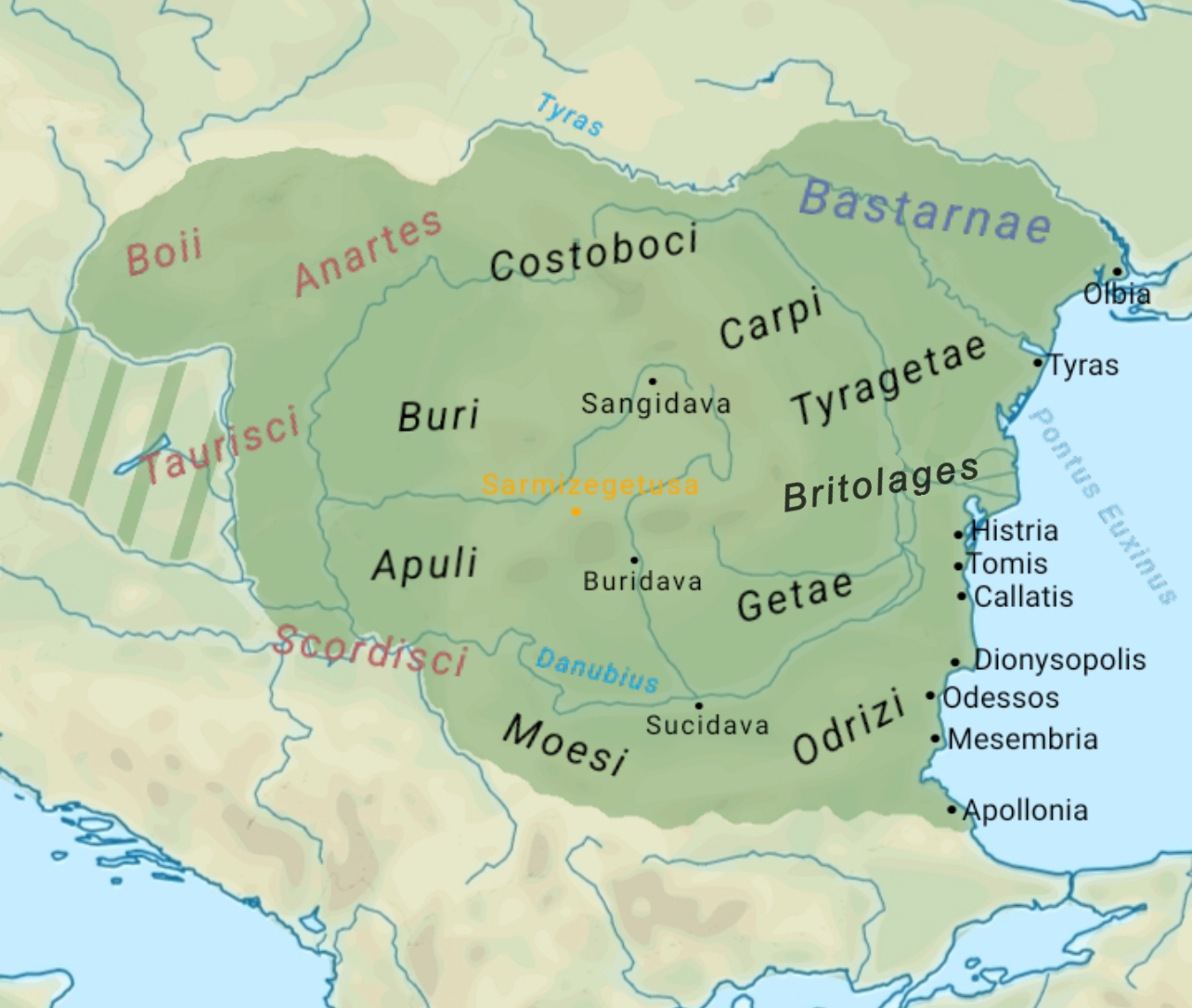
Dacian kingdom around 50 BC.

It is said that during the civil war between Caesar and Pompey, he attempted to take advantage of the situation by sending ambassadors to Pompey, to whom he would promise his military aid, in return probably for recognition of his conquests along the right bank of the Danube. However, before he could officially ally himself with the latter, Caesar succeeded in defeating Pompey at Pharsalus in 48 BC, thwarting any possible alliance of the Dacian king. On the contrary, it highlighted how dangerous the new kingdom formed in Transylvania could be for Rome.

The Dacians, in fact, after the successes of the last decade, appeared so formidable in the eyes of the Romans that Caesar himself had planned an expedition against them (perhaps also in revenge for the discourtesy suffered during the Civil War), which did not, however, take place because of the death of the Roman dictator on the Ides of March in 44 BC.

...Caesar conceived the idea of a long campaign against the Getae (meaning the Dacians of Burebista) and the Parthians. The Getae are a war-loving nation and a neighboring nation, who were to be attacked first, the Parthians were to be punished for the perfidy employed against Crassus.

— Appian, Civil War, II, 110.

And almost at the same time, Burebista was also assassinated, the victim of a plot by part of the tribal aristocracy, and the kingdom divided into four (or perhaps five) parts, ruled by different rulers. The powerful Dacian kingdom thus lost the power of the last two decades, and was certainly less dangerous to the neighboring Roman Empire. This allowed Rome to "shelve", for the time being, the Dacian danger for over a century, until Domitian-Trajan. Thanks mainly to Jordanes and other ancient literary sources, the succession of Dacian kings after the death of Burebista is known:

- in Transylvania, with Deceneus (Burebista's collaborator) perhaps from 44 to 27 BC, then Comosicus, Corillus (who reigned for as many as 40 years), some kings whose names are not known, then again Scorilus (father of Decebalus) around the 1860s, Duras-Diurpaneus (perhaps brother of Scorilus, who reigned probably from 68-69 to 87) and finally Decebalus (from 87 to 106);
- in the Wallachian plain Dicomes (at the time of the Battle of Actium in 31 BC), who may have been succeeded by Coson;
- in Banat and Oltenia, Cotiso from the time of Augustus;
- in Dobruja, Rholes, then Dapyx and finally Zyraxes.

It seems, finally, that although the unity of Dacia shattered with the death of Burebista, during the first century it went on to recompose itself around the central core of the Orăștie Mountains, although it never lost the religious unity of all its Geto-Dacian peoples.

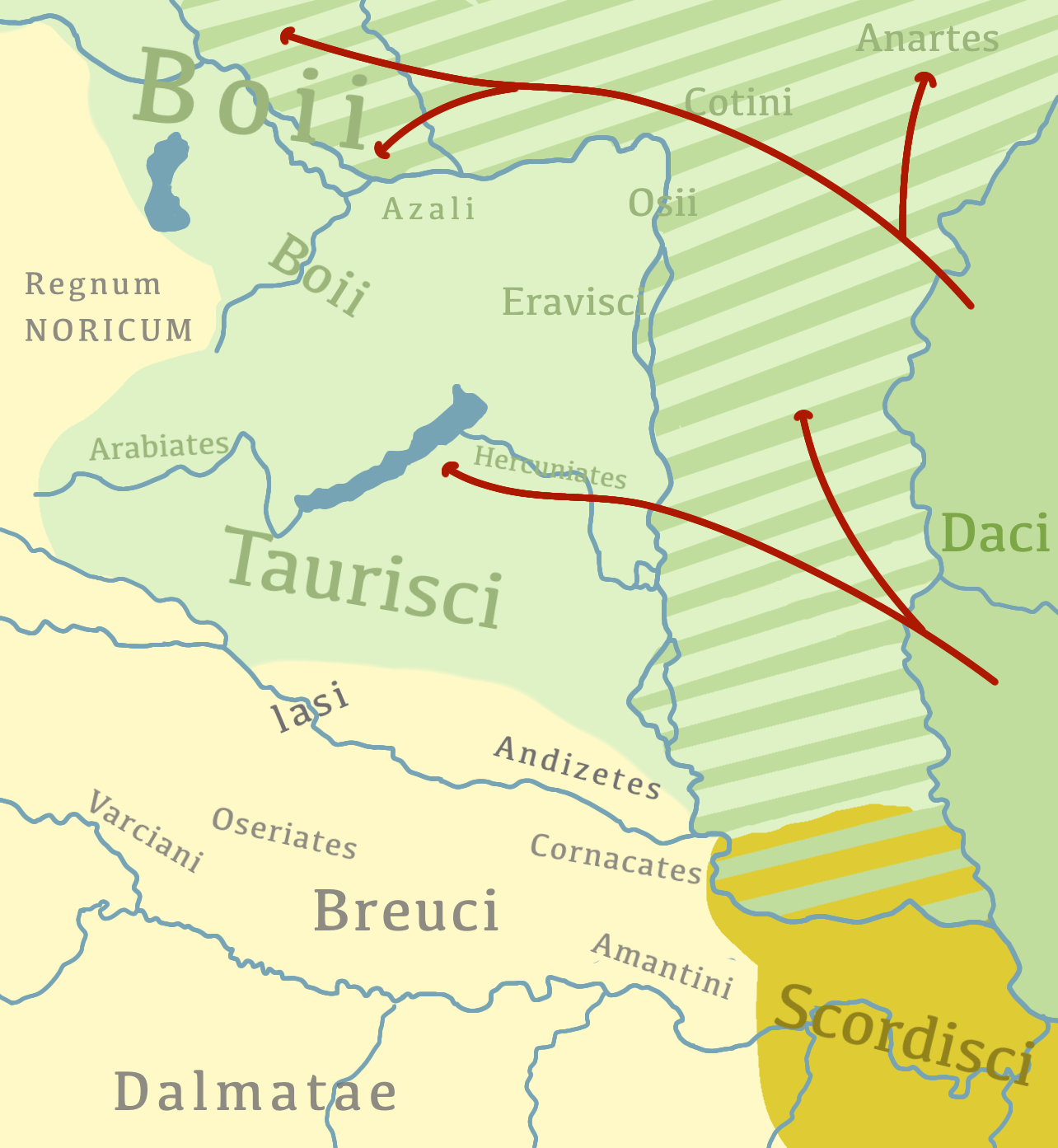
The map that shows a hypothetical reconstruction of the Dacian confrontation with the Boii and Taurisci.

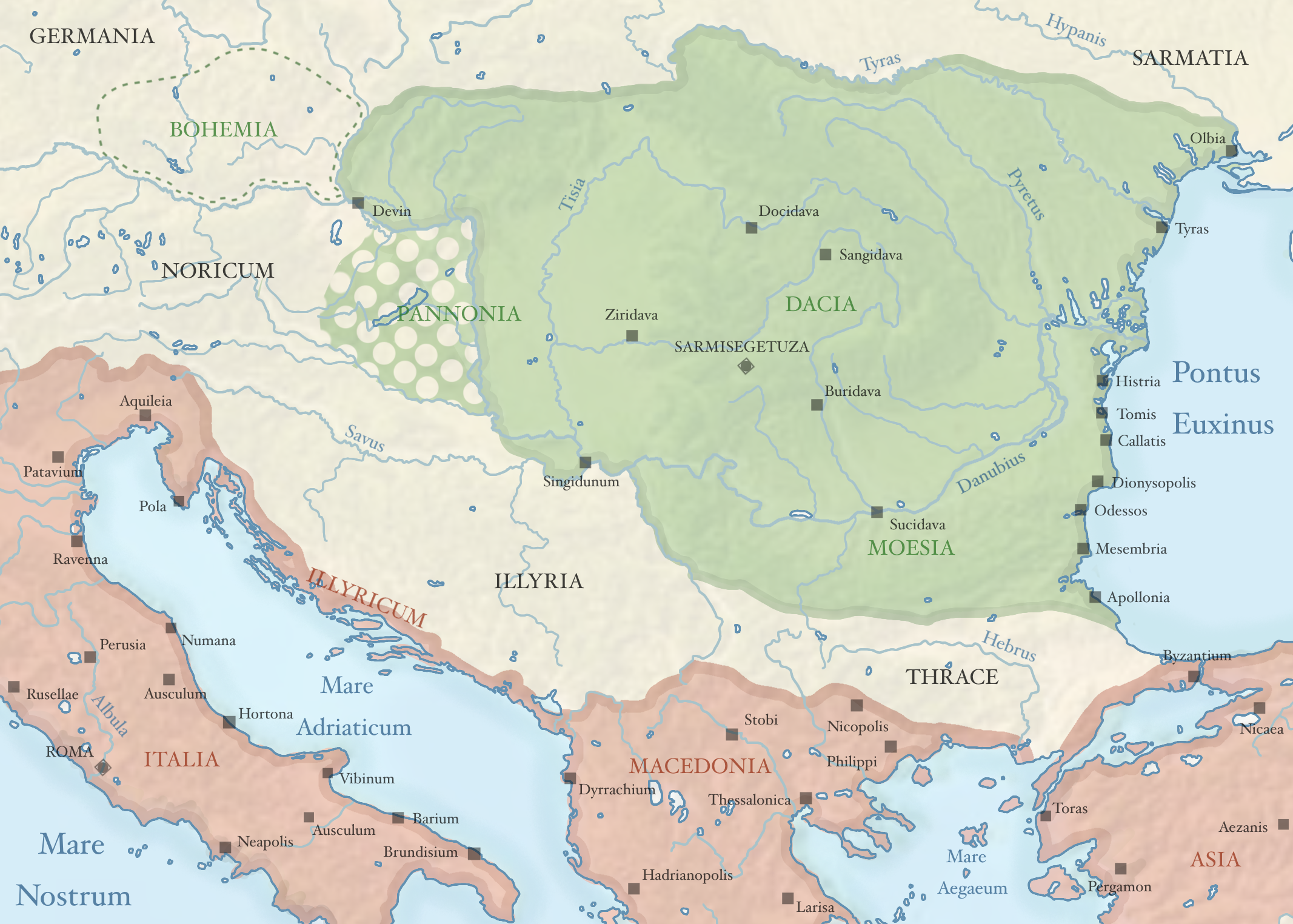
Map depicting the Dacian Kingdom during its peak and the Roman Republic.

== Dacia in the context of the balance of the neighbouring Roman empire: from Burebista to the Flavians (44 BC-84 AD) ==
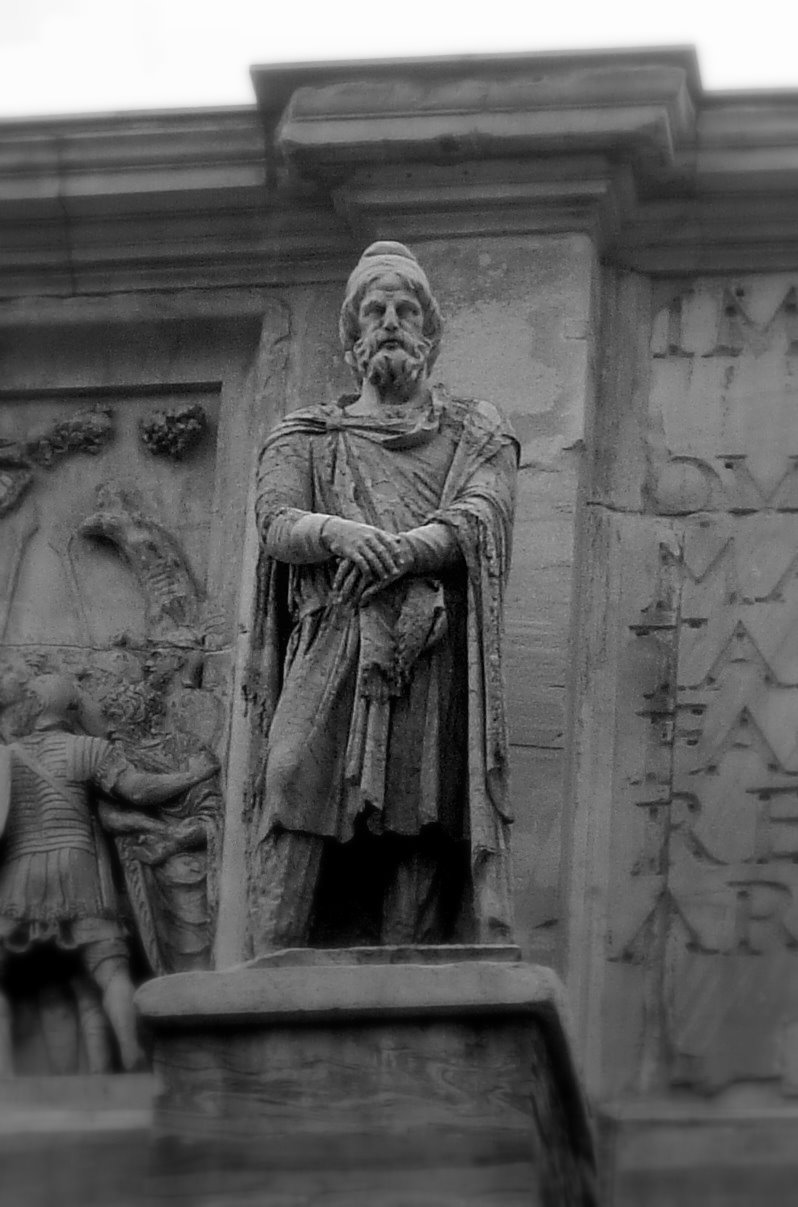
Dacian warrior of the Arch of Constantine, from Trajan's Forum

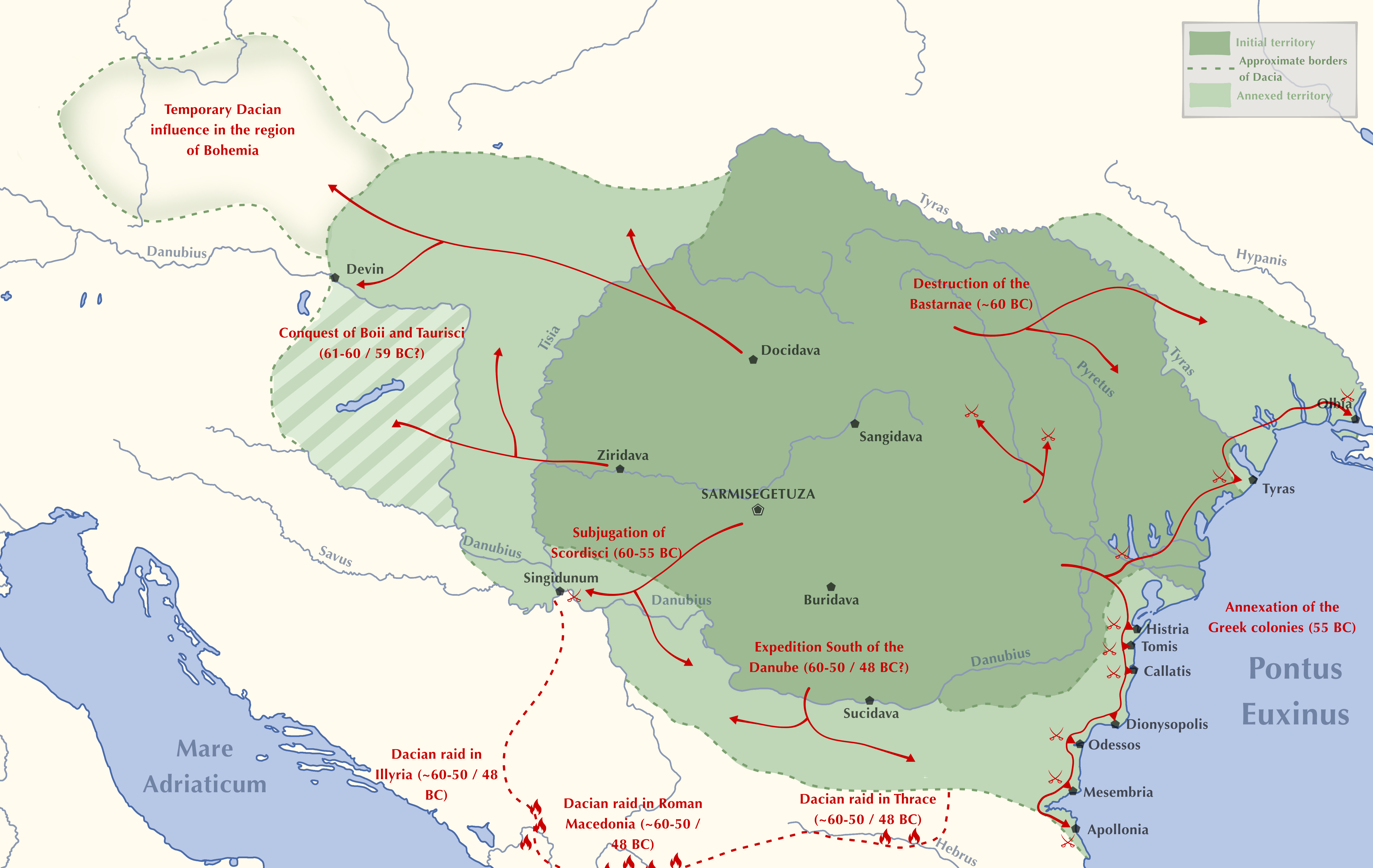
Burebista’s campaigns and territorial expansions, encompassing his original lands, conquered regions, and areas under his sphere of influence.

One of the new rulers after the dissolution of the great Burebista kingdom was Cotiso, who betrothed his daughter to the emperor Augustus, obtaining his five-year-old daughter, Julia, as his betrothed in return.

Octavian's strategy in 35 BC, who was preparing to occupy much of the upper and middle reaches of the Sava River and intended to make the fortress of Siscia an outpost for eventual campaigns in the east against the powerful and fearsome Dacians and Bastarnae. A few years later, in 28 BC, the newly appointed governor of Macedonia, Marcus Licinius Crassus, beat the geto-dacians of Dobruja, in a punitive campaign because they were harassing, along with the Bastarnae, the Thracian peoples with whom Rome had made a treaty of alliance and threatening the province itself.

New and successive incursions of the Dacians across the Danube were repelled from time to time by the Roman armies, as Dio tells in 10 BC, when "the Dacians, after crossing the frozen Istrus, raided Pannonia, while the Dalmatians rebelled against the exactions of tribute." The Roman reaction led to marches against them and their Bastarnae allies, the legions of the then governor of Macedonia, Marcus Vinicius in 9 BC, as reported in an inscription found in Tusculum, near Frascati, which reads:

Marcus Vinicius Publi filius consul XVvir sacris faciundis praetor quaestor legatus propraetore Augusti Caesaris in Illyrico primus trans flumen Danivium progressus Dacorum et Basternarum exercitum acie vicit fugavitque Cotinos Osos (...)s et Anartios sub potestatem Imperatoris Caesaris Augusti et populi Romani redegit
"Marcus Vinicius, son of Publius, held the office of Consul, fifteenth holy man, Praetor, Quaestor, Legate Augustus proprector (i.e., governor) in Illyricum, first to have crossed the Danube river, led an army against the ranks of Dacians and Bastarnae, which he defeated, and also beat Cotini, Osii, (. ..) (was it the Boii Celts? or the Eravisci?) and Anartii and brought them under the rule of Augustus and the Roman people."

— AE 1895, 122

Again in 6 AD when they forced Aulus Caecina Severus, in the midst of the Dalmatian-Pannonian revolt, to retreat to Moesia, since the Dacians and Sarmatians (probably the Iazyges) were ravaging its territories, while Tiberius lingered in Scythia.

Augustus, as a result of their constant looting that occurred whenever the frozen Danube bridged its streams, decided to send against them some of his proven generals such as Sextus Aelius Catus and Gnaeus Cornelius Lentulus Augur (sometime between AD 1-11). Aelius Catus, at the end of his military campaign led 50,000 Getae south of the Danube, while Lentulus beat them back, pushed them back across the Danube, and placed numerous garrisons on the right bank of the great river to defend against possible and future incursions.

Eventually the Dacians were forced to recognize Roman supremacy in the Balkan area, although they had not yet been subjugated to Rome, as Suetonius and the emperor Augustus himself tells:

Augustus had succeeded (during his principate) in curbing the incursions of the Dacians, making a great slaughter of them and killing three of their leaders

— Suetonius, The Twelve Caesars, Augustus, 21.

...an army of Dacians, passed over this side of it, under my auspices was vanquished and routed, and afterwards my army, led across the Danube, forced the people of the Dacians to submit to the commands of the Roman people.

— Augustus, Res gestae divi Augusti, 30.

Subsequent attacks, the first by the Getae in 15, the second by the Dacians some fifteen years later, forced Emperor Tiberius to promote the displacement around 20 AD of the Iazygian Sarmatians in what is now the northern Hungarian plain along the course of the Tisza river (east of the Danube), resulting in the expulsion of the Dacians from these territories.

At an unspecified time, but nevertheless between 57 and 67, the consul of 45, the governor of Moesia, Tiberius Plautius Silvanus Aelianus, crossed the Danube and transferred 100,000 Transdanubians (among them certainly some Getae), including women, children and their kings, to Roman territory, ordering them to pay tribute to the Empire.

In 69, the Dacians of Duras-Diurpaneo attacked the borders of Moesia along the lower reaches of the Danube, besieging both legionary castra of Viminacium and Oescus, as the legions of Upper Moesia had been withdrawn to fight alongside Vespasian in the new civil war for the imperial purple. It was by sheer luck that General Mucianus, from Syria, marching westward with a legion (Legio VI Ferrata) for the Flavian cause, beat the Dacians in Moesia and repelled their invasion.

== The prelude to the great clash with the Romans: Decebalus vs. Domitian (85-89 AD). ==
Although during the first century CE the Dacians had taken every opportunity to cross the frozen Danube in winter and plunder Roman cities in the province of Moesia, it was only under Domitian that Rome sought to solve the Dacian problem, even at the cost of annexing the entire Carpathian area. Dacia had, in fact, once again become an inconvenient power for the neighboring Roman Empire. Its military and economic strength had increased enormously, returning to the former glory of Burebista times.

From 85 to 89, the Dacians, commanded first by King Duras-Diurpaneus, and from 86 by the new king Decebalus, fought two wars against the Romans.

- In 85 the Dacians, having gathered a mighty army, crossed the Danube and swept into the Roman province of Moesia, where only one legion was stationed, led by governor Gaius Oppius Sabinus, who was killed. Domitian then entrusted the command of the war and the Roman troops to Cornelius Fuscus, prefect of the praetorium, himself going to the theater of operations, but taking no part in it. The Dacians, in an attempt to lure the Romans into a trap, re-crossed the river, but Domitian returned to Italy.
- In 86 Cornelius Fusco crossed the Danube and entered enemy territory. He was attacked by surprise and killed.
- In 88 new Roman troops, commanded by the governor of Upper Moesia, Tettius Julianus, achieved victory at the Battle of Tapae in Transylvania. In the same year, abetted by the revolt of Saturninus, legatus of Germania Superior who had proclaimed himself emperor and allied himself with the Chatti against the emperor, Domitian was forced to remove the legions from Dacia to fall back against insubordination; to do so, he had to enter into a peace "at all costs" with Decebalus, who dictated his own terms: gold and silver to be repaid for his losses, the retreat of the Roman legions across the Danube, and the aid of Roman engineers and architects to fortify the walls of his own cities.

== Trajan's Roman Conquest (101-106) ==
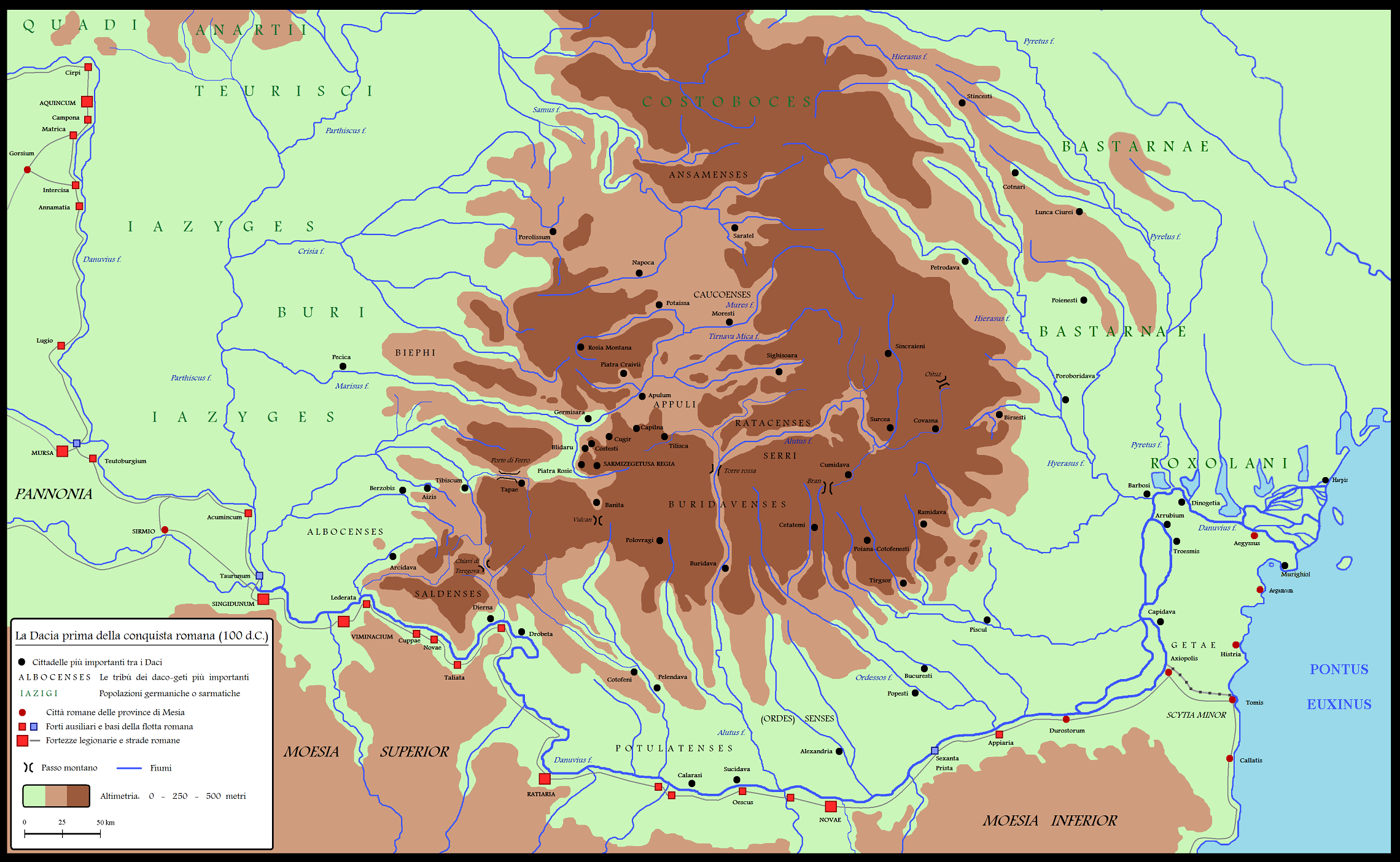
Dacia before the Roman conquest.

Concerned by the growing power of the Dacian state, Trajan decided to put an end to the previous and disgraceful agreement signed by Domitian (perhaps also to restore the finances of the Roman Empire with the capture of the famous treasure of Decebalus), and to conquer Dacia, thus gaining control over the gold mines of Transylvania.

The result of the first campaign (101-102) was the siege of the Dacian capital Sarmizegetusa Regia and the occupation of part of its territory. The second campaign (105-106) ended with the suicide of Decebalus, and the conquest of the territory that would form the new Roman province of Dacia. The history of the war was written by Emperor Trajan himself in a sort of Commentarii on the example of Caesar, which have been lost. On these commentaries the Senate ordered that they be forever etched in stone by the depictions carved on Trajan's Column in Rome.

The Roman province of Dacia occupied present-day Transylvania, Banat, and Oltenia. The Romans built forts to protect themselves from attacks by Roxolani, Alans, Carpi and free Dacians (from parts of Banat and Wallachia), as well as three new major military roads to join the main cities. A fourth road, subsequent to Trajan, crossed the Carpathians and entered Transylvania from the Turnu Roșu pass.

The Dacians in the Roman territories adopted the religion and language of the conquerors and the present Romanian language is a Romance language confirming an early Romanization of these territories.

Dacia, to which Trajan had given a new capital, Ulpia Traiana Sarmizegetusa, also allowed for a single assembly that discussed provincial affairs, communicated the grievances of those who were discontented, and calculated the distribution of taxation. Each was, however, under the control of an ordinary procurator, subordinate to a governor of consular rank.

== Roman retreat ==
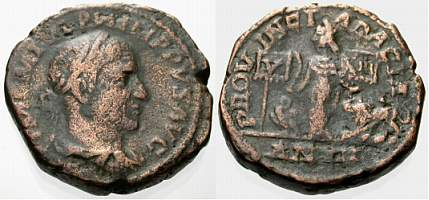
Sestertius minted to celebrate the province of Dacia and its legions, V Macedonica and XIII Gemina.

The Roman possession of Dacia was very precarious; Hadrian, aware of the difficulty in maintaining it, apparently contemplated abandoning it, and was discouraged only by the large number of settlers now transferred by Trajan and the rich gold and silver mines.

It seems that already under the empire of Gallienus (256) the Goths crossed the Carpathians, driving the Romans out of the northern part of the province of Dacia. Twenty years later, Emperor Aurelian sanctioned the final abandonment of Dacia and the withdrawal of his troops, setting the empire's new frontier on the Danube (in 271-275). In Moesia and Thrace the new province of Aurelian Dacia was reorganized, with its capital Serdica (today Sofia, capital of Bulgaria). The immediate consequences of the Roman abandonment of the Carpathian basin generated not only new tensions between the Goths and Gepids on the one hand (in the east) and the Iazygian Sarmatians on the other (in the west), coming into contact with each other, but also allowed the borders of the lower-middle Danube to be strengthened with the withdrawal of two entire legions (Legio V Macedonica and Legio XIII Gemina, now positioned in Oescus and Ratiaria) and a substantial number of auxiliary units, for a combined total of more than 45. 000 armed men.

Later, Diocletian and Constantine reorganized the provinces into Dacia Mediterranea, Moesia Inferior, Dardania, Praevalitania and Dacia Ripensis into dioceses of Dacia, which together with Macedonia formed the prefecture of Illyricum.

== Post-Roman history ==
After the retreat of the Romans, the ancient province of Dacia Traiana was invaded by the Goths and Carpi. Archaeological findings in recent decades, however, have been showing that there was a persistence and continuity of the Daco-Roman population in Dacia after the departure of the administrative bodies of the province. It also seems that the spread of the Latin-speaking Christian religion into the Carpatho-Balkan area, as well as the continuous coming and going of transhumance of the shepherds in the area between the Carpathians and the Danube, where Roman cities still stood, not only safeguarded the romanitas of the region, but also the language itself.

It seems that Constantine I, born in Dacia Aureliana, assumed the title of Dacicus and began the construction or renovation of a whole series of bridges across the Danube in Dacia Traiana. The strip of land north of the Danube, at least in Oltenia and parts of the Wallachian plain, was still subjected to Roman rule, as is well attested by the system of fortifications of the "Brazda lui Novac du Nord," built between 330 and 340, and which on several occasions was activated until under Justinian in the 6th century.

According to Lactantius Emperor Galerius, who was also born in Dacia Aureliana, and whose mother was from Dacia Traiana, proposed that the Eastern Roman Empire be called the Dacian Empire.

In the years following 376 the Germanic tribes of the Goths were pushed into the Eastern Roman Empire by the arrival of the armies of the Huns, who dominated the region until the dissolution of Attila's great empire with his death in 453. After this date new peoples took over the region: first the Gepids, who together with the Goths had been vassals of the Huns for almost a century, then the Avars in the late 6th century (starting around 587), and finally the Slavs, at least in the southern part of Wallachia (to a branch of which the Bulgarians belong).

What happened to the resident population after the withdrawal of the Roman legions is still debated. Archaeological findings testify that the inhabitants of the ancient Roman province continued to reside in the territory slowly assimilating even the free Dacians who had not yet been romanized, alongside constantly migrating peoples for the next centuries. In fact, after the migration of the Goths and Carpi new infiltrations by groups of Sarmatian shepherds followed, who, penetrating the eastern plains of Wallachia, managed to coexist with the native peoples. This theory was for years supported by Romanian historians, contrary to Hungarian historians, who believed there had been a migration of the entire Daco-Roman people along with the displacement of retreating troops, only to return to the territory after the end of the barbarian invasions. The two different hypotheses had mainly political implications: in the first case, in fact, the Romanians wanted to claim a continuity of presence in the territory dating back to before the Roman conquest, while in the second case the Magyars who conquered Transylvania defeated some local and non-Daco-Roman rulers such as Gelou, Glad and Menumorut.

== See also ==
- Dacians
- Getae
- Roman Dacia
- Burebista
- Decebalus
- Domitian
- Augustus

== Bibliography ==
- Appian. Civil War, II and The Wars in Illyricum.
- Augustus. Res gestae divi Augusti, 30.
- Caesar. De bello Gallico, VI.
- Dio. Roman History, LIV-LV.
- Herodotus. Histories, IV, 93-94.
- Florus. Epitome of Roman history, I-II.
- Jordanes. De origine actibusque Getarum.
- Horace. Carmen saeculare, III.
- Plutarch. Parallel Lives, Alexander the Great.
- Pompey Trogus. Historiae Philippicae.
- Strabo. Geography, VII.
- Suetonius. The Twelve Caesars.
- Tacitus. Historiae, III-IV.
- AAVV. I Daci: mostra della civiltà daco-getica in epoca classica, December 1979-January 1980. Rome.
- AAVV. Dacia - Revue d'archéologie et d'histoire ancienne (1957-1961).
- AAVV (1982). La Dacia pre-romana e romana, i rapporti con l'Impero, Vol. 52, Atti dei convegni dell'Accademia Nazionale dei Lincei.
- AAVV (1997). Arbore Popescu, Grigore (ed.). I Daci. Milan: Electa.
- AAVV (1998). Arbore Popescu, Grigore (ed.). Traiano: ai confini dell'Impero. Milan: Electa.
- Radu Ardevan & Livio Zerbini (2007). La Dacia romana. Soveria Mannelli: Rubettino.
- Julian Bennet (2001). Trajan, Optimus Princeps. Bloomington: Routledge.
- Condurachi, Emile; Daicoviciu, Constantin (1975). Archeologia Mundi: Romania.
- Fritz, J. J.Fritz, Reale Enciclopadie, Stoccarda 1894, suppl. IX.
- Grant, Michael (1996). The Antonines: the roman empire in transition. London and New York: Routledge.
- W. Jones, Brian (1993). The emperor Domitian. London and New York: Routledge.
- Luttwak (1981). La grande Strategia dell'Impero romano. Milan: Rizzoli.
- Mócsy, András (1974). Pannonia and Upper Moesia. London: Routledge.
- Nardoni, Davide (1986). La colonna Ulpia Traiana. Rome: Edizioni italiane di letteratura e scienze.
- Ioana A.Oltean (2007). Dacia, landscape, colonisation, romanisation. New York: Routledge.
- Siegert, Heinz (1986). I Traci. Milan: Garzanti.
- Southern, Pat (1997). Domitian, tragic tyrant. London and New York: Routledge.
- Syme, R. (1971). Danubian Papers. London: Association Internationale D'Etudes Du Sud-Est Europeen.
- Wachtel, K. in XI Congress of Roman frontier studies of 1976, Zum Militarkommando an der unteren Donau in Augusteischer zeit.
- Wilcox, Peter; Embleton, Gerry (2004). Rome's enemies: Germans and Dacians. Oxford: Osprey Publishing.
