= Duras (Dacian king) =

1st-century king of Dacia

- King of Dacia
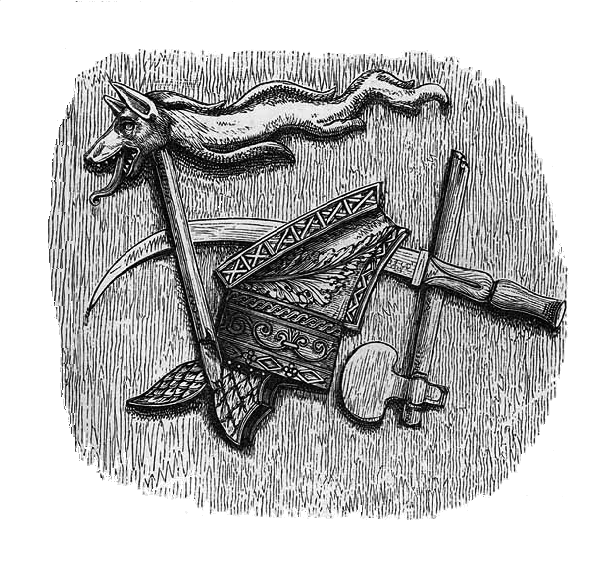
- Symbols of the Dacian kingdom
- Reign: c. 69-87 AD
- Predecessor: Scorilo
- Successor: Decebalus

Duras (ruled c. 69–87), also known as Duras-Diurpaneus, was king of the Dacians between maybe AD 69 and 87, during the time that Domitian ruled the Roman Empire. Duras' immediate successor was Decebalus.

== Duras and Diurpaneus ==
Duras is mentioned in the Constantinian Excerpts, a Byzantine text collection that quotes the Roman historian Cassius Dio in the relevant passages.

Duras may be identical to the "Diurpaneus" (or "Dorpaneus") identified in Roman sources as the Dacian leader who, in the winter of 85, ravaged the southern banks of the Danube, which the Romans defended for many years. Many authors refer to him as "Duras-Diurpaneus". Other scholars argue that Duras and Diurpaneus are different individuals, or that Diurpaneus is identical to Decebalus.

In Jordanes' king-list Dorpaneus succeeds "Coryllus". This name is sometimes hypothesized to be a corruption of Scorilo, another Dacian leader mentioned in Roman sources.

== War with Rome ==
Dacian power was expanding in the decennia in which Duras may have reigned, spreading to Slovakia, Moldavia, and Wallachia. A Dacian raid into the Roman province of Moesia in 69 was pushed back by Licinius Mucianus.

The Roman governor of Moesia, Gaius Oppius Sabinus, raised an army and went to war with the Dacians following the Dacian (Getae) raids into Roman territory. Diurpaneus and his people defeated and decapitated Oppius Sabinus. When news of the defeat reached Rome, the citizens became fearful that the conquering enemy would invade and spread destruction further into the Empire. Because of this fear, Domitian was obliged to move with his entire army into Illyria and Moesia, the latter of which was now split into Upper and Lower regions. He ordered his commander Cornelius Fuscus to cross the Danube.

The Dacians were pushed back across the Danube, but Fuscus suffered a crushing defeat when ambushed by "Diurpaneus". At this point, the probably elderly Duras seems to have ceded power to Decebalus. Duras' concession of leadership was made peacefully. He continued to live in one of the palaces in Sarmizegetusa while serving as an advisor to Decebalus.

== See also ==
- Domitian's Dacian War

== Bibliography ==
- Brodersen, Kai (2020). Dacia felix: Das antike Rumänien im Brennpunkt der Kulturen. Darmstadt: wbg. ISBN 978-3-8053-5059-4.
