= Diegis =

1st century Dacian chief, general and brother of Decebalus

Diegis was a Dacian chief, general and brother of Decebalus. He served as his representative at the peace negotiations held with Domitian in 89 AD. After the peace negotiation, Domitian placed a diadem upon Diegis' head, symbolically saying that he held the power to bestow kingship to the Dacians. Maybe Domitian wanted to fuel a power struggle among the Dacians between Decebalus and Diegis in this way. According to Gábor Vékony, Decebalus never held the royal title.
