= Rock sculpture of Decebalus =

Colossal carving in Mehedinți County, Romania

Coordinates: 44°38′28″N 22°17′29″E

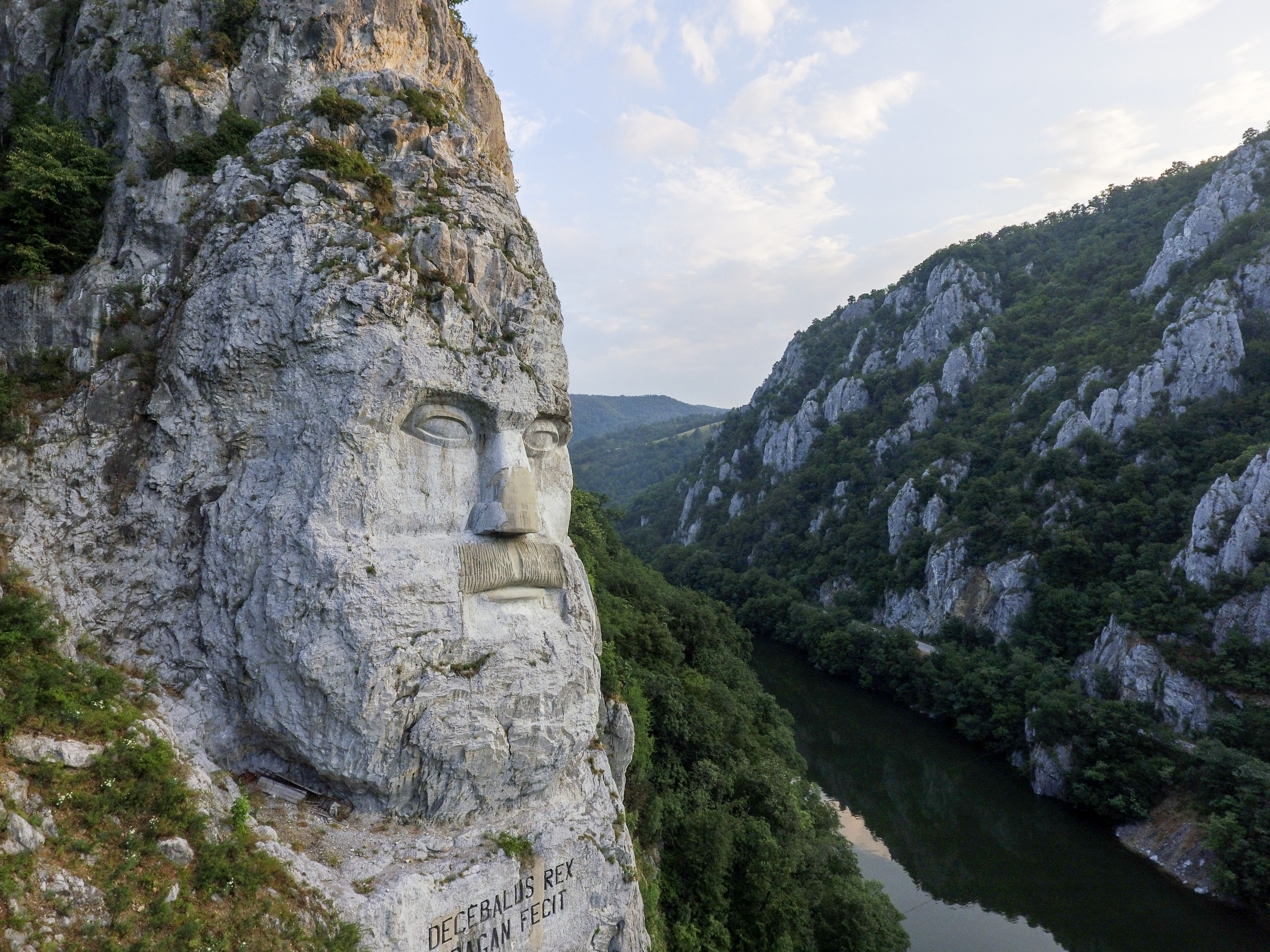
Side view

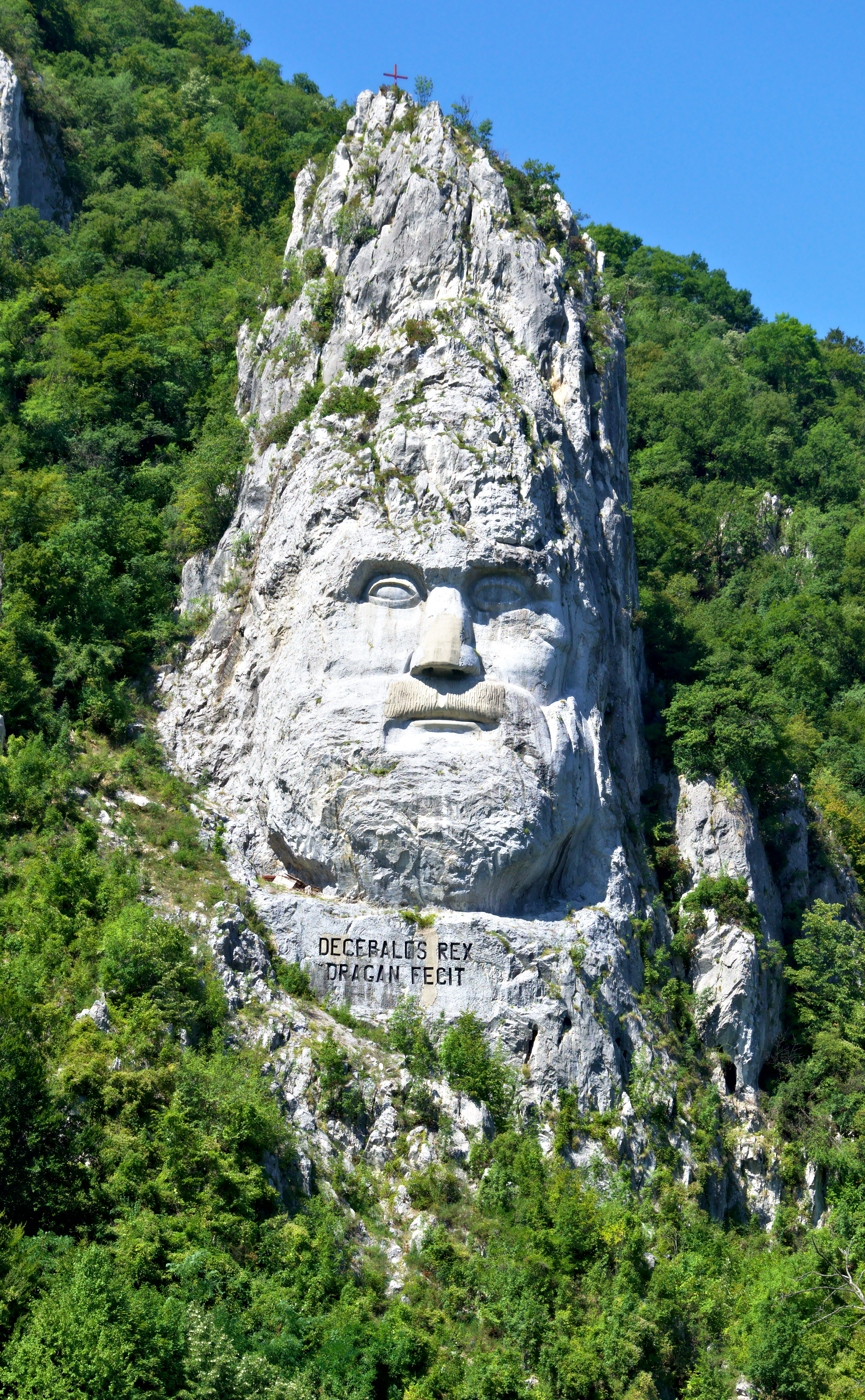
Full frontal view

The rock sculpture of Decebalus (Romanian: Chipul regelui dac Decebal) is a colossal carving of the face of Decebalus (r. AD 87–106), the last king of Dacia, who fought against the Roman emperors Domitian and Trajan.

The sculpture is located near the city of Orșova, in Mehedinți County. It was made between 1994 and 2004, on a rocky outcrop on the river Danube, at the Iron Gates, which form the border between Romania and Serbia. The Dacian king's sculpture is the tallest rock relief in Europe, at 55 m (180 ft) in height and 25 m (82 ft) in width.

== Creation ==
It was commissioned by Romanian businessman Iosif Constantin Drăgan and it took 10 years for twelve sculptors to complete it. The lead artist sculptor was Florin Cotarcea, from Orșova. According to Drăgan's website, the businessman purchased the rock in 1992, after which the Italian sculptor Mario Galeotti assessed the location and made an initial model. The first six years involved dynamiting the rock into the basic shape, and the remaining four years were devoted to completing the detail.

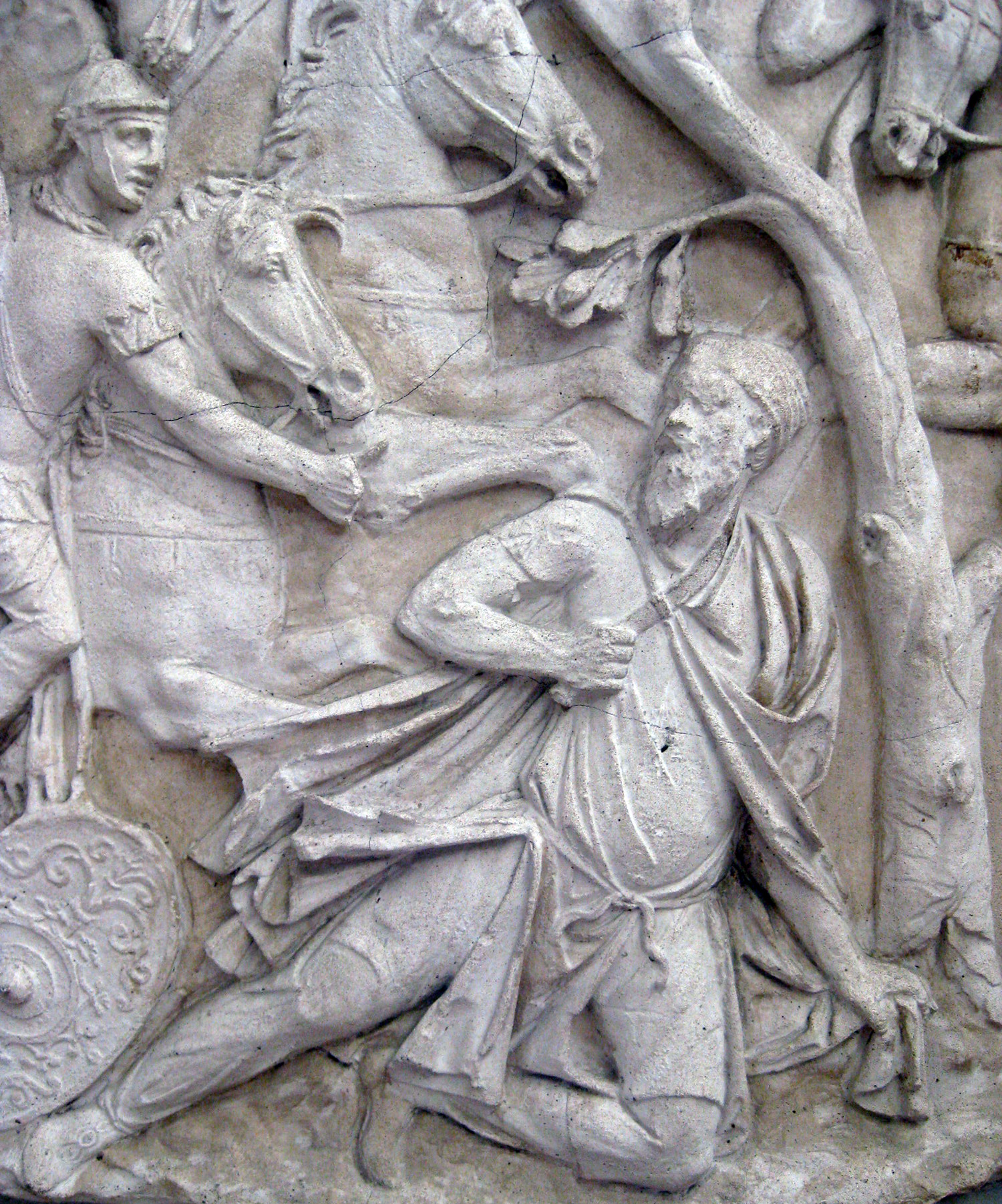
The only contemporary image of Decebalus, from Trajan's Column (AD 113); he is the man at right, with a knife to his throat. His face is narrower and his beard more pointed than is depicted on the rock sculpture.

Under the face of Decebalus there is a Latin inscription which reads "DECEBALUS REX—DRAGAN FECIT" ("King Decebalus—Made by Drăgan"). The carving was placed opposite an ancient memorial plaque, carved in the rock on the Serbian side of the river facing Romania. The plaque, known as the Tabula Traiana, records the completion of Trajan's military road along the Danube and thus commemorates the final defeat of Decebalus by Trajan in 105, and the absorption of the Dacian kingdom into the Roman Empire. Drăgan wanted the Serbs to carve a giant head of a Roman Emperor, as if confronting Decebalus on the opposite side of the river, but the Serbs refused.

== Significance ==
Drăgan was a leading figure in the protochronism and Dacianism movements, nationalist ideologies which attempted to portray Romania as the major cradle of civilisation and which identified Romania with the Dacians and an ancient Thracian empire that supposedly dominated central Europe. In this ideology, Dacia, the pre-Roman name of Romania, was the inheritor of this Thracian culture, a view expounded by Drăgan in his book and journal Noi, tracii ("We, the Thracians").

The Fundația Europeană Drăgan, Drăgan's foundation, states that "Giuseppe Costantino Dragan is a strong supporter of the theory that the original 'flame' of civilization started on the ancient territory of Romania and argues as much in his work". Drăgan saw the sculpture as a signpost to the cradle of civilisation. He is quoted saying, "Anyone travelling towards 'Decebal Rex Dragan Fecit' is also travelling towards the origins of European civilization and will discover that a United Europe represents the natural course of history".

== Descriptions ==
Michael Palin in his 2007 book New Europe described the colossal head:

As we move into the Kazan Gorge, where a small valley enters the Danube from the Romanian shore, an enormous head is carved into the rock together with the Latin inscription 'Decebalus Rex - Dragan Fecit'. It turns out to be less ancient than I thought, in fact it dates from the 1990s. The carved figure, Decebalus, was a Dacian king who took on the armies of Emperor Trajan and is regarded as a great Romanian folk hero. Dragan, more prosaically, is a rich businessman who paid for it to be carved. On this slightly ominous note of resurgent nationalism, we pass into the gorge itself.

Nick Thorpe in The Danube: A Journey Upriver from the Black Sea to the Black Forest writes,

Upstream from the church, the bulbous features of Decebal, moustachioed and wide-eyed, have been carved into the rock face, forty meters high and twenty five wide. The ancient Dacian leader stares across the river at the opposite cliff...The cliff, rising above his head into the wooded slope, provides him with the illusion of a large forehead or a pointed wizard's hat.

It has been compared to the Argonath, a pair of statues standing either side of the River Anduin at the northern entrance to a lake named Nen Hithoel in the fantasy novel The Lord of the Rings. The Argonath appears prominently in the film The Lord of the Rings: The Fellowship of the Ring (2001).

== See also ==
- Tourism in Romania
- Seven Wonders of Romania
- List of colossal sculpture in situ
