= Scorilo =

1st century AD king of Dacia

- Dacian king
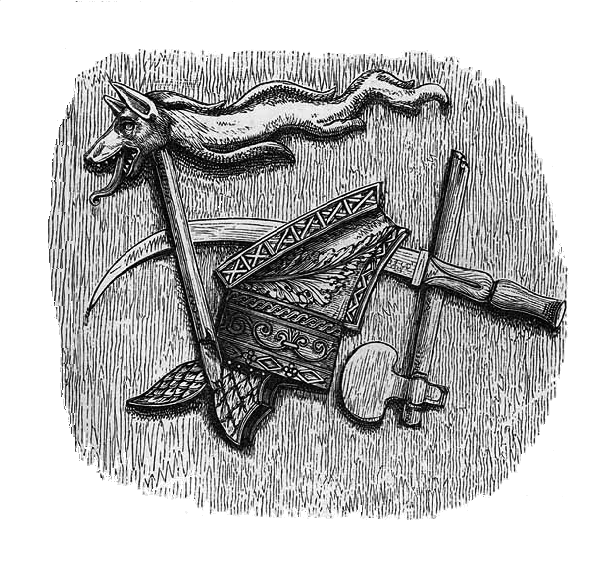
- Symbols of the Dacian kingdom
- Reign: 1st century AD
- Predecessor: Comosicus?
- Successor: Duras?

Scorilo (died maybe c. 70) was a Dacian king who may have been the father of Decebalus. Evidence for his life and reign is fragmentary.

== Sources ==
A Dacian king (dux Dacorum) called Scorylo is mentioned by Frontinus, who says he was in power during a period of turmoil in Rome.

The Roman historian Jordanes lists a series of Dacian-Getic kings before Decebalus, placing a ruler called "Coryllus" between Comosicus and Dorpaneus. Coryllus is supposed to have presided over a long peaceful 40-year rule. Modern scholars sometimes equate this otherwise unknown successor Dorpaneus with the king Duras, attested in other sources. The name Coryllus is not mentioned by any other historian either, and it has been argued that it "is a misspelling of Scorilo, a relatively common Dacian name".

On this basis, the Coryllus mentioned by Jordanes has been equated with the Scorylo mentioned by Frontinus. It has been further speculated that this ruler is also named on an ancient Dacian pot bearing the Latin stamp inscription “Decebalus per Scorilo”. Though far from certain, this has also been translated as "Decebalus son of Scorilo". If so, this might mean that Decebalus was the son of Scorilo, with Duras possibly being either an older son or a brother of Scorilo. Alternatively, the inscription may mean "[made in the pottery workshop of] Decebalus by [the potter] Scorilo".

From this evidence and references to Dacian kings elsewhere, it has been suggested that Scorilo ruled from the 30s or 40s AD through to 69-70.

== Reign ==
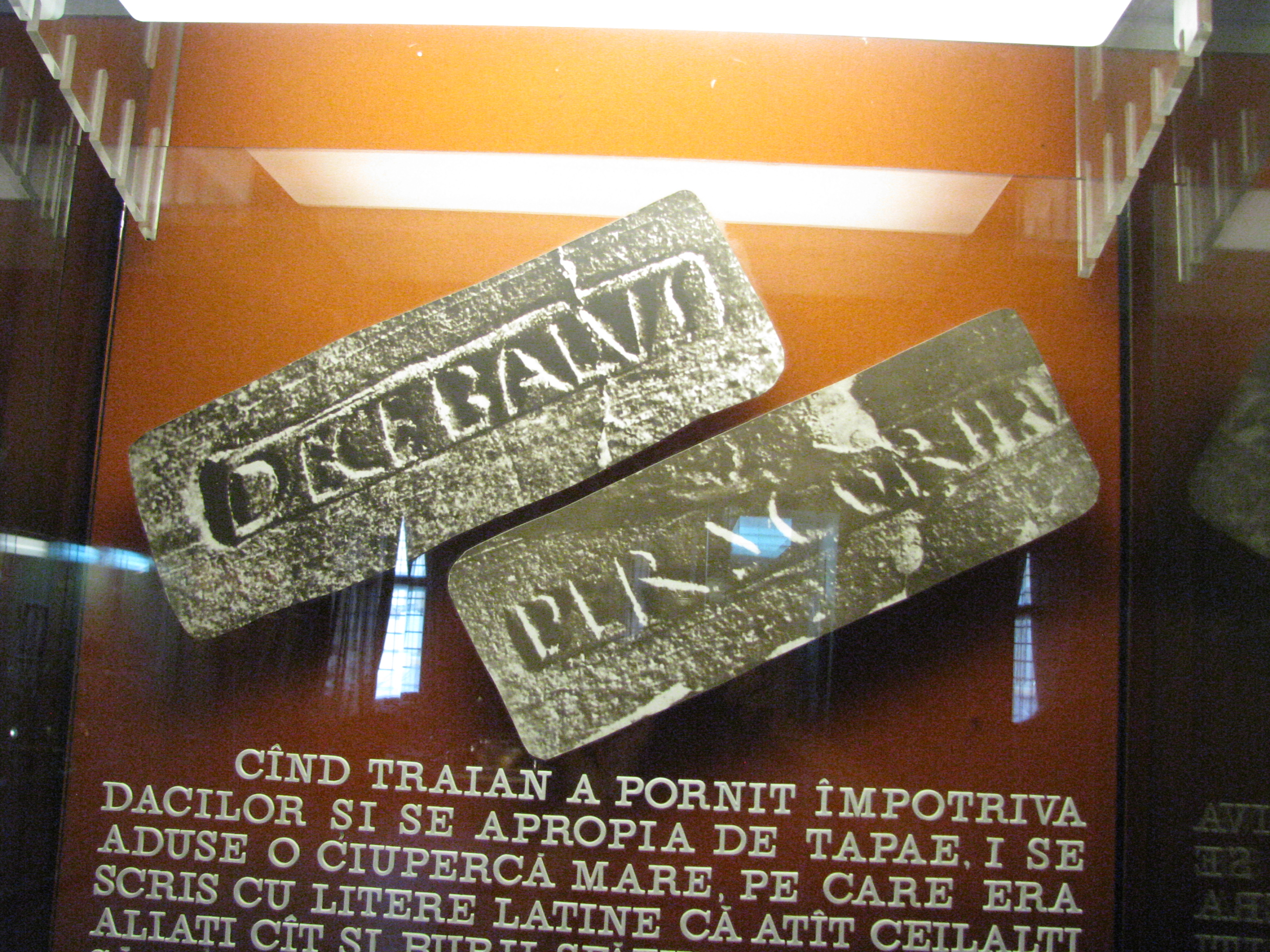
A reproduction of the "Decebalus per Scorillo" inscription

The Dacians regularly raided into Roman territory in Moesia. The emperors Tiberius and Caligula solved this problem by paying protection money to the Dacians in the form of annual subsidies. During the reign of Nero, troops were withdrawn from the Dacian border, leaving the empire vulnerable.

When Nero was overthrown in 69, the empire was plunged into turmoil in the Year of Four Emperors. The Dacians appear to have tried to take advantage of the situation to launch an invasion of Moesia in alliance with the Sarmatian Roxolani. The invasion was ill-timed. Licinius Mucianus, a supporter of Vespasian, was advancing with an army through Moesia towards Rome to overthrow Vitellius. The Dacians unexpectedly encountered his forces and were pushed back, suffering a major defeat. These events could maybe have coincided with the reign of Scorilo who is, however, not mentioned in the ancient sources on these events.

== Bibliography ==
- Brodersen, Kai (2020). Dacia felix: Das antike Rumänien im Brennpunkt der Kulturen. Darmstadt: Wissenschaftliche Buchgesellschaft. ISBN 978-3-8053-5059-4.
