= Dicomes =

1st century BC Getian king

Dicomes (1st century BC) was a Getian king.
