= Cotiso =

1st-century BC Dacian king

- King of Dacia
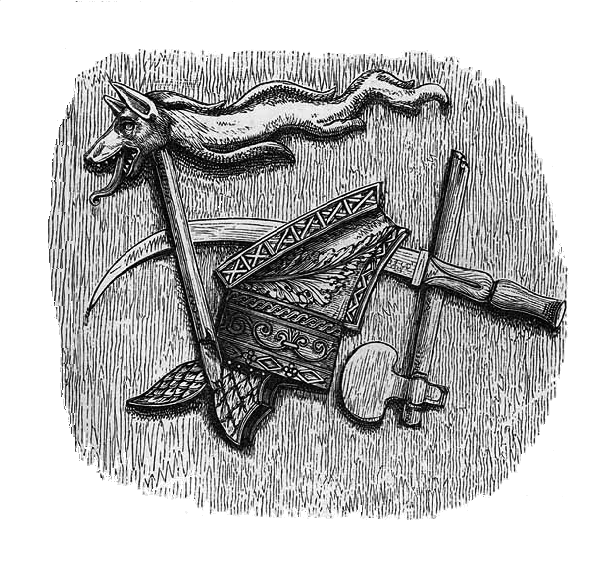
- symbols of the Dacian kingdom
- Reign: c. 40 - c. 9 BC
- Predecessor: Burebista
- Successor: Comosicus
- Died: c. 9 BC

Cotiso, Cotish or Cotison (flourished c. 30 BC) was a Dacian or Getic king who apparently ruled the mountains between Banat and Oltenia (modern-day Romania). Horace and Florus call him a Dacian; Suetonius calls him king of the Getae. Florus wrote in his account of Roman history that Cotiso and his armies used to attack towards south when the Danube froze.

Some scholars believe he is identical to Coson, a Dacian king whose name appears on gold staters found in Transylvania.

== Background ==
After the death of Burebista, the Dacian kingdom fell apart amid turmoil and civil strife. Cotiso appears to have emerged as the dominant figure in Dacia at this time, but nothing is known about his background. The new king found himself courted by the two Roman antagonists, Octavian and Mark Antony. Cotiso was in a strong position to dictate terms of any alliance to either of the conflicting parties. Octavian/Augustus worried about the frontier and possible alliance between Mark Antony and the Dacians, and plotted an expedition around 35 BC. Despite several small conflicts, no serious campaigns were mounted. Cotiso chose to ally himself with Antony. According to Alban Dewes Winspear and Lenore Kramp Geweke he "proposed that the war should be fought in Macedonia rather than Epirus. Had his proposal been accepted, the subjection of Antonius might have been less easily accomplished."

== Proposed marriage ==
According to Appian, Antony is responsible for the statement that Augustus sought to secure the goodwill of Cotiso, king of the Getae (Dacians) by giving him his daughter, and he himself marrying a daughter of Cotiso. According to Suetonius, Cotiso refused the alliance and joined the party of Antony. Suetonius (LXIII, Life of Augustus) says Mark Antony wrote that Augustus betrothed his daughter Julia to marry Cotiso (M. Antonius scribit primum eum Antonio filio suo despondisse Iuliam, dein Cotisoni Getarum regi) to create an alliance between the two men. This failed when Cotiso betrayed Augustus. Julia ended up marrying her cousin Marcus Claudius Marcellus.

According to Dio, the story about the proposed marriages is hardly credible and may have been invented by Mark Antony as propaganda to offset his own alliance with Cleopatra.

== Conflicts and death ==
After Augustus's victory in the civil wars, the Romans punished the Dacian ruler, who was apparently defeated in battle around 25 BC. In an ode dedicated to his protector, Horace advises him not to worry about Rome's safety, because Cotiso's army has been crushed. In his account of his achievements as emperor, the Res Gestae, Augustus claimed that the Dacians had been subdued. This was not entirely true, because Dacian troops frequently crossed the Danube to ravage parts of Pannonia and Moesia. He may have survived until the campaign of Marcus Vinicius in the Dacian area c.9 BC. Vinicius was the first Roman commander to cross the Danube and invade Dacia itself. Ioana A. Oltean argues that Cotiso probably died at some point during this campaign. He may have been killed in the war. According to Jordanes Cotiso was succeeded by Comosicus, about whom nothing is known beyond the name.

== Cotiso and Coson ==
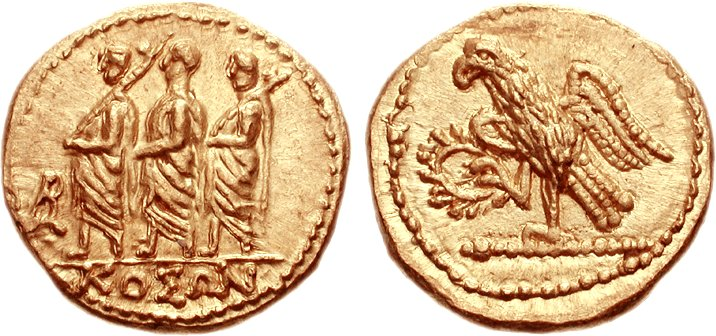
The golden stater minted with the legend ΚΟΣΩΝ.

In the 16th century a large number of gold coins were discovered in hoards in Romania. They were patterned after Roman coins, with a depiction of a Roman consul accompanied by lictors apparently copied from coins issued by Marcus Junius Brutus. The coins bore the name "Coson" or "Koson" written in Greek lettering. Theodor Mommsen argued that Koson was probably a Dacian ally of Brutus, since the imagery was taken from Brutus's coins. Recent scholars have argued that he is likely to be identical to Cotiso, since "Cotiso[n]" is an easy transcription error for Coson. Horace always spells the name with an "n" at the end. Ioana A. Oltean, however, argues that Coson and Cotiso are different people, suggesting that Cotiso was Coson's successor. However, as the Dacians were divided into several groups during this period and there were probably several rulers at the same time, these theories are mere speculation. Moreover, it is not even certain that "Coson" refers to a single person.
