= Decebalus =

King of Dacia (r. 87–106)

- Dacian king
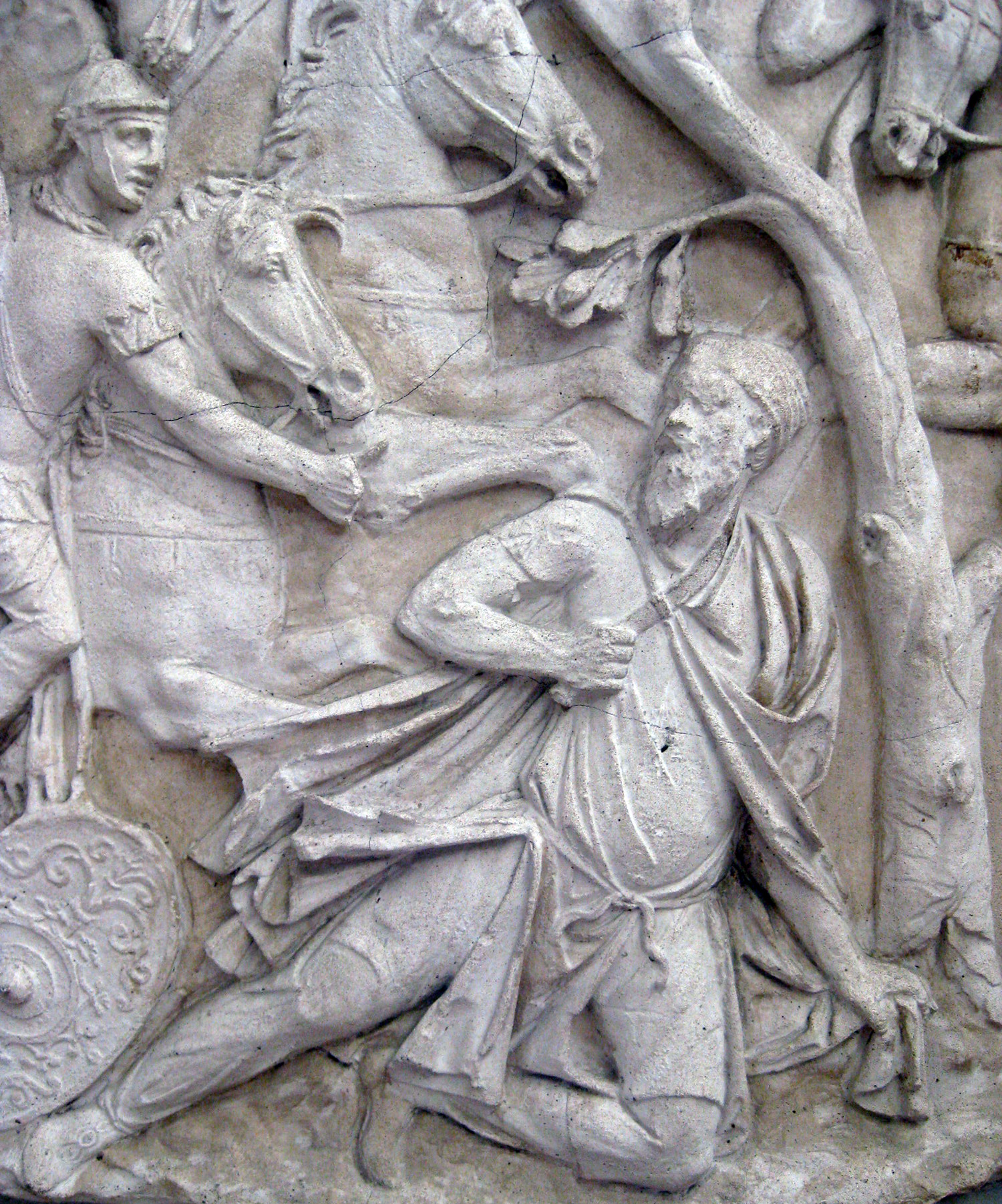
- Decebalus (with blade to throat) from Trajan's Column
- Reign: 87–106 AD
- Predecessor: Duras
- Died: 106 AD
- Father: Scorilo (purported)
- Religion: Dacian polytheism

Decebalus (Ancient Greek: Δεκέβαλος, romanized: Dekebalos; r. 87 – 106 AD), sometimes referred to as Diurpaneus, was the last Dacian king. He is known for fighting three wars, with varying success, against the Roman Empire under two emperors. After raiding south across the Danube, he defeated a Roman invasion in the reign of Domitian, securing a period of independence during which Decebalus consolidated his rule.

When Trajan came to power, his armies invaded Dacia to weaken its threat to the Roman border territories of Moesia. Decebalus was defeated in 102 AD, and his own sister was abducted within this timeframe and forcibly wed into Roman nobility, causing some historians to infer that she was the ancestress of the usurper, Regalianus, who claimed to be a kinsman of Decebalus. He remained in power as a client king, but continued to assert his independence, leading to a final and overwhelming Roman invasion north of the Danube in 105 AD. Trajan reduced the Dacian capital Sarmizegetusa to ruins in 106 AD, absorbing some of Dacia into the Empire. Decebalus died by suicide via cutting his own throat to avoid capture.

== Early life ==
After the death of Great King Burebista, Dacia split into four, then five smaller kingdoms. Nothing is known about Decebalus's youth or background. Decebalus appears to have risen to prominence in the court of the Dacian king Duras, who claimed authority over all Dacian territory. An ancient Dacian pot bearing the words “Decebalus per Scorilo” led to the suggestion that this might mean "Decebalus son of Scorilo".

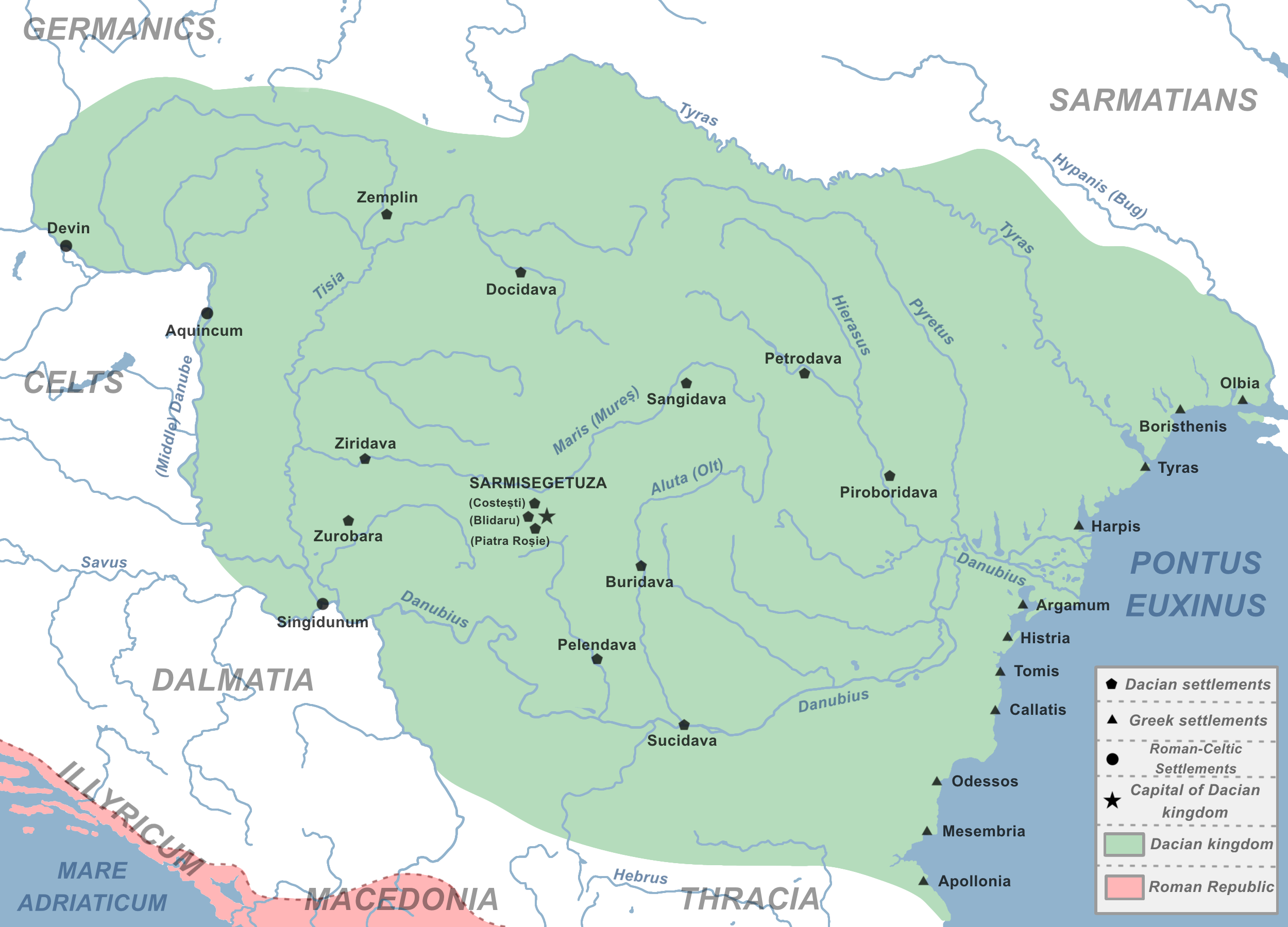
Dacian kingdom under Burebista

According to Lucian Boia this suggestion was originally a "scholarly joke", but the theory has been considered plausible by several writers. It has been suggested that "Scorilo" may be identical to the "Coryllus" or "Scorillus" identified by Jordanes as a Dacian king prior to Duras. Duras may have been Decebalus's uncle, having taken over the throne by agnatic right on his brother's death.

In 85 AD the Dacian army began minor raids upon the heavily fortified Roman province of Moesia, located south of the Danube. In 86 King Duras ordered a more vigorous attack south into Moesia. Roman sources refer to the attack being led by "Diurpaneus" (or "Dorpaneus"). Many authors have taken this person to be Duras himself, and refer to him as "Duras-Diurpaneus". Other scholars argue that Duras and Diurpaneus are different individuals, or that Diurpaneus is identical to Decebalus. Recent sources take the view that "Diurpaneus" is most likely Decebalus.

The Dacians defeated and killed Oppius Sabinus, the governor of Moesia, forcing Domitian to deploy more troops to the area. Marcus Cornelius Nigrinus replaced Sabinus. Domitian took command to deal with the problem himself, arriving with his general, prefect of the Praetorian Guards, Cornelius Fuscus.

== War against Emperor Domitian ==
Domitian pushed back the Dacians from Moesia, then returned to Rome to celebrate a Triumph, leaving Fuscus in charge of the army. Fuscus advanced into Dacia, but his four or five legions suffered a major defeat when ambushed by the forces of Decebalus (the sources say "Diurpaneus" was in command, which might mean Decebalus or Duras). Two Roman legions (among which was the V Alaudae) were ambushed and defeated at a mountain pass the Romans called Tapae (widely known as the Iron Gates of Transylvania). Fuscus was killed, and Decebalus was crowned king after the ageing Duras abdicated.

Dio Cassius described Decebalus as follows:

This man was shrewd in his understanding of warfare and shrewd also in the waging of war; he judged well when to attack and chose the right moment to retreat; he was an expert in ambuscades and a master in pitched battles; and he knew not only how to follow up a victory well, but also how to manage well a defeat. Hence he showed himself a worthy antagonist of the Romans for a long time.

Fuscus was replaced by Tettius Julianus. In 88 Julianus commanded another Roman army under Domitian against the Dacians, defeating them in a battle near Tapae. However, elsewhere in Europe, Domitian was having to deal with revolts along the Rhine, and suffered heavy defeats at the hands of the Marcomanni, and Sarmatian tribes in the east, notably the Iazyges. Needing the troops in Moesia, Domitian agreed to peace terms with Decebalus. He agreed to pay large sums (eight million sesterces) in annual tribute to the Dacians for maintaining peace. Decebalus sent his brother Diegis to Rome to accept a diadem from the Emperor, officially recognising Decebalus's royal status.

== Consolidation of power ==
Decebalus's victory greatly increased his prestige. He proceeded to centralize power and build up his fortifications and war machines, using engineers supplied by Domitian. Decebalus's court also became a haven for malcontents and deserters from the Roman empire becoming "the nucleus for anti-Roman sentiment" in the words of historian Julian Bennett. He also sought to build alliances with independent tribes, notably the Getic Bastarnae and the Sarmatian Roxolani. He failed to secure the support of the Quadi, Marcomanni and Jazyges, but ensured that they would not interfere with his plans.

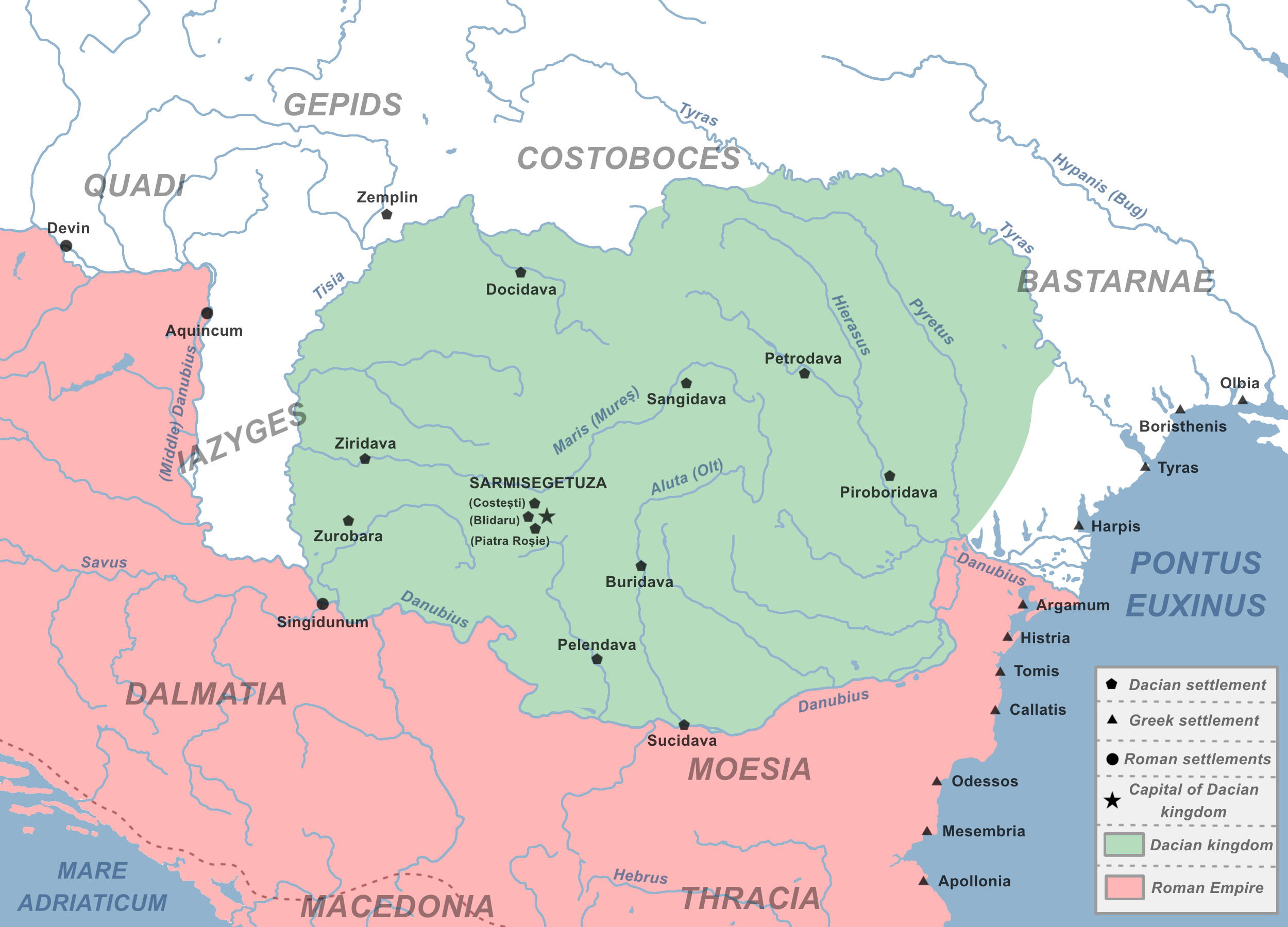
Dacian kingdom under Decebalus

== Conflicts with Trajan ==
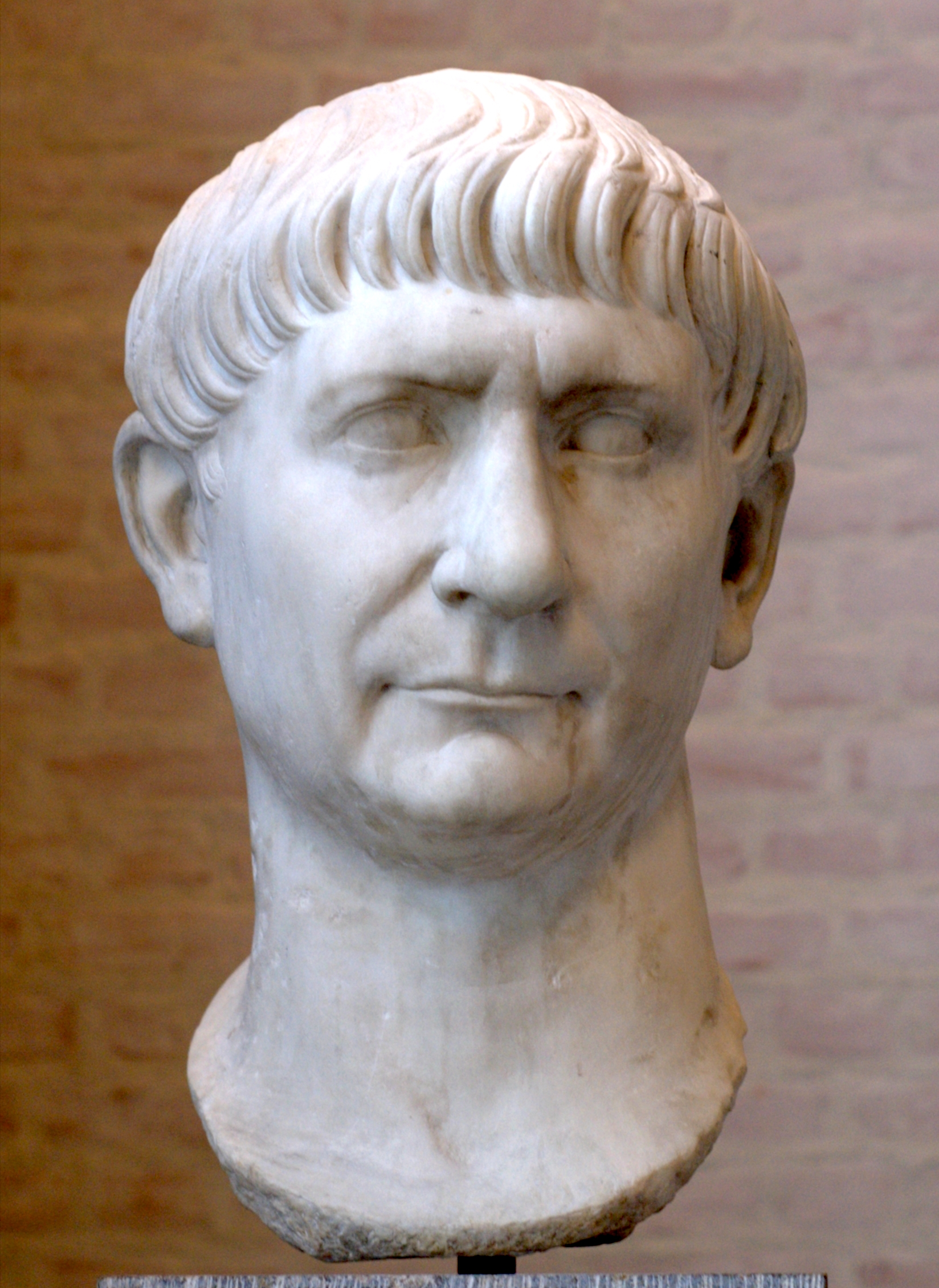
Trajan

=== First Dacian war ===
When Trajan came to power in 98, he immediately toured the Danube area and ordered the strengthening of fortifications along the Dacian frontier. Three years later, Trajan decided to launch an offensive against Dacia. According to Cassius Dio this was because "he had taken stock of [their] previous record, resented the annual sums of money they were getting, and saw that their powers and their pride were on the increase." Trajan's force crossed the Danube in 101 and advanced into Dacia, pushing back Dacian forces. According to Dio, Decebalus sent envoys asking for negotiations, but Trajan refused a personal meeting.

At the Second Battle of Tapae, Decebalus was defeated, but he inflicted serious losses on the Romans. Trajan chose not to pursue the war until the spring. Decebalus tried to wrongfoot Trajan by launching a surprise attack on Moesia, but he suffered a major defeat at the Battle of Adamclisi. Despite stiff resistance, the Romans closed on the Dacian capital by early 102. Decebalus was forced to concede defeat and accept Trajan's terms, which included the loss of some territories in the vicinity of the Danube and the dismantling of his fortresses. However, Decebalus retained his throne.

=== Second Dacian war ===
Decebalus had no intention of remaining subject to Rome, or giving up his lost territory. As soon as he was able to, he took revenge on those who had supported Rome. He annexed territory from the Jazyges and violated the peace treaty by re-arming and receiving refugees and deserters from Roman territory. He also restored his fortifications. This time, Decebalus did not wait for Trajan to strike. In 105 he authorised a direct attack on the newly occupied Roman territory, probably the fortress at Banat. The attack seems to have taken Trajan and the Senate by surprise. Trajan immediately travelled north to review fortifications.

Meanwhile, Decebalus continued to disrupt Roman positions with guerrilla attacks. He also developed a plan to assassinate Trajan by using Roman auxiliaries who had defected to the Dacians to infiltrate the emperor's camp. The plot failed. However he succeeded in capturing one of Trajan's senior officers, Pompeius Longinus, whom he tried to use as a hostage to bargain with Trajan. Longinus took poison to avoid being so used.

Trajan, meanwhile, was building a large force for a full-scale invasion. Decebalus tried to negotiate a peace settlement, but Trajan demanded that Decebalus surrender himself, which he refused to do. Decebalus's allies among the surrounding tribes seem to have deserted him at this point. Trajan launched a direct attack on the Dacian capital, Sarmizegetusa. After a long siege of Sarmizegetusa and a few skirmishes in the nearby region, the Romans conquered the Dacian capital. Decebalus managed to escape with his family. He and his remaining supporters continued a guerrilla campaign in the Carpathian mountains.

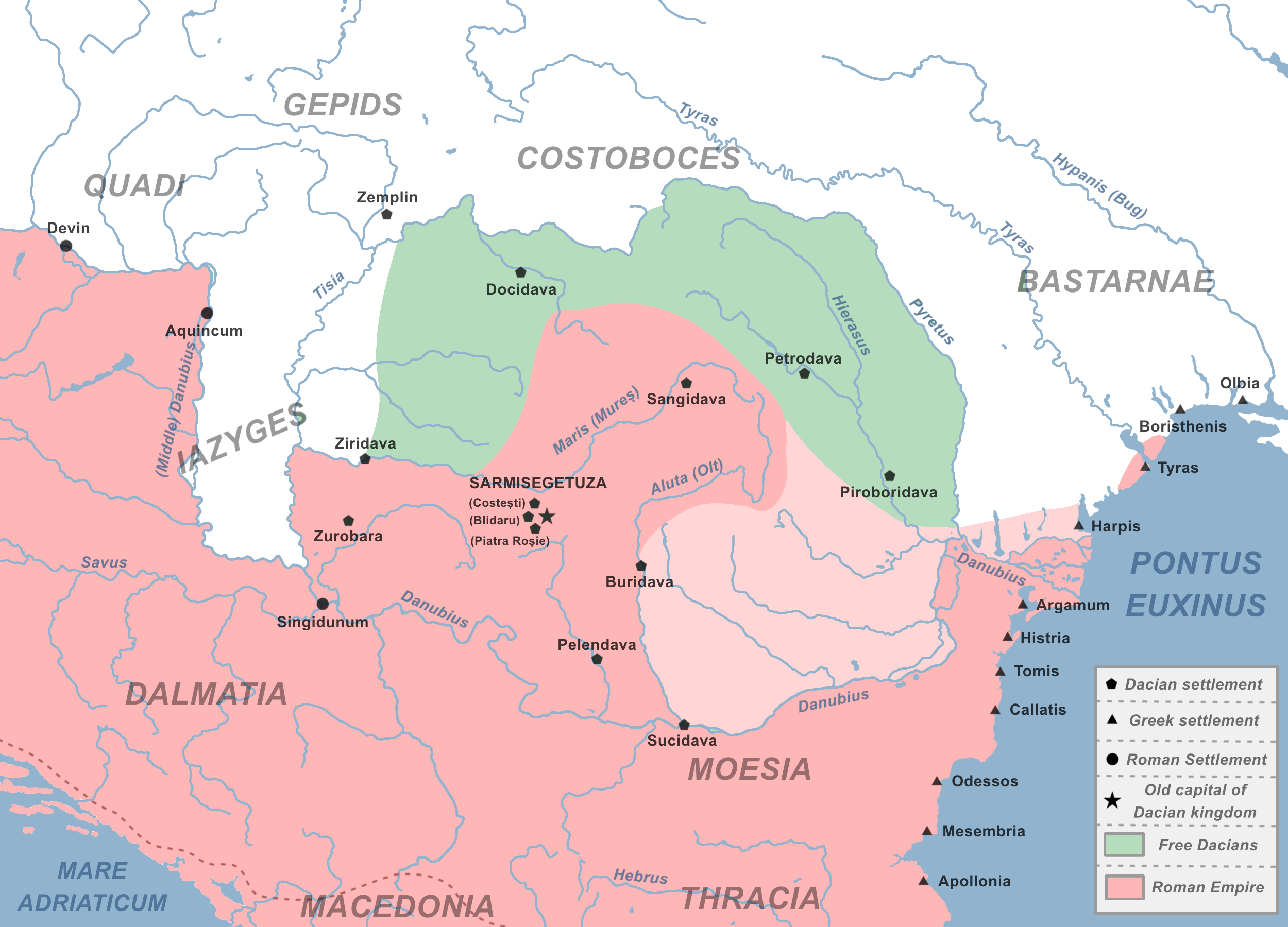
Dacia after the Roman conquest

=== Death ===
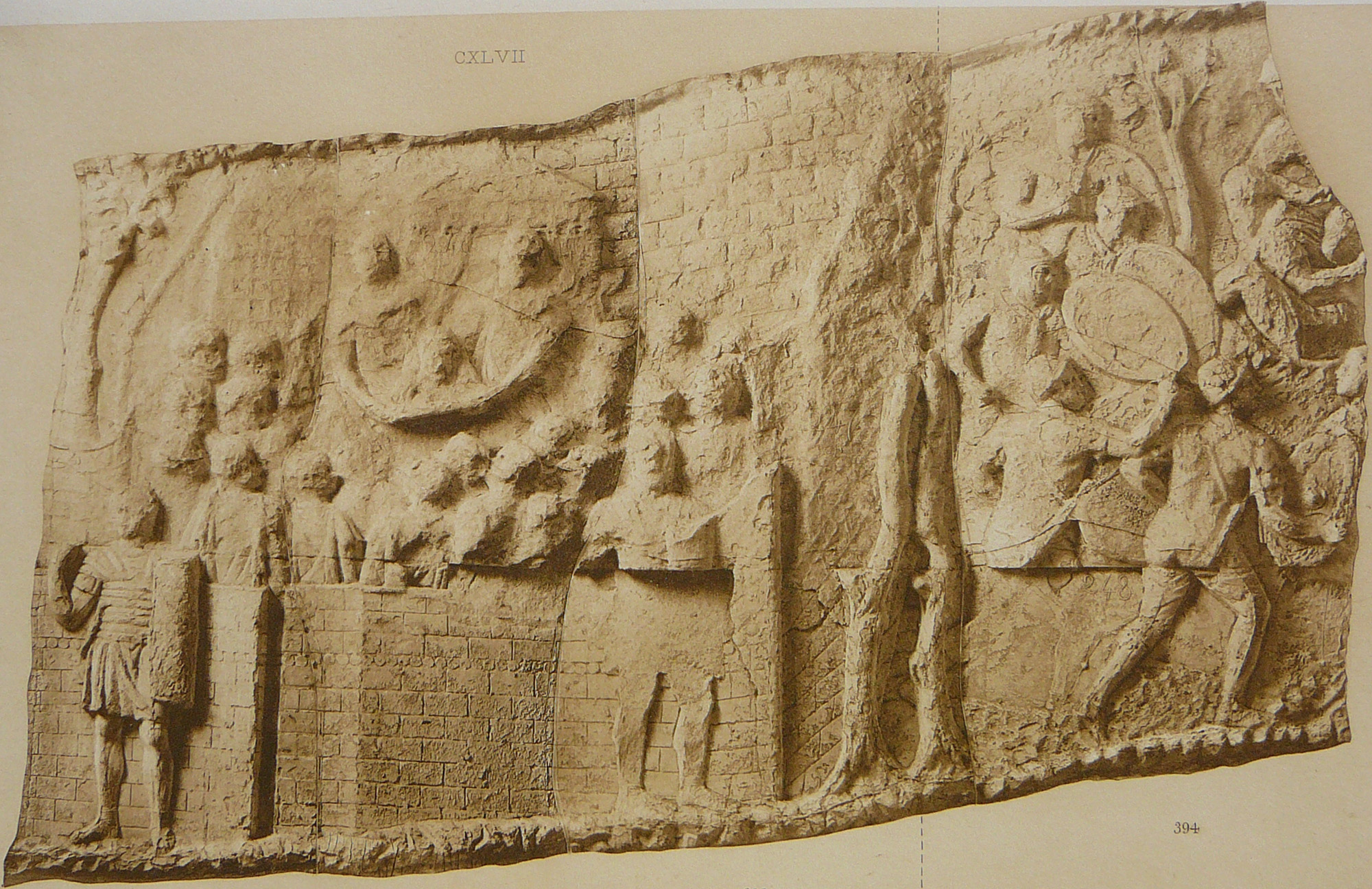
Plaster cast (Cichorius 108) of panel on Trajan's Column. The head of the defeated Dacian king Decebalus (left background) is displayed on a shield to Roman troops (AD 106). The head was then taken to Rome to form the central exhibit in the emperor Trajan's official Triumph

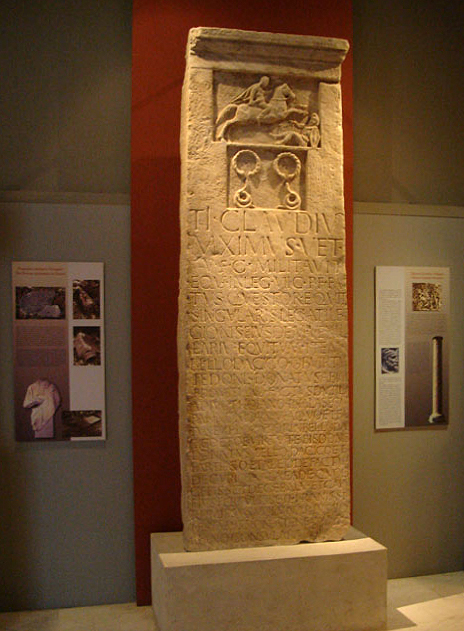
Tiberius Claudius Maximus memorial

Decebalus was hunted down and finally cornered by Roman detachments seeking his head. Rather than being captured only to be exhibited and humiliated at Rome, Decebalus committed suicide by slashing his own throat, as depicted on Trajan's Column (spiral 22, panel b).

It is likely that he killed himself as a Roman cavalry scout named Tiberius Claudius Maximus from Legio VII Claudia was approaching. He was probably still alive when Maximus reached him, as is claimed on Maximus's funerary stele discovered at Gramini in Greece. Maximus is presumably the figure seen on Trajan's column reaching out to Decebalus from his horse.

Decebalus's head and right hand were then taken to Trajan in "Ranisstorum" (an unidentified Dacian village, perhaps Piatra Craivii) by Maximus, who was decorated by the emperor. The trophy was sent to Rome where it was thrown down the Gemonian stairs. Tiberius Claudius Maximus's tomb cites two occasions where the legionary was decorated for his part in the Dacian wars, one of which being the acquisition of Decebalus's head.

Territorial evolution of the Dacian kingdom from Burebista to Decebalus.

== Romanian national hero ==
Decebalus is considered a national hero in Romania, and has been portrayed in numerous literary works, movies, public sculptures, and other memorials.

Decebalus began to be seen in these terms during the 19th century, when he came to be associated with Romantic ideals of national freedom and resistance to imperialism. Romanian politician Mihail Kogălniceanu gave a speech in 1843 in which he called Decebalus "the greatest barbarian king of all time, more worthy to be on the throne of Rome than the rascally descendants of Augustus!"

Alecu Russo compared him to the medieval hero Stephen the Great, saying "The one and the other both had the same aim, the same sublime idea: the independence of their country! Both are heroes, but Stephen is a more local hero, a Moldavian hero, while Decebalus is the hero of the world." Mihai Eminescu, the Romanian national poet, wrote the historical drama Decebalus. George Coșbuc's 1896 poem Decebal către popor (Decebalus to his People) lauds the Dacian leader's scorn of death.

Decebalus is often paired with his enemy Trajan, with the former representing national identity and the latter the grandeur and classical values brought by Rome. Decebalus and Trajan were depicted as a pair on many Romanian banknotes.

Decebalus and Trajan were regularly invoked at the coronation of new rulers. Both featured significantly in the imagery of Ferdinand I of Romania and his wife Marie of Romania. The Romanian poet Aron Cotruș wrote a long poem "Maria Doamna" ("Lady Marie") after Marie's death, invoking both Decebalus and Trajan as admirers of Marie. The Dacian king, along with the Roman emperor who conquered Dacia are sometimes invoked as the fathers of the Romanian nation.

He remained a hero in the Communist era, especially in the Stalinist "national Communism" of Gheorghe Gheorghiu-Dej. According to Lavinia Stan and Lucian Turcescu, "In a process paralleling the way modern Serbs perceive the defeat by the Ottomans in the Battle of Kosovo of 1389, Decebal's defeat at the hands of Trajan in 101–107 CE and the resulting population mix were reclaimed as the cornerstones of Romanian ethnic identity". The nationalist model progressed further under Nicolae Ceaușescu, under whom Decebalus was listed as one of the ten great leaders of Romania.

He was depicted as a great national leader in two major epic films in this period, The Dacians (1967, directed by Sergiu Nicolaescu), and The Column (1968, directed by Mircea Drăgan). In both films he was portrayed by Amza Pellea. Several public statues of Decebalus were also set up in the Ceaușescu era, including an equestrian statue in Deva created in 1978 by the sculptor Ion Jalea, and a column topped by a bust in Drobeta-Turnu Severin, created in 1972.

He was central to the nationalist protochronism movement, which identifies Romania as the cradle of east-European civilisation, and the Dacianism movement, which directly relates Romania as descendants of the Dacians. During the 1990s, a team of sculptors carved a 40-metre-tall rock sculpture of Decebalus from a stone outcrop overlooking the Danube near the city of Orșova, Romania. It was devised and funded by Iosif Constantin Drăgan, a supporter of the protochronist and Dacianist movement. He is quoted saying, "Anyone travelling towards 'Decebal Rex Dragan Fecit' [King Decebalus made by Dragan] is also travelling towards the origins of east-European civilization and will discover that a United Europe represents the natural course of history".

== Image gallery ==
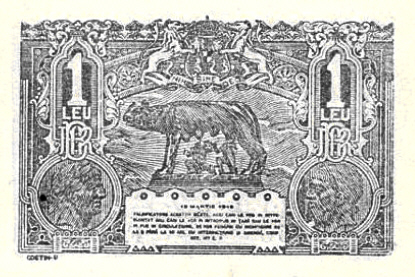
1915 Romanian banknote pairing Trajan and Decebalus

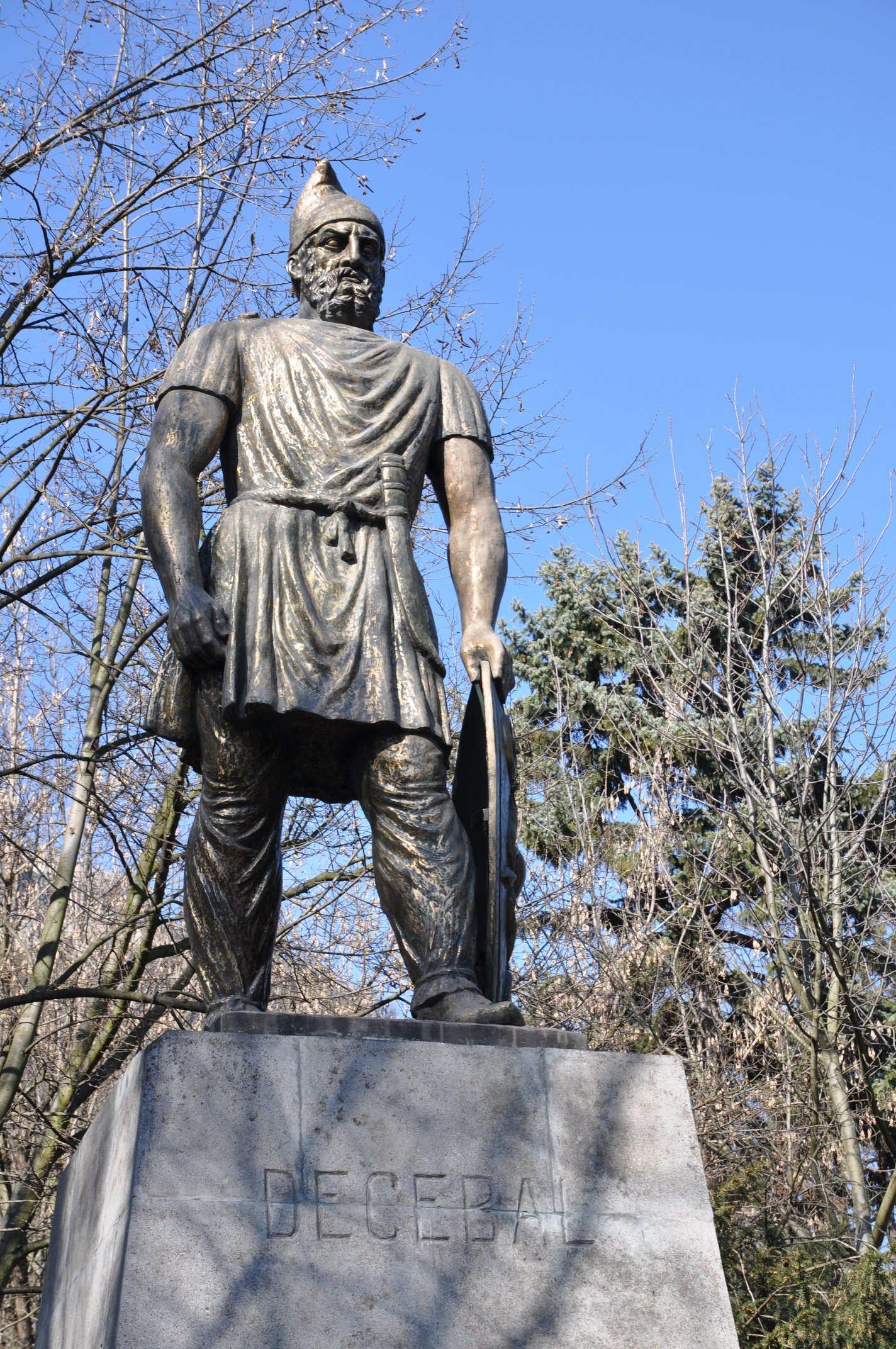
Statue of Decebalus in Deva, Romania (1937)

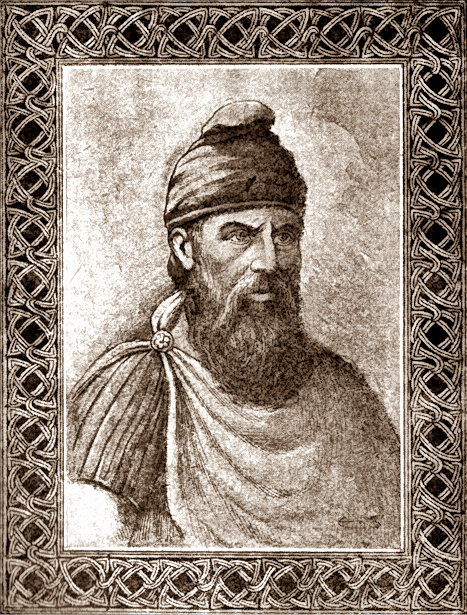
Decebalus, as depicted in Popescu-Băjenaru's Cartea omului matur (1969)

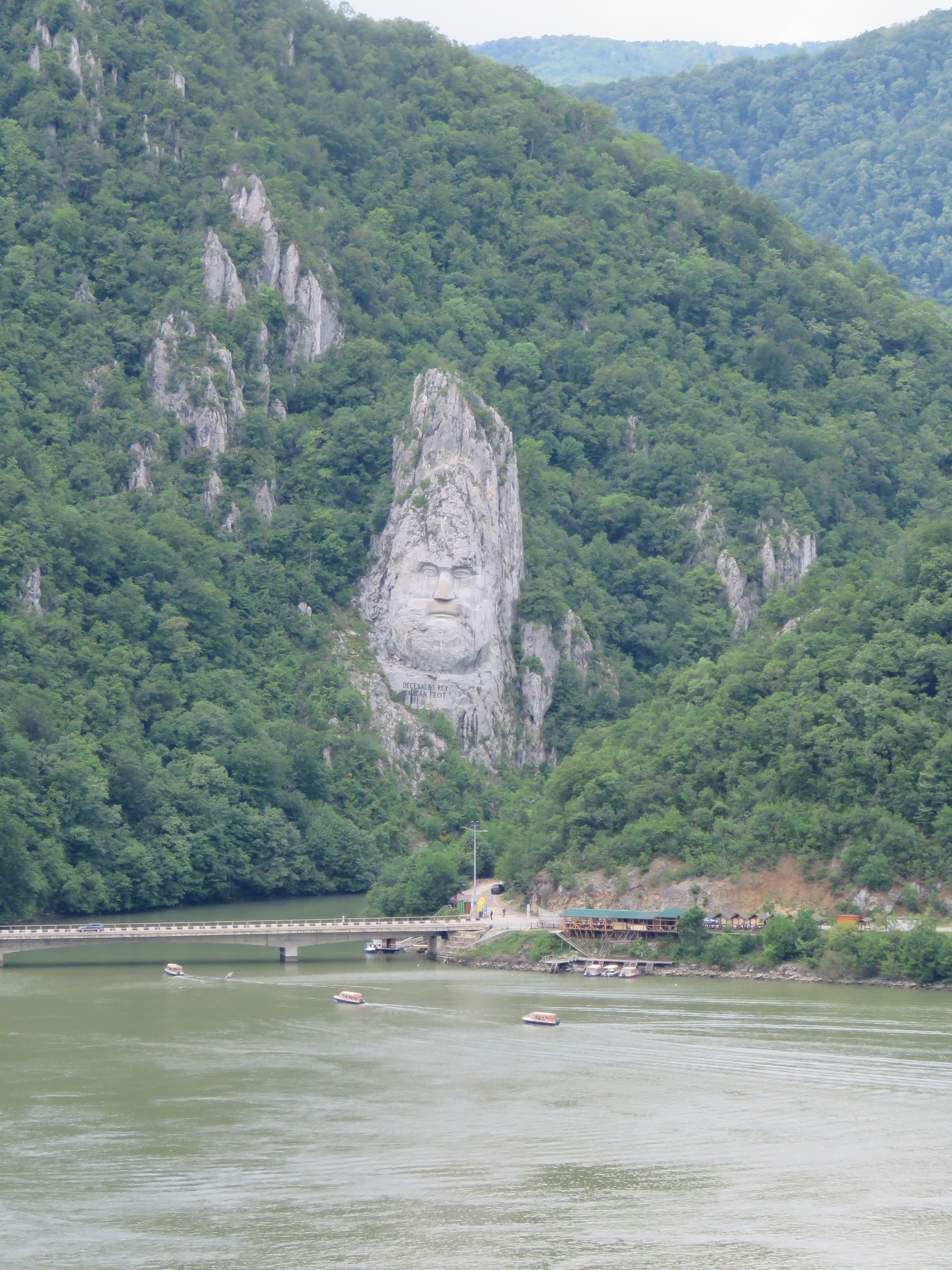
The rock sculpture of Decebalus (2004) at the Iron Gates on Danube: overview…

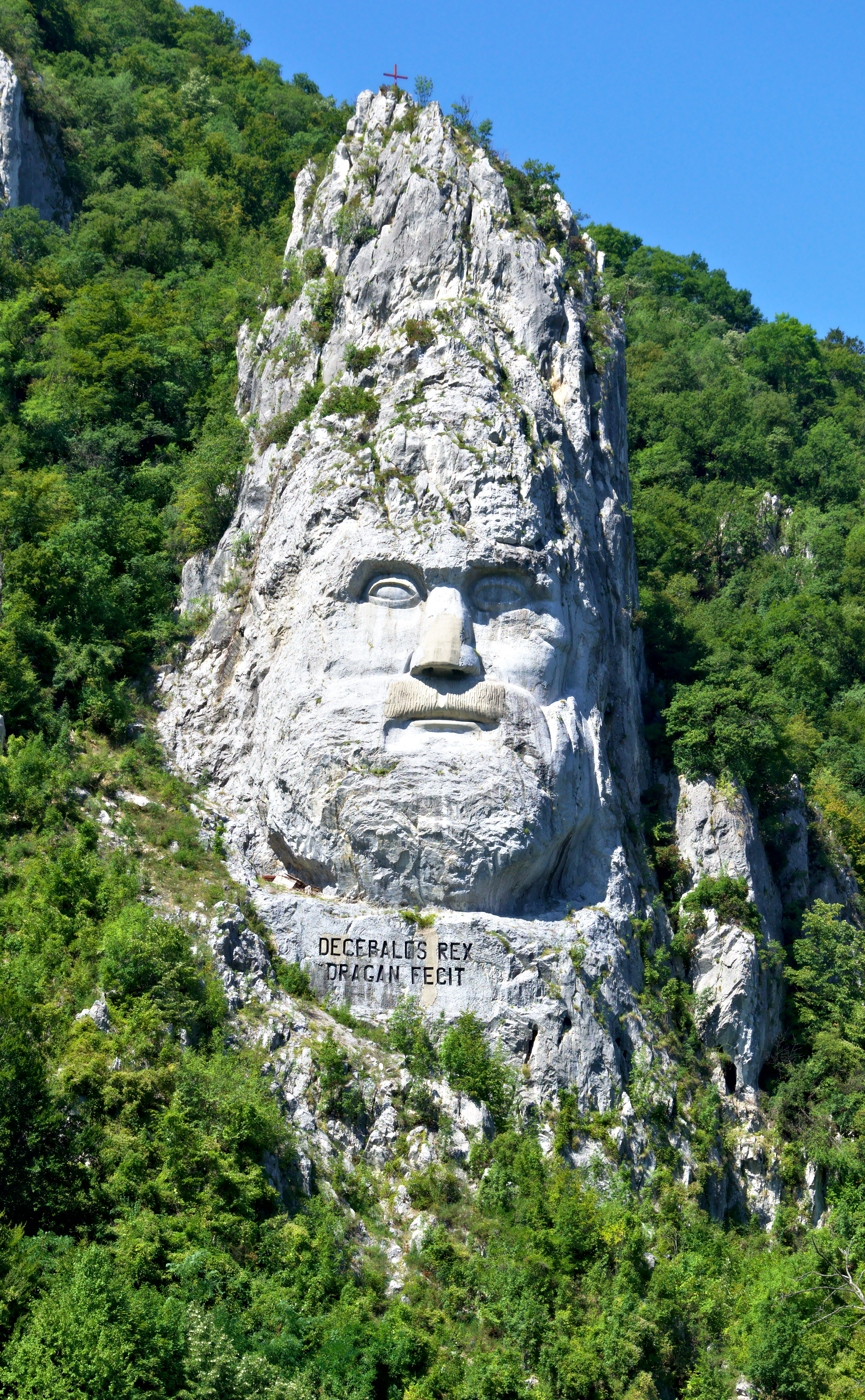
…and zoomed-in view

== See also ==
- Decebalus Treasure
- Regalianus was, according to Tyranni Triginta, a descendant of Decebalus.
- Trajan's Dacian Wars
- List of Dacian kings
