= Comosicus =

Late 1st century BC / early 1st century AD king of Dacia

- Dacian king
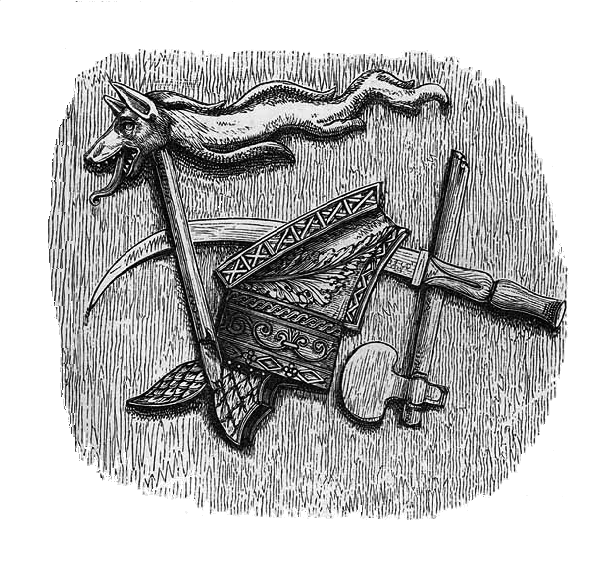
- symbols of the Dacian kingdom
- Reign: 9 BC(?) -30s AD.
- Predecessor: Cotiso
- Successor: Scorilo

Comosicus was a Dacian king and high priest who lived in the 1st century BC. The only reference to Comosicus is a passage in the writings of the Roman historian Jordanes.

== Sources ==
Jordanes refers to Burebista as king of Dacia, but then goes on to discuss a high priest called Dicineus who taught the Dacians astronomy and whose wisdom was revered. He then says that "after the death of Dicienus, they held Comosicus in almost equal honour, because he was not inferior in knowledge. By reason of his wisdom he was accounted their priest and king, and he judged the people with the greatest uprightness. When he too had departed Coryllus ascended the throne as king of the Goths [Getae] and for forty years ruled his people in Dacia."

== Interpretations ==
"Coryllus" is widely believed to be identical to Scorilo, but there is no other evidence concerning Comosicus. Jordanes' ambiguity about the status of Dicineus in relation to Burebista possibly arises from the fact that after Burebista's assassination in 44 BC his empire dissolved, with the exception of the nucleus around the Orăștie Mountains, while the rest divided into various kingdoms. The concept of a priest-judge may have provided a trans-tribal unity. Louis Marin refers to Dicineus as "a sort of double for the king, a double who also stood in for Burebista's successor Comosicus", since Comosicus embodies a "twin royalty, political and religious".

Since Comosicus's successor Scorilo appears to have come to power sometime between 30 and 40 AD, Comosicus's accession immediately after Burebista would imply an impossibly long reign. Other evidence suggests that a ruler called Cotiso was the dominant power in the late 1st century BC. Ioana A. Oltean argues that Comosicus probably succeeded Cotiso at some point during the campaign of Marcus Vinicius in the Dacian area c.9 BC and ruled until 29 AD. He may have been the first Dacian ruler to combine the positions of priest and king.
