= Egnatius =

Egnatius may refer to:

- Gellius Egnatius, a leader of an ancient Italic tribe
- Gnaeus Egnatius, an ancient Roman aristocrat and senator
- Egnatius Lucillus, an ancient Roman aristocrat and senator
- Egnatius Lucillianus, an ancient Roman provincial governor
- Egnatius Victor Marinianus, an ancient Roman aristocrat
- Aulus Egnatius Priscillianus, an ancient Roman philosopher
- Aulus Egnatius Proculus, an ancient Roman aristocrat and senator
- Lucius Egnatius Victor, an ancient Roman aristocrat
- Lucius Egnatius Victor Lollianus, an ancient Roman aristocrat
- Marcus Egnatius Marcellinus, an ancient Roman aristocrat and senator
- Marcus Egnatius Postumus, an ancient Roman aristocrat and senator
- Publius Egnatius Celer, an ancient Roman philosopher
- Publius Licinius Egnatius Marinianus, an ancient Roman aristocrat
- Quintus Egnatius Gallienus Perpetuus, an ancient Roman aristocrat
- Quintus Egnatius Proculus, an ancient Roman aristocrat
- Quintus Egnatius Proculus (suffect consul 219), an ancient Roman aristocrat
- Iohannes Baptista Egnatius, better known as Egnazio (1478–1553), Venetian senator
- Egnatius, a monotypic genus of grasshoppers in the family Acrididae with the only species Egnatius apicalis

== See also ==
- Egnatia gens
