= List of undated Roman consuls =

This is a list of Roman consuls, individuals who were either elected or nominated to the highest elected political office of the Roman Republic, or a high office of the Empire, but for whom an exact date of when they served in office is absent. Most are reckoned to be suffect consuls, but occasionally it encompasses an ordinary consul.

== 3rd century BC ==
Approximate Year	Consul(s)	Consul type
Between 222 and 218	Marcus Aemilius Lepidus	suffectus

== 1st century AD ==
Approximate Year	Consul(s)	Consul type
21 or 22	Gaius Annius Pollio	suffectus
21, 22, 40 or 41	Marcus Cocceius Nerva; Gaius Vibius Rufinus	suffecti
Between 37 and 54	Pompeius Pedo	suffectus
39 or 40	Pompeius Pennus	suffectus
39 or 40	Lucius Annius Vinicianus	suffectus
39 or 40	Cluvius	suffectus
c. 40	Gaius Ummidius Durmius Quadratus	suffectus
40, 41 or 44	Titus Axius; Titus Mussidius Pollianus	suffecti
40, 44 or 45	Publius Fabius Firmanus; Lucius Tampius Flavianus (Note: His first consulship lacks a fixed date.)	suffecti
40, 42, or 45	Popillius Balbus	suffectus
40, 42, or 45	Anteius Rufus	suffectus
Between 40 and 46	Lurius Varus	suffectus
Between 40 and c.200	Gaius Nonius Proculus	suffectus
Between 41 and 54	Gaius Calpurnius Piso	suffectus
42 or 43	Gaius Suetonius Paulinus	suffectus
45 or 47	Marius Cordus	suffectus
Before 47	Publius Ostorius Scapula	suffectus
49, 50 or 54	Quintus Futius; Publius Calvisius	suffecti
53 or 54	Publius Volasenna	suffectus
53 or 54	Marcus Aponius Saturninus	suffectus
c. 54	Pompeius Paullinus	suffectus
54 or 55	Marcus Junius Silanus	suffectus
60 or 61	Aulus Ducenius Geminus	suffectus
60 or 61	Lucius Junius Quintus Vibius Crispus	suffectus
Before 65	Cluvius Rufus	suffectus
Between 60 and 65	Caesennius Maximus	suffectus
Between 60 and 65	Rubrius Gallus	suffectus
Before 69	Lucius Venuleius Montanus; Gaius Dexius Staberianus	suffectus
c. 70	Lucius Sergius Paullus	suffectus
c. 71	Lucius Nonius Calpurnius Asprenas	suffectus
c. 72	Titus Vestricius Spurinna	suffectus
c. 72	Gnaeus Pinarius Cornelius Clemens	suffectus
72 or 73	Gaius Dillius Aponianus	suffectus
72 or 73	Lucius Cornelius Pusio Annius Messalla; Plotius Pegasus	suffecti
72 or 73	Sextus Vettulenus Cerialis	suffectus
72 or 73	Publius Nonius Asprenas Caesius Cassianus	suffectus
Between 72 and 74	Titus Aurelius Fulvus	suffectus
Between 72 and 74	Lucius Nonius Calpurnius Torquatus Asprenas	suffectus
Between 72 and 75	Mettius Pomposianus	suffectus
Between 72 and 78	Aulus Didius Gallus Fabricius Veiento	suffectus
c. 73	Sextus Julius Frontinus	suffectus
73 or 74	Marcus Hirrius Fronto Neratius Pansa	suffectus
Between 73 and 76	Gaius Vettulenus Civica Cerealis	suffectus
Between 73 and 76	Lucius Mestrius Florus	suffectus
Between 74 and 78	[...] Marcellus; Quintus Aurelius Pactumeius Clemens	suffecti
Between 74 and 79	Titus Turpilius Dexter; Marcus Maecius Rufus	suffecti
75 or 76	Sextus Sentius Caecilianus	suffectus
Between 76 and 78	Gnaeus Domitius Afer Titius Marcellus Curvius Lucanus	suffectus
Between 76 and 78	Gnaeus Domitius Afer Curvius Tullus	suffectus
77 or 78	Lucius Luscius Ocrea	suffectus
c. 78	Lucius Octavius Memor	suffectus
Before 79	Publius Glitius Gallus	suffectus
Before 79	Quintus Cornelius Fa[...] [...]nidius Quartus	suffecti
Before 79	Marcus Corvius Rufus (or Rusticus)	suffectus
Before 79	[...] Cominius; Lucius Minicius	suffecti
Before 80	Aulus Caesennius Gallus	suffectus
c. 80	Lucius Salvius Otho Cocceianus	suffectus
Before 82	Titus Atilius Rufus	suffectus
82 or 83	Aulus Didius Gallus Fabricius Veiento III	suffectus
82 or 83	Lucius Junius Quintus Vibius Crispus III	suffectus
83 or 84	Gnaeus Pedanius Fuscus Salinator	suffectus
c. 84	Marius Priscus	suffectus
c. 84	Publius Calvisius Ruso Julius Frontinus	suffectus
Before 87	Servius Cornelius Scipio Salvidienus Orfitus	suffectus
Before 87	Lucius Dasumius Hadrianus	suffectus
Before 87	Sallustius Lucullus	suffectus
Before 87	Helvidius Priscus	suffectus
c. 93	[ ? Lucius] Julius Mar(inus)?	suffectus
After 97	Quintus Asinius Marcellus; Aulus Caepio Crispinus	suffecti
Before 100	Aufidius Umber	suffectus
Late 1st to early 2nd century	Lucius Julius Proculeianus	suffectus

== 2nd century ==
Approximate Year	Consul(s)	Consul type
1st half of 2nd century	Lucius Volusius Torquatus	suffectus
Before 103	Marcus Herennius Pollio	suffectus
Before 103	Lucceius Albinus	suffectus
c. 104	Sextus Subrius Dexter Cornelius Priscus	suffectus
Before 105	Decimus Terentius Scaurianus	suffectus
Before 105	[? Gnaeus Pompeius] Longinus II	suffectus
After 105	Marcus Clodius Lunensis; Publius Licinius Crassus	suffecti
106 or 108	Lucius Tutilius Lupercus	suffectus
Before 109	Gaius Julius Alexander	suffectus
Before 109	Kan[us Junius Niger]	suffectus
c. 117	Marcus Erucius Clarus; Tiberius Julius Alexander Julianus	suffecti
c. 117	Lusius Quietus	suffectus
Between 117 and 138	Gaius Anto[nius ...]	suffectus
Before 118	Lucius Bellicius Sollers	suffectus
Between 118 and 138	Herennius Severus	suffectus
Before 120	Calpurnius Reginnianus	suffectus
Before 120	[? A- or Se]rtorius	suffectus
c. 120	Junius Qua[dratus?]	suffectus
120 or 121	[...]catus Publius Valerius Priscus	suffectus
120 or 121	Quintus Aburnius Caedicianus; Gaius Bruttius Praesens Lucius Fulvius Rusticus	suffecti
Between 121 and 123	Lucius Cornelius Latinianus	suffectus
Between 123 and 126	Gaius Calpurnius Flaccus; Lucius Trebius Germanus	suffecti
Between 123 and 142	Ennius (?) Proculus	suffectus
Before 125	Lucius Statorius Secundus	suffectus
Before 125	Cornelius Proculus	suffectus
c. 125	Niger; Tiberius Lartidius Celer	suffecti
Between 125 and 129	Quintus Vetina; Publius Julius	suffecti
c. 126	Sextus Julius Major	suffectus
c. 126	Tiberius Julius Julianus Alexander	suffectus
c. 129	Tiberius Julius Candidus Celsus	suffectus
Between 129 and 138	Severus; Lucius Flavius Arrianus Xenophon	suffecti
Between 129 and 133	Lucius Aurelius Gal[lus] [...]us Priscus	suffecti
Between 130 and 138	Gaius Oppius Sabinus Julius Nepos Manius Vibius Sollemnis Severus	suffectus
c. 130	Titus Atilius Maximus	suffectus
c. 130	Julianus; Castus	suffecti
Between 130 and 150	Claudius Varenus	suffectus
c. 131	Lucius Antonius Albus	suffectus
c. 132	Popillius Priscus	suffectus
132 or 133	Lucius Varius Ambibulus	suffectus
135 or 136	Quintus Lollius Urbicus	suffectus
Between 135 and 137	[? Lucius Nonius Calpurnius] Torquatus Asprenas; Lucius Sergius Paullus	suffecti
c. 136	Lucius Roscius Paculus	suffectus
c. 137	Titus Vitrasius Pollio	suffectus
Before 138	Valerius Urbicus	suffectus
c. 138	Cornellius Priscianus	suffectus
c. 138	Gaius Julius Severus	suffectus
c. 138	Titus Caesernius Quinctianus	suffectus
138 or 139	[...]us Priscus	suffectus
Between 138 and 143	Publius Cluvius Maximus Paullinus	suffectus
Between 138 and 160	Marcus Ulpius Carminius Claudianus	suffectus
Between 138 and 161	Lucius Sariolenus Naevius Fastus	suffectus
Between 138 and 180	Lucius Marius Vegetinus Marcianus Minicianus Myrtilianus	suffectus
c. 139	Appius Annius Gallus	suffectus
139 or 140	Domitius Seneca	suffectus
Between 138 and 143	Lucius Pomponius Bassus Cascus Scribonianus	suffectus
Between 140 and 143	Gaius Javolenus Calvinus	suffectus
140 or 141	Titus Caesernius Statianus	suffectus
c. 141	Lucius Annius Fabianus	suffectus
141, 143 or 144	Gaius Claudius Maximus	suffectus
143, 149, 150 or 158	Sextus Pedius Hirrutus Lucilius Pollio; Lucius Iu[...]	suffecti
144 or 145	Lucius Neratius Proculus	suffectus
c. 145	Lucius Venuleius Apronianus Octavius Priscus	suffectus
Before 146	Sextus Erucius Clarus	suffectus
Before 147	Sulpicius Julianus	suffectus
Between 147 and 156	Sextus Aemilius Equester	suffectus
Between 149 and 151	Titus Flavius Longinus Quintus Marcius Turbo	suffectus
Between 149 and 151	Gnaeus Julius Verus	suffectus
Mid 2nd-century	Quintus Antonius Cassius Cassianus	suffectus
c. 150	Quintus Caecilius Marcellus Dentilianus	suffectus
150 or 151	Lucius Novius Crispinus Martialis Saturninus	suffectus
150 or 151	Decimus Seius Seneca	suffectus
c. 151	Publius Seius Fuscianus	suffectus
c. 151	Titus Pomponius Proculus Vitrasius Pollio	suffectus
c. 151	Decimus Fonteius Fronto	suffectus
Before 154	Gaius Jul[ius ...]	suffectus
Between 154 and 157?	Gratus	suffectus
Before 155	Tiberius Claudius Agrippinus	suffectus
Between 155 and 160	Lucius Fulvius Rusticus Aemilianus	suffectus
c. 156	Julius Proculus	suffectus
156 or 157	Quintus Antonius Isauricus; Lucius Aurelius Flaccus	suffecti
Mid 2nd Century	Accius Julianus	suffectus
Before 159, possibly 155 or 156	Maximus Lucilianus	suffectus
c. 158	Lucius Junius Victorinus Flavius Caelianus	suffectus
c. 159	Gaius Julius Commodus Orfitianus	suffectus
c. 159	Lucius Matuccius Inscinus	suffectus
159 or 160	Marcus Jallius Bassus Fabius Valerianus	suffectus
c. 161	Publius Furius Saturninus	suffectus
Between 161 and 168	[...] Proculus; Munatius [...]	suffecti
Between 161 and 169, or 177 and 180	[...] Egr[ilius Plarianus Larcius Lep]idus [Flavius ...]	suffectus
Between 161 and 169	Sextus Cornelius Clemens	suffectus
Between 161 and 192	Junius Macr(---) (? Macer)	suffectus
Between 161 and 192	Lucius Junius Rufinus Proculianus	suffectus
Between 161 and 211	Junius Paulinus	suffectus
c. 162	Gaius Allius Fuscianus	suffectus
c. 162	Lucius Pullaienus Gargilius Antiquus	suffectus
163 or 164	Publius Julius Scapula Tertullus	suffectus
Before 164	Sohaemus	suffectus
c. 164	Gaius Raecius Rufus	suffectus
Between 164 and 169	[...]ci[.]us L. Aemilus Front[inus]	suffecti
c. 165	Publius Vigellius Saturninus	suffectus
c. 165	Gaius Maesius Picatianus	suffectus
Between 165 and 168	Novius P[riscus]	suffectus
Before October 166	Marcus Claudius Fronto	suffectus
165 or 166	Publius Julius Geminius Marcianus	suffectus
c. 166	Lucius Volusius Maecianus	suffectus
166 or 167	Gaius Avidius Cassius	suffectus
c. 167	Quintus Antistius Adventus Postumius Aquilinus	suffectus
c. 167	Gnaeus Claudius Severus	suffectus
c. 167	Marcus Arranius Venustus	suffectus
c. 167	Tiberius Claudius Pompeianus	suffectus
167 or 168	Publius Caelius Optatus	suffectus
Between 168 and 170	Marcus Antonius Zeno	suffectus
169 or 170	Marcus Lucceius Torquatus Bassianus	suffectus
Between 169 and 175	Titus Varius Clemens	suffectus
Before 170	Marcus Valerius Bradua	suffectus
c. 170	Titus Flavius Claudius Sulpicianus	suffectus
c. 170	Quintius Junius Mauricus	suffectus
Between 170 and 174	Pollienus Auspex (maior)	suffectus
Between 170 and 175	Lucius Aemilius Carus	suffectus
Between 170 and 190	Tiberius Claudius Aristocles	suffectus
c. 172	Caerellius Priscus	suffectus
Between 172 and 176	Titus Flavius Claudius Sulpicianus II	suffectus
Between 172 and 176	Sulpicius Crassus	suffectus
c. 173	Gaius Arrius Antoninus	suffectus
c. 173	Manius Acilius Glabrio	suffectus
c. 173	Gaius Laberius Quartinus	suffectus
c. 173	Titus Rustius Caepio	suffectus
c. 173	Lucius Ulpius Marcellus	suffectus
c. 174	Publius Cornelius Anullinus	suffectus
c. 175	Gaius Vettius Sabinianus Julius Hospes	suffectus
c. 175	Marcus Macrinius Avitus Catonius Vindex	suffectus
c. 175/176	(?) Gaius Pantuleius Graptiacus	suffectus
c. 175/176	Sulpicius Crassus	suffectus
Between 175 and 180	Tiberius Julius Frugi	suffectus
Between 175 and 182	Lucius Albinius Saturninus	suffectus
c. 176	Lucius Vespronius Candidus Sallustius Sabinianus	suffectus
Between 177 and 180	Lucius Hedius Rufus Lollianus Avitus	suffectus
Between 177 and 181	Marcus Atilius Severus	suffectus
c. 178	Titus Licinnius Mucianus	suffectus
178 or 179	Aulus Julius Pompilius Piso Titus Vib[ius ...]tus Laevillius Berenicianus	suffectus
c. 180	Asellius Aemilianus	suffectus
c. 180	Lucius Saevinius Proculus	suffectus
Shortly after 180	Marcus Helvius Clemens Dextrianus	suffectus
Between 180 and 183	Gaius Pescennius Niger	suffectus
Between 180 and 185	(Marcus Gavius) Gallicanus	suffectus
Between 180 and 191	Quintus Licinius Nepos	suffectus
Between 180 and 192	Gaius Allius Fuscus	suffectus
Between 180 and 192	Gaius Julius Asper	suffectus
Between 180 and 192	Gaius Claudius Clemens Licinianus	suffectus
Between 180 and 192	Flavius Rufinianus	suffectus
Between 180 and 204	Marcus Antius Crescens Calpurnianus	suffectus
Between 180 and 211	Marcus Aemilius (Macer) Saturninus	suffectus
Between 180 and 211	Gaius Asinius (Protimus) Quadratus	suffectus
Before 182	Egnatius Capito	suffectus
c. 182	Lucius Ragonius Urinatius Larcius Quintianus	suffectus
Before 183	Gaius Domitius Dexter	suffectus
Before 183	(? Marcus) Antonius (? Ivvenis)	suffectus
Before 183	Cingius Severus	suffectus
Before 183	Severus	suffectus
183 or 184	(? Marcus) Cassius Apronianus	suffectus
Between 183 and 185	Marcus Asinius Rufinus Valerius Verus Sabinianus	suffectus
Between 183 and 196	M(---) Pin(---) Tiliu(---)	suffectus
Between 184 and 190	[...]mus Appius Claudius Lateranus	suffecti
Between 184 and 192	Gnaeus Suellius Rufus	suffecti
c. 185	Titus Aius Sanctus	suffectus
c. 185	Marcus Valerius Maximianus	suffectus
c. 185	Pollienus Auspex (minor)	suffectus
c. 185 or 186	Marcus Umbrius Primus	suffectus
Between 185 and 188	Decimus Clodius Septimius Albinus	suffectus
Between 185 and 192	Priscus; Clarus	suffecti
Before 186	Julius Lepidianus	suffectus
Before 186	Gaius Julius Saturninus	suffectus
c. 186	Quintus Hedius Rufus Lollianus Gentianus	suffectus
186 or 187	Minicius Opimianus	suffectus
Between 187 and 190	Tarius Titianus	suffectus
Between 186 and 190	Lucius Calpurnius Proculus	suffectus
Between 187 and 192	Aemilius Severus Cantabrinus	suffectus
c. 188	Cornelius Repentinus	suffectus
Between 188 and 190	Quintus Aurelius Polus Terentianus	suffectus
Between 188 and 193	Gaius Mat(t)ius Sabinius Sullinus Vatinianus Anicius Maximus Caesulenus Martialis Pisibanus Lepidus	suffectus
c. 190	Titus Flavius Carminius Athenagoras Claudianus	suffectus
c. 190	Claudius Stratonicus	suffectus
c. 190	Marcus Iuventius Caesianus	suffectus
c. 190	Marcus Iuventius Secundus	suffectus
Between 190 and 192	Quintus Larcius Euripianus	suffectus
c. 191	Publius Septimius Geta	suffectus
c. 192	Tiberius Claudius Gordianus	suffectus
c. 192	Gaius Memmius Fidus Julius Albius	suffectus
Before 193	(Aulus) Sellius Clodianus	suffectus
c. 193	Gaius Pomponius Bassus Terentianus	suffectus
c. 193 or 194	Titus Flavius Decimus	suffectus
193 or 194	Gaius Valerius Pudens	suffectus
Between 193 and 198	Marcus Claudius Demetrius	suffectus
Between 193 and 211	Betitius Pius Maximillianus	suffectus
Between 193 and 211	Gaius Julius Philippus	suffectus
Between 193 and 217	Quintus Virius Egnatius Sulpicius Priscus	suffectus
Between 193 and 217	Gaius Claudius Attalus Paterculianus	suffectus
Between 193 and 217	Tiberius Claudius Severus	suffectus
Between 193 and 217	Ulpius Leurus	suffectus
Between 193 and 235	Publius Attius Clementinus Rufinus	suffectus
Between 193 and 235	Gaius Asinius Nicomachus Julianus	suffectus
c. 194	Publius Aelius Severianus Maximus	suffectus
c. 194	Marcus Ulpius Arabianus	suffectus
195 or 196	Tiberius Claudius Candidus	suffectus
Between 195 and 197	Gaius Julius Scapula Lepidus Tertullus	suffectus
Before 196	Virius Lupus	suffectus
c. 196	Tiberius Manilius Fuscus	suffectus
c. 196	Tiberius Cl(audius) Modestus	suffectus
Before 197	Cosconius Gentianus	suffectus
c. 197	Gavius Tranquillus	suffectus
197 or 198	Gaius Caesonius Macer Rufinianus	suffectus
197 or 198	Sallustius Verginius G[allus]	suffectus
197 or 198	Quintus Venidius Rufus Marius Maximus Lucius Calvinianus	suffectus
Before 198	Ofilius Valerius Macedo	suffectus
Before 198	Gaius Ovinius Tertullus	suffectus
c. 198	Marcus Junius Concessus Aemilianus	suffectus
198 or 199	Mevius Surus	suffectus
198 or 199	Lucius Petronius Verus	suffectus
198 or 199	Titus Statilius Barbarus	suffectus
Between 198 and 204	Quintus Aiacius Modestus Crescentianus	suffectus
Between 198 and 235	[Publius Aelius Sec]undinus	suffectus
Before 199	Titus Arrius Bassianus	suffectus
c. 199	Tiberius Claudius Claudianus	suffectus
c. 199	Lucius Marius Maximus Perpetuus Aurelianus	suffectus
Late 2nd to early 3rd century	Lucius Cestius Gallus Cerrinius Justus Lutatius Natalis	designatus
Late 2nd to early 3rd century	Aulus Egnatius Proculus	suffectus
Late 2nd to early 3rd century	Gaius Bultius Geminius Titianus	suffectus
Late 2nd to early 3rd century	Cossinius Rufinus	suffectus

== 3rd century ==
Approximate Year	Consul(s)	Consul type
Early 3rd century	Lucius Calpurnius Reginianus	suffectus
Early 3rd century	Tiberius Claudius Telemachus	suffectus
Early 3rd century	Titus Flavius Damianus	suffectus
c. 200	Titus Flavius Titianus	suffectus
c. 200	Decimus Caelius Calvinus Balbinus	suffectus
c. 200	Gaius Julius Avitus Alexianus	suffectus
c. 200	(?) Claudius Hieronymianus	suffectus
(?) 203 or 204	Calpurnius Maximus	suffectus
203 to 205	Quintus Sicin(n)ius Clarus Pon(tianus?)	suffectus
204 or 205	Gaius Junius Faustinus (Pl)a(ci)dus Postumianus	suffectus
204 or 205	Ulpius Soter	suffectus
Before 205	Lucius Alfenus Senecio	suffectus
Before 205	Mevius Surus	suffectus
c. (?) 205	Lucius Claudius Cassius Dio Cocceianus	suffectus
Before 207	Lucius Egnatius Victor	suffectus
(?) 207	Marcus Clodius Pupienus Maximus	suffectus
c. between 208 and 210	Publius Catius Sabinus	suffectus
Before 210	Aelius Romanus	suffectus
Between 203 and 214	Lucius Marius Perpetuus	suffectus
Between 200 and 210	Appius Claudius Julianus	suffectus
circa 210	Tiberius Claudius Cleobulus	suffectus
210 or 211	Tiberius Claudius Subatianus Proculus	suffectus
Between 202 and (?) 211	(?) L. P. Postumus	suffectus
212 or 213	Gaius Julius Septimius Castinus	suffectus
Before 213	Quintus Junius (---) Quintianus	suffectus
Before 213	Gaius Jul(ius) Titi(anus)	suffectus
After 213	Armenius Peregrinus	suffectus
213 or 214	Sextus Furnius Julianus	suffectus
Between 210 and 220	Lucius Alfenus Avitianus	suffectus
Between 211 and 217	? Marcus Valerius Senecio	suffectus
215 or 216	Amicus	suffectus
(?) Before 217	Gaius Betitius Pius	suffectus
c. 217	Marcus Antonius Balbus	suffectus
Before 218	Fulvius Diogenianus	suffectus
c. 218	...atus	suffectus in absentia
c. 219	Quintus Egnatius Proculus	suffectus
Between 211 and 222	Quintus Flavius Balbus	suffectus
Between 212 and 222	Tiberius Julius Pollienus Auspex	suffectus in absentia
c. 222	Marcus Antonius Gordianus Sempronianus	suffectus
c. 222	Titus Flavius Aper Commodianus	suffectus
Before 222	Fulvius	suffectus
Between 222 and 235	Lucius Fulvius Gavius N[umisius] Aemilianus	suffectus
Before 223	Severus	suffectus
Between c. 222 and 226	Asinius Lepidus	suffectus
c. 225	Sabinianus	suffectus
c. 228	Flavius Aelianus	suffectus
Before 229	Maximus Attianus	suffectus
Before 230	(? Quintus or Sextus) Anicius Faustus Paulinus	suffectus
Between 220 and 230	(? Quintus or Claudius) Valerius Rufrius Justus	suffectus
Between 226 and 229	Lucius Caesonius Lucillus Macer Rufinianus	suffectus
Between 225 and 230	Lucius Egnatius Victor Lollianus	suffectus
Between 211 and 235	Gaius Asinius Protimus Quadratus	designatus
Between 230 and 240	Marcus Valerius Turbo	suffectus
c. 230	Marcus Ulpius Eubiotus Leurus	suffectus
Between 222 and 235	Claudius Sollemnius Pacatianus	suffectus
Between 222 and 235	Gaius Arrius Calpurnius Frontinus Honoratus	suffectus
(?) Between 222 and 235	Ostor(ius)	suffectus
(?) Between 222 and 235	Lucius Julius Apronius Maenius Pius Salamallianus	designatus
c. 230	Egnatius Victor Marinianus	suffectus
(?) Before 230	Iasdius Domitianus	suffectus
Between 231 and 235	Marcus Marius Titius Rufinus	suffectus
c. 235	Titus Clodius Pupienus Pulcher Maximus	suffectus
c. 235	Gaius Catius Clemens	suffectus
Between 234 and 238	Rutilius Pudens Crispinus	suffectus
Before 238	Publius Licinius Valerianus	suffectus
Before 238	Lucius Domitius Gallicanus Papinianus	suffectus
Early to mid 3rd century	Quintus Egnatius Proculus	suffectus
Between 238 and 244	Gaius Arrius Calpurnius Longinus	suffectus
c. 240	Publius Cornelius Saecularis	suffectus
(?) c. 240	Marcus Nummius Albinus	suffectus
c. 241	Lucius Catius Celer	suffectus in absentia
c. 242	Aspasius Paternus	suffectus
c. 243	Galerius Maximus	suffectus
c. 250	Titus Flavius Postumius Varus	suffectus
c. 250/252	Marcus Cocceius Anicius Faustus Flavianus	suffectus
Before 253	Titus Desticius Juba	suffectus
Before 257	Gaius Junius Donatus	suffectus
Before 258	Lucius Septimius Odaenathus	suffectus
c. 260	Lucius Caesonius Ovinius Manlius Rufinianus Bassus	suffectus
Before 275	Virius Lupus	suffectus
Between 253 and 264	Licinius Valerianus	suffectus
Between 260 and 268	Naulobatus	suffectus
Before 260/268	Sextus Cocceius Anicius Faustus Paulinus	suffectus
Before 262	Gaius Julius Sallustius Saturninus Fortunatianus	suffectus
Between 262 and 266	Censor II; Lepidus II	consul ordinarius (Gaul)
Between 262 and 266	Dialis; Bassus	consul ordinarius (Gaul)
Between 262 and 266	Apr[...] Ruf[...]	consul ordinarius (Gaul)
c. 265	Gaius Junius Tiberianus	suffectus
Before 267	Gaius Servilius Marsus	suffectus
Mid 3rd century	Gaius Memmius Caecilianus Placidus	suffectus
Before 269	Velleius Macrinus	suffectus
Between 267 and 270	Flavius Antiochianus	suffectus
c. 270	Lucius Julius Aurelius Septimius Vaballathus Athenodorus	suffectus
Before 275	Postumius Suagrus	suffectus
Before 275	Maecius Faltonius Nicomachus	suffectus
Mid to late 3rd century	Lucius Publius Petronius Volusianus	suffectus
Mid to late 3rd century	Marcus Pontius Eclectus Archelaus	suffectus
(?) Mid to late 3rd century	Lucius Turcius Faesasius Apronianus	suffectus
Mid 3rd to early 4th century	Lucius Suanius Victor Vitellianus	suffectus
(?) Late 3rd century	Aulus Caecina Tacitus	suffectus
(?) Late 3rd century	Gaius Lieurius Tranquillius Tocius Soaemus	suffectus
(?) Late 3rd to early 4th century	Titus Campanius Priscus Maximianus	suffectus
Late 3rd to early 4th century	Lucius Turcius Secundus	suffectus
Between 270 and 280	Sextus Anicius Faustus Paulinus	suffectus
c. 280	Gaius Caeionius Rufius Volusianus	suffectus
Before 286	Marcus Junius Maximus	suffectus
(?) 287	Marcus Aurelius Mausaeus Valerius Carausius	consul ordinarius (Britain)
Before c. 291	Titus Flavius Postumius Titianus	suffectus
Before 294	Gaius Macrinius Sossianus	suffectus
(?) Late 3rd to early 4th century	Egnatius Caeci... Antistius Luce. signo Aerius	suffectus
Unknown date 3rd century	Accius Iulianus Asclepianus	suffectus
End 3rd century	Ostorius Euhodianus	designatus

== 4th century ==
Approximate Year	Consul(s)	Consul type
Before 307	Attius Insteius Tertullus	suffectus
Before c. 335	Lucius Crepereius Madalianus	suffectus
Before 337	Gaius Caelius Censorinus	suffectus
Before 345	Marcus Nummius Albinus	suffectus
Before 350	Memmius Vitrasius Orfitus	suffectus
c. 378	Meropius Pontius Paulinus	suffectus
c. 386	Ragonius Vincentius Celsus	suffectus
Before 395/6	Quintilius Laetus	suffectus
During 4th century	Insteius Pompeianus	suffectus

== See also ==
- List of Roman consuls
- List of Roman consuls designate

== Sources ==
- Alföldy, Géza Konsulat und Senatorenstand unter der Antoninen Bonn: Rudolf Habelt Verlag (1977)
- Jones, A. H. M.; Martindale, J. R.; Morris, J. The Prosopography of the later Roman Empire, Vol. I, AD 260-395 (1971)
- Leunissen, Paul M. M. Konsuln und Konsulare in der Zeit von Commodus bis Severus Alexander (1989)
