= Egnatia gens =

Roman family

The gens Egnatia was a plebeian family of equestrian rank at ancient Rome. Only a few of the Egnatii held any magistracies, of whom the most important may have been Gnaeus Egnatius, who held the praetorship during the second century BC, and served as governor of Macedonia, shortly after its institution as a Roman province.

== Origin ==
The Egnatii were of Samnite origin, and at least some of them had settled at Teanum. At the end of the Social War, the greater part of these appear to have removed to Rome, where two of them were admitted into the senate, though a branch of the family seems to have remained at Teanum.

== Praenomina ==
The first of the Egnatii known to history bore the Oscan praenomina Gellius and Marius. The Egnatii who settled at Rome favoured Gnaeus, but also made use of Gaius, Lucius, Marcus, and Publius.

== Branches and cognomina ==
The Egnatii do not seem to have been divided into distinct families during the time of the Republic. Most of the Egnatii bore no cognomen, but individuals are known with the surnames Celer, Maximus, Rufus, and Veratius. Celer means "swift," while Maximus is "great" or "greatest." Rufus, meaning "red," was typically given to someone with red hair or a ruddy complexion.

== Members ==
This list includes abbreviated praenomina. For an explanation of this practice, see filiation.

- Gellius Egnatius, the leader of the Samnites in the Third Samnite War, which broke out in 298 BC. Three years later, he was slain in battle following the devotion of the consul Publius Decius Mus.
- Gnaeus Egnatius C. f., praetor before 146 BC, was appointed governor of Macedonia, in which capacity he began construction of a road from the Pindus Mountains to Thessalonica.
- Marius Egnatius, one of the principal leaders of the Italian allies in the Social War. Livius calls him the leader of the Samnites. In 90 BC, he captured Venafrum, and subsequently put the army of the consul Lucius Julius Caesar to flight. In the following year Egnatius was killed in battle against the praetors Gaius Cosconius and Lucceius.
- Gnaeus Egnatius, a man of somewhat disreputable character, was admitted into the Roman senate, but was subsequently expelled by the censors.
- Egnatius Cn. f., like his father a member of the Roman Senate, he retained that dignity when his father's name was struck off the rolls. He was disinherited by his father.
- Egnatius (Cn. n.), accompanied Marcus Licinius Crassus on his expedition against the Parthians, and after the great defeat which Crassus sustained at Carrhae, escaped from the scene of the disaster with three hundred horsemen.
- Gaius Egnatius Cn. f. Cn. n. Maximus, appears on several coins apparently struck during the time of Gaius Julius Caesar. He is probably the same Egnatius Maximus mentioned by Cicero in 45 BC, and the same Egnatius mentioned without any surname in one or two other passages of Cicero.
- Lucius Egnatius Rufus, an eques, and friend of Cicero, who carried on an extensive business as a farmer of the taxes, and a money-lender in the provinces. Both Cicero and his brother, Quintus, had pecuniary dealings with him. Cicero frequently recommends him to the governors of the provinces.
- Egnatius Sidicinus, mentioned by Cicero as having had some money transactions with him.
- Egnatii, father and son, were included in the proscription of the year 43 BC, and were slain by a single blow, while locked in each other's arms.
- Marcus Egnatius (L. f.) Rufus, aedile in 20 BC, and praetor the following year, in contravention of the laws; he sought the consulship of 18, but the consul Gaius Sentius Saturninus refused to receive his name as one of the candidates. He then joined a plot to murder Augustus, but was detected, imprisoned, and executed.
- Egnatius, a poet who wrote before Vergil. Macrobius quotes some lines from his poem, De Rerum Natura.
- Publius Egnatius Celer, a Stoic philosopher, who served as an informer under the emperor Nero. He was condemned to death during the reign of Vespasian.
- Egnatia Maximilla, a descendant of that branch of the Egnatia gens which bore the surname of Maximus, is mentioned by Tacitus as the wife of Publius Glitius Gallus, who was banished by the emperor Nero. She accompanied her husband in his exile.
- Gnaeus Egnatius Veratius, a Roman historian, mentioned only by Aurelius Victor.
- Marcus Egnatius Marcellinus, consul suffectus in 116.
- Egnatius Capito, consul suffectus, executed in 183.
- Marcus Egnatius Postumus, consul suffectus in 183.
- Quintus Egnatius Proculus, consul suffectus around 219.
- Quintus Egnatius Gallienus Perpetuus, vir consularis at Allifae during the first half of the third century.
- Lucius Egnatius Victor Lollianus, suffect consul.
- Quintus Flavius Maesius Egnatius Lollianus signo Mavortius, praefectus urbi of Rome in 342, consul in 355, and praetorian prefect of Illyricum in 355–356.
- Quintus Flavius Maesius Cornelius Egnatius Q. f. Severus Lollianus signo Mavortius junior, praetor triumfalis, mid-4th century.

== See also ==
- List of Roman gentes
