= Auspex =

An auspex, or augur, was an interpreter of omens in ancient Rome.

Auspex may also refer to:

- Auspex International, a London-based data analytics company
- Auspex Pharmaceuticals, an American pharmaceutical company acquired by Teva
- Auspex Systems, a defunct American computer storage company
- Auspex Terminal, a prediction market trading terminal

== Persons with the name ==
- Pollienus Auspex (consul under Commodus) (fl. 3rd century), Roman military officer, senator, and suffect consul
- Pollienus Auspex (consul under Marcus Aurelius) (fl. late 2nd century and early 3rd century), Roman military officer, senator, and suffect consul
- Tiberius Julius Pollienus Auspex (fl. 3rd century), Roman senator and suffect consul

== See also ==
- Haruspex
