= Pollia =

Pollia may refer to:

- Pollia (gastropod), a sea snail genus
- Pollia (plant), a plant genus
- Pollia gens, an ancient Roman family
- Pollia, a Roman tribe
