= Pierre Roualet =

French archaeologist (1931–2015)

- Born: 19 January 1931; Épernay, France
- Died: 28 October 2015 (aged 84); Épernay, France
- Occupations: Schoolteacher, archaeologist
- Known for: Protohistory of Champagne, La Tène chronology

Pierre Roualet (19 January 1931 – 28 October 2015) (Note: Jean-Jacques Charpy's obituary in Études Celtiques mistakenly gives Roualet's date of birth as 19 January 1930.) was a French archaeologist. A schoolteacher by profession, he became a specialist in the protohistory of Champagne and for many years ran the archaeological collections of the museum at Épernay. Working with Jean-Jacques Hatt and André Brisson, he published several of the region's La Tène cemeteries and helped to establish a regional chronology of the period.

== Early life ==
Roualet was born at Épernay, in the Marne, on 19 January 1931. He spent his early childhood there, but in 1938, his father being gravely ill, his parents sent him to the Creuse to be brought up by his mother's family, where he acquired the accent he kept for the rest of his life. A scholarship pupil, he passed his baccalauréat and returned to Épernay in 1949 to take up the post of primary schoolteacher, which he held until his retirement in 1986. Over that time he taught reading to more than 750 children of the town. He married in 1954 and, with his wife Jacqueline Déhu, had three children. Away from teaching he had two passions, choral singing, in which he sang bass for ten years, and archaeology.

== Archaeological career ==
Roualet's work as a schoolteacher brought him into contact with André Brisson (1902–1979), curator of the museum at Épernay, whose regular visits with his pupils led to a lasting friendship. From 1955 he contributed drawings to Brisson's publications, and through his reading and his close association with Jean-Jacques Hatt, then a young professor of national archaeology at the University of Strasbourg, he was gradually drawn into fieldwork and publication. The collaboration between the three men lasted a quarter of a century.

Roualet's interest turned to protohistory, the period most fully represented in the museum's collections. Brisson's excavations, begun in 1922, supplied the material, and the three set out to publish it. Roualet took part in fieldwork alongside Brisson at the cemetery of Villeneuve-Renneville, the late Roman cemetery of Aulnay-sur-Marne, the settlement of Aulnay-aux-Planches and a late Bronze Age settlement at Normée.

In 1966 Hatt set up a training excavation at the oppidum of Le Pègue in the Drôme, which ran until 1982. Roualet took charge of training the student excavators and of conserving the pottery, and over seventeen seasons he came to know the Celtic cultures of southern Gaul under the guidance of Charles Lagrand. In 1990 he took part in an excavation near Modena, in Italy, directed by Venceslas Kruta.

Roualet's work at the Épernay museum began in earnest in 1968, when Brisson fell ill. From Brisson's retirement in 1972 he had full charge of the collections and their scientific management, a responsibility he held until the end of 1982. He catalogued the whole of the early medieval collection, some 3,000 graves, together with the Louis Simonnet collection acquired in 1972. The closure of the museum's archaeology department in November 1995 was a severe blow to him.

Roualet's first papers appeared in the Revue archéologique de l'Est, and from 1967 he published mainly through the Société académique de la Marne, of which he was president from 1972 to 1976. In the publication of the Villeneuve-Renneville cemetery he advanced the hypothesis that the abandonment of the La Tène cemeteries of Champagne coincided with the movement of Gauls into northern Italy. With Hatt he published the cemetery of the Jogasses at Chouilly, and from 1983 he worked on a synthesis of the La Tène period in Champagne. The regional chronology he established with Hatt, later revised in collaboration with Michel Chossenot, is in Charpy's assessment still valid in its broad lines.

In 1985 Roualet was attached to the Centre d'études celtiques of the École normale supérieure and appointed to the Musée d'Archéologie nationale, where he was charged with cataloguing the Champagne holdings, in particular the collection of the Bosteaux brothers. His study of these holdings allowed him to define the chronology of the first half of the 4th century BC. About the same time he became a founder member of the Association française pour l'étude de l'âge du Fer. He promoted and co-organised an international colloquium at Épernay in 1987, and took part in the 1991 Épernay exhibition and the associated colloquium at Hautvillers, held in connection with the ninth International Congress of Celtic Studies at Paris.

Roualet was appointed a chevalier (1979) and then officier (1985) of the Ordre des Palmes Académiques, and a chevalier (1979) and officier (1994) of the Ordre national du Mérite.

After the death of his second son in 1996 Roualet gradually withdrew from his activities, and a few years later he gave up his post at the Musée d'Archéologie nationale along with his other commitments. In his last years he turned to the history of his own family, of which he wrote an account in 2006. Though he had no formal training in archaeology, his colleagues valued his common sense, intellectual honesty and capacity for work, and Venceslas Kruta placed him among those who had done most for the archaeology of Champagne and of the Celts over the previous half-century.

== Selected publications ==
- Brisson, André; Roualet, Pierre; Hatt, Jean-Jacques (1971). "Le cimetière gaulois La Tène Ia du Mont Gravet à Villeneuve-Renneville (Marne)". Mémoires de la Société d'agriculture, commerce, sciences et arts du département de la Marne. 86.
- Hatt, Jean-Jacques; Roualet, Pierre (1976). "Le cimetière des Jogasses en Champagne et les origines de la civilisation de La Tène". Revue archéologique de l'Est et du Centre-Est. 27.
- Charpy, Jean-Jacques; Roualet, Pierre (1987). Céramique peinte gauloise en Champagne du VIe au IIe siècle avant J.-C. Épernay: Musée d'Épernay.
