= Mussidia gens =

Ancient Roman family

The gens Mussidia was a minor plebeian family at ancient Rome. Few of the Mussidii attained the higher offices of the Roman state, although Titus Mussidius Pollianus obtained the consulship in the time of Caligula. Other members of this gens are known from inscriptions.

== Origin ==
The Mussidii appear to be of Paelignian origin, and may have been natives of Sulmo, which besides Rome is the only location in Italy where the name is found. The nomen Mussidius belongs to a large class of gentilicia formed using the suffix -idius. Most of these names were originally derived from cognomina ending in -idus, but such names were so numerous that -idius must have come to be regarded as a regular gentile-forming suffix, and was used to form nomina from names or words other than those ending in -idus.

== Praenomina ==
The only praenomina known from the senatorial Mussidii are Titus and Lucius. Gaius and Decimus are found in inscriptions. All but Decimus were very common throughout Roman history, while Decimus was favoured by a small number of families, mostly of plebeian origin.

== Branches and cognomina ==
The only cognomen associated with the main branch of the Mussidii is Longus, normally given to someone who was particularly tall. Pollianus, borne by two of the Mussidii, probably in the same branch as Longus, probably indicates descent from the Pollii through the female line. Optatus, found among a family of Mussidii in Spain, means "welcome" or "desired", while Proculus is an old praenomen that became a common surname.

== Members ==
This list includes abbreviated praenomina. For an explanation of this practice, see filiation.

=== Mussidii Longi ===
- Titus Mussidius, the father of Lucius Mussidius Longus.
- Lucius Mussidius T. f. Longus, a triumvir monetalis, known from numerous coins depicting Caesar and the triumvirs. He may have been killed in the Battle of Philippi.
- Lucius Mussidius, proconsul of Sicily under Augustus, perhaps the same man as the moneyer Longus.
- Titus Mussidius L. f., the father of Pollianus, and perhaps the son of Longus.
- Titus Mussidius T. f. L. n. Pollianus, (Note: Lucius in some sources, but Titus appears to be the correct praenomen.) governor of Gallia Narbonensis from AD 34 to 37, at the end of the reign of Tiberius. He was consul suffectus under Caligula, but the year is uncertain.
- Titus Mussidius T. f. T. n. Pollianus, (Note: His filiation names not only his father and grandfather, but his proavus as well, indicating that the consul Pollianus was probably the son of the proconsul Lucius.) quaestor during the reign of Nero.

=== Mussidii from inscriptions ===
- Gaius Mussidius T. f., named in an inscription from Sulmo in Samnium.
- Mussidia Salvia, named in an inscription from Sulmo, together with Gaius Mussidius Diogenes.
- Gaius Mussidius Diogenes, named in an inscription from Sulmo, together with Mussidia Salvia.
- Lucius Mussidius, named in an inscription from Sulmo.
- Gaius Mussidius Optatus, perhaps the father of Lucius and Gaius, named in an inscription from Gemella in Hispania Baetica.
- Lucius Mussidius C. f., named along with several family members in an inscription from Gemella in Hispania Baetica.
- Gaius Mussidius C. f., named along with several family members in an inscription from Gemella in Hispania Baetica.
- Decimus Mussidius Proculus, a centurion with the fifth legion, named in a votive inscription from Sirakovo in Moesia Inferior.
- Decimus Mussidius, the former master of Decimus Mussidius Ariates and Decimus Mussidius Salvius.
- Decimus Mussidius D. l. Ariates, a freedman mentioned in an inscription from Rome.
- Decimus Mussidius D. l. Salvius, a freedman mentioned in an inscription from Rome.

== See also ==
- List of Roman gentes

== Bibliography ==
- Dictionary of Greek and Roman Biography and Mythology, William Smith, ed., Little, Brown and Company, Boston (1849).
- Theodor Mommsen et alii, Corpus Inscriptionum Latinarum (The Body of Latin Inscriptions, abbreviated CIL), Berlin-Brandenburgische Akademie der Wissenschaften (1853–present).
- René Cagnat et alii, L'Année épigraphique (The Year in Epigraphy, abbreviated AE), Presses Universitaires de France (1888–present).
- George Davis Chase, "The Origin of Roman Praenomina", in Harvard Studies in Classical Philology, vol. VIII (1897).
- Paul von Rohden, Elimar Klebs, & Hermann Dessau, Prosopographia Imperii Romani (The Prosopography of the Roman Empire, abbreviated PIR), Berlin (1898).
- A. L. F. Rivet, Gallia Narbonensis, Batsford, London (1988).
- John C. Traupman, The New College Latin & English Dictionary, Bantam Books, New York (1995).
- T.P. Wiseman, "Some Republican Senators and Their Tribes", in Classical Quarterly, vol. 14, pp. 122–133 (1964).
