= Jean-Jacques Hatt =

French archaeologist (1913–1997)

- Born: 3 March 1913; Paris, France
- Died: 10 January 1997 (aged 83); Zellwiller, France
- Citizenship: French
- Known for: Chronology of French protohistory, archaeology and religion of Roman Gaul
- Scientific career
- Fields: Archaeology, history
- Institutions: University of Strasbourg
- Doctoral advisor: Albert Grenier

Jean-Jacques Hatt (3 March 1913 – 10 January 1997) was a French archaeologist and historian who specialised in Celtic and Roman Gaul. For much of his career he held three posts at Strasbourg at once: director of antiquities for Alsace and Moselle, curator of the city's archaeological museum, and holder of the chair of national antiquities at the University of Strasbourg. He worked on the chronology of French protohistory and on the archaeology and religion of Roman Gaul, and he was president of the Société préhistorique française in 1963.

== Early life and education ==
Hatt was born in Paris in 1913 into a family with strong historical interests. His father, Jacques Hatt, was the author of several works on Strasbourg in the 15th to 17th centuries and of a genealogy of the Hatt family. The young Hatt developed an early taste for museums, history and research. His acquaintance with Robert Forrer, curator of the prehistoric and Gallo-Roman museum of Strasbourg, strengthened his interest in archaeology, and he took part in early excavations at Dachstein and Heiligenberg in Alsace, as well as at Mas-d'Azil and in other parts of France.

Hatt gained the agrégation in grammar. In 1937 he married Suzanne Trocmé, a painter and engraver, with whom he had four children between 1938 and 1949. On the suggestion of Albert Grenier, then professor at the University of Strasbourg, he began research on the Gallo-Roman tomb, which he defended as a doctoral thesis in 1951.

== Career ==
Hatt began his teaching career in 1937 as a grammar master at the Lycée Kléber in Strasbourg. After being demobilised he spent a period in the Lot, where he carried out his first work on protohistory, before taking up a teaching post at Clermont-Ferrand. He taught there from 1941 to 1945 and directed excavations at Gergovia and Aulnat.

In June 1945 he returned to Strasbourg, where he was appointed director of the archaeological district of Alsace and Moselle, a post he held until 1970. At the same time he took charge of the recently reclassified archaeological museum, and he held the chair of national antiquities at the University of Strasbourg, where he taught until 1982. He edited the journal Cahiers alsaciens d'archéologie, d'art et d'histoire. Hatt was elected president of the Société préhistorique française in 1963.

== Work ==
Although he was first known as a specialist of the Gallo-Roman period, Hatt also worked to promote the study of protohistory, that is the Metal Ages, whose importance he had observed in neighbouring Germany. He excavated in Lower Alsace, at Strasbourg and in Champagne, the last in the company of the archaeologist A. Brisson. He assisted René Joffroy at Mont Lassois, including in the discovery of the princely tomb at nearby Vix.

His research on the chronology of protohistory, carried out in Champagne with Pierre Roualet, was regarded as innovative, and with Charles Lagrand he directed for many years a training excavation on the protohistoric oppidum of Le Pègue in the Drôme.

Hatt devoted much of his later work to the Roman period. In 1966 he published a synthesis, Histoire de la Gaule romaine, and in 1980 a study of Roman Strasbourg. He then turned to the art and religion of the Celts and the Gallo-Romans, publishing the first volume of Mythes et dieux de la Gaule in 1989. The work set out his own reconstruction of Gaulish religion, drawn from the interpretation of Celtic and Gallo-Roman art. A second volume, left unfinished at his death, was later assembled from his notes and published by his family.

== Selected publications ==
- Hatt, Jean-Jacques (1951). La Tombe gallo-romaine: recherches sur les inscriptions et les monuments funéraires gallo-romains des trois premiers siècles de notre ère (in French). Paris: Presses universitaires de France.
- Hatt, Jean-Jacques (1953). Strasbourg au temps des Romains. Petite collection alsacienne (in French).
- Hatt, Jean-Jacques (1959). Histoire de la Gaule romaine (120 avant J.-C. – 451 après J.-C.): colonisation ou colonialisme? (in French). preface by Jérôme Carcopino. Paris: Payot. (2nd ed. 1966)
- Hatt, Jean-Jacques (1964). Sculptures antiques régionales: Musée archéologique de Strasbourg (in French). Paris: Éditions des Musées nationaux.
- Hatt, Jean-Jacques (1966). Sculptures gauloises: esquisse d'une évolution de la sculpture en Gaule depuis le VIe siècle av. J.-C. jusqu'au IVe siècle après J.-C (in French). Paris: Les Éditions du Temps.
- Hatt, Jean-Jacques (1970). Celtes et Gallo-Romains (in French). Geneva: Nagel.
- Hatt, Jean-Jacques (1989). Mythes et dieux de la Gaule (in French). Vol. 1: Les Grandes divinités masculines. Paris: Picard. ISBN 2-7084-0365-6.
- Hatt, Jean-Jacques (1993). Argentorate-Strasbourg (in French). Lyon: Presses universitaires de Lyon.
