= Mirebeau-sur-Bèze =

- Commune
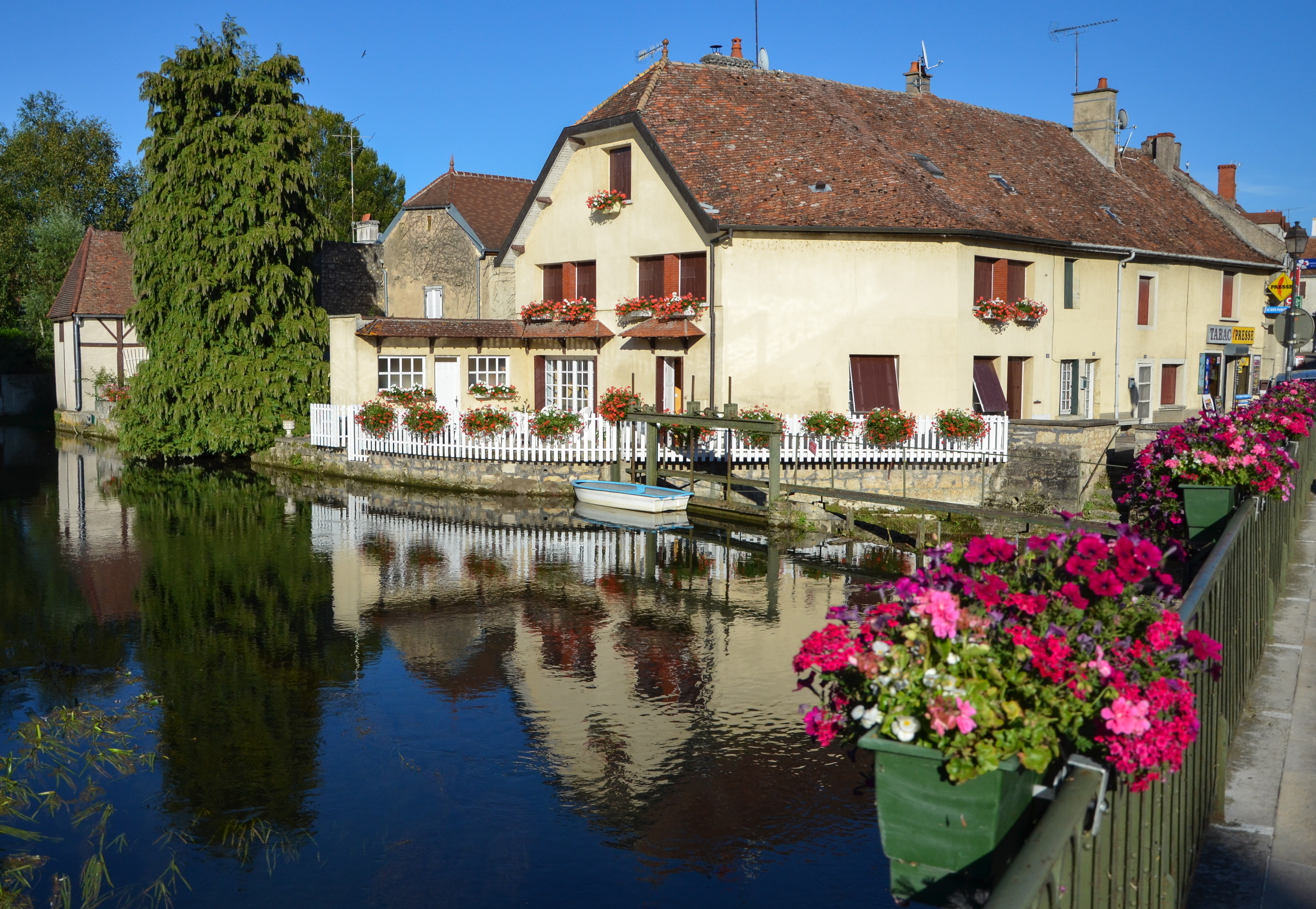
- The Bèze riverside at Mirebeau-sur-Bèze

- Coat of arms
- Location of Mirebeau-sur-Bèze
- Location within France Location within Bourgogne-Franche-Comté
- Coordinates: 47°23′59″N 5°19′09″E
- Country: France
- Region: Bourgogne-Franche-Comté
- Department: Côte-d'Or
- Arrondissement: Dijon
- Canton: Saint-Apollinaire

Government
  - Mayor (2020–2026): Laurent Thomas
- Area^{1}: 22.19 km^{2} (8.57 sq mi)
- Elevation: 199 m (653 ft)
- Highest elevation: 250 m (820 ft)
- Lowest elevation: 193 m (633 ft)
- Population (2023): 1,919
  - Density: 86.48/km^{2} (224.0/sq mi)
- Time zone: UTC+01:00 (CET)
  - Summer (DST): UTC+02:00 (CEST)
- INSEE/Postal code: 21416 /21310
- ^{1} French Land Register data, which excludes lakes, ponds, glaciers > 1 km^{2} (0.386 sq mi or 247 acres) and river estuaries.

Mirebeau-sur-Bèze (French pronunciation: [miʁbo syʁ bɛz], literally Mirebeau on Bèze, before 1993: Mirebeau) is a commune in the Côte-d'Or department in eastern France.

Mirebeau is the site of a monumental castrum or fortress for about 5000 Roman legionaries. Extensive aerial reconnaissance and excavations since 1964 have shown the extent of the site and its presence of Legio VIII Augusta. The large camp had stone ramparts with towers, gates, principia (headquarters) with monumental entrance, storehouses, thermae (thermal baths), an amphitheatre whose embankments are still visible, and a wharf on the river Bèze. The fort was surrounded by a V-shaped ditch, and later two more ditches were dug on two of the sides.

Tile stamps of the VIIIth Legion show that the camp was built in 70 AD, when the legion arrived with Vespasian in Gaul to oppose the revolts of the Treveri and especially the Ubii and Lingones against Rome. The legion left in 86 at the latest to its next base at Argentoratum (now Strasbourg).

Civil canabae built-up outside the fortress and continued after the army left at the crossroads of ancient roads on the site of the present village, becoming a substantial settlement. A theatre was restored by a Roman citizen's daughter when it was falling into ruin. Upstream an important Celtic and later Gallo-Roman sanctuary had developed.

Other buildings around the fortress included a mansio, a kind of hotel for state officials.

An underground aqueduct supplying the fortress has been excavated.

== Population ==
Historical population
Year	Pop.	±% p.a.
1968	1,004	—
1975	1,107	+1.40%
1982	1,426	+3.68%
1990	1,464	+0.33%
1999	1,573	+0.80%
2007	1,880	+2.25%
2012	2,050	+1.75%
2017	2,083	+0.32%
2023	1,919	−1.36%
Source: INSEE

== See also ==
- Communes of the Côte-d'Or department
