= Marius Maximus =

Roman consul and historian (c.160 – c.230)

Lucius Marius Maximus Perpetuus Aurelianus (more commonly known as Marius Maximus) (c. AD 160 – c. AD 230) was a Roman biographer, writing in Latin, who in the early decades of the 3rd century AD wrote a series of biographies of twelve Emperors, imitating and continuing Suetonius. Marius's work is lost, but it was still being read in the late 4th century and was used as a source by writers of that era, notably the author of the Historia Augusta. The nature and reliability of Marius's work, and the extent to which the earlier part of the HA draws upon it, are two vexed questions among the many problems that the HA continues to pose for students of Roman history and literature.

== Career ==
It is more or less agreed that Marius Maximus the biographer is identical with one of the most successful senators of the Severan dynasty whose career is known from inscriptions, namely Lucius Marius Maximus Perpetuus Aurelianus, twice consul and once Prefect of the City of Rome. His family may have hailed from Africa and was not senatorial; his father, L. Marius Perpetuus, was an Equestrian procurator in Gaul but evidently secured entry to the senatorial order for his son as a novus homo.

Probably born about 160 AD, Marius Maximus’ military career began in the reign of Marcus Aurelius, when he was Tribunus laticlavius of the Legio XXII Primigenia. Around 178 to 180, he held the same rank in the Legio III Italica. During Marcus Aurelius’ reign, he was also one of the quattuorviri viarum curandarum (or officer in charge of the roads outside of the walls of Rome). Around AD 182/183, Marius Maximus was the quaestor urbanus before being nominated as a candidate for the office of Plebeian Tribune.

He became a senator under Commodus, and was adlected into the praetorship. Around AD 190, Marius Maximus was the curator of the Via Latina before becoming curator rei publicae of Faventia. In 193, when Septimius Severus seized power, he was the Legatus legionis of Legio I Italica on the lower Danube and was involved in the campaign against Pescennius Niger. Then sometime between 193 and 196 he was the dux exercitus of Moesia and Byzantium.

In 197, Marius Maximus was the dux exercitus of Moesia and Lugdunum. It was during this time he fought at the Battle of Lugdunum against Clodius Albinus, after which he was appointed Legatus Augusti pro praetore (or governor) of Gallia Belgica, which he held probably until AD 199. Probably during the last year of his governorship, he held his first consulship as suffect consul (c. AD 199 or 200). His next posting was as Legatus Augusti pro praetore of Germania Inferior, followed by the imperial governorship of Coele-Syria, probably from 205 until 208.

Then, between the years 213 and 217, Marius Maximus became the first ex-consul ever to hold both the Proconsulship of Asia, and that of Africa, in succession. The order is not certain, although it is more likely that he held the governorship of Africa from 213/214, followed by the governorship of Asia from 215 to 216. Regardless, it was unprecedented to hold both Proconsulships, as either one of which conventionally crowned a senator's career. Further, he held the proconsular governorship of Asia for two consecutive years, which was also extraordinary. This suggests he was held in great esteem by Caracalla.

His career continued after Caracalla's murder, with his appointment as Praefectus urbi of Rome, by Macrinus in 218, which he held until 219. Although he held no post during the reign of Elagabalus, under Alexander Severus he was made consul for a second time in AD 223, alongside Lucius Roscius Aelianus Paculus Salvius Julianus.

Christian Settipani believes that Marius Maximus was married to Cassia Marciana, sister of Cassius Dio, another prominent historian. Together, they had a son, Lucius Marius Maximus, who was consul in AD 232. Marius also had a brother who was a suffect consul around AD 203, Lucius Marius Perpetuus.

== The biographies ==
It is not known for certain when Marius wrote his work, apparently entitled Caesares, but presumably towards the end of his career. It was intended as a continuation of the Twelve Caesars of Suetonius, and apparently covered the next twelve reigns, from Nerva to that of Elagabalus. As an eyewitness who experienced at least seven of these reigns from positions of authority, Maximus could have taken up the writing of history like his contemporary Dio Cassius, but he preferred the anecdotal and, indeed, frivolous forms of biography. His writings come in for adverse criticism from Jerome, Ammianus Marcellinus, and also the anonymous author of the Historia Augusta, who nevertheless cites him directly at least twenty-six times (apparently in most cases quoting or summarizing passages from Marius's lost work) and probably uses him in many places elsewhere. Marius's intention seems to have been to follow and out-perform Suetonius in serving up gossip, spicy details of the Emperors’ private lives, cynical comments, scandalous anecdotes, and curiosa. He also quoted from letters, senatorial edicts and so on, but seems to have invented some of these – a practice which the HA author adopted with enormous enthusiasm and bravura. However his work, sensationalist or not, must have contained much valuable information. The HA’s narration of the assassination of Elagabalus, well told and full of authentic-seeming circumstantial detail, is generally considered to derive from Marius Maximus.

== Marius and the Historia Augusta ==
There has long been a school of thought that holds that the lives of the Emperors Hadrian to Elagabalus in the HA employ Marius as their primary source material. Anthony Birley has recently offered the most detailed defense of this position. There is however a contrary view, most convincingly put by Sir Ronald Syme, who points out that all the passages in which Marius is cited by name can be shown to be interpolations in the author’s main narrative, brought in to provide colour, frivolous anecdote or critical comment. Examples include the meat dish (tetrafarmacum) that Aelius Verus invented, Hadrian’s supposed expertise in astrology, various stories to the discredit of Marcus Aurelius and his consort Faustina the Younger, the Senate’s craven catalogue of acclamations for Commodus, and so on. It is more likely in Syme's opinion that Marius was a secondary source, and that the HA author was following in the main a more sober source, ‘Ignotus, the Good Biographer’.

== See also ==
- Maria gens

== Fragments and Testimonia ==
- Peter, HRR (1906) clxxx ff.; 121 ff.

== Sources ==
- Anthony Birley, "Marius Maximus: The Consular Biographer," ANRW II.34.3 (1997) 2678–2757.
- Inge Mennen, Power and Status in the Roman Empire, AD 193-284 (BRILL, 2011)
- Sir Ronald Syme, Ammianus and the Historia Augusta (Oxford, 1968)
- Sir Ronald Syme, Emperors and Biography (Oxford, 1971)

Political offices
Preceded by Uncertain	Consul suffectus of the Roman Empire around AD 199/200	Succeeded by Uncertain
Preceded by Elagabalus, and Alexander Severus	Consul of the Roman Empire; 223 with Luscius Roscius Aelianus Paculus Salvius Julianus	Succeeded by Appius Claudius Julianus, and Gaius Bruttius Crispinus
