= Legio XVI Flavia Firma =

Roman legion

Map of the Roman Empire in AD 125 under emperor Hadrian, showing the Legio XVI Flavia Firma stationed on the river Euphrates at Samosata (Samsat, Turkey), in the Roman province of Syria, where it was stationed from AD 117 until the 4th century

Legio XVI Flavia Firma ("Steadfast Flavian Sixteenth Legion") was a legion of the Imperial Roman army. The legion was created by Emperor Vespasian in 70 from the remains of the XVI Gallica (which had surrendered in the Batavian rebellion). The unit still existed in the 4th century, when it guarded the Euphrates border and camped in Sura (Syria). The emblem of the legion was a Pegasus, although earlier studies assumed it to have been a lion.

== History ==
Legio XVI Flavia Firma was raised by Emperor Vespasian in AD 70 using the loyal remnants of Legio XVI Gallica, which had surrendered during the Batavian Rebellion. To restore the legion's reputation, Vespasian gave it the cognomen Flavia Firma ("Steadfast Flavian") and assigned it a new emblem, the Pegasus, replacing the former legionary symbol.

The legion was initially stationed at Satala in Cappadocia to guard the eastern frontier against the Parthian Empire. Under Emperor Trajan, units of XVI Flavia Firma participated in the Parthian War (114–117 AD), after which Emperor Hadrian permanently relocated the legion's headquarters south to Samosata on the Euphrates in Syria. The legion remained stationed at Samosata for over two centuries, participating in Marcus Aurelius's Parthian campaigns and later serving under Septimius Severus against the Sasanian Empire. According to the Notitia Dignitatum, units of XVI Flavia Firma were still guarding the Syrian border at Sura into the 4th century.

== Attested members ==
Name	Rank	Time frame	Province	Source
Lucius Cornelius Pusio Annius Messalla	legatus	before 70		CIL VI, 37056
Lucius Domitius Apollinaris	legatus	c. 84-87		IGR III.558 = TAM II.569
Lucius Neratius Proculus	legatus	c. 138		CIL IX, 2457
Gaius Septimius Severus	legatus	c. 155		
Lucius Fabius Cilo	legatus	between 180 and 184		CIL VI, 1408 = ILS 1141; CIL VI, 1409 = ILS 1142
Lucius Marius Perpetuus	legatus	after 200		CIL III, 1178 = ILS 1165; CIL III, 6709 = ILS 5899
Publius Tullius Varro	tribunus laticlavius	110/115		CIL XI, 3364
Marcus Accenna Helvius Agrippa	tribunus laticlavius	2nd century		CIL II, 1262

== See also ==
- List of Roman legions
