= Lucius Neratius Proculus =

Roman senator

Lucius Neratius Proculus was a Roman senator, who held several posts in the emperor's service. He was suffect consul in either the year 144 or 145. Proculus is known primarily from inscriptions.

He is a member of the gens Neratia, whose origins were in Saepinum. Although he bears the praenomen Lucius, the same as Lucius Neratius Marcellus (suffect consul in 95 and ordinary consul in 129) and Lucius Neratius Priscus (suffect consul in 97), Proculus is the son of a Gaius Neratius. Proculus is also known to have a sister, Neratia Procilla, who married one Gaius Betitius Pietas, a notable of Aeclanum; their son and Proculus' nephew was Gaius Neratius Proculus Betitius Pius Maximillianus.

== Life ==
His cursus honorum is known from a dedication to a statue raised by his fellow citizens at Saepium. The earliest office Proculus is attested as holding was in the decemviri stlitibus judicandis, one of the four boards that formed the vigintiviri; membership in one of these four boards was a preliminary and required first step toward gaining entry into the Roman Senate. He served two commissions as military tribune: first with Legio VII Gemina then stationed at Legio (modern León); next with Legio VIII Augusta in Argentorate (modern Strasbourg), in Germania Superior. His next recorded office was quaestor, and upon completion of this traditional Republican magistracy Proculus would be enrolled in the Senate. The traditional Roman republican magistracies of aedile and praetor followed, without distinction.

His first praetorian post was as legatus legionis or commander of Legio XVI Flavia Firma, then stationed at Samosata in Commagene; Géza Alföldy dates his commission to around the year 138. As Proculus was close to Syria, he was ordered to lead vexillationes against the Parthians; Mireille Corbier dates this military campaign to 139 or shortly thereafter. This show of force impressed Vologases III, who provisionally renounced his designs on Armenia.

On his return, Proculus was appointed as prefect of the aerarium militare, which lead him directly to the consulate. As prefect he may have been either the colleague or successor of Salvius Julianus. Corbier notes that if Proculus were Julianus' colleague, his ascent through the senatorial ranks would have been rapid, and Proculus would have been consul in 144; if Proculus succeeded Julianus, his advancement was slower and he would have been consul in 148.

The life of Neratius Proculus is a blank after his consulate.
