= Legio VIII Augusta =

Imperial Roman legion

Map of the Roman Empire in AD 125, under emperor Hadrian, showing the Legio VIII Augusta, stationed on the river Rhine at Argentorate (Strasbourg, France), in Germania Superior province, from AD 75 to at least 371

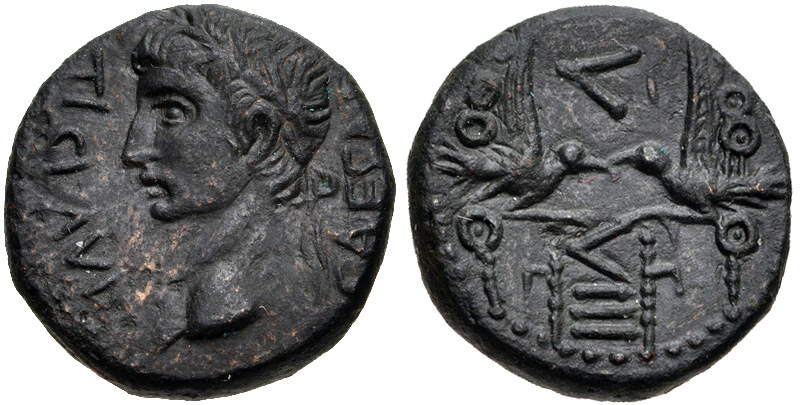
Coin showing Claudius and Aquila of the V and VIII legions

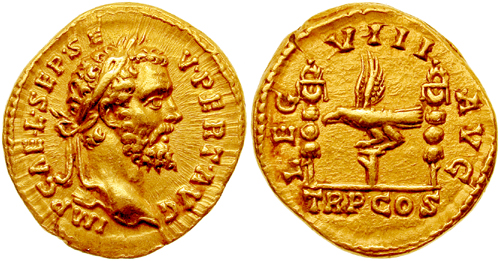
Aureus struck in 193 by Septimius Severus to celebrate VIII Augusta, one of the legions supporting his fight for purple.

Legio VIII Augusta ("Augustus' Eighth Legion") was one of the oldest legions of the Imperial Roman army.

== In republican service ==
They were ordered to Cisalpine Gaul around 58 BC by Julius Caesar and marched with him throughout the entirety of the Gallic Wars, especially during the battles of Gergovie and Alesia. During the war the legion won the title "Gallica." It also earned a reputation for courage.

They stood with him at the Battle of Pharsalus. The legion was also present in Egypt, when Caesar captured Egypt for Cleopatra. In 46 BC, it took part in the Battle of Thapsus near what is now Bakalta, Tunisia shortly before their disbandment.

In 44 BC, Octavian reconstituted the legion that had helped him attain the control of the Roman Empire. In 43 BC it took part in the siege of the Battle of Mutina (current Modena) by Marc Antony, defended by the troops of Decimus Brutus, which earned Legio VIII Gallica the nickname "Mutinensis".

== In imperial service ==
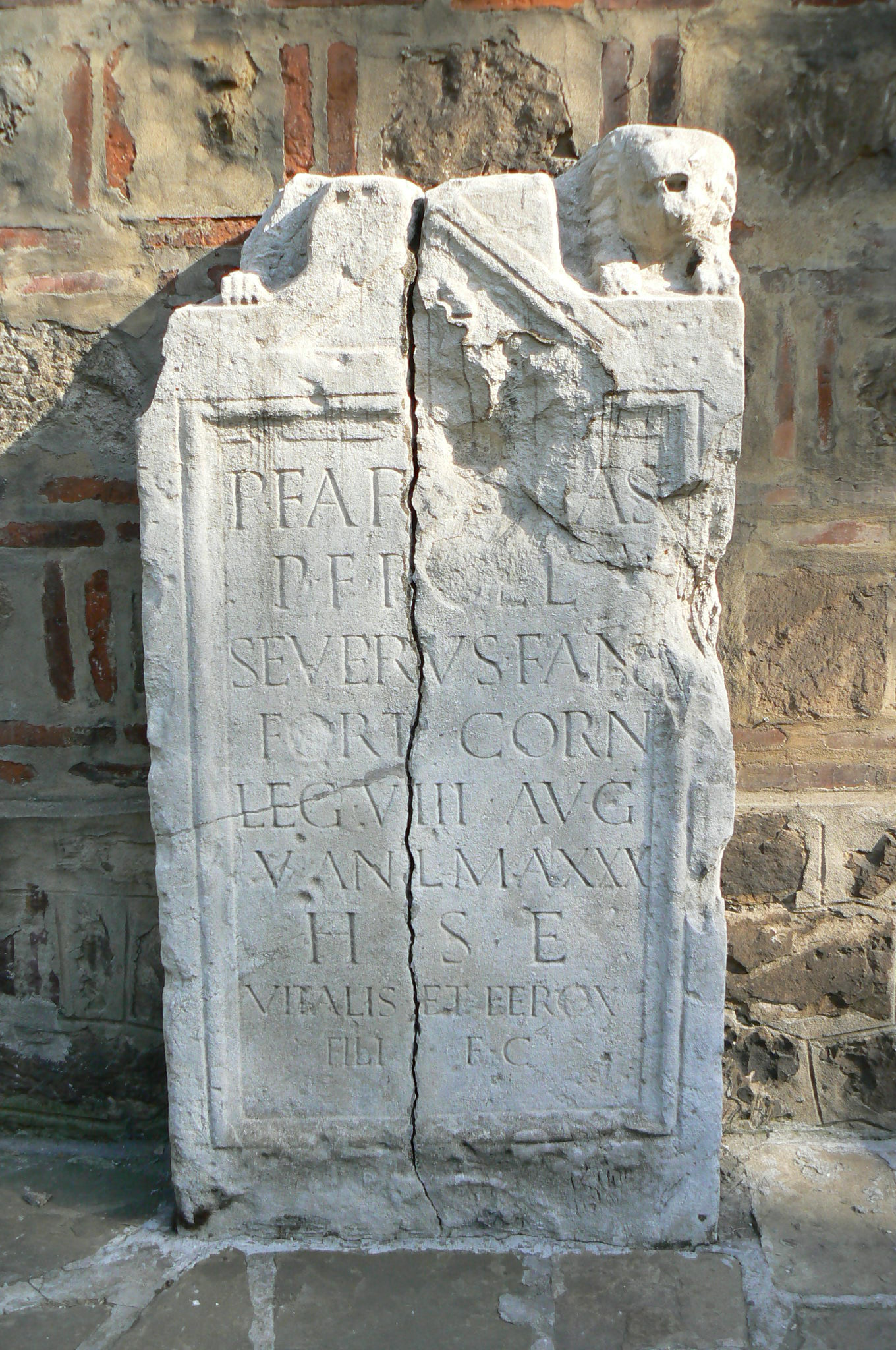
Tombstone of Publius Farfinias Severus from the VIII Augusta from Novae legionary camp (Archaeological Museum of Sofia). He was a soldier and musician of the legion and an Italian from Fanum Fortunae

In or before 9 AD the legion was transferred to Poetovium (modern Ptuj). The legion must have won a victory around this time that earned them the cognomen Augusta. At least a detachment also stayed in Burnum, Illyricum where their stamped tiles have been found.

Around 45 under Claudius, the VIII Augusta took part in the suppression of the Thracian uprising, and founded its castrum at Novae where the Danube has its most southern bend and from where the legion controlled a long section of the river.

The legion received the title "BIS AUGUSTA" (twice August) for their actions in Thrace. After Nero's death in 69 it gave up this title and in the confusion of the Year of the Four Emperors, the legion voted for Otho and sent a detachment of 2000 men to Italy (as did the 7th and the 3rd legions). Soon after Otho's death, the Danube legions voted for Vespasian and went with him to Mirebeau-sur-Bèze in Gaul where it built its new base in 70 to oppose the revolts of the Treveri and especially the Ubii and Lingones against Rome.

After restoration of Rome`s rule in the North in or before 86, the legion moved to its new headquarters at Argentoratum in Germania Superior (now Strasbourg), where the main part of the unit was stationed until the 5th century.

The legion also fought the Parthian Empire with Septimius Severus, who ruled from 193 until 211, and with his successors.

Records indicate that they were still active during the first years of the fourth century at the Rhine frontier. This means that the history of the legion covers more than 400 years of almost continuous service. In 371 it was again stationed in Argentoratum, according to an inscription. Later, the Roman general Stilicho, was compelled to move the German legions back to Italy to defend it against the Visigothic invasion.

According to Notitia Dignitatum, around 420 an Octaviani unit was under the Magister Peditum of Italia; it is possible that this unit was the old VIII Augusta, which was originally a comitatensis unit but had been promoted to palatina status.

== Attested members ==
Name	Position	Year	Location	Reference
Numisius Lupus	legatus legionis	69	Germania	Tacitus, Histories, III.10
Lucius Antistius Rusticus	legatus legionis	79/81	Germania	
Marcus Acilius Priscus Egrilius Plarianus	legatus legionis	c. 120	Germania	CIL XIV, 155,CIL XIV, 4444
Lucius Varus Ambibulus	legatus legionis	c. 162	Germania	CIL X, 3872
Marcus Juventius Caesianus	legatus legionis	c. 186	Germania	
Publius Aelianus Coeranus	legatus legionis	221/223?	Germania	CIL XIV, 03586
Aulus Egnatius Proculus	legatus legionis	190/235	Germania	CIL VI, 01406 = ILS 1167
Gnaeus Petronius Probatus Junior Justus	legatus legionis	c. 234	Germania	CIL X, 1254
Quintus Petronius Melior	legatus legionis	3rd century	Germania	CIL XI, 3367
Lucius Coiedius Candidus	tribunus laticlavius	before 55	Germania	CIL XI, 6163
Sextus Sentius Caecilianus	tribunus laticlavius	c. 65	Germania	CIL IX, 4194 = ILS 8969
Decimus Terentius Gentianus	tribunus laticlavius	before 106	Germania	TLMN4, 4
Lucius Aemilius Carus	tribunus laticlavius	c. 125	Germania	CIL VI, 1333
Lucius Neratius Proculus	tribunus laticlavius	c. 128	Germania	CIL IX, 2457 = ILS 1076
Lucius Cestius Gallus	tribunus laticlavius	between 150 and 175	Germania	CIL X, 3722
Titus Vettius Deciminus	veteranus legionis	early 3rd century		CIL XIII, 1903
Firmidius Severinus		c. 175–201	Gallia	CIL XII, 2587

== Epigraphic inscriptions ==
- ri[…] G̣allorum tribunus militum legionis VIII Augustae. Cohort of Gauls, military [tribune] of the Eighth Legion Augusta. Brougham (Brocavum). CIL VII 300 = RIB 782.

== See also ==
- List of Roman legions
