= Maecilius Fuscus =

Maecilius Fuscus was a propraetor under Gordian III, he served as governor of Britannia Inferior, a province of Roman Britain some time between AD 238 and 244. Little else is known of him although he seems to have been involved in the rebuilding and expansion of the fort at Durham along with his successor, Egnatius Lucilianus as inscriptions of him appear in Lanchester, Durham. Fuscus may have been the ancestor of the consul of 332 AD Maecilius Hilarianus as well as the emperor Avitus.

== See also ==
- Maecilia gens
