= Lucius Marcius Celer Marcus Calpurnius Longus =

2nd century Roman senator, consul and soldier

Lucius Marcius Celer Marcus Calpurnius Longus was a Roman senator, who was active during the second century AD. He was suffect consul in the last nundinium of 144 with Decimus Velius Fidus as his colleague. Longus is known entirely from inscriptions.

There has been a disagreement over the evidence of Calpurnius Longus' life since Edmund Groag first set forth the facts of his existence in the last book he wrote, a prosopography of the proconsuls of Achaea. The most recent investigation of his life was by Giuseppe Camodeca, who established a time line of his life up to his suffect consulship, which he dated to 148. Unfortunately, Camodeca was unaware that Werner Eck had published a military diploma that securely dated Calpurnius Longus' tenure as suffect consul to 144. Accordingly, all dates taken from Camodeca's article for Calpurnius Longus' life below are adjusted four years earlier.

The earliest office attested for Calpurnius Longus was quattuorviri viarum curandarum, or one of the four overseers of street maintenance in Rome, one of the magistracies that comprised the vigintiviri; membership in one of these four boards was a preliminary and required first step toward a gaining entry into the Roman Senate. This is dated as between the years 117 and 120. He is next attested as military tribune of Legio I Italica, which was stationed at the time in Moesia; this is dated between the years 121 and 125. We can conclude Calpurnius Longus was appointed quaestor, for completion of this traditional Republican magistracy was the usual manner men were enrolled in the Roman Senate. Although we can safely surmise he held the next two steps of the traditional Republican magistracies -- either plebeian tribune or aedile, then praetor -- where his next attested office, legatus proconsularis or assistant to the proconsul, of Bithynia and Pontus fit in: although during the second century the duties legatus proconsularis was often assumed after a Senator was praetor, there are examples of men assuming these duties before acceding to that rank. Nonetheless, it is estimated Calpurnius Longus was legatus proconsularis around 136 and that he was proconsul of Achaea, his last attested position before his consulate, around 140.

Political offices
Preceded by ignotus, and Quintus Laberius Licinianus as suffect consuls	Suffect consul of the Roman Empire; 144 with Decimus Velius Fidus	Succeeded by Imp. Caesar Titus Aelius Hadrianus Antoninus Augustus Pius IV, and Marcus Aurelius Caesar II as ordinary consuls
