= Tiberius Pollienus Armenius Peregrinus =

Tiberius Pollienus Armenius Peregrinus (fl. 3rd century AD) was a Roman senator who was appointed consul in AD 244.

== Biography ==
Pollienus Armenius Peregrinus was probably the biological son of Lucius Armenius Peregrinus, who was appointed Praetor in AD 213. At some point he was adopted either by Pollienus Auspex or his son Tiberius Julius Pollienus Auspex. (Note: Much depends on the dating of the career of the elder Pollienus Auspex, and his relationship with Julius Pollienus Auspex. See Mennen’s Power and Status in the Roman Empire, AD 193-284 (2011), pgs. 116-118)

In AD 243, Armenius Peregrinus was the Proconsular governor of Lycia et Pamphylia. In the following year (244), he was appointed consul prior alongside Fulvius Aemilianus. It is speculated that at some point he may have been the proconsular governor of Asia.

Armenius Peregrinus was married to the daughter of Flavius Julius Latronianus, the Praefectus urbi under Gordian III.

== Sources ==
- Mennen, Inge, Power and Status in the Roman Empire, AD 193-284 (2011)

Political offices
Preceded by Lucius Annius Arrianus; Gaius Cervonius Papus	Consul of the Roman Empire; 244 with Fulvius Aemilianus	Succeeded by Marcus Julius Philippus Augustus; Gaius Maesius Titianus
