= Legio I Italica =

Roman legion

Map of the Roman Empire in AD 125, under emperor Hadrian, showing the Legio I Italica, stationed on the river Danube at Novae (near Svishtov, Bulgaria), in Moesia Inferior province, from AD 70 until the 5th century

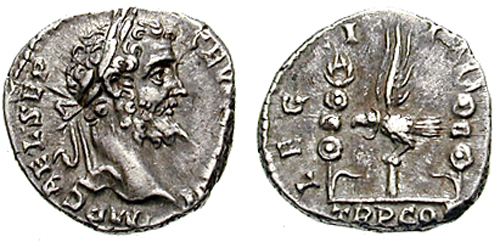
Denarius issued in 193 by Septimius Severus, to celebrate I Italica, which supported the commander of the Pannonian legions in his fight for the purple.

Legio I Italica ("First Italian Legion") was a legion of the Imperial Roman army founded by emperor Nero on September 22, 66 (the date is attested by an inscription). Labeled Phalanx Alexandri Magni and originally destined to the east, it was instead employed in Italy during the year of four emperors. It was later stationed at Novae, near modern-day Svishtov (Bulgaria). There are still records of the I Italica on the Danube border at the beginning of the 5th century. The emblem of the legion was a boar.

== History ==
In the aftermath of the Roman–Parthian War of 58–63, Emperor Nero levied the I Italica with the name phalanx Alexandri Magni ("phalanx of Alexander the Great"), for a campaign in Armenia, ad portas Caspias – to the pass of Chawar. The sources mention the peculiar fact that the original legionaries were all over six feet tall. However, since the Jewish Revolt broke out a few weeks later, the projected Armenian campaign never took place. Also, the governor of Gaul, Gaius Julius Vindex, rose in revolt in early 68 and I Italica was redirected there, arriving just in time to see the end of the revolt. In the Year of the Four Emperors (69), after the death of Nero, the legion received the name I Italica and fought for Vitellius at the second Battle of Bedriacum, where the Vitellians were defeated by forces supporting Vespasian. The new emperor sent I Italica to the province of Moesia in 70 where they encamped at Novae (modern Svishtov) which became the legion's base of operations for centuries.

The legion served on campaign during the Dacian wars of Trajan. The legion was also responsible for bridge construction over the Danube. Building activities seem to have been an area of expertise for the legion. On 3 December 1969 a Roman votive altar was found at Old Kilpatrick on the Antonine Wall dating from around 140 A.D. It has been scanned and a video produced. The inscription mentions the First Cohort of Baetasians, previously known to have been at Bar Hill, and also Julius Candidus, a centurion from I Italica.

During the reign of Marcus Aurelius, Legio I Italica was involved in the wars against the Germanic tribes that threatened to cross the Danube. After a long war, the Romans had conquered much territory on the left side of the Danube. There Marcus Aurelius had intended to form a new province under governor Aulus Julius Pompilius Piso, commander of I Italica and IV Flavia Felix, but the revolt of Avidius Cassius in the East prevented this.

In 193, the Governor of Pannonia Superior, Septimius Severus claimed the purple and moved to Italia. I Italica supported Severus, but did not move to Italy. The legion fought against Severus' rival, Pescennius Niger, besieging Byzantium together with XI Claudia, fighting at Issus. The First possibly took part in the Parthian campaign of Severus (198).

In the 3rd century, during the rule of Caracalla, the legion participated in the construction of the Limes Transalutanus, a defensive wall along the Danube, which began near Novae. Under Alexander Severus, some vexillationes of the I Italica moved to Salonae, guarding the Dalmatian coast.

== Attested members ==
Name	Rank	Time frame	Province	Source
Gaius Manlius Valens	legatus legionis	AD 69		Tacitus, Histories, i.64
Lucius Cossonius Gallus	legatus legionis	before 105	Moesia	CIL III, 6813
Marcus Titius Lustricus Bruttianus	legatus legionis	between 101 and 106	Moesia	
Lucius Novius Crispinus	legatus legionis	c. 140-c. 143	Moesia	CIL VIII, 2747
Lucius Venuleius Apronianus	legatus legionis	c. 143-c. 144	Moesia	CIL IX, 1432
Appius Claudius Martialis	legatus legionis	before 160	Moesia	
Lucius Varius Ambibulus	legatus legionis	c. 160	Moesia	CIL X, 3872
Aulus Julius Pompilius Piso	legatus legionis	c. 175-c. 176	Moesia	
Marcus Magnus Valerianus	legatus legionis	c. 177-180	Moesia	CIL XI, 2106
Marcus Valerius Maximianus	legatus legionis	? 181	Moesia	AE 1956, 124
Publius Septimius Geta	legatus legionis	c. 185	Moesia	AE 1946, 131
Lucius Marius Maximus Perpetuus Aurelianus	legatus legionis	c. 193	Moesia	CIL VI, 1450
Lucius Julius Lucilianus	legatus legionis	between 151 and 200	Moesia	CIL III, 784
Val(erius) O[...]tianus	legatus legionis	15 May 208	Moesia	AE 1982, 849
Quintus Servaeus Fuscus Cornelianus	legatus legionis	5 October 227	Moesia	AE 1972, 526
Font(eius) Maximus	legatus legionis	1 May 233	Moesia	
Gaius Vettius Sabinianus	tribunus angusticlavius	c. 155	Moesia	AE 1920, 45 = ILAfr 281
Lucius Marcius Celer Marcus Calpurnius Longus	tribunus laticlavius	1st quarter 2nd century	Moesia	AE 1972, 620, AE 1972, 621
Quintus Antistius Adventus	tribunus laticlavius	c. 150	Moesia	AE 1972, 620, AE 1893, 88 = ILS 8977

== See also ==
- Capidava
- List of Roman legions
- Novae

J. Hatłas, Legati legionis I Italicae. Zestawienie prozopograficzne, „Balcanica Posnaniensia”, 5, 1990, 191-225.
