= Lucius Marius Perpetuus =

3rd century Roman military officer, senator and consul

Lucius Marius Perpetuus (fl. late 2nd century to early 3rd century AD) was a Roman military officer and senator who was appointed suffect consul sometime between AD 203 and 214.

== Biography ==
Marius Perpetuus was the son of Lucius Marius Perpetuus, an equestrian procurator, and the brother of Marius Maximus, the Roman imperial biographer. Although his career is fairly well documented, many of the dates in which he held office are uncertain.

Possibly a member of the Vigintiviri, his first attested position was as Tribunus laticlavius of the Legio IV Scythica, posted in Syria. Standing as an imperial candidate for the office of quaestor, the next magistracy was either plebeian tribune or aedile; if he was not adlected into the praetorship, it is certain that he was a praetor to hold those offices he is attested as holding.

Marius Perpetuus was commissioned as Legatus legionis of Legio XVI Flavia Firma in Syria-Coele under the governor Lucius Alfenus Senecio, either in AD 200 or around AD 203. This was followed by an appointment as Legatus Augusti pro praetore (or imperial governor) of Arabia Petraea sometime between AD 200 and 207. Sometime around this period, between 203 and 214, Marius Perpetuus was appointed suffect consul, the most likely dates being AD 203, 208 or 214.

Sometime between AD 204 and 211, Marius Perpetuus was the curator rerum publicarum Urbisalviensium (in Piceno) item Tusculanorum, and this was followed by his appointment as Legatus Augusti pro praetore in Moesia Superior, probably from AD 211 to around 214. Then, possibly in 214, or 215/6, he was again Legatus Augusti pro praetore, this time of the province of Tres Daciae. Finally he was appointed the Proconsular governor of either Africa or Asia around AD 218/9.

== Sources ==
- Mennen, Inge, Power and Status in the Roman Empire, AD 193-284 (2011)

Political offices
Preceded by Uncertain	Consul suffectus of the Roman Empire between AD 203 and 214	Succeeded by Uncertain
