= Maecilia gens =

Ancient Roman family

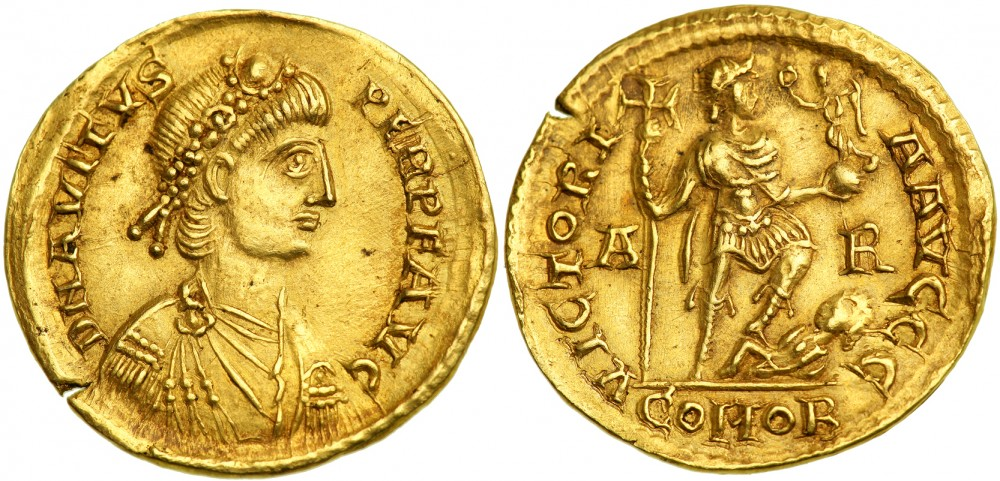
Solidus of Marcus Maecilius Avitus, emperor from AD 455 to 456.

The gens Maecilia or Mecilia was a minor plebeian family at ancient Rome. Although of great antiquity, few members of this gens are mentioned in republican times, including two tribunes of the plebs in the first century of the Republic. The Maecilii appear again, somewhat sporadically, in imperial times, even obtaining the consulship during the early fourth century. One of the last emperors of the Western Empire was Marcus Maecilius Avitus.

== Members ==
- Lucius Maecilius, tribune of the plebs in 470 BC.
- Spurius Maecilius, tribune of the plebs at least four times, the fourth occasion in 416 BC.
- Titus Maecilius Croto, legate in 215 BC, he brought the survivors of the battle of Cannae to Sicily.
- Marcus Maecillius Tullus, triumvir monetalis in 7 BC.
- Lucius Maecilius Scrupus, among the Veientes present at the appointment of a magistrate named Gaius Julius Gelos in AD 26, recorded on an inscription at Veii.
- Marcus Maecilius Rufus, governor of Achaea some time before AD 67.
- Maecilius Fuscus, governor of Britannia Inferior around AD 240. He helped rebuild and expand a fort at what is now Durham.
- Mecilius Hilarianus, consul in AD 332, and praefectus urbi from AD 338 to 339.
- Marcus Maecilius Eparchius Avitus, emperor from AD 455 to 456.
- Maecilius Hi(larianus?), a senator named on a seat in the Colosseum around the time of Odoacer, possibly descended from the consul Hilarianus.

== See also ==
- List of Roman gentes

== Bibliography ==
- Titus Livius (Livy), Ab Urbe Condita (History of Rome).
- Gaius Sollius Apollinaris Sidonius, Panegyrici.
- Hydatius, Chronicon (The Chronicle).
- Georgius Florentius Gregorius (Gregory of Tours), Historiarum (Histories).
- Joseph Hilarius Eckhel, Doctrina Numorum Veterum (The Study of Ancient Coins, 1792–1798).
- Dictionary of Greek and Roman Biography and Mythology, William Smith, ed., Little, Brown and Company, Boston (1849).
- Theodor Mommsen et alii, Corpus Inscriptionum Latinarum (The Body of Latin Inscriptions, abbreviated CIL), Berlin-Brandenburgische Akademie der Wissenschaften (1853–present).
- Edmund Groag, Arthur Stein, Leiva Petersen, and Klaus Wachtel, Prosopographia Imperii Romani (The Prosopography of the Roman Empire, Second Edition, abbreviated PIR^{2}), Berlin (1933–2015).
- T. Robert S. Broughton, The Magistrates of the Roman Republic, American Philological Association (1952).
- David Braund, Augustus to Nero: a Sourcebook on Roman history, 31 BC–AD 68, Routledge, Oxford (1985).
- Anthony R. Birley, The Roman Government of Britain, Oxford University Press (2005).
