= Luscia gens =

Minor plebeian family at ancient Rome

The gens Luscia was a minor plebeian family at ancient Rome. Members of this gens are first mentioned in the early part of the second century BC. They were of senatorial rank, but few of them achieved the higher offices of the Roman state. The only known consul of this gens was Lucius Luscius Ocrea, during the Flavian dynasty.

== Origin ==
The nomen Luscia appears to be formed from the cognomen Luscus, referring to someone with but one eye.

== Branches and cognomina ==
The only cognomen known to have been borne by this family was Ocrea, which appears from Cicero's time to the late first century AD.

== Members ==
- Lavinius Luscius, a comic poet, and a contemporary of Terence.
- Lucius Luscius, a centurion in the years following Sulla's return to Rome. He participated in the Sullan proscriptions of 81 BC, from which he became very wealthy. In 64 BC he was convicted of three murders in connection with his actions during the proscriptions, and condemned.
- Gaius Luscius Ocrea, a senator mentioned by Cicero.
- Lucius Luscius Ocrea, consul suffectus during the reign of Vespasian.

== See also ==
- List of Roman gentes

== Bibliography ==
- Publius Terentius Afer (Terence), Eunuchus, Heauton Timorumenos (The Self-Tormenter), Phormio.
- Marcus Tullius Cicero, Pro Gaio Rabirio Postumo.
- Quintus Asconius Pedianus, Commentarius in Oratio Ciceronis In Toga Candida (Commentary on Cicero's Oration In Toga Candida).
- Plutarchus, Lives of the Noble Greeks and Romans.
- Aulus Gellius, Noctes Atticae (Attic Nights).
- Lucius Cassius Dio (Cassius Dio), Roman History.
- Dictionary of Greek and Roman Biography and Mythology, William Smith, ed., Little, Brown and Company, Boston (1849).
- George Davis Chase, "The Origin of Roman Praenomina", in Harvard Studies in Classical Philology, vol. VIII (1897).
- Paul A. Gallivan, "The Fasti for A. D. 70-96", in Classical Quarterly, vol. 31, pp. 186–220 (1981).
