= Argentoratum =

Ancient name of Strasbourg in France

- Geographic and strategic location of Argentoratum

- Location within France
- 48.5827°N 7.751°E
- Location: France
- Region: Grand Est

Argentoratum or Argentorate was the ancient name of the city of Strasbourg. The name was first mentioned in 12 BC, when it was a Roman military outpost established by Nero Claudius Drusus. From 90 AD the Legio VIII Augusta was permanently stationed there.

== History ==
The Romans under Nero Claudius Drusus established a military outpost belonging to the Germania Superior Roman province close to a Gaulish village near the banks of the Rhine, at the current location of Strasbourg, and named it Argentoratum. Its name was first mentioned in 12 BC but "Argentorate" is the toponym of the Gaulish settlement that preceded it before being Latinised, though it is not known by how long.

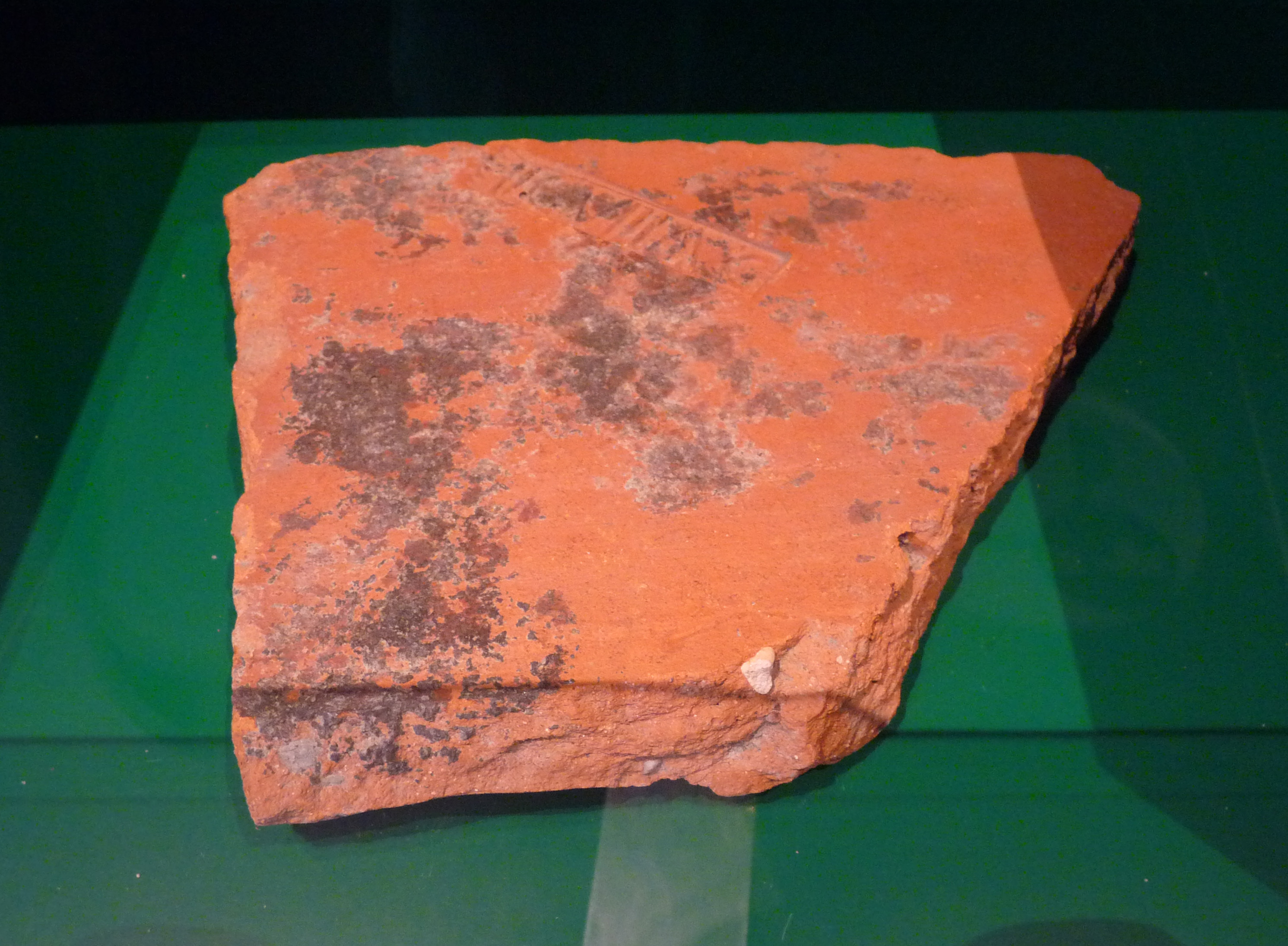
Brick bearing the stamp of the Legio VIII Augusta, found in Rue du Dôme (Musée historique de Strasbourg)

From 90 AD the Legio VIII Augusta permanently stationed in Argentoratum. The Roman camp of Argentoratum then included a cavalry section and covered an area of approximately 20 hectares (49 acres), from approximately 6 hectares (15 acres) in Tiberian times. Other Roman legions temporarily stationed in Argentoratum were the Legio XIV Gemina and the Legio XXI Rapax, the latter during the reign of Nero.

The Alemanni fought a Battle of Argentoratum against Rome in 357 AD. They were defeated by Julian, later Emperor of Rome, and their king Chnodomar was taken prisoner. On 2 January 366 the Alemanni crossed the frozen Rhine in large numbers, to invade the Roman Empire.

From the 4th century, Strasbourg was the seat of the Bishopric of Strasbourg (made an Archbishopric in 1988).

Early in the 5th century the Alemanni appear to have crossed the Rhine, conquered, and then settled what is today Alsace and a large part of Switzerland. From this period on Argentoratum disappears from historical records and is replaced by the toponym "Stratisburgum".

== The site ==
The centre of the camp of Argentoratum proper was situated on the Grande Île, with the cardo being the current Rue du Dôme and the decumanus, the current Rue des Hallebardes.

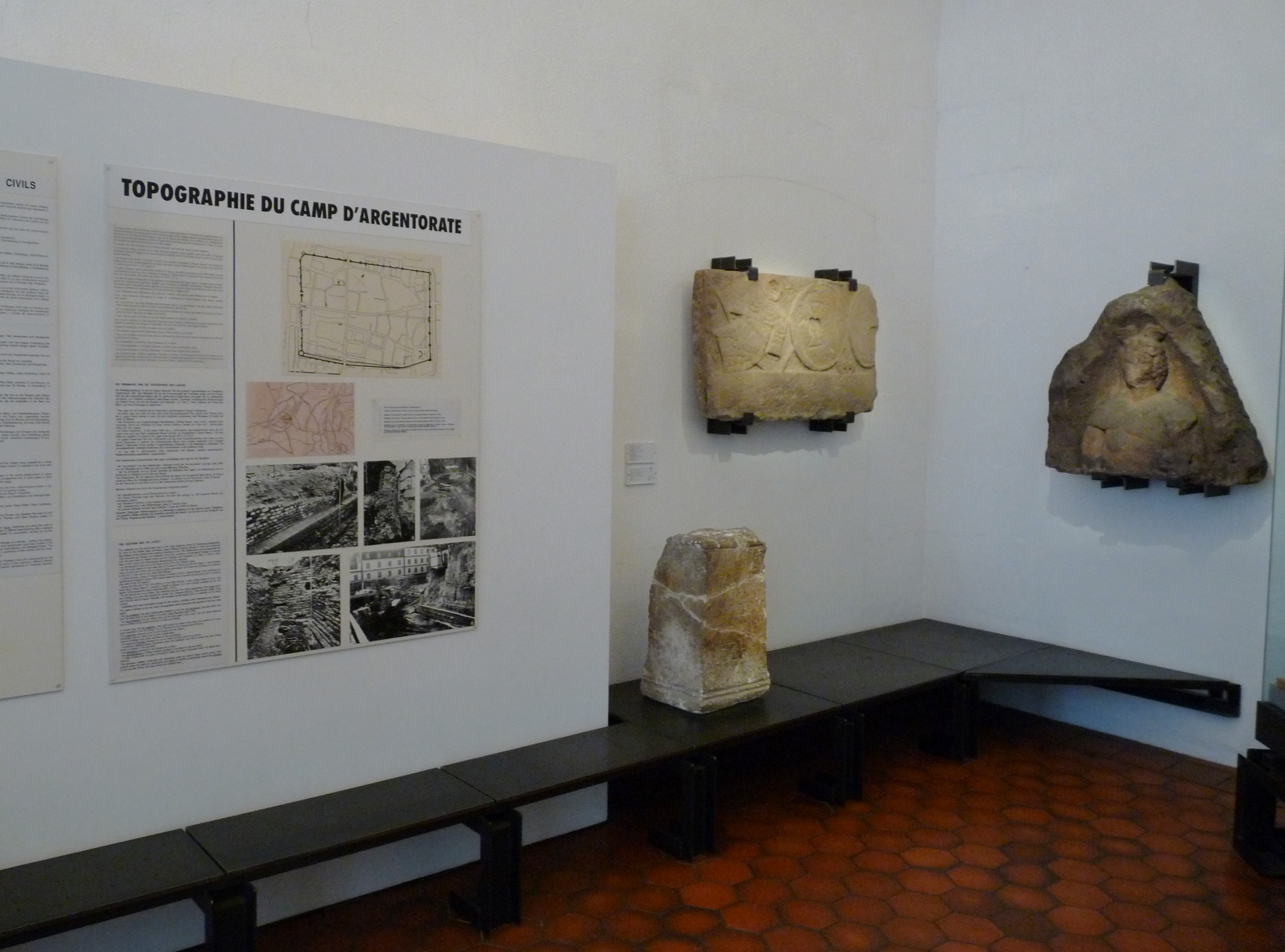
Part of a room dedicated to Argentoratum in the Musée archéologique de Strasbourg

As systematic archaeological studies between 1947 and 1953, conducted by Jean-Jacques Hatt, archaeologist and director of the Musée archéologique de Strasbourg, have shown, Argentoratum was destroyed by fire and rebuilt six times between the first and the 5th century AD: in 70, 97, 235, 355, in the last quarter of the 4th century, and in the early years of the 5th century. It was under Trajan and after the fire of 97 that Argentoratum received its most extended and fortified shape.

Many Roman artifacts have also been found along the road that led to the camp, the current Route des Romains in the suburb of Koenigshoffen, such as the stele of Caius Largennius. This was where the largest burial places (necropoli) were situated, as well as the densest concentration of civilian dwelling places (vici) and commerces next to the camp.

Among the most outstanding finds in Koenigshoffen were the fragments of a grand Mithraeum that had been shattered by early Christians in the 4th century (found in 1911–12 by Robert Forrer, Hatt's predecessor at the head of the Musée archéologique).

Archaeological digs by J.-J. Hatt below the current Saint Stephen's Church in 1948 and 1956 have unearthed the apse of a church dating back to the late 4th century or early 5th century, and considered the oldest church in Alsace. It is supposed that this was the first seat of the Catholic Diocese of Strasbourg.
