= Lucius Luscius Ocrea =

Lucius Luscius Ocrea was Roman senator of the first century. He was suffect consul in either the years 77 or 78. Ocrea is primarily known from inscriptions.

Ocrea was adlected inter patricios by the emperors Vespasian and his son Titus in 73 or 74, doubtlessly as a reward for his support during the Year of the Four Emperors. Although becoming a member of the patrician order would allow the person to skip over a number of steps to accede to the consulship, he is known to have been governor of the public province of Lycia et Pamphylia for an extended term for the years 74/75 through 75/76. After his term as consul, Ocrea was proconsular governor of Asia, considered the acme of a successful senatorial career, in the years 90/91. His life afterwards is not known.

== See also ==
- Luscia (gens)
