= Tetrapharmacum =

Ancient Greek pharmaceutical compound

Tetrapharmacum (Greek: τετραφάρμακος, tetrapharmakos; also τετραϕάρμακον, tetrapharmakon), the "fourfold drug", was an ancient Greek pharmaceutical compound, a mixture of wax, pine resin, pitch and animal fat, most often pork fat.

Tetrapharmacum (or tetrafarmacum) was also the name of a complicated and expensive dish in Roman Imperial cuisine. It contained sow's udder, pheasant, wild boar and ham in pastry. The only surviving source of information about the dish is the Augustan History, which mentions it three times. All three mentions are credited to the now-lost biography of Hadrian by Marius Maximus. According to this source, the Caesar Lucius Aelius (died 138) invented the dish; his senior colleague, the Emperor Hadrian, liked it; a later emperor, Alexander Severus, liked it too.

== Sources ==
- Galen, On the properties of simples (vol. 12 p. 328 Kühn).
- Augustan History Hadrian 21, Aelius 5, Alexander Severus 30.
