= Titus Mussidius Pollianus =

Roman senator

Titus Mussidius Pollianus was a Roman senator active during the Principate. He was the only member of the gens Mussidia to reach the consulate; this office he held as the colleague of Titus Axius in an as yet undetermined year during the earlier part of the reign of emperor Claudius. Pollianus is known from several inscriptions found in Rome.

The portion of the cursus honorum up to his consulate can be reconstructed from a statue base found in Rome, although the offices are listed out of logical order. The earliest office Pollianus would have held was in the decemviri stlitibus judicandis, one of the four boards that formed the vigintiviri; membership in one of these four boards was a preliminary and required first step toward gaining entry into the Roman Senate. Next was as quaestor, and upon completion of this traditional Republican magistracy Pollianus would be enrolled in the Senate. Two more of the traditional Republican magistracies followed: plebeian tribune and praetor.

The three offices Pollianus held after his praetorship are scattered through the inscription on the statue base. Another inscription, now lost, reportedly puts them in the following order: curator viarum (curator of a number of unspecified roads); praefectus frumenti dandi (the prefect responsible for the distribution of Rome's free grain dole); and governor of the public province of Gallia Narbonensis. A. L. F. Rivet dates his governorship of Narbonensis to the years AD 34 to 37. Pollianus' consulate followed.

His life following his consulate is a blank, and his date of death is unknown.
