= Egnatius Lucillianus =

Egnatius Lucillianus (c. 210 – aft. 244) was a Roman senator.

== Life ==
It has been speculated that he was son of Lucius Egnatius Victor Lollianus and the father of Egnatius Lucillus; however, a relationship between the imperial gens Egnatia and Egnatius Lucillianus has been described as very doubtful.

He was the governor or legatus of Britannia Inferior at Eboracum, a province of Britannia, some time between 238 and 244. Little else is known of him although he seems to have been involved in the rebuilding and expansion of the fort at Durham along with his predecessor, Maecilius Fuscus. He also mentioned on a dedication at Bremenium, today High Rochester.
