= Publius Glitius Gallus =

Roman senator and suffect consul

Publius Glitius Gallus was a Roman senator active in the late 1st century AD. He was suffect consul at some yet undetermined nundinium in the first century.

According to Pliny the Elder, a Glitius was the first husband of Vistilia, famous for having seven children by six husbands; she had a son by him, but Pliny does not provide the child's name. Ronald Syme identifies this son (born c. 15 BC) as the father of Glitius Gallus. His tombstone was erected by his wife, Maximila Agnata, at Faleria Nova in Etruria.

== Career ==
A fragmentary inscription from Faleria provides us with details of the earlier portion of his cursus honorum. Gallus began in his teens as one of the tresviri monetalis, the most prestigious of the four boards that form the vigintiviri; assignment to this board was usually allocated to patricians or favored individuals. Soon after he became a salius Palatinus, a member of a priesthood that was reserved to patricians. These two facts led Werner Eck to speculate that Gallus was adlected into the patrician order; however, other experts, such as Hermann Dessau, Syme, and Valerie Maxfield, argue that Gallus was a patrician by birth. As Maxfield points out, if he was a patrician by birth, it would explain the absence of a military tribunate from this inscription.

The inscription continues its list with the mention that Gallus was quaestor in attendance to the emperor at the time; the omission of a name suggests the emperor was one under damnatio memoriae, leading Syme to identify this unnamed emperor with "one of the ephemeral emperors of 69." This was followed by the republican magistracy of praetor, omitting mention of plebeian tribune or aedile; patricians were excused from needing to hold either office in order to advance to the praetorship. After this office he was admitted to the flamines Augustales. Then, for unknown reasons, Gallus received dona militaria in the form of a single hasta pura (or headless spear) from the emperors Vespasian and Titus during their censorship in the years 73–74. "No military posts are recorded in the career of Glitius Gallus so the fact that the decoration was awarded by Vespasian and Titus suggests that it was a reward, not for military service, but for adherence to the Flavian cause in A.D. 69," Maxfield writes. "This would explain why there was only one hasta and none of the coronae and vexilla normally awarded to a senator." The surviving portion ends with mention of his consulship.

The date of his consulship is disputed. One interpretation is based on the fact that the second inscription from Faleria refers to Vespasian without the adjective divus ("divine", attesting to his posthumous promotion to a god) -- which would point to a date before Vespasian's death in the year 79. On the other hand, Syme argues that there are examples of Vespasian being referred to after his death without the word divus; thus its omission does not necessarily mean the inscription was made before Vespasian's death. This allowed Syme to identify Glitius Gallus with an otherwise unknown Gallus who was suffect consul of the year 84.
