= Aulus Egnatius Proculus =

Aulus Egnatius Proculus (fl. 3rd century) was a Roman military officer and senator who was appointed suffect consul either during the late second century or early third century.

== Biography ==
Egnatius Proculus was a member of the gens Egnatia which flourished in the second and third centuries, and it has been speculated that he was the son of Aulus Egnatius Priscillianus, a Roman philosopher. Proculus is known to have filled a number of posts during his career, but no exact or even approximate dates can be assigned to them.

Between the late second century and early third century, he was appointed Legatus Aug Africae dioeces(eos) Numidiae ('governor of the province of Numidia'), and was Legatus legionis of the Legio VIII Augusta stationed in Germania Superior. He was Praefectus frumenti dandi ('prefect responsible for the distribution of Rome's free grain dole'), as well as Praefectus aerarii Saturni ('prefect in charge of the state treasury').

After his appointment as suffect consul, Egnatius Proculus was appointed Curator Bovianensium, Albensium Fucentium, Concordiensium.

Egnatius Proculus was possibly the brother of Quintus Egnatius Proculus and Lucius Egnatius Victor.

== Sources ==
- Mennen, Inge, Power and Status in the Roman Empire, AD 193-284 (2011)

Political offices
Preceded by Uncertain	Consul suffectus of the Roman Empire between AD 175 and 225	Succeeded by Uncertain
