= Pollienus Auspex (consul under Commodus) =

Pollienus Auspex (Note: There has been enormous scholarly discussion over what offices should be assigned to this Pollienus Auspex and which to his father of the same name. This reconstruction is taken from Mennen’s Power and Status in the Roman Empire, AD 193-284 (2011), pgs. 116-118) (fl. 3rd century AD) was a Roman military officer and senator who was appointed suffect consul around AD 185. His praenomen is thought to be Tiberius.

== Biography ==
Pollienus Auspex was a member of the possibly Italian gens Pollieni, and the son of Pollienus Auspex. He reached the office of suffect consul sometime before AD 193, most likely around AD 185. However, from this point on, dates are obscure, and his career has been dated from anywhere from the reign of Commodus to that of Alexander Severus.

His next appointment was probably as Iudex ex delegatione Caesarum or Vice Augg cognoscens (the judicial deputy of the emperor in Rome), which he held either before 192, or between 197 and 202, or around 218–9. Auspex also held a number of provincial commands around this time: Legatus Augusti pro praetore of Hispania Tarraconensis (between 186 and 189, or 193–197, or 222–235), Dacia (between 190 and 192, or 193–197, or 222–235), Moesia Inferior (between 193 and 197, or 222–235) and Britannia (if held between 193 and 197) or Britannia Superior (if held around AD 230).

Although traditionally described as being Pollienus Auspex's biological son, Tiberius Julius Pollienus Auspex has also been identified by some scholars as being the same individual as this Pollienus Auspex. If his career was dated to the reign of Alexander Severus, then Pollienus Auspex was also probably the adoptive father of Tiberius Pollienus Armenius Peregrinus.

== Sources ==
- Mennen, Inge, Power and Status in the Roman Empire, AD 193-284 (2011)

Political offices
Preceded by Uncertain	Consul suffectus of the Roman Empire around AD 185	Succeeded by Uncertain
