= Quintus Egnatius Gallienus Perpetuus =

Roman politician

Quintus Egnatius Gallienus Perpetuus (c. 210 - after 250) was a Roman politician.

He was the son of Quintus Egnatius Proculus and wife Maria Aureliana Violentilla.

He was consularis vir in Allifae, Samnium, Italy.
