= Tiberius Julius Pollienus Auspex =

Tiberius Julius Pollienus Auspex (fl. 3rd century AD) was a Roman senator who was appointed suffect consul between AD 212 and 222.

== Biography ==
Julius Pollienus Auspex, a member of the possibly Italian gens Polliena, was probably the son of Pollienus Auspex, although some scholars have maintained that both men are the same individual. Some time between AD 212 and 222, Auspex was appointed the Legatus Augusti pro praetore of the province of Numidia. He was also during this period appointed suffect consul in absentia.

Julius Pollienus Auspex may have been the adoptive father of Tiberius Pollienus Armenius Peregrinus, consul in AD 244.

== Sources ==
- Mennen, Inge, Power and Status in the Roman Empire, AD 193-284 (2011)

Political offices
Preceded by Uncertain	Consul suffectus in absentia of the Roman Empire between AD 212 and 222	Succeeded by Uncertain
