= Quintus Egnatius Proculus (suffect consul 219) =

3rd century Roman senator and suffect consul

Quintus Egnatius Proculus (fl. 3rd century) was a Roman senator.

== Biography ==
Egnatius Proculus was a member of the second and third century gens Egnatia, and it has been speculated that he was the son of Aulus Egnatius Priscillianus, a Roman philosopher. It is certain that he was appointed suffect consul sometime in a nundinium in the late second or early third century; however, it has been speculated that he was appointed suffect consul in a nundinium around 219.

Some unknown time after his appointment as suffect consul, it is postulated that he was the same Egnatius Proculus who was appointed legatus Augusti consularis ad corrigendum statum liberarum civitatium provinciae Achaiae (or imperial legate responsible for correcting the state of affairs in the province of Achaea).

Egnatius Proculus was possibly the brother of Aulus Egnatius Proculus and Lucius Egnatius Victor. It is possible that he married a daughter of Lucius Marius Perpetuus. It is speculated that he was the father of Quintus Egnatius Proculus.

== Sources ==
- Mennen, Inge, Power and Status in the Roman Empire, AD 193-284 (2011)

Political offices
Preceded by Uncertain	Consul suffectus of the Roman Empire circa AD 219	Succeeded by Uncertain
