= Marcus Egnatius Marcellinus =

Second-century Roman senator and consul

Marcus Egnatius Marcellinus was a senator of Imperial Rome.

== Life ==
He was consul suffectus in the nundinium of April to June 116 as the colleague of Tiberius Julius Secundus.

Marcellinus is the earliest member of the Egnatii to have achieved the rank of consul. This gens was of Samnite origin, and their ancestral city was Teanum. His relatives are thought to include Marcus Egnatius Postumus and Aulus Egnatius Priscillianus.

Political offices
Preceded by Lucius Fundanius Lamia Aelianus, and Sextus Carminius Vetus as ordinary consuls	Consul of the Roman Empire; AD 116 with Tiberius Julius Secundus	Succeeded by Decimus Terentius Gentianus, and L. Co[...] as suffect consuls
