= Aulus Egnatius Priscillianus =

2nd century Roman philosopher

Aulus Egnatius Priscillianus (c. 135 - 1??) was a Roman philosopher.

== Family ==
He married and had Lucius Egnatius Victor, Quintus Egnatius Proculus, and possibly, speculatively, also Aulus Egnatius Proculus, as sons.

He is also thought to be related to Marcus Egnatius Marcellinus and Marcus Egnatius Postumus.
