= Pollienus Auspex (consul under Marcus Aurelius) =

Pollienus Auspex (Note: There has been enormous scholarly discussion over what offices should be assigned to this Pollienus Auspex and which to his son of the same name. This reconstruction is taken from Mennen’s Power and Status in the Roman Empire, AD 193-284 (2011), pp. 116-118) (fl. late 2nd century and early 3rd century AD) was a Roman military officer and senator who was appointed suffect consul sometime between AD 170 and 174. His praenomen is thought to be Tiberius.

== Biography ==
Pollienus Auspex was a member of the possibly Italian gens Pollieni. Reaching the office of suffect consul sometime between AD 170 and 174, he was appointed Legatus Augusti pro praetore or governor of Dalmatia between 173 and 175. He was next made Iudex ex delegatione Caesarum (or the judicial deputy of the emperor in Rome) between 176 and 180, when Marcus Aurelius and Commodus were on the Danube fighting the second of the Marcomannic Wars.

Auspex's next appointment was around AD 180 as praefectus alimentorum (viarum) Appiae et Flaminiae (or officer responsible for ensuring the grain supply and the upkeep of the Appian Way and the Via Flaminia). It was a position he held on three separate occasions. Then sometime between 180 and 200, Auspex was the Proconsular governor of Africa Proconsularis. It has also been suggested that he may have been a legatus Augusti pro praetore of Moesia Inferior between 193 and 197. In 204 Auspex was a member of the Quindecimviri sacris faciundis.

Pollienus Auspex was a man who wielded enormous influence in the imperial court. In around AD 206 he successfully interceded before the emperor on behalf of his nephew Pollienus Sebennus who was accused of acting improperly while governor of Noricum, and even mocked the incoming emperor Septimius Severus when Severus announced his self-adoption into the imperial family of Marcus Aurelius.

Auspex was the father of Pollienus Auspex, who was suffect consul around AD 185.

== Sources ==
- Mennen, Inge, Power and Status in the Roman Empire, AD 193-284 (2011)

Political offices
Preceded by Uncertain	Consul suffectus of the Roman Empire between AD 170 and 174	Succeeded by Uncertain
