= Lucius Egnatius Victor Lollianus =

Lucius Egnatius Victor Lollianus (fl. 3rd century) was a Roman military officer and senator, who served as governor of a number of provinces of the Roman East, including Galatia, Achaea, Bithynia and Pontus, Pannonia Inferior, and Asia. He has been called "the best documented governor of the province of Asia in the Imperial period" on account of the large number of surviving monuments erected in his honour.

== Biography ==
Egnatius Victor was a member of the third century gens Egnatia, and it has been speculated by his praenomen, nomen and first cognomen that he was the son of Lucius Egnatius Victor. In 213 he was coopted to serve with the sodales Antoniniani. He was then appointed legatus Augusti pro praetore of Galatia in 218, before being appointed suffect consul in a nundinium sometime between 225 and 230.

Around 230, Egnatius Victor was appointed corrector of the province of Achaea. This was followed by his posting as legatus Augusti pro praetore of Bithynia et Pontus sometime between 230 and 235. It has been speculated that he was also legatus Augusti pro praetore of Pannonia Inferior sometime during the reign of Alexander Severus (222 – 235).

Egnatius Victor and his brother-in-law Valerian were probably important senatorial supporters of the Gordiani, and he reached the pinnacle of his career during the reign of Gordian III when, between 242 and 244 he became the Proconsular governor of Asia, which he held for three years. He was possibly assigned to the province extra sortem (or outside the usual assignment of senatorial provinces by lot) by Gordian III in relation to his planned campaign against the Sassanid Empire. Egnatius Victor was retained as governor by Philip the Arab after the death of Gordian III, indicating he gave immediate support to Philip after he returned from the Persian campaign. Finally, in 254, he was appointed Praefectus urbi of Rome by his brother-in-law Valerian who had become emperor the year before.

Egnatius Victor was probably the brother of Egnatia Mariniana, who was the wife of Valerian and mother of Gallienus. It has been conjectured that he had a son named Egnatius Lucillianus; however, a relationship between the imperial gens Egnatia and Egnatius Lucillianus has been described as very doubtful. But in the case of his given great-grandchildren Quintus Flavius Maesius Egnatius Lollianus Mavortius and Egnatia Lolliana, his and her nomina Egnatius / Egnatia and their cognomina Lollianus / Lolliana point to a direct descent connection from him.

== Sources ==
- Herrmann, P.; Malay, H. (2003). "Statue bases of the mid third century A.D. from Smyrna". Epigraphica Anatolica. Zeitschrift für Epigraphik und historische Geographie Anatoliens, 36.2003: 1–10.
- Martindale, J. R.; Jones, A. H. M, The Prosopography of the Later Roman Empire, Vol. I 260–395 AD, Cambridge University Press (1971)
- Mennen, Inge, Power and Status in the Roman Empire, 193–284 AD (2011)
- Sourlas, Dimitrios (2019). "Lucius Egnatius Victor Lollianus: A New Honorific Inscription from Athens". In Norena, Carlos F.; Papazarkadas, Nikolaos (eds.). From document to history : epigraphic insights into the Greco-Roman world. Leiden. pp. 393–407. ISBN 9789004382879.
- Strasser, Jean-Yves (2024). "L. Egnatius Victor Lollianus, de Sardes à Athènes et Nicomédie". In: Antiquité classique 93, pp. 225–259.

Political offices
Preceded by Uncertain	Consul suffectus of the Roman Empire between AD 225 and 230	Succeeded by Uncertain
