= Julius Proculus =

Julius Proculus (Greek: Ίούλιος Πρόκουλος) was a Roman senator from Asia Minor, likely descended from Roman settlers. He was suffect consul around the year 156. Géza Alföldy suggests he may be the father of Aulus Julius Pompilius Piso, suffect consul in 178 or 179; Bernard Rémy amplifies this hypothesis, identifying Proculus' wife as Claudia Basilo, from Synnada.

Rémy suggests Proculus may be the Julius Proculus massacred with his family by the emperor Commodus between 190 and 192.

Proculus is known from two inscriptions. One is the inscription of Opramoas, which attests Proculus was governor of Lycia et Pamphylia in September 152; assuming he was the successor of Decimus Rupilius Severus, his tenure has been estimated to extend from 151 to 153. The other is an inscription recovered from Ephesus that, although damaged, Alföldy has restored to attest Proculus had been a suffect consul.
