= Helvidia gens =

Plebeian family of ancient Rome

The gens Helvidia was a plebeian family at Rome. Members of this gens are first mentioned in the final decades of the Republic. A century later, the Helvidii distinguished themselves by what has been called their "earnest, but fruitless, patriotism."

== Origin ==
Cicero mentions Publius Helvidius Rufus in connection with Larinum, a town of the Frentani. From this it seems probable that the Helvidii were of Sabellic origin.

== Branches and cognomina ==
The Helvidii used the surnames Priscus and Rufus. The only member of the family found without a surname was the Helvidius who was put to death during the reign of Domitian; but as he was the son of Helvidius Priscus, it may simply be that his surname has not been preserved in the manuscripts in which he appears.

== Members ==
- Publius Helvidius Rufus, a native of Larinum, mentioned by Cicero.
- Helvidius Priscus, a legate serving under Gaius Ummidius Quadratus, the governor of Syria. He was sent across the Taurus Mountains in AD 52, to help settle the province of Cappadocia.
- Helvidius Priscus, a statesman from the reigns of Nero to Vespasian. His father was a centurion named Cluvius, but he was adopted into the Helvidian gens. Priscus was tribune of the plebs in AD 56, and praetor in 70. His republican sentiments and defiance toward the emperors brought about his banishment on two occasions, and ultimately resulted in his execution under Vespasian.
- Helvidius (Priscus), son of the praetor, held the consulship in an uncertain year. Schooled by his father's fate, he carefully avoided open opposition to the emperors, but in the reign of Domitian, the delatores accused him of satirizing one of the emperor's divorces; he was condemned in the Senate and dragged to prison, followed shortly by his execution. His death was avenged by Pliny the Younger, who impeached the leader of the delatores.
- Helvidius (Priscus), son of the consular, survived his father.
- Helvidia, elder daughter of the consular, died in infancy.
- Helvidia, younger daughter of the consular, died in infancy.
- Helvidius (or possibly Helvetius), the author of an early Christian treatise arguing against the perpetual virginity of Mary, based on the "brothers and sisters" of Jesus mentioned in the Bible. St. Jerome wrote a treatise in opposition to Helvidius' argument.

== See also ==
- List of Roman gentes

== Bibliography ==
- Marcus Tullius Cicero, Pro Cluentio.
- Gaius Plinius Secundus (Pliny the Elder), Naturalis Historia (Natural History).
- Gaius Plinius Caecilius Secundus (Pliny the Younger), Epistulae (Letters).
- Publius Cornelius Tacitus, De vita et moribus Iulii Agricolae (On the Life and Mores of Julius Agricola).
- Publius Cornelius Tacitus, Historiae.
- Publius Cornelius Tacitus, Annales.
- Publius Cornelius Tacitus, Dialogus de Oratoribus
- Epictetus, Diatribae (Discourses).
- Plutarchus, Lives of the Noble Greeks and Romans.
- Gaius Suetonius Tranquillus, De Vita Caesarum (Lives of the Caesars, or The Twelve Caesars).
- Decimus Junius Juvenalis, Satires
- Lucius Cassius Dio Cocceianus (Cassius Dio), Roman History.
- Dictionary of Greek and Roman Biography and Mythology, William Smith, ed., Little, Brown and Company, Boston (1849).
