= Lucius Varius Ambibulus =

Roman senator

Lucius Varius Ambibulus (full name: Quintus Planius Sardus Lucius Varius Ambibulus), was a Roman senator of the 2nd century AD who occupied a number of offices in the imperial service, as well as serving as suffect consul in either 132 or 133.

His cognomen "Ambibulus" was described by Ronald Syme as "peculiar and uncommon"; he could only count five examples of its use in inscriptions found at Rome, and one more in North Africa. Based on the evidence that his father's name was also L. Varius Ambibulus, his sister's name is Varia, and his freedmen were Varii, Olli Salomies argues his original name was Lucius Varius Ambibulus, and the terms of a testamentary adoption one Quintus Planius Sardus directed Ambibulus to add his name to Ambibulus' in return for a share of the latter's estate. However, Werner Eck and Margaret Roxan present another possibility, based on a military diploma owned by Martin Schøyen, that mentions an equestrian "Q. Planius Sardus", the commander of ala I Ulpia contrariorum milliaria. Noting the nomen gentile "is otherwise rare in the senatorial and equestrian classes", they argue that Ambibulus is related to this equestrian, adding the "Quintus Planius Sardus" element in his name from his mother's side.

== Career ==
The career of Ambibulus up to his consulate can be reconstructed from a damaged inscription erected in Cuicul in Numidia; it was erected by order of the civic government to honor him as their patron. In this inscription, all of his posts are listed in chronological order, except oddly for the first in the list, a hitch as military tribune in a legion whose name is mostly missing. In the order Ambibulus held these offices, he began his career in his teenage years as one of the decemviri stlitibus iudicandis, which was one of the four boards comprising the vigintiviri. The traditional Republican magistracies followed: quaestor, plebeian tribune, and praetor.

After stepping down as praetor, Ambibulus served as praefectus frumentus dandi ex senatus, then was selected by the sortition to be proconsular governor of Macedonia in 124/125. This was followed by two commissions as legatus legionis or commander of legions: Legio I Italica in Moesia, and Legio III Augusta in Numidia; we know from other sources he commanded a Legio III in 132. Subsequently, Ambibulus was suffect consul; his career after his consulship is unknown.
