= Sextus Sentius Caecilianus =

Sextus Sentius Caecilianus was a Roman senator, who was active during the first century AD. He was suffect consul in an undetermined nundinium during the reign of Vespasian. He is known entirely from inscriptions.

From his filiation, we know his father's praenomen was Sextus, making it is unlikely Caecilianus was a descendant of Gaius Sentius Saturninus, consul in BC 19: none of Saturninus' three sons bore that praenomen.

The cursus honorum of Caecilianus can be mostly reconstructed from a damaged inscription found in Amiternum (modern San Vittorino), erected by his wife (whose name is lost) and his freedman Atlans. The earliest office he is known to have held was in the decemviri stlitibus judicandis, one of the four boards that formed the vigintiviri; membership in one of these four boards was a preliminary and required first step toward gaining entry into the Roman Senate. Next he was commissioned a military tribune with Legio VIII Augusta, at the time stationed in Pannonia. Upon returning to Rome, Caecilianus was appointed quaestor, and served in the Senatorial province of Baetica; upon completion of this traditional Republican magistracy he would be enrolled in the Senate. The next two traditional Republican magistracies followed: plebeian aedile and praetor.

Upon concluding the office of praetor, Caecilianus could then hold a number of significant offices. The first was curator alvei Tiberis et riparum, or overseer of civil works concerning the Tiber river. Next the sortition allocated him a Senatorial province to govern, but the portion of the inscription with the name is missing. Following this Caecilianus was commissioned legatus legionis of two legions: Legio XV Apollinaris stationed in Cappadocia and Legio III Augusta, stationed in Numidia. J.E.L. Spaul dates his work with Gaius Rutilius Gallicus, then proconsular of Africa demarcating the boundary between "Old Africa" and "New Africa" to the period he commanded the III Augusta; this would have dated the work at some point between June 73 and May 74. This was followed by his appointment over the combined provinces of Mauretania Caesariensis and Mauretania Tingitana; Spaul dates this to AD 75. His consulship was not long afterwards.

It is very likely that Sentius Caecilianus died not long after his consulship.
