= Le Pègue =

- Commune
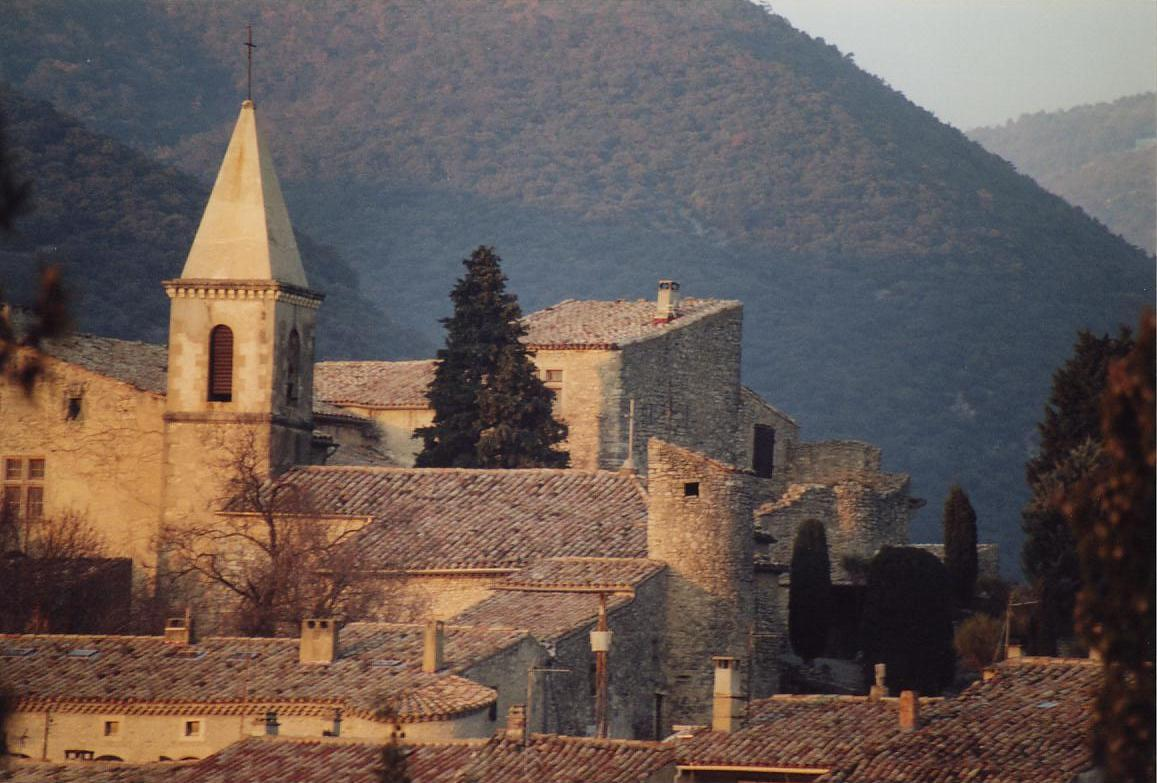
- A view of the old village of Le Pègue
- Location of Le Pègue
- Location within France Location within Auvergne-Rhône-Alpes
- Coordinates: 44°25′49″N 5°03′02″E
- Country: France
- Region: Auvergne-Rhône-Alpes
- Department: Drôme
- Arrondissement: Nyons
- Canton: Grignan

Government
  - Mayor (2020–2026): Guy Vial
- Area^{1}: 11.12 km^{2} (4.29 sq mi)
- Highest elevation: 1,323 m (4,341 ft)
- Lowest elevation: 348 m (1,142 ft)
- Population (2023): 358
  - Density: 32.2/km^{2} (83.4/sq mi)
- Time zone: UTC+01:00 (CET)
  - Summer (DST): UTC+02:00 (CEST)
- INSEE/Postal code: 26226 /26770
- ^{1} French Land Register data, which excludes lakes, ponds, glaciers > 1 km^{2} (0.386 sq mi or 247 acres) and river estuaries.

Le Pègue (French pronunciation: [lə pɛɡ]; Occitan: Lo Pègue) is a commune in the Drôme department in southeastern France.

With a history spanning 6,000 years, Le Pègue showcases in its archaeological museum the discoveries made within its territory. As a significant Iron Age site, it bears witness to the early interactions between the Celts and Greeks.

== Population ==
Historical population
Year	Pop.	±% p.a.
1968	198	—
1975	214	+1.12%
1982	305	+5.19%
1990	369	+2.41%
1999	373	+0.12%
2007	381	+0.27%
2012	387	+0.31%
2017	364	−1.22%
2023	358	−0.28%
Source: INSEE

== See also ==
- Communes of the Drôme department
