= Publius Egnatius Celer =

1st century AD Roman philosopher and informer

Publius Egnatius Celer (lived c. AD 60), was a Stoic philosopher, who as a result of being a delator, or informer, in the reign of Nero, was sentenced to death in the reign of Vespasian.

Treason charges were brought against Barea Soranus in AD 66 because he had incurred the hatred of Nero. Egnatius Celer, who had formerly been a client and the teacher of Barea Soranus, stood as chief witness against him. Barea Soranus was condemned to death together with his daughter Servilia.

Egnatius received great rewards from Nero, but was afterwards accused by Musonius Rufus, another Stoic philosopher, under Vespasian, and fell out from favor.
