= Robert Forrer =

Swiss-born archaeologist and antique dealer (1866–1947)

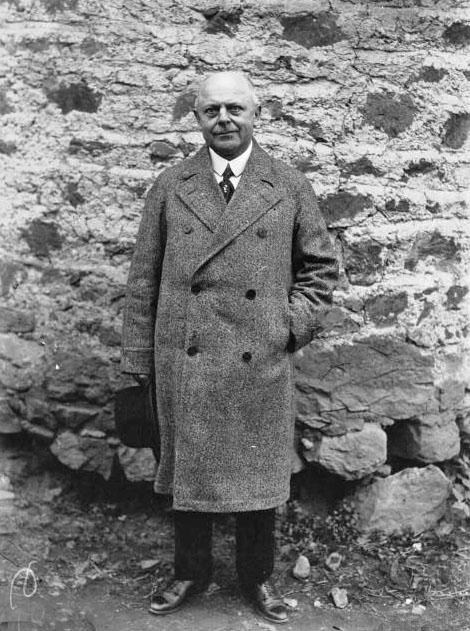
- Robert Forrer in 1927
- Born: 9 January 1866; Meilen, Switzerland
- Died: 9 April 1947 (aged 81); Strasbourg, France
- Occupations: Archaeologist, antique dealer
- Known for: Archaeology of Roman Alsace, Coptic textiles, Celtic coinage

Robert Forrer (9 January 1866 – 9 April 1947) (Note: Faral's eulogy gives the date of birth as 6 January 1866. Modern reference works, including the Historical Dictionary of Switzerland, give 9 January.) was a Swiss-born archaeologist, antique dealer and writer who settled in Strasbourg and became one of the leading figures in the archaeology of Alsace. Though he held no university post, he was placed in charge of the city's prehistoric and Gallo-Roman museum, which he directed for many years, and he published widely on the prehistory and Gallo-Roman past of Alsace, on Coptic textiles, and on medieval art.

== Early life ==
Forrer was born on 9 January 1866 at Meilen, near Zürich, into a Protestant family of merchants that held citizenship of Winterthur. His father, also named Robert, was a merchant and silk manufacturer. He took a serious interest in the past from an early age, and while still at school he was noticed and taught by the Swiss archaeologist Ferdinand Keller, a pioneer of research into the prehistoric lake dwellings. At the age of sixteen, in 1882, he launched the archaeological journal Antiqua, which he produced with Heinrich Messikommer and ran for about a decade, until 1891.

In 1887, at the age of twenty-one, Forrer left Switzerland and settled permanently in Strasbourg, drawn by the opportunities the city offered for study. There he worked as an antique dealer, collector and archaeologist. He married twice, first in 1887 to Emilie Albertine Hager and then in 1925 to Philippine Loew.

== Career ==
Forrer held no German university qualifications, but after taking a doctorate at Bern in 1898 he was placed in charge of the prehistoric and Gallo-Roman museum of Strasbourg, housed in the Château de Rohan. According to Faral, the German authorities entrusted the museum to him in 1905 and the French administration confirmed him in the post in 1918, while the Historical Dictionary of Switzerland dates his curatorship from 1909. He directed numerous scientific excavations across Alsace and held the post for the rest of his working life. In 1937 he was made a chevalier of the Legion of Honour, and in 1944 he was elected a corresponding member of the Académie des Inscriptions et Belles-Lettres. During the Second World War he withdrew to Zürich.

== Work ==
Forrer's first major undertaking followed a journey to Egypt in 1891, when he directed excavations in the Coptic cemetery of Akhmim, the ancient Panopolis. From it he published a volume of travel notes and several studies, on the date and technique of Coptic textiles, on the silk industry of the Roman and Byzantine periods, and on the early Christian antiquities of Panopolis.

On his return, Forrer devoted himself to the history of Alsace from its earliest origins to the Middle Ages. He was among the first to study the region's Palaeolithic and later prehistoric finds, publishing on reindeer remains from a cave in 1891, on the Quaternary fauna and human presence in Alsace in 1915, and on a mammoth-hunters' hearth at Achenheim in 1930. He set his local findings in a wider frame in two reference works, a Reallexikon of prehistoric, classical and early Christian antiquities (1907) and Urgeschichte der Europäer (1908).

For the Gallo-Roman period, Forrer's many excavations and finds, ranging over Celtic coins, fortified enclosures, local pottery and the wall paintings of Mithraic sanctuaries, underpinned two major works: Strasbourg-Argentorate, published in two volumes in 1926, and L'Alsace romaine (1935). His learning also extended to medieval art, including pewterwork, manuscript illumination, Romanesque frescoes, Gothic sculpture and the drawings of Martin Schongauer.

== Selected publications ==
- Forrer, Robert (1895). Mein Besuch in El-Achmim (in German). Strasbourg.
- Forrer, Robert (1907). Reallexikon der prähistorischen, klassischen und frühchristlichen Altertümer (in German). Berlin.
- Forrer, Robert (1908). Keltische Numismatik der Rhein- und Donaulande (in German). Strasbourg.
- Forrer, Robert (1911). Die römischen Terra-sigillata-Töpfereien von Heiligenberg-Dinsheim und Ittenweiler im Elsass (in German). Stuttgart: W. Kohlhammer.
- Forrer, Robert (1926–1927). Strasbourg-Argentorate préhistorique, gallo-romain et mérovingien. Strasbourg: Istra.
- Forrer, Robert (1935). L'Alsace romaine. Paris: Ernest Leroux.
