= Pollia gens =

Ancient Roman family

The gens Pollia (Pōllia) was a minor plebeian family at ancient Rome. The gens must have been very old, as one of the original Servian tribes was named after it, suggesting that the Pollii were important landowners during the Roman monarchy. However, few Pollii are mentioned in history, and none of them attained any of the higher offices of the Roman state. A number of Pollii are known from inscriptions.

== Origin ==
The nomen Pollius seems to be a patronymic surname derived from the old praenomen Paullus, "little", which was little used in historical times, except in its feminine form, Paulla, (Note: Also spelled Polla and Pola.) or as a cognomen, particularly by the great patrician house of the Aemilii. An alternative derivation would be from the surname Pollio, originally referring to one who polished arms. Chase classifies Pollius among those gentilicia which either originated at Rome, or are not known to have come from anywhere else.

== Praenomina ==
The Pollii used a variety of praenomina, especially Publius, Gaius, Marcus, Gnaeus, and Lucius, all of which were very common throughout Roman history. Other names appear occasionally, including Quintus and Numerius, of which the latter was widespread, but uncommon.

== Members ==
This list includes abbreviated praenomina. For an explanation of this practice, see filiation.

- Pollia, named in a funerary inscription found at Pombal, formerly part of Lusitania.
- Pollius, buried at Turris Libisonis in Sardinia, aged seven years, three months, and five days.
- Gaius Pollius, named in a funerary inscription found at Pombal.
- Gnaeus Pollius, named in an inscription found in the church of Santa Maria in Casalpiano, in Apulia.
- Publius Pollius P. l., a freedman named in an inscription from Baeterrae in Gallia Narbonensis.
- Quintus Pollius Q. l., a freedman named in an inscription from Tarracina in Latium, dating to the late first century BC or early first century AD.
- Gaius Pollius St. l. Acastus, a freedman named in an inscription from Rome.
- Quintus Pollius C. f. Africanus, son of Gaius Pollius Felix and Silvana Prima, named in an inscription from Amiternum in Sabinum.
- Gaius Pollius Albanus, named in a dedicatory inscription from Narona in Dalmatia.
- Lucius Pollius Albanus, named in inscriptions from Rome and Veii.
- Aulus Pollius P. l. Alexander, a freedman named in an inscription from Capua in Campania.
- Publius Pollius Anoptes, named in a funerary inscription from Rome.
- Lucius Pollius L. Ɔ. l. Anteros, named in an inscription from Rome.
- Marcus Pollius Apollonius, named in an inscription from Mediolanum in Gallia Transpadana
- Gnaeus Pollius Besa, named in a funerary inscription at Rome.
- Marcus Pollius Ɔ. l. Eros, a freedman buried at Rome.
- Gaius Pollius Felix, husband of Silvana Prima, and father of Quintus Pollius Africanus and Pollia Politta, named in an inscription from Amiternum.
- Gaius Pollius Felix, dedicated a tomb at Lambaesis in Numidia for his wife, Octavia Clara, aged twenty-five.
- Pollia Ɔ. l. Glucinna, a freedwoman buried at Rome.
- Marcus Pollius Ɔ. l. Hibricio, a freedman buried at Rome.
- Lucius Pollius L. l. Hilario, a freedman named in an inscription from Rome.
- Pollius L. l. Hilarus, a freedman named in an inscription from Cora in Latium.
- Publius Pollius Hilarus, buried at Rome.
- Pollius Hypatus, named in a funerary inscription from Rome, dating to the second century AD, or the latter part of the first.
- Quintus Pollius Ɔ. l. Kandaules, named in an inscription from Tarracina, dating to the later first century BC, or the earlier part of the first century AD.
- Marcus Pollius M. f. Hispanus, a centurion in the fifth legion, buried at Potaissa.
- Marcus Pollius Lic[...], a freedman named in an inscription from Mediolanum.
- Gnaeus Pollius Lucrio, named in a funerary inscription from Rome.
- Pollius Marinus L. l., buried at Altinum in Venetia and Histria.
- Publius Pollius Murranus, freedman of Pancarpus, and husband of Pollia Urbana, buried at Narbo in Gallia Narbonensis.
- Gnaeus Pollius Parthenopaeus, buried at Rome.
- Pollius Paternus, son of Sabinus, named in an inscription from Vicus Dolensis in Gallia Aquitania.
- Publius Pollius Peplus, buried at Narbo.
- Lucius Pollius Philetus, named in a list of soldiers stationed at Rome in AD 70.
- Pollia C. f. Politta, daughter of Gaius Pollius Felix and Silvana Prima, named in an inscription from Amiternum.
- Numerius Pollius Primus Senior, named in a dedicatory inscription from Cumae in Campania, dating to AD 251.
- Numerius Pollius Primus Junior, named in a dedicatory inscription from Cumae.
- Publius Pollius Primus, freedman of Silo, buried at Baeterrae.
- Pollia Privata, buried at Narbo.
- Gnaeus Pollius Protus, named in a funerary inscription from Rome.
- Marcus Pollius Pudens, named in a graffito from Pompeii.
- Lucius Pollius Restitutus, buried at Rome, aged eleven years, two months, and thirty days, in a tomb dating to the second century AD, or the latter part of the first.
- Gaius Pollius Rogatus, buried at Cuicul in Numidia, aged eighty.
- Publius Pollius Romanus, buried at Rome, aged five.
- Pollius Saturninus, buried at Ucubi in Numidia, aged eighty.
- Pollius Savinus, named in a funerary inscription from Turris Libisonis.
- Titus Pollius Severus, named in an inscription from Teurnia in Noricum.
- Lucius Pollius Siccensis, buried at Carthage in Africa Proconsularis, aged seventy.
- Marcus Pollius M. f. Silenus, one of the Seviri Augustales, named in an inscription from Mediolanum.
- Publius Pollius S. f. Speratus, buried at Rome, aged twenty-one.
- Publius Pollius Spinther, named in an inscription from Rome.
- Pollius N. l. Stabilio, a freedman buried at Rome.
- Gaius Pollius Truentino Restitutus Picens, a soldier in the praetorian guard, buried at Rome, aged thirty three, having served thirteen years.
- Pollia Urbana, wife of Publius Pollius Murranus, buried at Narbo.
- Pollius Victor, buried at Thabraca in Africa Proconsularis, aged eight.
- Gnaeus Pollius Cn. l. Victor, a freedman named among the Seviri Augustales at Puteoli in Campania, in AD 56.
- Naevius Pollius Priscus, named in a dedicatory inscription from Cumae.
- Titus Volusinus Pollius, son of Rufimus, named in an inscription from Vicus Haterianus in Africa Proconsularis.
- Publius Pollius Felix, a wealthy Roman from Puteoli who was mentioned in the Silvae by Statius. Pollius Felix is said by Statius to have owned a massive villa in Surrentum, which is now used as the Regina Giovanna bath. Pollius Felix is best known as a character in Caroline Lawrence's novel series The Roman Mysteries. It is said that he had a daughter named Polla who married a man named Julius Menecrates. He also had a wife named Polla.

== See also ==
- List of Roman gentes

== Bibliography ==
- Theodor Mommsen et alii, Corpus Inscriptionum Latinarum (The Body of Latin Inscriptions, abbreviated CIL), Berlin-Brandenburgische Akademie der Wissenschaften (1853–present).
- Notizie degli Scavi di Antichità (News of Excavations from Antiquity, abbreviated NSA), Accademia dei Lincei (1876–present).
- Gustav Wilmanns, Inscriptiones Africae Latinae (Latin Inscriptions from Africa, abbreviated ILAfr), Georg Reimer, Berlin (1881).
- René Cagnat et alii, L'Année épigraphique (The Year in Epigraphy, abbreviated AE), Presses Universitaires de France (1888–present).
- George Davis Chase, "The Origin of Roman Praenomina", in Harvard Studies in Classical Philology, vol. VIII (1897).
- Stéphane Gsell, Inscriptions Latines de L'Algérie (Latin Inscriptions from Algeria, abbreviated ILAlg), Edouard Champion, Paris (1922–present).
