= Quintus Egnatius Proculus =

Roman aristocrat

Quintus Egnatius Proculus (c. 190 – after 210) was a Roman aristocrat.

== Life ==
It is speculated that he was the son of Quintus Egnatius Proculus. He was suffect consul in the nundinium of an unknown year. He is known from an inscription that also mentions his wife Maria Aureliana Violentilla, the daughter of an unknown consular.
