= Adlecti =

During the Roman Kingdom, Roman Republic and later, adlecti, or allecti were those who were chosen to fill up a vacancy in any office or collegium, and especially those who were chosen to fill up the proper number of the senate. As these would be generally equites, Festus defines the adlecti to be equites added to the senate: and he appears in this passage to make a distinction between the adlecti and the conscripti. This distinction is supported by the summons form used to call the senate, which reads pares and conscripti beginning in 509 BC. Others argue that they were the same; for in another passage, Festus gives the same definition of the conscripti as he had done of the adlecti, and Livy (ii.1) says conscriptos in novum senatum appellabant lectos.

The adelecti were also those persons under the empire who were admitted to the privileges and honours of the praetorship, quaestorship, aedileship, and other public offices, without having any duties to perform (Historia Augusta, "Helvius Pertinax", 6). In inscriptions, we constantly find, adlectus inter tribunos, inter quaestores, inter praetores, etc.
