= Bruttia gens =

Ancient Roman family

The gens Bruttia was an ancient Roman family during the late Republic and into imperial times. None of the gens obtained any important magistracies until the latter half of the first century AD, when Lucius Bruttius Maximus was proconsul in Cyprus.

== Origin ==
The nomen Bruttius probably indicates that the ancestors of the gens were from Bruttium, the southernmost region of Italia. The Bruttii were an Oscan people descended from the Lucani, from whom they asserted their independence during the fourth century BC. The name of Bruttii, which they adopted for themselves, may be a pre-Sabellic name meaning "runaways".

== Praenomina ==
The praenomina used by the Bruttii are Lucius, Gaius, and Quintus.

== Branches and cognomina ==
No distinct families of the Bruttii appear under the Republic, during which the only cognomen is Sura. A number of surnames occur in imperial times, of which all but Balbus appear to belong to the same family. The others were Maximus, Praesens, and Crispinus. This family came from Volceii, in Lucania, and seems to have made a habit of adopting names from the female line. The combination of Quinctius or Quintius Crispinus probably asserts the family's descent from the ancient patrician house of the Quinctii Crispini.

== Members ==
This list includes abbreviated praenomina. For an explanation of this practice, see filiation.

- Quintus Bruttius Sura, legate of Gaius Sentius Saturninus, governor of Macedonia in 88 BC.
- Gaius Bruttius C. f., proquaestor in an unspecified year, and aedile in 57 BC.
- Bruttius, an eques, for whom Cicero wrote a letter of introduction to Manius Acilius Caninus, proconsul in Sicilia in 46 BC.
- Bruttius, a philologer, with whom the younger Marcus Tullius Cicero studied at Athens in 44 BC.
- Quintus Bruttius Balbus, a candidate for duumvir at Pompeii, mentioned in a political graffito.
- Lucius Bruttius Maximus, proconsul of Cyprus in AD 80.
- Gaius Bruttius L. f. Praesens Lucius Fulvius Rusticus, consul in AD 139.
- Lucius Fulvius Gaius Bruttius C. f. L. n. Praesens Laberius Maximus, consul in AD 153 and 180.
- Bruttia C. f. C. n. Crispina, Roman empress, the wife of Commodus.
- Lucius Bruttius C. f. C. n. Quinctius Crispinus, consul in AD 187.
- Gaius Bruttius Praesens, consul in AD 217.
- Lucius Bruttius Quintius Crispinus, consul in AD 224, and afterwards persuaded the city of Aquileia to resist Maximinus Thrax.
- Gaius Bruttius Praesens, consul in AD 246.
- Bruttius or "Brittius" Praesens, corrector of Lucania and Bruttium, and a pontifex major, around the early fourth century.

== See also ==
- List of Roman gentes
- Brutus (disambiguation)
