= Quintus Glitius Atilius Agricola =

Late 1st/early 2nd century Roman senator, consul and general

Governor of Gallia Belgica
- In office 94–97
- Monarchs: Domitian; Nerva

Governor of Pannonia
- In office 100–102
- Monarch: Trajan

Personal details
- Born: 53 at latest
- Died: Unknown
- Occupation: Politician; commander; priest
- Religion: Ancient Roman religion

Military service
- Allegiance: Roman Empire
- Branch/service: Roman army
- Rank: Legate
- Commands: Legio VI Ferrata
- Battles/wars: Dacian Wars

Quintus Glitius Atilius Agricola was a Roman senator and general who held several posts in the emperor's service. He was twice suffect consul: for the first time in AD 97 with Lucius Pomponius Sura as his colleague, and the second time in 103 when he replaced the emperor Trajan. He is the last known person to have held two suffect consulates. Agricola is known only through a large number of fragmentary inscriptions from Augusta Taurinorum, which appears to be his home town.

His full name, father's praenomen (Publius) and tribe (Stellatina) are known from these inscriptions. It is often assumed that Agricola was the son or grandson of the equestrian officer Glitius Barbarus, who is attested as living in 48 or 49, but Olli Salomies notes that his father's praenomen is attested as Publius, then argues that it makes better sense to assume that his name at birth was Atilius Agricola and he was afterwards adopted by a Q. Glitius.

== Career ==
Of these inscriptions found in Taurinorum, two provide the details of his cursus honorum up to his first consulship. His first documented service was as sevir equitum Romanorum at the annual review of the equites, which was followed as one of the decemviri stlitibus judicandus, one of the magistracies that comprised the vigintiviri. Agricola then served as military tribune in Legio I Italica. Under the emperor Vespasian he was quaestor, which could have been as late as the year 78. Since Roman senators commonly held the office of quaestor at the age of 25, this suggests Agricola was born in the year 53, at the latest.

Following this he was curule aedile, then praetor, an office commonly held at the age of 30. Both inscriptions include a term as governor of Hispania Citerior, although Werner Eck does not mention this office in his fasti of governors for this period. Then Agricola received a commission as commander, or legatus legionis, of Legio VI Ferrata. During the reign of the emperor Nerva he was governor of the imperial province of Gallia Belgica from 94 to 97; Agricola may have been picked by Nerva for the office. After holding the fasces for the first time he was governor of Pannonia from 100, when he replaced Lucius Julius Ursus Servianus, to the end of 102. Between the end of his service in Pannonia and returning to Rome, Agricola participated in the Dacian Wars, where he earned a set of dona militaria, or military decorations, appropriate to an ex-consul.

Following his second consulship, Agricola was urban prefect of Rome. He was also recorded as a member of at least two priestly collegia, first as one of the septemviri epulonum, then afterwards he was admitted to the sodales Augustales.

Political offices
Preceded by Lucius Domitius Apollinaris, and Sextus Hermentidius Campanus as Suffect consuls	Suffect consul of the Roman Empire; 97 with Lucius Pomponius Maternus	Succeeded by Publius Cornelius Tacitus, and Marcus Ostorius Scapula as Suffect consuls
Preceded by Trajan V, and Manius Laberius Maximus II	Suffect consul of the Roman Empire; 103 with Manius Laberius Maximus II	Succeeded by Publius Metilius Nepos, and Quintus Baebius Macer as Suffect consuls
