= Legio VI Ferrata =

Roman legion

- Map of the Roman Empire in AD 125, under emperor Hadrian, showing the Legio VI Ferrata stationed at Raphana (Abila, Jordan), in Syria province, from c. AD 106 until c. 136
- Active: 65 BC to at least AD 244
- Country: Roman Republic and Roman Empire
- Type: Roman legion (Marian)
- Role: Infantry assault
- Mascot: Bull

Commanders
- Notable commanders: Julius Caesar; Mark Antony; Gnaeus Domitius Corbulo

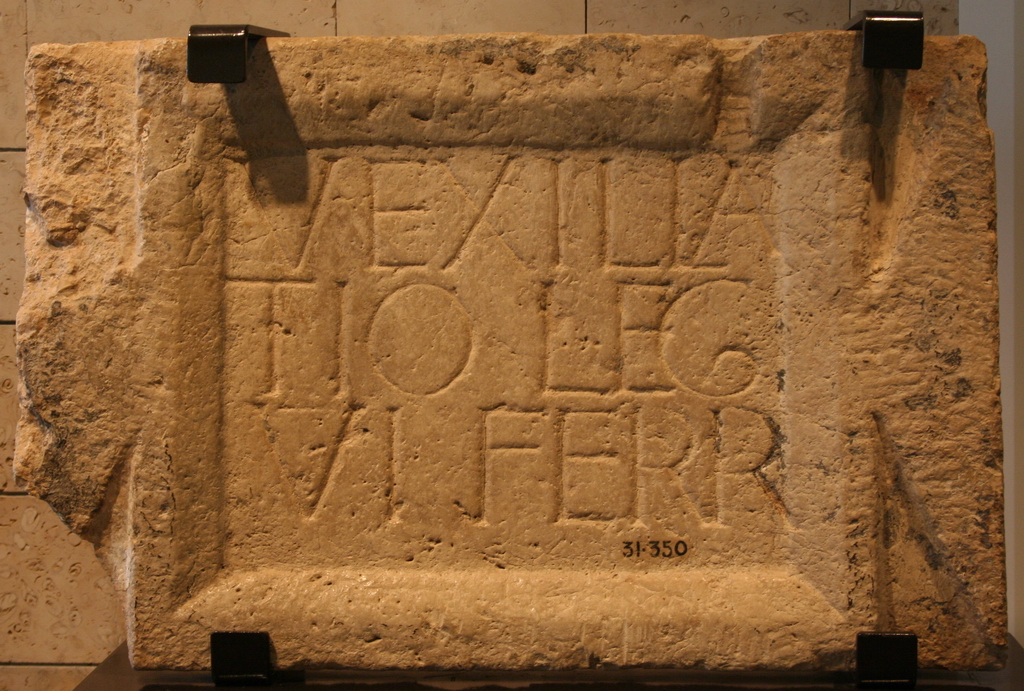
Legionary inscription: "VEXILLA TIO LEG VI FERR" ("Detachment of Legion VI Ferrata"), Hecht Museum, Haifa, Israel

Legio VI Ferrata ("Sixth Ironclad Legion") was a legion of the Imperial Roman army. In 30 BC it became part of the emperor Augustus's standing army. It continued in existence into the 4th century. A Legio VI fought in the Roman Republican civil wars of the 40s and 30s BC. Sent to garrison the province of Judaea, it remained there for the next two centuries.

The Legion was also known as Fidelis Constans, meaning "loyal and steadfast". It is unclear when this title was given, but several sources indicate that it may have been in the 1st century AD. The symbol for Legio VI Ferrata was the bull. It also carried the symbolic she-wolf with Romulus and Remus.

== History ==
=== Under Caesar ===
Raised in Cisalpine Gaul in 52 BC by Gaius Julius Caesar the Sixth Legion served with him during his tenure as governor and fought at the Siege of Alesia, before being stationed at Cabillonum (Chalon-sur-Saône) in 51 BC and then suppressing a revolt of the Carnutes at Cenabum (Orleans) in 50 BC. In 49 BC it was transferred to Spain to fight in the civil wars, where it earned the title "Hispaniensis" after fighting at Ilerda.

Later seeing action at the Battle of Pharsalus in 48 BC, Julius Caesar took the 6th to Alexandria to settle the dispute in Egypt with Cleopatra. Alexandria was besieged, and the 6th suffered a number of casualties, losing approximately two-thirds of its strength. Caesar eventually triumphed when reinforcements under Mithridates of Pergamum arrived.

Caesar took his "Veteran Sixth Legion" with him to Syria and Pontus.

"When Caesar reached Pontus he gathered all his forces together in one spot. They were modest in number and experience of war, with the exception of the veteran Sixth Legion, which he had brought with him from Alexandria; but this had gone through such toil and danger and been so reduced in size, in part by the difficulties of the marches and voyages, and in part by the frequency of campaigning, that it contained less than a thousand men..."

The Legion served in Pontus under Caesar in 48 and 47 BC. This culminated in the Battle of Zela where victory was won by Legio VI.

"The origin of our victory lay in the bitter and intense hand-to-hand battle joined on the right wing, where the veteran Sixth Legion was stationed".

"Caesar was quite overjoyed at such a victory, although he had been victorious in many battles. He had brought a major war to an astonishingly rapid end... He ordered the Sixth Legion back to Italy to receive their rewards and honors..."

During Caesar's African war against Scipio in 46 BC, the Sixth Legion deserted en masse from Scipio to reinforce Caesar and fought under him.

=== Under Mark Antony ===
The legion was disbanded in 45 BC after the battle of Munda, establishing a colony at Arelate (Arles), but was re-formed by Lepidus the following year (44 BC) and was handed over to Mark Antony the year after. Following the defeat of the republican generals Cassius and Brutus in successive battles at Philippi in 42 BC and the subsequent division of control between Mark Antony and Caesar's nephew and heir Octavian, a colony was again formed from retired veterans at Beneventum in 41 BC, and the remainder of Legio VI Ferrata was taken by Mark Antony to the East where it garrisoned Judea.

=== Two legions under Mark Antony and Octavian ===
Another Sixth Legion, Legio VI Victrix, evidently saw action at Perusia in 41 BC, which presents us with a problem because the official Legio VI Ferrata was at that moment with Mark Antony in the East;

"Octavian did not hesitate to duplicate legionary numerals already in use by Antony. The latter had serving with him Legio V Alaudae, Legio VI Ferrata and Legio X Equestris. Soon we find Octavian's army boasting of a Legio V (the later Macedonica), Legio VI (the later Victrix) and Legio X (soon to be Fretensis). Of these, Legio V and Legio X, and less certainly Legio VI, bore under the empire a bull-emblem which would normally indicate a foundation by Caesar; but the true Caesarian legions with these numerals (Alaudae, Ferrata and Equestris) were with Antony."

It would seem, therefore, that Octavian had used the veterans of Caesar's Sixth Legion, this time from those left at Beneventum, to form the core of his own Sixth Legion used at Perusia.

Later Legio VI Ferrata fought in Antony's Parthian War in 36 BC.

During the war between Antony and Octavian the Legio VI's Ferrata and Victrix found themselves on opposing sides at the Battle of Actium in 31 BC. Legio VI Ferrata was severely mauled by Octavian's forces. Following the battle, another colony of veterans seems to have been created at Byllis in Illyricum, probably together with soldiers from other legions, and the remainder of VI Ferrata was moved to Syria/Judea where it was to remain, while Legio VI Victrix was sent to Spain.

=== In Judea and Palaestina ===
From 54 AD to 68 AD the Sixth Legion Ferrata served under Gnaeus Domitius Corbulo at Artaxata and Tigranocerta (in Armenia) against the Parthians. In 69 AD the Sixth Legion returned to Judea and fought in the Jewish War (66–73). As the War wound down, the Legion was largely responsible for Mucianus' victory over the forces of Vitellius during the brief Civil War following the death of Nero.

In 106 AD a vexillatio of the legion participated at the final decisive battle against Dacia (see battle of Sarmisegetusa). The core of the legion can be placed at Bostra in Nabataea under Aulus Cornelius Palma Frontonianus. In 136 AD, after the Bar Kokhba revolt, the Legion was stationed in a camp known as Legio, recently found near ancient Megiddo, in Syria Palaestina – a strategic point on Palestine's Via Maris. It was briefly sent to Africa during the reign of Antoninus Pius. In 150 AD the Legion was once again in Syria Palaestina, and an inscription found dedicated to Legio VI Ferrata places them still there in 215 AD. Coins of Philip the Arab, found in Caesarea Maritima, indicate the Legion was still present ca 244 AD.

Under Diocletian, it might have moved to the base of Adrou (Udruh, Jordan), on the south of Limes Arabicus, to defend an area that would become Palaestina Tertia. The legion is not present in the Notitia Dignitatum and was likely disbanded before 395.

== Attested members ==
Name	Rank	Time frame	Province	Source
Lucius Artorius Castus	centurio	2nd century	Syria Palaestina	CIL III, 1919
Quintus Glitius Atilius Agricola	legatus legionis	c. 80		CIL V, 6974,CIL V, 6975
Lucius Domitius Apollinaris	legatus legionis	87–91	Syria	IGR III.558 = TAM II.569
Gaius Julius Proculus	legatus legionis	104/106	Syria	CIL X, 6658
Gaius Bruttius Praesens	legatus legionis	114/115		
Marcus Flavius Postumus	legatus legionis	between 145 and 161	Syria Palaestina	CIL VIII, 7044
Quintus Antistius Adventus	legatus legionis	?159-?162	Syria Palaestina	AE 1893, 88 = ILS 8977
Tiberius Claudius Subatianus Proculus	legatus legionis	c. 206	Syria Palaestina	AE 1911, 107 = ILS 9488
Lucius Junius L.f. Moderatus	tribunus angusticlavius	before 70		CIL IX, 235 = ILS 2923
Lucius Conetanius L.f. Proculus Carsulas	tribunus angusticlavius	before 117		SEG-28, 1269 = AE 1950, 190
Marcus Porcius M.f. Aprus	tribunus angusticlavius			CIL II, 4238
Lucius Vecilius C.f. Modestus	tribunus angusticlavius	between AD 1 and 100		CIL III, 8261 = ILS 2733
Pacuvius	tribunus laticlavius (?)	c. 19	Syria	Tacitus Annales, ii.79
Sergius Rusticus Apronianus	tribunus laticlavius	before 152		CIL III, 292 = ILS 8976; CIL III, 6814 = ILS 8976a
Lucius Sergius L.f. Paullus	tribunus laticlavius			AE 2002, 1457

== Legacy ==
The name 'Lajjun', associated with the location of the legionary camp, derived from 'Legion'. In Ottoman times a Khan erected in that location was known as "Khan al-Lajun", and a Palestinian village of that name existed there until the Arab-Israeli war of 1947-49, when it was depopulated.

The popular Russian song Eagle of Sixth Legion dedicated to the Legion.

== Archaeology ==
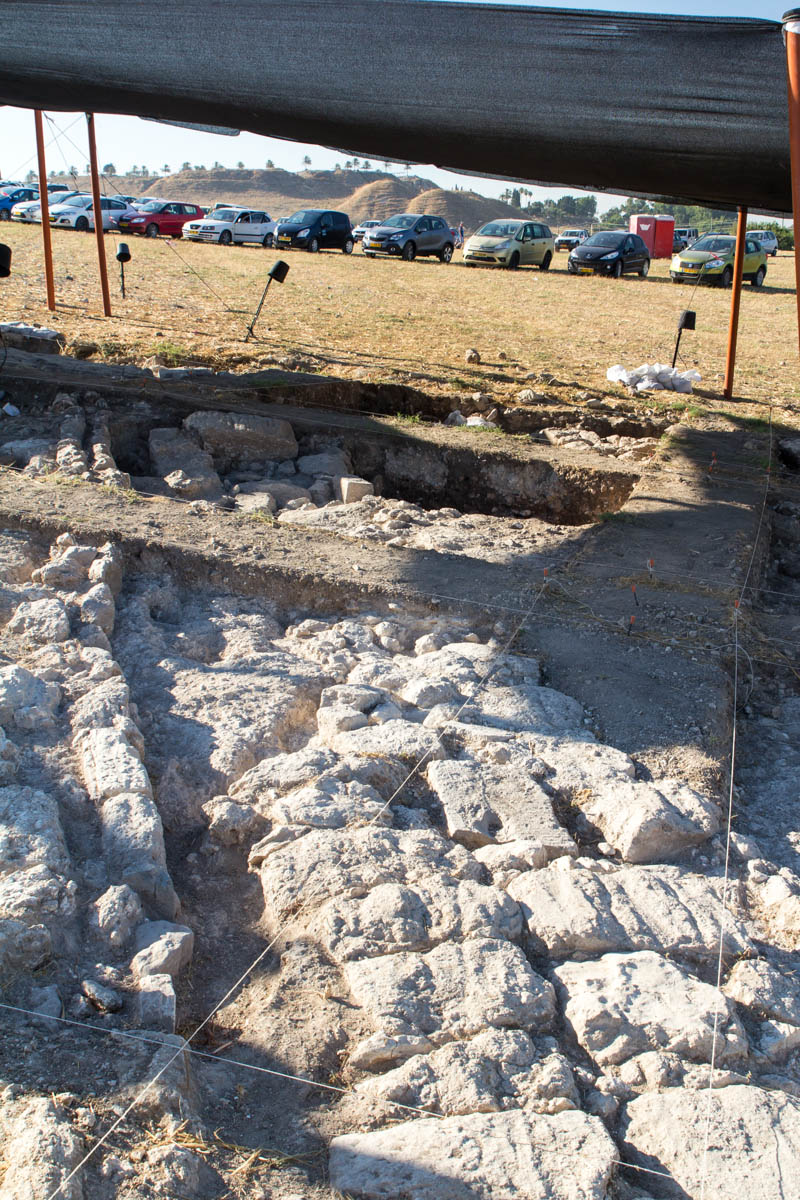
Excavations of Legio VI castra near Megiddo Junction, July 2015. Tel Megiddo in the background

Until the 20th century, the exact location of the castra (“camp” in the sense of a permanent military base) of the Sixth Legion had not been confirmed, but textual evidence placed it in the Jezreel Valley along the road from Caesarea Maritima to Beth Shean, in the vicinity of Meggido. Surveys conducted by Israeli archaeologist Yotam Tepper identified Roman remains in the region, including coins and roof tiles stamped with the name of the Sixth Legion. In 2010 and 2011, Tepper teamed up with the Jezreel Valley Regional Project and the Center for Research and Archaeology of the Southern Levant. Together, Jessie A. Pincus and Timothy DeSmet conducted a ground-penetrating radar and Electromagnetic survey of this area and published their results with the accompanying archaeogeophysical interpretation. With the results of those two surveys the collective team decided upon the best areas for excavation during the 2013 field season. Thus in 2013, the team excavated the Legio VI Ferrata camp, uncovering defensive earthworks, a circumvallation rampart, barracks areas and artifacts including roof tiles stamped with the name of the Sixth Legion, coins and fragments of scale armor.

== See also ==
- List of Roman legions
