= Vicirius =

Vicirius is a name. Notable people with the name include:

- Aulus Vicirius Martialis, Roman senator
- Aulus Vicirius Proculus, Roman senator
