= Lucius Maecius Postumus =

Roman senator

Lucius Maecius Postumus was a Roman senator, who held several offices in service to the emperor. He was suffect consul in the nundinium of July-August 98 as the colleague of Aulus Vicirius Martialis. Postumus is known entirely from inscriptions.

Postumus is also attested as a member of the Arval Brethren, and the dates he is recorded as attending their ceremonies in their surviving records, the Acta Arvalia, provide some indication about his age. The Acta first mention his presence in January 69, and thus was admitted to that collegia before then. He is present over the following years through May 105; a gap in the Acta Arvalia follows, and when their records pick up again in the year 117 his name no longer appears. It can be surmised that Maecius Postumus died between those dates.

== Life ==
The origins of Postumus are disputed. In her doctoral dissertation, Sarah Hillebrand suggests he came from Gallia Narbonensis; however, John D. Grainger asserts Postumus was a native of Italy.

His cursus honorum is partially known from an inscription recovered at Antioch. The first office Postumus held was in the decemviri stlitibus judicandis, one of the four boards that formed the vigintiviri; membership in one of these four boards was a preliminary and required first step toward gaining entry into the Roman Senate. This was followed by service as a military tribune in Legio XIII Gemina. After this, Postumus served as quaestor in attendance to the emperors Vespasian and Titus; in her doctoral dissertation Sarah Hillebrand dated this to the year 79, although Postumus could have held it any year Vespasian was emperor since his son Titus was considered his co-emperor. Upon completion of this traditional Republican magistracy Postumus would be enrolled in the Senate. The inscription breaks off after telling us he had been a plebeian tribune.

Postumus' tenure as praetor can be deduced. This office was usually held when the Senator reached the age of 30, or in the year 84. It is unusual that 14 years separate this magistracy from his acceding to the consulate; the more normal time between the two offices was five to ten years. The reason for this might have been that Postumus was in disfavor with the emperor at the time, Domitian. Another is that Postumus may have refused to participate in service to Domitian, as had a number of other senators such as Quintus Corellius Rufus. One more office can be deduced for Postumus: legatus legionis or commander of one of the legions stationed in Syria, which would explain the presence of his inscription in that province.

Grainger notes the composition of the consuls selected for the year 98 is significant, as it was the first year where the emperor Nerva could select all of the men to accede to the consulate; he could not alter the composition of the previous year, which had been drawn up by the deceased Domitian, without gratuitously offending people. Although it was a largely ceremonial office, being consul for even part of the year bestowed much prestige in a status-preoccupied society. Yet the composition of that year is unusual, both in having twelve names -- far more than was usual for that decade -- and having Trajan as ordinary consul for six months. Five men thus were associated with Nerva's heir apparent for the first half of the year, while the second half is shared by three pairs of consuls. Grainger argues that Nerva's arrangement originally comprised the consuls of the second half, with Sextus Julius Frontinus likely as Nerva's original choice for a colleague; Grainger notes that Frontinus enjoyed a third consulate only two years later, and as ordinary consul, possibly to repay Frontinus for allowing Trajan to take his place in the original arrangement.

Where the consuls of the first half of 98 all are notable senators enjoying their second consulships, Grainger notes that the six populating the last half, such as Postumus, are "generally Italian nonentities, the professional senators who gained their posts by virtue of their wealth and lived on long enough to become governors of Asia or Africa when their turn came."

Postumus' life after his consulate until his death after the year 105 is presently a blank.

Political offices
Preceded by Gaius Pomponius Pius, and Imp. Caesar Nerva Trajanus II	Suffect consul of the Roman Empire; 98 with Aulus Vicirius Martialis	Succeeded by Gaius Pomponius Rufus Acilius Priscus Coelius Sparsus, and Gnaeus Pompeius Ferox Licinianus as suffect consuls
