= Gaius Bruttius Praesens Lucius Fulvius Rusticus =

Roman senator (68–140)

Gaius Bruttius Praesens Lucius Fulvius Rusticus (68–140 AD) was a Roman senator of the reigns of the emperors Trajan, Hadrian and Antoninus Pius. A friend of Pliny the Younger and Hadrian, he was twice consul, governed provinces, commanded armies and ended his career as Urban prefect of Rome. Bruttius’ life and career left few coherent traces in the literary record, but a number of inscriptions, including his complete cursus honorum, fills out the picture considerably.

== Life ==
Pliny, writing to Praesens, refers to him as a Lucanian and an inscription concerning his son has been found at Volceii in Lucania. His father has been identified as Lucius Bruttius Maximus, proconsul of Cyprus in AD 80. As Praesens was the first of his family to hold the consulship, he was considered a novus homo. The element "Lucius Fulvius Rusticus" in his polyonymous name is commonly agreed to be his maternal grandfather's name, thus connecting Praesens to the Fulvii Rustici (see Fulvia gens), a senatorial family from Cisalpine Gaul.

From an inscription recovered in Mactaris (modern Siliana in Tunisia), his career in imperial service can be reconstructed. As a teenager, Praesens was a member of the tresviri capitales, one of the magistracies that comprised the vigintiviri. This was the least desirable office to hold, for men who held that office rarely had a successful career: Anthony Birley could find only five tresviri capitales who went on to be governors of consular imperial provinces. However, it is clear that Praesens succeeded despite this inauspicious beginning. Next he received the commission for the tribunus laticlavius in Legio I Minervia, when he led a vexillation from Germania Inferior to Pannonia and earned dona militaria, or military decorations, for service on the Danube in the emperor Domitian’s campaigns.

He served as quaestor in Hispania Baetica, and it may have been at this time that he first became friends with the young Hadrian, but thereafter he retired from public life. In his book on the Roman Senate in this period, Richard Talbert notes that some senators in this period, including Praesens, abandoned their efforts at climbing the chain of offices, discouraged at the lengthy wait they faced to achieve the office of either praetor or consul.

Pliny in 107 wrote to Praesens urging him to no longer remain on his rural estates in Campania and Lucania but to return to Rome and to public life. His language suggests Praesens was an Epicurean in his tastes and beliefs, something he shared with Hadrian. Praesens is next heard of in the winter of 114/115, during Trajan's Parthian war, commanding Legio VI Ferrata, during which, according to a fragment of the Parthica of Arrian he marched in deep snow (having secured snowshoes from native guides) across the Armenian Taurus Mountains to reach Tigranakert. After a spell as curator of the Via Latina, he was legatus pro praetore or governor of Cilicia when Trajan died in that province in 117. Two fragmentary military diplomas, published in 2002, attest he was suffect consul as the colleague of Quintus Aburnius Caedicianus; while there is insufficient text to precisely date this document, this pair are thought to have held the fasces at some point in the months November–December 120 or September–December 121.

Subsequently, Bruttius was curator operum publicorum, or overseer of the public works of Rome, then governed Cappadocia followed by a tenure as governor of Moesia Inferior from 124 to 128. He was Proconsul of Africa in the 130s and appears to have been governor of Syria in 136 or 137, anomalous for a senior former Proconsul, but perhaps empowered to conduct diplomacy with the Parthians. In a resplendent end to a long career, his second consulship came in 139, as colleague of the new emperor Antoninus Pius, and at the same time he became Praefectus urbi, succeeding Servius Cornelius Scipio Salvidienus Orfitus. However Praesens died in this office the following year, as revealed by a fragment of the Fasti Ostienses published in 1982.

We know from the Tunisian inscription that Praesens was a member of the Quindecimviri sacris faciundis, one of the more prestigious collegia of Roman priesthoods. Eusebius of Caesarea and John Malalas both cite a writer called 'Bruttius' or 'Boutios' as a source for events in the reign of Domitian.

== Family ==
In the letter mentioned above, Pliny alludes to Praesens' wife, whom he describes as a native of Campania; based on the name of their son, her name has been inferred to be "Laberia". Authorities differ whether she should be identified with Laberia Hostilia Crispina, a rich heiress and daughter of Manius Laberius Maximus. Not enough is known about Crispina to say whether she was from Campania, which would clinch the identification, or from elsewhere. If from elsewhere, Laberia would be his second wife.

In either case, Laberia bore Praesens a son, Lucius Fulvius Gaius Bruttius Praesens Laberius Maximus, who became consul in 153 and 180. Through his son, Praesens became the paternal grandfather of at least two people: the future Roman empress Bruttia Crispina, who married Commodus; and the consul Lucius Bruttius Quintius Crispinus.

== See also ==
- List of Roman consuls

== Sources ==
Political offices
Preceded by Publius Cassius Secundus, and Publius Delphius Peregrinus Alfius Allenius Maxmius Curtius Valerianus Proculus Marcus Nonius Mucianus as Suffect Consuls	Consul of the Roman Empire; 139 with Antoninus Pius II	Succeeded by Lucius Minicius Natalis Quadronius Verus, and Lucius Claudius Proculus as Suffect Consuls
