= Lucius Bruttius Quintius Crispinus =

Second century Roman senator and consul

Lucius Bruttius Quintius Crispinus was a Roman senator who lived in the second century AD. He was ordinary consul in 187, and Lucius Roscius Aelianus Paculus was his colleague.

Crispinus was a member of the Bruttia gens, who originated in Volceii, Lucania, Italy. His father was Gaius Bruttius Praesens, consul under Antoninus Pius; Olli Salomies suggests that his mother's name, which is otherwise unknown, was "Quintia" based on his nomen "Quintius", but Salomies has no further ideas about her identity. Crispinus' paternal grandparents were the consul and senator Gaius Bruttius Praesens, and Laberia Hostilia Crispina, the daughter of Manius Laberius Maximus. His sister was Bruttia Crispina, who married the Emperor Commodus.

He is generally thought to be the father of Gaius Bruttius Praesens, consul in 217.

Political offices
Preceded by Gaius Sabucius Maior Caecilianus; Valerius Senecio as suffect consuls	Consul of the Roman Empire; 187 with Lucius Roscius Aelianus Paculus	Succeeded by Publius Seius Fuscianus; Marcus Servilius Silanus
