= Sextus Hermentidius Campanus =

Late 1st/early 2nd century Roman senator and governor

Legate of Iudaea
- In office 93–97
- Preceded by: Gnaeus Pompeius Longinus
- Succeeded by: Tiberius Claudius Atticus Herodes

Personal details
- Born: c. 1st century Roman Empire
- Died: c. after 108

Sextus Hermentidius Campanus was a Roman senator, who was active during the Flavian dynasty. He was the 6th legate of Judaea from 93 to 97 and suffect consul in the nundinium of July to August 97 as the colleague of Lucius Domitius Apollinaris. He is known entirely from inscriptions.

== Biography ==
His gentilicium "Hermentidius", derived from the god Hermes, suggests that Campanus' origins lie in Cappadocia, where there is evidence of a number of names incorporating the name of that deity. In any case, he is the only member of his family known to have acceded to the consulate.

The only office Campanus is known to have held, other than his consulate, is legatus legionis or commander of the Legio X Fretensis between the years 93 and 97, which was stationed during those years in Jerusalem. Command of this legion also made Campanus the de facto legate of Judea.

Edward Champlin has restored his name in the Testamentum Dasumii, which would attest that Campanus was alive at least as late as the year 108.

Political offices
Preceded by Marcus Annius Verus, and Lucius Neratius Priscus as Suffect consuls	Suffect consul of the Roman Empire; 97 with Lucius Domitius Apollinaris	Succeeded by Quintus Glitius Atilius Agricola, and Lucius Pomponius Maternus as Suffect consuls
