= Primus pilus =

Roman military rank

The primus pilus (lit. "first maniple of triarii") or primipilus was the senior centurion of the first cohort in a Roman legion, a formation of five double-strength centuries of 160 men each; he was a career soldier and advisor to the legate. The primus pilus would remain in command for one year. They could continue to serve in the army after their term ended if there was a vacancy in command or if they wished to become an independent commander of an auxilia unit or the praefectus castrorum.

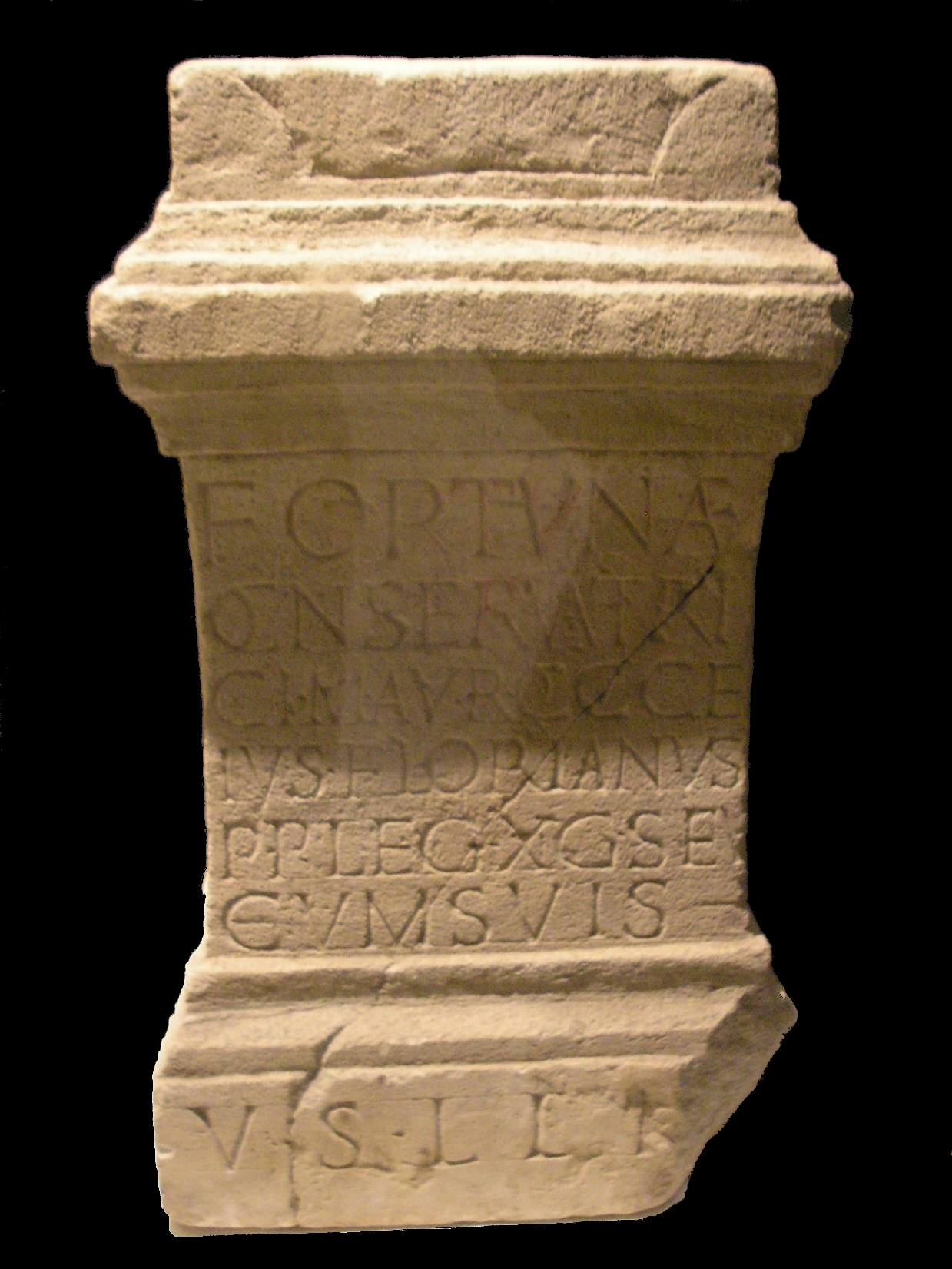
Altar dedicated to Fortuna Conservatrix by Marcus Aurelius Cocceius Florianus, who was Primus Pilus of the Legio X Gemina at the time of Severus Alexander in Vindobona

During the Roman Empire, the emperor Claudius created the office of primus pilus iterum. To become the primus pilus iterum an officer must have formerly served as a tribune in the vigiles, cohortes urbanae, or Praetorian Guard. The primus pilus iterum would hold the responsibility of a praefectus castrorum but with higher pay.

The primus pilus was a well paid position, earning around four times the standard centurion salary. They could accumulate enough wealth to become part of the equestrian class. Even if they failed to gather such wealth, they were promoted to the equestrian class after retiring.

Only eight officers in a fully officered legion outranked the primus pilus: The legate (legatus legionis), commanding the legion; the senior tribune (tribunus laticlavius); the camp prefect (praefectus castrorum); and the five junior tribunes (tribuni angusticlavii).

It is unknown how promotion worked in the legion. Given that there were 60 centurions in the legion, it remains a subject of academic debate (for more than a century) how those officers made their way up the ranks to the position of primus pilus. This promotion problem is the active subject of scholarly debate.

The primus pilus centurion had a place in the war councils along with the military tribunes and the legate.

During the Roman Empire, the army was also used for construction programs. The centurions were probably skilled and educated to help with this. The Emperor Gaius sent a primus pilus to survey a canal project, indicating some amount of faith in the centurion's abilities.

== Sources ==
- Radin, Max (April 1915). "The Promotion of Centurions in Caesar's Army". The Classical Journal. 10 (7): 300–311. JSTOR 3287327.
