= Lucius Domitius Apollinaris =

1st century Roman senator and consul suffectus

Lucius Domitius Apollinaris was a Roman senator of the late first century. He is best known for his literary activities, as an acquaintance of Pliny the Younger and a patron of the poet Martial. He was appointed suffect consul in the nundinium of July to August 97 with Sextus Hermentidius Campanus as his colleague.

Martial dedicated three of the books of his epigrams to Apollinaris: the fourth, seventh, and eleventh.

== Life ==
The family origins of Apollinaris lie in Vercellae in Northwestern Italy. Thanks to the ingenuous identification of Apollinaris with the subject of a headless inscription found in Asia Minor by Werner Eck, we know most of the earliest steps of his cursus honorum. Apollinaris' first recorded republican magistracy was quaestor, which was followed by plebeian tribune, and praetor. Then he was appointed one of the nine curatores viarum, or curator of the public roads, in Italy. This was followed by two terms of service as legatus legionis or commander, first of the Legio XVI Flavia Firma, then of Legio VI Ferrata which was stationed in Syria. Eck suspects his command of Legio VI was during the governorship of Publius Valerius Patruinus (AD 87–91), for Patruinus was the father of Apollinaris' wife, Valeria Vetilla. After concluding his command of Legio VI Ferrata, Apollinaris returned to Rome to serve as prefect of the aerarium militare for three years.

At this point we know of his career from other sources. It has been long known that Apollinaris was governor of Lycia et Pamphylia from 93 to 96. An inscription recovered from Xanthos by A. Ballard records his name and the other members of his family, who are assumed to have been living in Lycia with him. After his return from Lycia, Apollinaris returned to Rome. It is at this time that we have one of our earliest glimpses of him. In a letter to Quadratus (Epistulae, IX.13), Pliny recalls his prosecution after the assassination of Domitian of the delator or informer Publicius Certus. One of the five senators who had spoken against this prosecution was Apollinaris; Pliny's description of him as "consul designate" firmly places it in this period. Despite Apollinaris' speech, Pliny was able to convince the senate to approve the prosecution. Although the emperor Nerva failed to act on the motion to prosecute, Certus was passed over in consideration for a consulship, and in any event fell ill and died soon afterwards.

Our next glimpse of Apollinaris is from one of Martial's poems (10.12), addressed to him after stepping down as consul.

Apparently the disagreement over Publicius Certus was not sharp enough to poison the friendship between Apollinaris and Pliny, for around the time of his consulate Pliny wrote to him in support of Sextius Erucius' candidacy for plebeian tribune. Unfortunately, this is the last time we can assign a date to any mention of his activities.

Pliny addressed one more letter to Apollinaris. Apparently Pliny wrote to him about taking a vacation on his estate in Tuscany, and Apollinaris replied to this news with alarm for Pliny's health. The existing letter is a reply to explain his estate is located in a desirable region of Etruria, and includes an extensive description of Pliny's villa at Tifernum (the modern Città di Castello). In this letter, Pliny makes a pointed allusion to the location of his three rural estates, since we know through one of Martial's poems Apollinaris owned villas in several more fashionable locations that include Tusculum, Algidus, Praeneste, and Antium.

== Family ==
Apollinaris' family is better documented than those of most of his contemporaries. We know the name of his wife, Valeria Vetilla, the daughter of Publius Valerius Patruinus, suffect consul in the year 82. Two of their children are attested by inscriptions on a series of statues found in Xanthos; a third is surmised by Ronald Syme:

Together they had at least three children:

- Domitius Patruinus, whose daughter Domitia Vetilla married Lucius Roscius Paculus, suffect consul around 136.
- Domitius Seneca, who married Claudia Decmina; their son Domitius Seneca was governor of Lycia et Pamphylia c. 136
- Domitia Vettilla, a daughter or possibly granddaughter; she was the second wife of Lucius Neratius Marcellus, suffect consul in 95 and ordinary consul in 129. Their marriage allied the family with the more powerful gens Neratia.

Political offices
| Preceded by Marcus Annius Verus, and Lucius Neratius Priscus as Suffect consuls | Suffect consul of the Roman Empire; 97 with Sextus Hermentidius Campanus | Succeeded by Quintus Glitius Atilius Agricola, and Lucius Pomponius Maternus as Suffect consuls |
