= Publius Valerius Patruinus =

Publius Valerius Patruinus (died AD 91) was a Roman Senator, who flourished under the reign of Domitian. He was suffect consul in the nundinium of July–August 82 with Lucius Antonius Saturninus as his colleague. He is known entirely from inscriptions.

His origins lie at Ticinum in Transpadane Italy. The cursus honorum of Patruinus is known only in piecemeal. The first office he is attested as holding was not a civil office, but a religious one: he was co-opted into the sodales Augustales between the years 70 and 79. Following his consulate, Patruinus is thought to have been governor of the imperial province of Cappadocia. While Werner Eck supports this interpretation of the evidence, and dates his tenure from the year 83 to 85, Bernard Remy argues the evidence in support of this posting is shaky.

It is far more certain that Patruinus was governor to the important imperial province of Syria, which Eck dates from the year 86 to 89. Eck also dates to his governorship his son-in-law Lucius Domitius Apollinaris' command of Legio VI Ferrata. Remy reports Patruinus died in 91.

While we can know the name of his daughter, Valeria Vetilla, we can only speculate the name of Patruinus' wife was Vettia. Apparently he had no son, for there is evidence that his grandson assumed his name, as if he were adopted to continue the lineage.

Political offices
Preceded by Gaius Arinius Modestus, and ignotus as suffect consuls	Suffect consul of the Roman Empire; 82 with Lucius Antonius Saturninus	Succeeded by Marcus Larcius Magnus Pompeius Silo, and Titus Aurelius Quietus as suffect consuls
