= Quintus Baebius Macer =

2nd century Roman senator and official

Quintus Baebius Macer was a Roman senator active during the second half of the first century and the first half of the second century AD. He was suffect consul for the nundinium April to June 103 as the colleague of Publius Metilius Nepos, and Urban prefect of Rome. He was also a patron of the poet Martial and an acquaintance of Pliny the Younger. He was the recipient of a letter from Pliny where the writings of Pliny the Elder are listed, apparently in response to Macer's inquiry.

Baebius Macer's career is not completely known. Ronald Syme argues the date of his praetorship fell in the years 90 to 94. It is due to the poetry of Martial that we know of two of the offices he did hold: Macer was curator of the Via Appia around the year 95; then governor of Hispania Baetica, which Werner Eck dates to 100/101.

After he returned from Baetica, Macer was active in the Senate as an orator. Pliny mentions two occasions where he participated in the proceedings: during the first, which was prior to his consulate, Macer proposed one punishment in the prosecution of Julius Bassus for mismanagement of the province of Bithynia and Pontus; the second regarded money Marcus Egnatius Marcellinus owed to an imperial scribe upon completion of his service as quaestor in an unnamed province. As the scribe had died before the money could be paid, Macer proposed the money be paid to the scribe's heirs, while another senator proposed it should be paid to the imperial treasury.

Macer acceded to the office of urban prefect at an unknown time after his consulship, but definitely before the death of emperor Trajan. Soon after Hadrian had ascended to the throne, according to the Historia Augusta, his old guardian Publius Acilius Attianus wrote to Hadrian that he should have Macer killed because the latter man, along with two others currently in exile, opposed his rule. Nevertheless, Hadrian did not act on this advice. His life after he left the office of Urban prefect is lost to history.

Political offices
Preceded by Quintus Glitius Atilius Agricola II, and Manius Laberius Maximus II	Suffect consul of the Roman Empire; AD 103 with Publius Metilius Nepos	Succeeded by Marcus Flavius Aper, and Gaius Trebonius Proculus Mettius Modestus as suffect consuls
