= Sallustius Lucullus =

Governor of Roman Britain during the late 1st century AD

Sallustius Lucullus (possibly died 89 or 93 AD) was a governor of Roman Britain during the late 1st century AD, holding office after Gnaeus Julius Agricola, although it is unclear whether he was the immediate successor or if there was another unknown governor in between. Lucullus has been described as "an enigma", as the only definite fact known about him is Suetonius' report that the emperor Domitian had him executed for allowing a new type of lance to be named after him.

Anything more about Lucullus is conjecture or inference: for example, since every other known governor of Roman Britain had been a consul prior to being appointed governor, it is reasonable to assume Lucullus also had been consul; since all of the consuls from the year 85 until past the death of Domitian are known, he must have been consul before the year 85. Although it is not known in which year he was executed, Sheppard Frere wrote, "the most likely date for his execution is 89, and the most likely reason is that he was thought to be involved in the conspiracy of Saturninus, legate of Upper Germany which was suppressed that spring." However, Domitian is also known to have executed a number of Senators in the year 93 for a number of reasons, so that is also a likely date.

It is also possible that Lucullus was the grandson of King Cunobeline (died 40 AD) and was also likely the son of Adminius (died after 43 AD), both of the Catuvellauni tribe.

== Enigma ==
Nothing is known of him for certain other than the story recorded by Suetonius. This story may mask another reason for Lucullus' execution; that so little is known has led to a number of theories about him.

Ronald Syme, noting the difficulty of polyonymous names, proposed identifying Lucullus with a known suffect consul of 89, Publius Sallustius Blaesus. Blaesus is known from the correspondence of Pliny the Younger and a number of inscriptions, most notably the Acta Arvalia, which record his presence at their ceremonies during the years 77 through 91, when there is a gap in the Acta, and when it resumes in 101, Blaesus is missing. For this and related reasons Syme identified the two as the same person. His arguments were accepted by later experts, such as Anthony Birley and Edward Champlin. However, P. Conole and Brian Jones point out since the records of the Arval Brethren "record his presence in Rome during every year of the first half of Domitian's reign for which complete minutes have survived, it is difficult to see how he could have managed to gain sufficient provincial experience in praetorian posts to merit appointment to Britain, an Imperial consular province."

A second theory was proposed by Dr. Miles Russell of Bournemouth University. An inscription from Chichester, recorded by Samuel Woodford in his Inscriptionum Romano-Britannicarum Conllectio (1658) but since lost, refers to Sallustius Lucullus, giving his praenomen as Gaius and describing him as a propraetorian legate of the emperor Domitian. Another inscription from Chichester, discovered in 1923, refers to a "Lucullus, son of Amminus". Russell argues that this is the same Lucullus, and that his father was the native British prince Amminus, son of Cunobelinus, who fled to Rome c. 40. He also argues that Fishbourne Roman Palace, near Chichester, was built for Sallustius Lucullus as governor, rather than, as is often argued, for the client king Tiberius Claudius Cogidubnus. Although other archaeologists have dated the construction of the palace to c. 73, Russell's reinterpretation of the ground plan and finds leads him to date the palace after 92, which would be consistent with Lucullus rather than Cogidubnus as its occupant. However, other scholars argue against Russell's identification of the Lucullus of either inscription with the Roman governor. Woodford's missing inscription was dismissed as a fake by R. G. Collingwood and R. P. Wright in their Roman Inscriptions of Britain (1965): its mention of Domitian, whose name was removed from public inscriptions following his damnatio memoriae, argues for its inauthenticity, moreover the governors of Britain were ex-consuls, not ex-praetors. Russell's restoration of the second inscription (CIL VII, 10) produces a text which does not follow Roman naming conventions, and the altar the inscription is part of is not worthy of either a Celtic prince or a Roman governor, and omits any mention of the dedicant's rank.

A third theory was proposed by Conole and Jones, identifying this Lucullus with the Lucius Lucullus who was proconsul of Hispania Baetica, and a student of marine life, at the time Pliny the Elder wrote his Natural History (c. 77). This Lucullus would have been of appropriate rank to be appointed governor of Britain at the right date. Moreover, since it appears that although they are not the same person, Sallustius Blaesus is a relative of Lucullus, and Blaesus was appointed suffect consul the same year of Saturninus' unsuccessful revolt, Lucullus' execution had nothing to do with Saturninus' actions. Brian Jones develops this scenario further in his study of Domitian. There Jones states that Gaius Julius Karus was awarded dona militaria comprising three crowns and a silver spearshaft for an otherwise unknown British war -- an exceptional decoration, and equivalent to the decorations Domitian awarded the man who crushed Saturninus' revolt. Jones proposes the following theory: Lucullus opposed Domitian's plans to move the frontier of Roman Britain south to a more defensible location; these views and associated acts were reported by Karus; the emperor Domitian saw this opposition as treason, and gave Karus orders to eliminate Lucullus, who was rewarded generously. Nevertheless, Jones re-iterates that this reconstruction of events surrounding Lucullus "should be regarded as speculative."

== Military activity ==
Archaeology can tell us something of Roman military activity in the years following Agricola's recall in 84. Sallustius (or his unknown predecessor, if one existed) may have attempted to consolidate Agricola's victories in Scotland by building the Glen Forts which Peter Salway dates to his rule. Forts at Ardoch and Dalswinton in southern Scotland, which Agricola had built, were extensively rebuilt in the late 80s and evidence of improvements of other military installations in the region points to a strong presence in the Scots Lowlands.

Inchtuthil was abandoned around this time as well, however, and it is likely that demands for troops elsewhere in the empire denied Sallustius enough manpower to continue to hold the far north. There is archaeological evidence that some of the Roman watchtowers in northern Scotland remained occupied until 90, however.

All in all, it is likely that troop shortages forced Sallustius to withdraw from northern Scotland but still permitted him to occupy the south.

Political offices
Preceded by Gnaeus Julius Agricola	Roman governors of Britain; 84-c. 89	Unknown Next known title holder: Aulus Vicirius Proculus
