= Publius Seius Fuscianus =

2nd century Roman consul and Praefectus urbi

Publius Seius Fuscianus (c. 120 – aft. 189) was a suffect consul c. 151, Praefectus urbi from 187 to 189, and consul ordinarius in 188. He was a childhood friend and schoolmate of Emperor Marcus Aurelius.

Géza Alföldy notes that Fuscianus and the colleague of his second consulate, Marcus Servilius Silanus, both were "highly qualified" and suggests that they might have been senior members of Marcus Aurelius' command during the Marcomannic Wars. Anthony Birley suggests that Fuscianus played a role in the preservation and publication of the emperor's Meditations.

== Sources ==
Political offices
Preceded by Lucius Bruttius Quintius Crispinus, and Lucius Roscius Aelianus Paculus	Consul of the Roman Empire; 188 with Marcus Servilius Silanus II	Succeeded by Dulius Silanus, and Quintus Servilius Silanus
