= Praefectus castrorum =

Roman army position responsible for logistics and training

The praefectus castrorum ("camp prefect") was, in the Roman army of the early Empire, the third most senior staff officer of the Roman legion after the legate (legatus; the commanding officer) and the senior military tribune (tribunus laticlavius; the executive officer), both of whom were from the senatorial class.

The camp prefect was the senior enlisted advisor at a command and quartermaster; responsible for military logistics and requisition (training, equipment procurement and maintenance, and construction of the camp, etc.), acting liaison between the legate and the centurions, but could command the legion whenever the senior commanders were absent. The post was usually held by a soldier promoted from the centurionate, having already served as a chief centurion (primus pilus) of a legion, and was therefore open to ordinary, plebeian citizens. Prefects of this rank, for example Sextus Vibius Gallus, were awarded prizes (dona) to mark their achievements.

This position was held by a highly experienced soldier of the plebeian class who had risen through all the lower ranks in Rome's army and they were often veterans of 20 years or more. Because they were in charge of the overall training, organization, and logistics of the legion, even the equestrian narrowest stripe tribunes had to answer to them. This would be one of the rare instances when Roman social classes were reversed, but was also a vital link which brought key insight and experience from the lower ranks up to the generals and commanders above.

The salary and status of a camp prefect was so high that upon discharge they could consider themselves elevated to the equestrian class; which made it a very competitive and well respected position that the average Roman citizen could aspire to hold. Modern military rank comparison are the command sergeant major and command master chief petty officer, both being responsible for enforcing standards on performance, training, and organization.

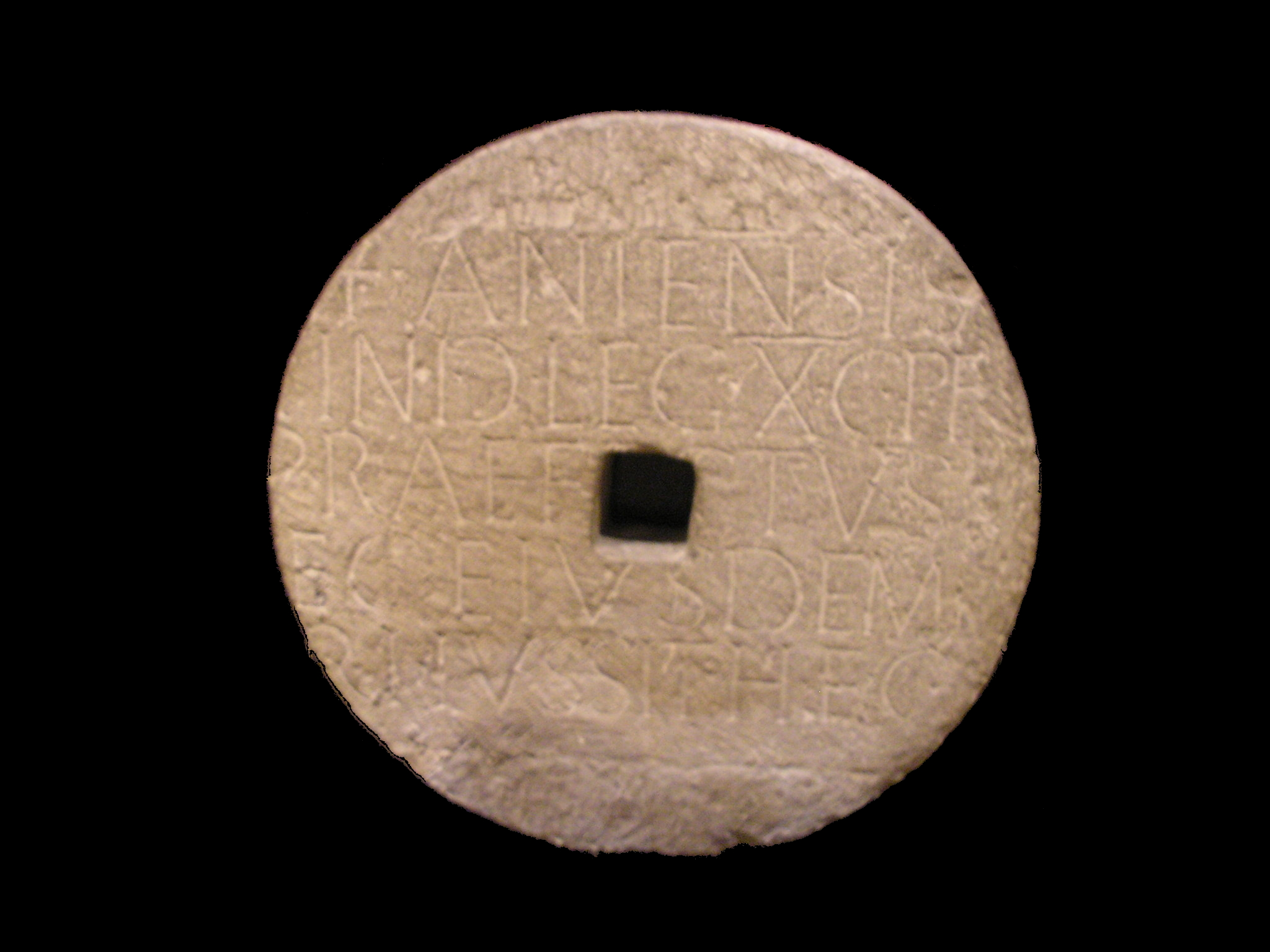
A Latin inscription from Vindobona pertaining to a praefectus castrorum

== See also ==
- Military logistics
- Praefectus
- Stratopedarches
