= Aulus Vicirius Martialis =

Aulus Vicirius Martialis was a Roman senator active during the reign of Trajan. He was suffect consul for the nundinium July-August 98 with Lucius Maecius Postumus as his colleague. Martialis is known only through surviving inscriptions.

Ronald Syme speculated that his gentilicium indicated an origin in either Erutria or Campania, noting a number of Vicirii attested in inscriptions from those parts of Italy. Martialis was the son of an Aulus Vicirius A.f. Proculus, attested as a military tribune of Legio IV Scythica and flamen Augusti during the reign of Claudius, and interred at Siena. Martialis is known to have had a brother, Aulus Vicirius Proculus, suffect consul in the year 89.

Martialis is known to have held only one office, as proconsular governor of Asia in 113/114. It had been thought at one time his brother Proculus instead had been proconsul, but R. Merkelbach has clearly shown Martialis was the governor.

Political offices
Preceded by Gaius Pomponius Pius, and Imp. Caesar Nerva Trajanus II	Suffect consul of the Roman Empire; 98 with Lucius Maecius Postumus	Succeeded by Gaius Pomponius Rufus Acilius Priscus Coelius Sparsus, and Gnaeus Pompeius Ferox Licinianus as suffect consuls
