= Gaius Sabucius Maior Caecilianus =

Roman senator

Gaius Sabucius Maior Caecilianus was a Roman senator who held a series of positions in the imperial service. His service was capped with the suffect consulship in 186 with Valerius Senecio as his colleague.

From the name of his grandson C. Sabucius Maior Plotinus Faustinus, who set up an inscription in his memory, it is clear his gentilicum is "Sabucius Maior". "Sabucius" is a rare Etruscan nomen (Anthony Birley provides two other known individuals of that gens), suggesting his origins lay in Italy and not one of the provinces.

An inscription recovered in Rome documents the cursus honorum of Sabucius. His earliest recorded offices were administrative posts following the praetorship. Next was his service as a juridicus in Roman Britain c. 172–175, which was followed by the prefecture of the aerarium militare c. 176–179. Birley dates his next offices, governorship of Gallia Belgica to c. 180–183, and proconsul of Achaea to 184/185.

Political offices
Preceded by Lucius Novius Rufus, and Lucius Annius Ravus as suffect consuls	Suffect consul of the Roman Empire; 186 with Valerius Senecio	Succeeded by Lucius Bruttius Quintius Crispinus, and Lucius Roscius Aelianus Paculus as ordinary consuls
