= Aulus Vicirius Proculus =

1st century Roman senator, consul and governor of Roman Britain

Aulus Vicirius Proculus was a Roman senator active during the last half of the first century AD. He was suffect consul for the nundinium September to December 89 with Manius Laberius Maximus as his colleague. Proculus is known only through surviving inscriptions.

Ronald Syme speculated that his gentilicium indicated an origin in either Erutria or Campania, noting a number of Vicirii attested in inscriptions from those parts of Italy. Proculus was the son of an Aulus Vicirius A.f. Proculus, attested as a military tribune of Legio IV Scythica and flamen Augusti during the reign of Claudius, who was buried at Siena. Proculus is known to have had a brother, Aulus Vicirius Martialis, suffect consul in the year 98.

Only one office from Proculus' senatorial career is known, from a military diploma studied and published in 2008. This document attests that Vicirius Proculus was governor of Roman Britain in the year 93, five years after his consulate.

Political offices
Preceded by Publius Sallustius Blaesus, and Marcus Peducaeus Saenianus as suffect consuls	Suffect consul of the Roman Empire; 89 with Manius Laberius Maximus	Succeeded by Domitian XV, and Marcus Cocceius Nerva II as ordinary consuls
Unknown Last known title holder: Sallustius Lucullus	Roman governors of Britain c. 93	Unknown Next known title holder: Publius Metilius Nepos
