= Manius Laberius Maximus =

Late 1st/early 2nd AD century Roman senator, consul and general

Manius Laberius Maximus was a Roman senator and general, who was active during the reigns of Domitian and Trajan. He was twice consul: the first time he was suffect consul in the nundinium of September to December 89 AD as the colleague of Aulus Vicirius Proculus; the second time as ordinary consul in 103 as a colleague to the Emperor Trajan.

He was a member of a family that originated in Lanuvium, where his presumed grandfather, Lucius Laberius Maximus, was a magistrate. His father, also Lucius Laberius Maximus, was a high equestrian official who was successively praefectus annonae, Prefect of Egypt and Praetorian prefect in the years 80 to 84. His mother is unknown. Lucius' achievements enabled his son Manius to be adlected to the senatorial order.

== Life ==
There was a considerable gap between his consulate and the first known appointment Maximus enjoyed, governor of Moesia Inferior, which he held from the year 100 to 102. While governor, Maximus served as a general in Trajan's First Dacian War. During the hostilities a slave of his, Callidromus, was captured by the Dacians: this man was later interviewed in Bithynia in 111 by Pliny the Younger. According to Cassius Dio, Maximus distinguished himself during the campaigning of 102, and was rewarded for his services by a second consulship in 103, indicating his favour with emperor Trajan.

This imperial favour ended with the death of Trajan. According to the Augustan History, on the accession of emperor Hadrian in 117, Maximus was 'in exile on an island under suspicion of designs on the throne'. Nothing more is known of these suspected designs, but they prompted Hadrian's guard prefect Publius Acilius Attianus to recommend Maximus be put to death. The sequel is not known, but Hadrian was tiring of Attianus and it is more likely that Maximus was pardoned.

== Family ==
The identity of Maximus’ wife is unknown. His only known child was a daughter, Laberia Hostilia Crispina who, after his death, became the heiress to his fortune. Crispina became the second wife of Gaius Bruttius Praesens Lucius Fulvius Rusticus, consul in 139. They had a son, Lucius Fulvius Gaius Bruttius Praesens Laberius Maximus, twice consul. Maximus was the great-grandfather of Bruttia Crispina, who married the emperor Commodus.

Political offices
Preceded by P. Sallustius Blaesus; M. Peducaeus Saenianus as suffect consuls	Suffect consul of the Roman Empire; September–December 89 with Aulus Vicirius Proculus	Succeeded by Domitian XV; M. Cocceius Nerva II as ordinary consuls
Preceded by L. Antonius Albus; M. Junius Homullus	Consul of the Roman Empire; January–March 103 with Trajan V and Q. Glitius Atilius Agricola II	Succeeded by P. Metilius Nepos; Q. Baebius Macer
