= Publius Sallustius Blaesus =

Publius Sallustius Blaesus was a Roman senator active during the last half of the first century AD. He was suffect consul for the nundinium May to August 89 with Marcus Peducaeus Saenianus as his colleague. Despite his social rank, Blaesus is a shadowy figure about whom scholars have made numerous sumises.

The only fact of Blaesus' life that is certain is that he was a member of the Arval Brethren from at least as early as the year 78 to 91, when a gap in the records begins; when the records of the Arval Brethren resume in the year 101, he is no longer present. This has led some experts to conclude Blaesus died between the years 91 and 101.

Ronald Syme, noting the difficulty of polyonymous names, proposed identifying Blaesus with another consular senator, Sallustius Lucullus, the date of whose consulate is not known. According to Suetonius, Lucullus was executed by the emperor Domitian for allowing a new type of lance to be named after him. Syme further suggests that Sallustius Blaesus had a second gentilicium, "Velleius", allowing him to be identified with one Velleius Blaesus, the subject of a letter Pliny the Younger wrote to his friend Calvisius: Pliny's letter tells how Blaesus, a rich but dying ex-consul, was targeted by a legacy hunter, another senator named Marcus Aquilius Regulus. Both Statius and Martial also refer to a recently deceased Blaesus, the friend of their wealthy patron Atedius Melior. Edward Champlin supports Syme's identification by pointing to an inscription from Ephesus that mentions a "[.] Velleius P.? f. Tro.[...] L. Sertorius [... Ped]anius Fuscus Sa[linat]or Sallus[ti]us Bla[esus .] Julius Agricola [...] Caesonius", leading Champlin to suggest that "a new figure can emerge, the composite of three shadowy consulars who died in the latter years of the reign of Domitian, viz. P. Velleius P.f. Tro. Lucullus Sallustius Blaesus, cos. suff. 89."

However, P. Conole and Brian Jones point out since the records of the Arval Brethren "record his [Blaesus'] presence in Rome during every year of the first half of Domitian's reign for which complete minutes have survived, it is difficult to see how he could have managed to gain sufficient provincial experience in praetorian posts to merit appointment to Britain, an Imperial consular province." So while it is still possible Sallustius Blaesus is identical with the Velleius Blaesus of Pliny's anecdote, his identity with the poorly-documented governor of Britain is less likely.

Political offices
Preceded by Titus Aurelius Fulvus, and Marcus Asinius Atratinus as suffect consuls	Suffect consul of the Roman Empire; 89 with Marcus Peducaeus Saenianus	Succeeded by Aulus Vicirius Proculus, and Manius Laberius Maximus as suffect consuls
