= Bruttia Crispina =

Roman empress from 178 to 191

- Augusta
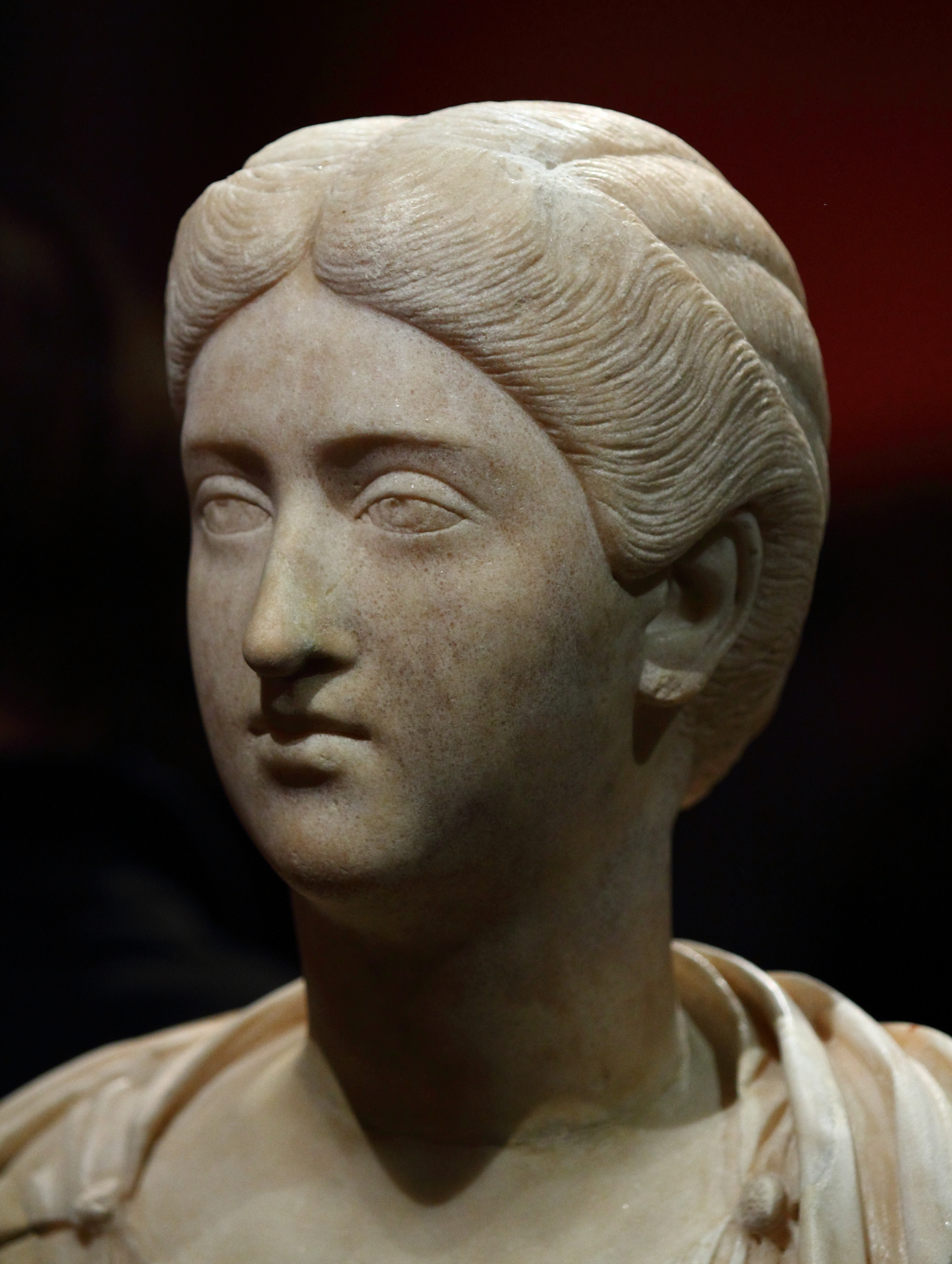
- Head of Bruttia Crispina, Roman Empress

Roman empress
- Tenure: 178 – 191
- Born: 164; Rome, Italy or Volceii, Italy
- Died: 191 (aged 26-27); Capri, Italy
- Spouse: Commodus
Names
- Bruttia Crispina
Regnal name
- Bruttia Crispina Augusta
- Dynasty: Nerva–Antonine
- Father: Gaius Bruttius Praesens
- Mother: Valeria

Bruttia Crispina (164 – 191 AD) was Roman empress from 178 to 191 as the consort of Roman emperor Commodus. Her marriage to Commodus did not produce an heir, and her husband was instead succeeded by Pertinax.

== Family ==
Crispina came from an illustrious aristocratic family and was the daughter of twice consul Gaius Bruttius Praesens and his wife Valeria. Crispina's paternal grandparents were consul and senator Gaius Bruttius Praesens and the rich heiress Laberia Hostilia Crispina, daughter of twice consul, Manius Laberius Maximus.

Crispina's brother was future consul Lucius Bruttius Quintius Crispinus. Her father's family originally came from Volceii, Lucania, Italy and were closely associated with the Roman emperors Trajan, Hadrian, Antoninus Pius and Marcus Aurelius.

== Empress ==
Crispina married the sixteen-year-old Commodus in the summer of 178 and brought him, as a dowry, a large number of estates. These, when added to the Imperial holdings, gave him control of a substantial part of Lucania. The actual ceremony was modest but was commemorated on coinage, and largesse was distributed to the people. An epithalamium for the occasion was composed by the sophist Julius Pollux.

Upon her marriage, Crispina received the title of Augusta, and thus became empress of the Roman Empire, as her husband was co-emperor with her father-in-law at the time. The previous empress and her mother-in-law, Faustina the Younger had died three years prior to her arrival.

Like most marriages of young members of the nobiles, it was arranged by patres—in Crispina's case by her father and her new father-in-law, the emperor Marcus Aurelius. Crispina is described as being a graceful person with a susceptible heart.

As Augusta, Crispina was extensively honoured with public images during the last two years of her father-in-law's reign and the initial years of her husband's reign. She did not seem to have any significant political influence over her husband during his reign. However, she was not exempted from court politics either, as her sister-in-law Lucilla, herself a former empress, was reportedly ambitious and jealous of the empress Crispina due to her position and power. Crispina may have been pregnant in 182, possibly motivating Lucilla to instigate a conspiracy against her brother. The theory is mainly based on coins of Crispina which display imagery associated with empresses who gave birth to children and was originated from by J. Aymard in his article "La conjuration de Lucilla". On the matter O.J. Hekster stated "Nothing is known of any children of the marriage, but the types of Diana Lucifera and Iuno Lucina clearly indicate hope, and Fecunditas, if rightly reported, should mean an actual birth". Neonatal death was so common at the time that omitting mention of them was the norm in ancient writing.

Crispina's marriage failed to produce an heir, which led to a dynastic succession crisis. In fact, both Lucius Antistius Burrus (with whom Commodus had shared his first consulate as sole ruler) and Gaius Arrius Antoninus, who were probably related to the imperial family, were allegedly put to death 'on the suspicion of pretending to the throne'.

After ten years of marriage, Crispina was falsely charged with adultery by her husband and was banished to the island of Capri in 188, where she was later executed. After her banishment, Commodus did not marry again but took on a mistress, a woman named Marcia, who was later said to have conspired in his murder.

== Death ==
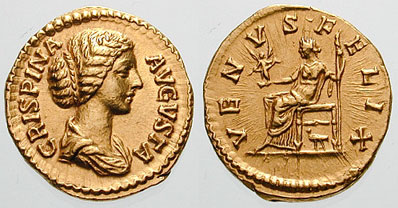
Empress Bruttia Crispina, draped bust

On the basis of a misreading of HA Commodus 5.9 and Cassius Dio's Roman History 73.4.6, her fall is sometimes wrongly associated with Lucilla's conspiracy to assassinate Commodus in 181 or 182. Her name continues to appear in inscriptions until as late as 191 (CIL VIII, 02366). Her eventual exile and death may instead have been a result of the fall of Marcus Aurelius Cleander, or of Commodus's inability to produce offspring with her to ensure the dynastic succession.

Royal titles
Preceded by Annia Galeria Faustina Minor	Empress of Rome; 178–188	Succeeded by Flavia Titiana
