= Gaius Bruttius Praesens (consul 153) =

2nd century Roman senator, imperial official and consul

Lucius Fulvius Gaius Bruttius Praesens Laberius Maximus (c. 119 – after 180 AD) was a Roman senator who held a number of imperial appointments during the reigns of emperors Antoninus Pius, Marcus Aurelius and Commodus, and was twice consul. Most of what we know about him comes from inscriptions.

Praesens was the son and (as far as is known) the only child of consul and senator Gaius Bruttius Praesens Lucius Fulvius Rusticus, by his second marriage to the wealthy heiress Laberia Hostilia Crispina. His mother was the daughter of Manius Laberius Maximus, a general who was also twice consul. Praesens was born and raised in Volceii, Lucania, Italy. To judge by the presumed dates of his first offices, he must have been born in or around the year 119. He served as a military tribune in Legio III Gallica in Syria, probably about 136 when his father was governing the province. At the beginning of Antoninus Pius' reign the family evidently stood in high favour: the father took his second consulship in 139 as colleague of the new emperor, and the son was elevated to patrician status about the same time. He went on to fill the coveted position of quaestor augusti to Antoninus.

His first consulship fell in 153: he was consul ordinarius, initiating the year with Aulus Junius Rufinus as his colleague. He continued to prosper under Marcus Aurelius: like his father, he was Proconsul of Africa, in 166–167. In 178, Marcus Aurelius' son, the future Emperor Commodus, was married to Praesens's daughter Bruttia Crispina and Marcus designated Praesens consul for the year 180. On 3 August 178, Praesens was one of those who accompanied Marcus and the young Commodus on the so-called 'expeditio Germanica secunda' against the Quadi, Iazyges and Marcomanni, and received military decorations for his part in the campaign. Praesens held the fasces again in 180, again as consul ordinarius, with Sextus Quintilius Condianus as his colleague.

According to the Chronograph of 354, Praesens owned a domus in Regio III of Rome.

Praesens had two children by an unknown woman: a son, the future consul Lucius Bruttius Quintius Crispinus, and a daughter, future Empress Bruttia Crispina.

== Sources ==
- https://web.archive.org/web/20070706043759/http://www.forumancientcoins.com/historia/coins/r3/r1361.htm
- https://www.livius.org/bn-bz/bruttius/crispina.html
- Various essays by Sir Ronald Syme, notably 'An Eccentric Patrician', in Roman Papers Volume III (Oxford, 1984).

Political offices
Preceded by P. Cluvius Maximus Paulinus; M. Servilius Silanus as suffect consuls	Consul of the Roman Empire; January–March 153 with Aulus Junius Rufinus	Succeeded by Sex. Caecilius Maximus; Marcus Pontius Sabinus as suffect consuls
Preceded by M'. Acilius Faustinus; L. Julius Proculianus as suffect consuls	Consul of the Roman Empire; 180 with Sextus Quintilius Condianus	Succeeded by Commodus III; L. Antistius Burrus
