= Fecunditas =

Roman goddess of fertility

In Roman mythology, Fecunditas (Latin: "fecundity, fertility") was the goddess of fertility. She was portrayed as a matron, sometimes holding a cornucopia or a hasta pura, with children in her arms or standing next to her.

Nero dedicated a temple at Rome to Fecunditas, on occasion of his daughter's birth in 63 AD.
