= Tribunus laticlavius =

Military-political office in ancient Rome

In the Roman army of the late Republic and the Principate, the tribunus laticlavius ("broad-striped tribune") was one of the six military tribunes in a legion. Usually, it consisted of young men around age 20 who belonged to a wealthy family or were friends with the legate. The position of tribunus laticlavius was the first step on the Cursus honorum. Tribunus laticlavius are typically depicted wearing a purple cloak.

== Overview ==
The tribunus laticlavius were second in command to the legatus legionis, the legion's commander. They were also above the other five tribuni angusticlavii and later the praefectus castrorum. It was common for the tribunus laticlavius to be a Roman noble younger than 25 years old, usually around the age of 20. They were commonly either part of the richest families in Rome or a close friend to the legionary commander. It was also common for the tribune to have no previous military experience.

Members of the tribunus laticlavius were part of the senatorial aristocracy. It was common for the tribune to return to Rome and run for a political office, usually a quaestorship after two or three years as a tribune. The position was the first step of the traditional cursus honorum. By the middle of 250s AD, at the earliest, the post of the tribunus laticlavius had disappeared from the Roman army, following the general trend of removal of the senatorial class from military commands.

== See also ==
- Centurion
- Decanus
- Legatus
- List of Roman army unit types
- Praefectus castrorum
- Primus Pilus
- Tribune
