= Roman legion =

Largest military unit of the Roman army

The Roman Empire under Hadrian (r. 117–138), showing the legions deployed in its senatorial provinces

The Roman legion (Latin: legiō, Latin: [ˈɫɛɡioː]) was the largest military unit of the Roman army, composed of Roman citizens serving as legionaries. During the Roman Republic the manipular legion comprised 4,200 infantry and 300 cavalry. In late Republican times the legions were formed of 5,200 men and were restructured around 10 cohorts, the first cohort being double strength. This structure persisted throughout the Principate and middle Empire, before further changes in the fourth century resulted in new formations of around 1,000 men.

== Size ==
The size of a typical legion varied throughout the history of ancient Rome, with complements ranging from 4,200 legionaries and 300 equites (drawn from the wealthier classes – in early Rome all troops provided their own equipment) in the Republic, to 5,500 in the Imperial period, when most legions were led by a Roman Imperial Legate.

A legion had 4,800 legionaries (in 10 cohorts of 6 centuries of 80 legionaries) from the late republic to the time of Julius Caesar. It expanded to 5,280 men plus 120 auxiliaries in the Imperial period (split into 10 cohorts, nine of 480 men each, with the first cohort being almost double-strength at 800 men). These are typical field strengths while "paper strength" was slightly higher (e.g. 600 and 1,200 respectively for Imperial cohorts).

In the early Roman Kingdom the term legion may have meant the entire Roman army, but sources on this period are few and unreliable. The subsequent organisation of legions varied greatly over time but legions were typically composed of around five thousand soldiers. During much of the republican era, a legion was divided into three lines, each of ten maniples. In the late Republic and much of the imperial period (from about 100 BC), a legion was divided into ten cohorts, each of six (or five) centuries. Legions also included a small ala, or cavalry unit. By the third century AD, the legion was a much smaller unit of about 1,000 to 1,500 men, and there were more of them. In the fourth century AD, East Roman border guard legions (limitanei) may have become even smaller. In terms of organization and function, the republican era legion may have been influenced by the ancient Greek and Macedonian phalanx.

== Function and constitution ==
For most of the Roman Imperial period, the legions formed the Roman army's elite heavy infantry, recruited exclusively from Roman citizens, while the remainder of the army consisted of auxiliaries, who provided additional infantry and the vast majority of the Roman cavalry (provincials who aspired to Roman citizenship gained it when honourably discharged from the auxiliaries). The Roman army, for most of the Imperial period, consisted mostly of auxiliaries rather than legions.

== Longevity ==
Many of the legions founded before 40 BC were still active until at least the fifth century, notably Legio V Macedonica, which was founded by Augustus in 43 BC and was in Egypt in the seventh century during the Islamic conquest of Egypt.

On the other hand, Legio XVII ("Seventeenth Legion"), Legio XVIII ("Eighteenth Legion") and Legio XIX ("Nineteenth Legion"), founded by Augustus around 41 BC, were destroyed by a Germanic alliance led by Arminius in the Varian Disaster (September 9, AD 9) and never raised again by the Romans thereafter.

Quintili Vare, legiones redde! (Quintilius Varus, give me back my legions!)

== Evolution ==
Almost nothing is known about the legion of the Roman Kingdom period that could have included 1000 men from each of the three original Roman tribes. The earliest surviving detailed description comes from Polybius, who was writing c. 150 BC and his account most likely was influenced by the organization of the Roman army after the defeat of Hannibal in the Punic wars some 50 years earlier.

The legions of the Republic were only conscripted in times of conflict and usually limited to four legions, two to be commanded by each consul, though more could be levied if needed. Legionaries lacked the opportunity of a military career; they were not paid well, their primary form of income being what they could loot from the battlefield, and were simply called upon when needed and returned to their civilian lives when they were no longer required.

In terms of organization and function, the early Republican era military was inherited from the Etruscans and seemingly influenced by the ancient Greek and Macedonian phalanx.

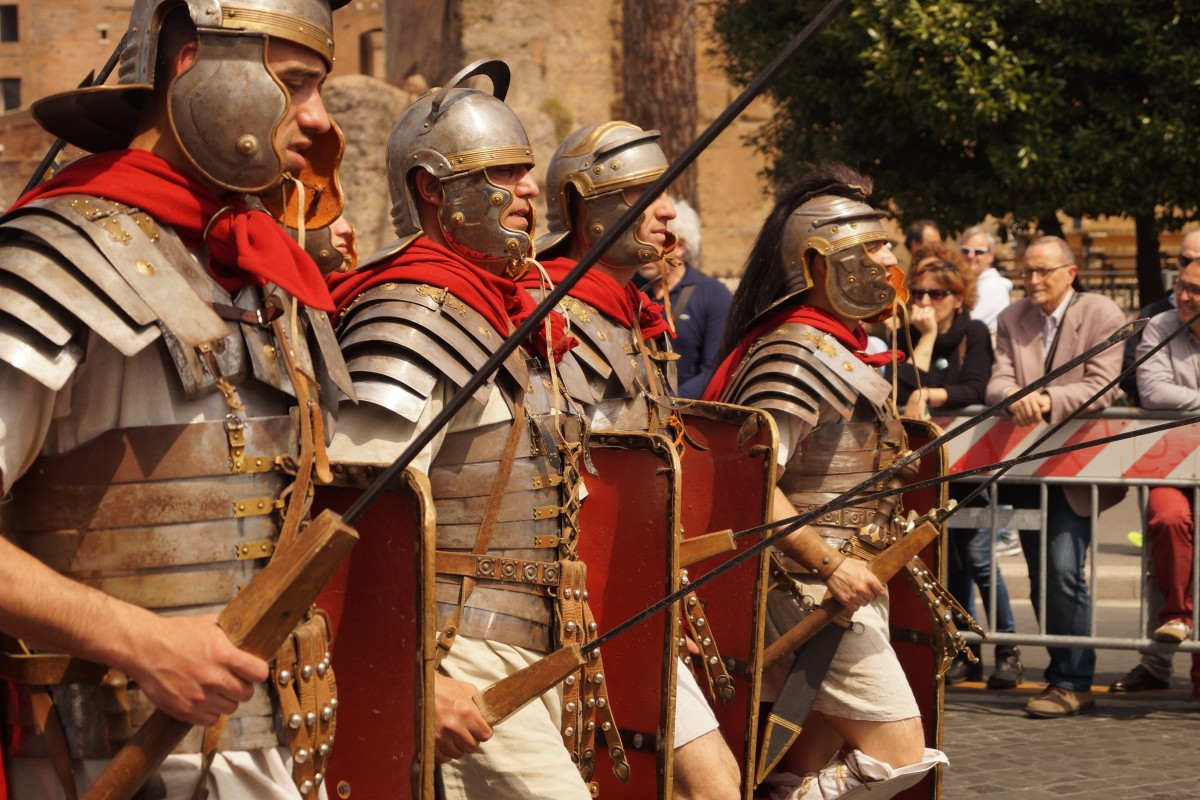
Depiction of Roman legionaries

After a crushing defeat at the Battle of the Allia, in 387 BC the military structure was reformed. Under the Camillan system the legions were initially structured based on social class, with the poorest being the first line of the formation. The legionaries most often fought with hastae (spears) and scuta (large rectangular shields) in a checkered maniple formation with assistance from skirmishers. The exception to this was the triarii, the final line of the formation who instead fought as hoplites, using Greek clipei and whose wealth could afford them gladii in the case of a broken spear.

By the 3rd century BC, this system was seen to be inefficient. Under the new Polybian system the ranks were no longer structured by wealth, and instead by age and experience. All legionaries had their hastae replaced by gladii, along with two pila, which were used as an opening volley before melee. The former classes of poor legionaries, the accensi, rorarii, and leves were replaced by the velites. Unit sizes were also expanded.

Non-citizens or peregrini were also offered a position in the military as auxiliaries.

The Roman legion evolved from 3,000 men in the Roman Republic to over 5,200 men in the Roman Empire, consisting of centuries as the basic units. Until the middle of the first century AD, ten cohorts made up a Roman legion. This was later changed to nine cohorts of standard size (with six centuries at 80 men each) with the first cohort being of double strength (five double-strength centuries with 160 men each).

By the fourth century AD, the legion was a much smaller unit of about 1,000 to 1,500 men, and there were more of them. This had come about as the large formation legion and auxiliary unit, 10,000 men, was broken down into smaller units – originally temporary detachments – to cover more territory.

In the fourth century AD, East Roman border guard legions (limitanei) may have become even smaller.

== History ==
=== Roman Kingdom (c. 752 to 509 BC) ===
In the period before the raising of the legio and the early years of the Roman Kingdom and the Roman Republic, forces are described as being organised into centuriae of roughly one hundred men. These centuries were grouped together as required and answered to the leader who had hired or raised them. Such independent organisation persisted until the 2nd century BC amongst light infantry and cavalry, but was discarded completely in later periods with the supporting role taken instead by allied troops. The roles of century leader (later formalised as a centurion), second in command and standard bearer are referenced in this early period.

Rome's early period is undocumented and shrouded in myths, but those myths tell that during the rule of Servius Tullius, the census (from Latin: censeō – accounting of the people) was introduced. With this all Roman able-bodied, property-owning male citizens were divided into five classes for military service based on their wealth and then organised into centuries as sub-units of the greater Roman army or legio (multitude). Joining the army was both a duty and a distinguishing mark of Roman citizenship; the wealthiest land owners performed the most years of military service. These individuals would have had the most to lose should the state have fallen.

=== Mid Republic (509–107 BC) ===
At some point after the overthrow of the Roman monarchy the legio was subdivided into two separate legions, each one ascribed to one of the two consuls. In the first years of the Republic, when warfare was mostly concentrated on raiding, it is uncertain if the full manpower of the legions was summoned at any one time. In 494 BC, when three foreign threats emerged, the dictator Manius Valerius Maximus raised ten legions which Livy says was a greater number than had been raised previously at any one time.

Also, some warfare was still conducted by Roman forces outside the legionary structure, the most famous example being the campaign in 479 BC by the clan army of gens Fabia against the Etruscan city of Veii (in which the clan was annihilated). Legions became more formally organised in the 4th century BC, as Roman warfare evolved to more frequent and planned operations, and the consular army was raised to two legions each.

In the Republic, legions had an ephemeral existence. Except for Legio I to IV, which were the consular armies (two per consul), other units were levied by campaign. Rome's Italian allies were required to provide approximately ten cohorts (auxilia were not organised into legions) to support each Roman Legion.

In the middle of the Republic, legions were composed of the following units:

- Equites (cavalry): the cavalry was originally the most prestigious unit, where wealthy young Roman men displayed their skill and prowess, laying the foundation for an eventual political career. Cavalry equipment was purchased by each of the cavalrymen and consisted of a round shield, helmet, body armour, sword and one or more lances. The cavalry was outnumbered in the legion. In a total of c. 3,000 men (plus the velites that normally enlarged the number to about 4,200), the legion only had around 300 horsemen, divided into ten units (turmae) of 30 men. These men were commanded by decurions. In addition to heavy cavalry, there would be the light cavalry levied from poor citizens and wealthy young citizens not old enough to be in the hastati or the equites. In battle, they were used to disrupt and outflank enemy infantry formations and to fight off enemy cavalry. In the latter type of engagement, they would often (though not always) dismount some or all of the horsemen to fight a stationary battle on foot, an unusual tactic for the time, but one that offered significant advantages in stability and agility in a time before stirrups.
- Velites (light infantry): these were mainly poorer citizens who could not afford to equip themselves properly. Their primary function was to act as skirmishers – javelin-throwers, who would engage the enemy early in order either to harass them or to cover the movement of troops behind them. After throwing their javelins, they would retreat through the gaps between the maniples, screened from the attack of the enemy by the heavy infantry lines. With the shortage of cavalry in the army of the early to mid Republican army, the velites were also used as scouts. They did not have a precise formal organisation or formation.
- Heavy infantry: this was the principal unit of the legion. The heavy infantry was composed of citizen legionaries that could afford the equipment composed of a bronze helmet, shield, sword, armour and pilum, a heavy javelin whose range was about 30 metres. After the Second Punic War, the preferred weapon for the hastati and principes was the gladius, a short sword. Their hobnailed sandals (caligae) were also an effective weapon against a fallen enemy. Heavy infantry was subdivided, according to experience, into three separate lines of troops:
  - The hastati (sing.: hastatus): these consisted of raw or inexperienced soldiers, considered to be less reliable than legionaries of several years' service. The Hastati were placed at the front for several reasons. One reason is the city of Rome could ill-afford to lose experienced soldiers, so they put the greenest soldiers at the front. If they survived, the hastati would gain invaluable experience. Another reason is if the newest soldiers succumbed to battle nerves and broke and tried to run, then there were experienced soldiers behind them to stiffen their resolve.
  - The principes (sing.: princeps): these were the more experienced soldiers, often better equipped than the hastati, and having more experience on the battlefield, they would take up the second line in the battle in the event the Hastati failed or fled. They were the second wave in an early Republican Legion.
  - The triarii (sing.: triarius): these were the veteran soldiers, to be used in battle only in extreme situations; they rested one knee down when not engaged in combat. The triarii served primarily as reserves or barrier troops designed to backstop the hastati and principes, and were equipped with long hastae (spears) rather than the pilum and gladius (the hastati and principes stopped using spears in 387 BC). Thus armed, they fought in a phalanx formation. The sight of an advancing armored formation of triarii legionaries frequently discouraged exultant enemies in pursuit of retreating hastati and principes troops. Ad triarios redisse – To fall back upon the triarii – was a Roman idiom meaning to use one's last resort.

Each of these three lines was subdivided into (usually ten) chief tactical units called maniples. A maniple consisted of two centuries and was commanded by the senior of the two centurions. At this time, each century of hastati and principes consisted of 60 men; a century of triarii was 30 men. These 3,000 men (twenty maniples of 120 men, and ten maniples of 60 men), together with about 1,200 velites and 300 cavalry gave the mid Republican ("manipular") legion a nominal strength of about 4,500 men.

=== Late Republic (107–27 BC) ===
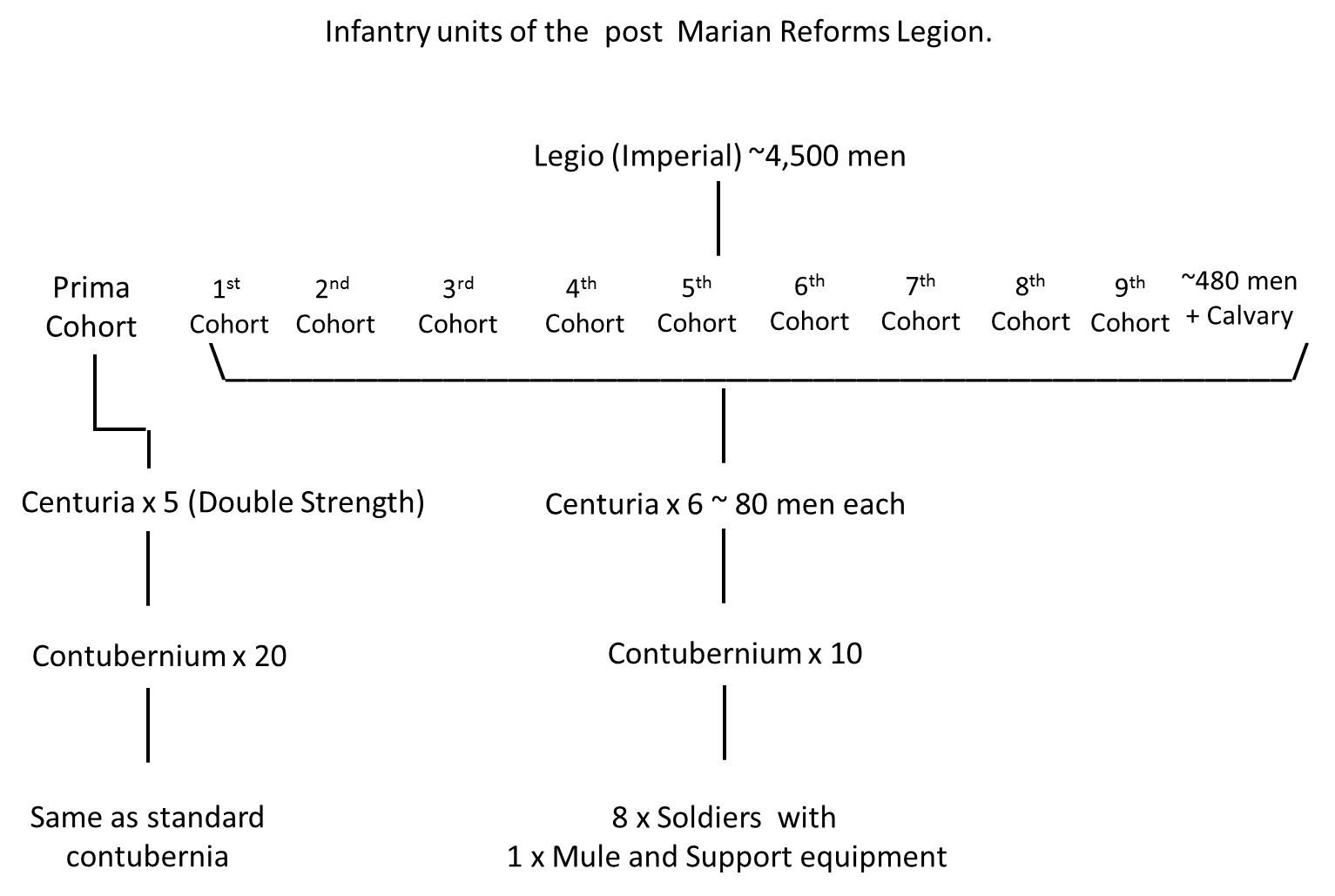
Visual representation of the legion showing size and disposition for Infantry formations

Each century had its own standard and was made up of ten units (contubernia) of eight men who shared a tent, a millstone, a mule and cooking pot.

Full Roman citizenship was open to all the regions of Italy. At the same time, the three different types of heavy infantry were replaced by a single, standard type based on the principes: armed with two heavy javelins called pila (singular pilum), the short sword called gladius, chain mail (lorica hamata), helmet and rectangular shield (scutum).

The role of allied legions would eventually be taken up by contingents of allied auxiliary troops, called auxilia. Auxilia contained immunes (specialist units), engineers and pioneers, artillerymen and craftsmen, service and support personnel and irregular units made up of non-citizens, mercenaries and local militia. These were usually formed into complete units such as light cavalry, light infantry or velites, and labourers. There was also a reconnaissance squad of ten or more light mounted infantry called speculatores, who could also serve as messengers or even as an early form of military intelligence service.

A typical legion of this period had 5,120 legionaries as well as a large number of camp followers, servants and slaves. Legions could contain as many as 11,000 fighting men when including the auxiliaries. During the Later Roman Empire, the legion was reduced in size to 1,000 to allow for easier provisioning and to expand the regions under surveillance. Numbers would also vary depending on casualties suffered during a campaign; Julius Caesar's legions during his campaign in Gaul often only had around 3,500 men.

Tactics were not very different from the past, but their effectiveness was largely improved because of the professional training of the soldiers.

Throughout the history of Rome's Late Republic, the legions played an important political role. By the 1st century BC, the threat of the legions under a demagogue was recognised. Roman governors were not allowed to leave their provinces with their legions. When Julius Caesar broke this rule, leaving his province of Gaul and crossing the Rubicon into Italy, he precipitated a constitutional crisis. This crisis and the civil wars which followed brought an end to the Republic and led to the foundation of the Empire under Augustus in 27 BC.

=== Early Empire (27 BC–AD 284) ===
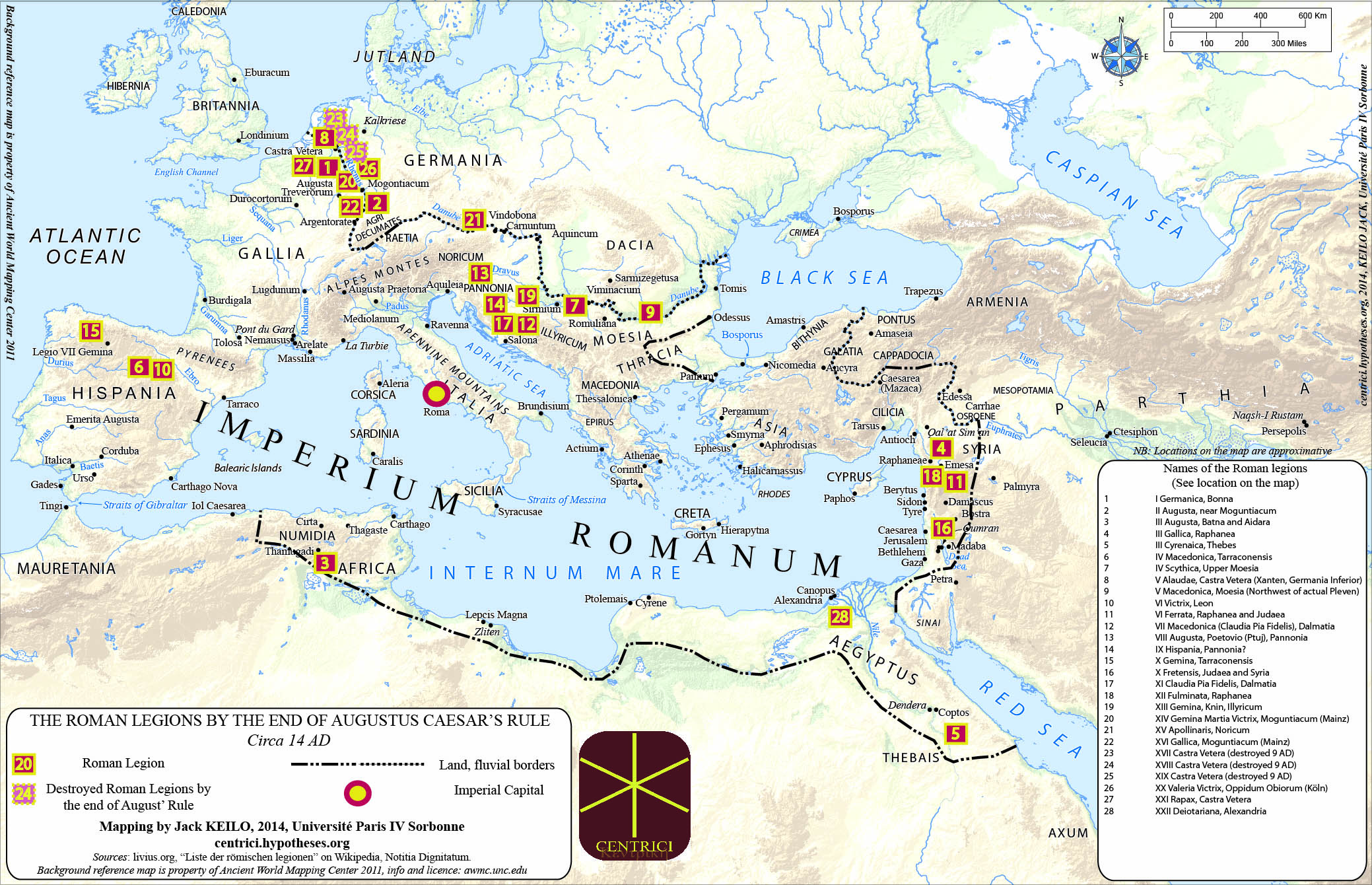
Map of Roman legions by 14 AD

Roman Empire and legions in 125 AD near its maximum extent

Generals, during the recent Republican civil wars, had formed their own legions and numbered them as they wished. During this time, there was a high incidence of Gemina (twin) legions, where two legions were consolidated into a single organisation (and was later made official and put under a legatus and six duces). At the end of the civil war against Mark Antony, Augustus was left with around fifty legions, with several double counts (multiple Legio Xs for instance). For political and economic reasons, Augustus reduced the number of legions to 28 (which shrank to 25 after the Battle of the Teutoburg Forest, in which three legions were completely destroyed).

Beside streamlining the army, Augustus also regulated the soldiers' pay. At the same time, he greatly increased the number of auxiliaries to the point where they were equal in number to the legionaries. He also created the Praetorian Guard along with a permanent Roman navy where served the liberti, or freed slaves. The legions also became permanent at this time, and not recruited for particular campaigns. They were also allocated to static bases with permanent castra legionaria (legionary fortresses).

Augustus' military policies proved sound and cost effective, and were generally followed by his successors. These emperors would carefully add new legions, as circumstances required or permitted, until the strength of the standing army stood at around 30 legions (hence the wry remark of the philosopher Favorinus that It is ill arguing with the master of 30 legions). With each legion having 5,120 legionaries usually supported by an equal number of auxiliary troops (according to Tacitus), the total force available to a legion commander during the Pax Romana probably ranged from 11,000 downwards, with the more prestigious legions and those stationed on hostile borders or in restive provinces tending to have more auxiliaries. By the time of the emperor Severus, 193–211, the auxiliaries may have composed 55 to 60% of the army, 250,000 of 447,000. Some legions may have even been reinforced at times with units making the associated force near 15,000–16,000 or about the size of a modern division.

Throughout the Imperial era, the legions played an important political role. Their actions could secure the empire for a usurper or take it away. For example, the defeat of Vitellius in the Year of the Four Emperors was decided when the Danubian legions chose to support Vespasian.

In the Empire, the legion was standardised, with symbols and an individual history where men were proud to serve. The legion was commanded by a legatus or legate. Aged around thirty, he would usually be a senator on a three-year appointment. Immediately subordinate to the legate would be six elected military tribunes – five would be staff officers and the remaining one would be a noble heading for the Senate (originally this tribune commanded the legion). There would also be a group of officers for the medical staff, the engineers, record-keepers, the praefectus castrorum (commander of the camp) and other specialists such as priests and musicians.

=== Later Empire (from 284 AD) ===
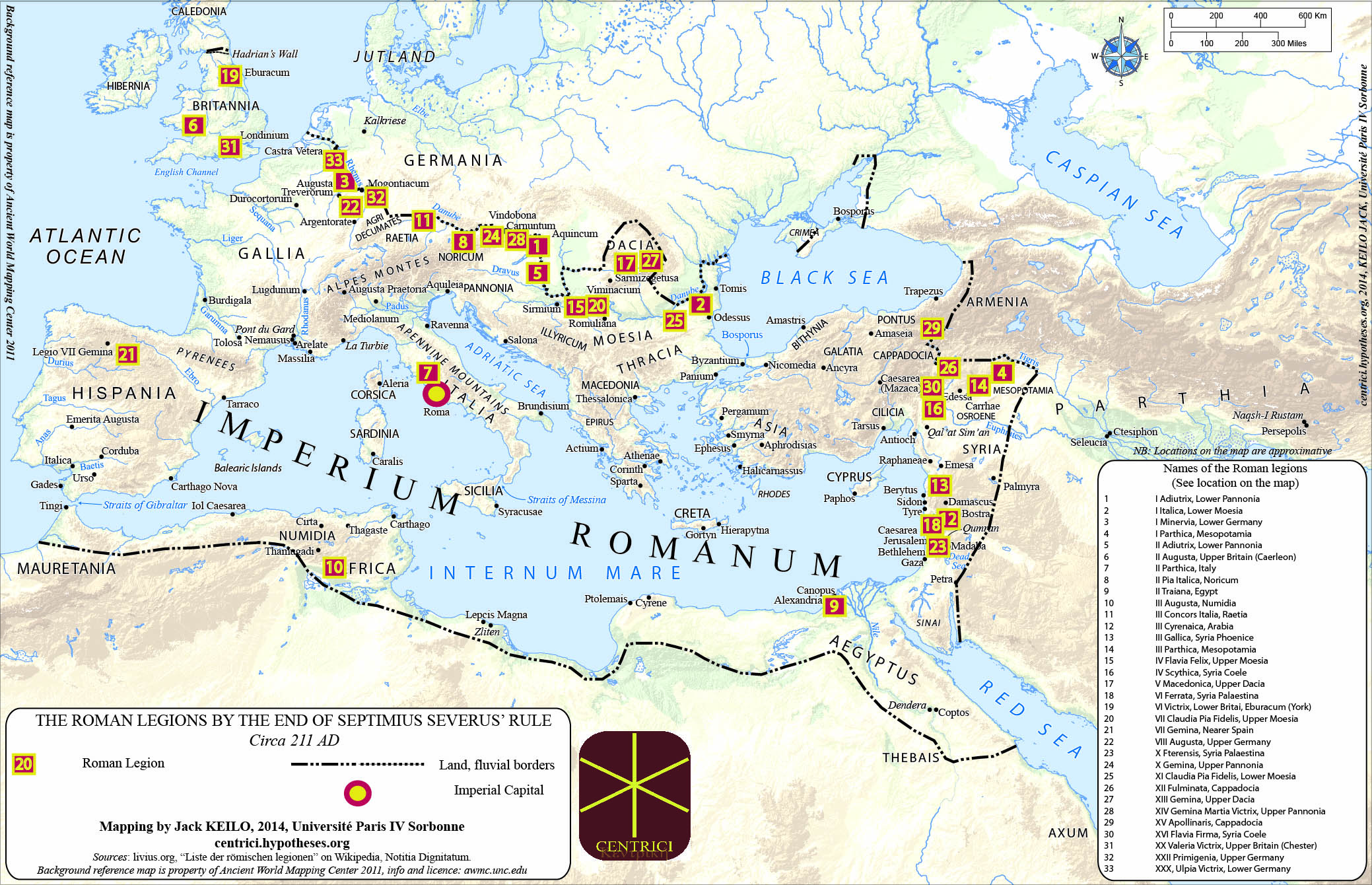
Map of Roman legions by 212 AD

In the Later Roman Empire, the number of legions was increased and the Roman army expanded. There is no evidence to suggest that legions changed in form before the Tetrarchy, although there is evidence that they were smaller than the paper strengths usually quoted. The final form of the legion originated with the elite legiones palatinae created by Diocletian and the Tetrarchs. These were infantry units of around 1,000 men rather than the 5,000, including cavalry, of the old legions. The earliest legiones palatinae were the Lanciarii, Joviani, Herculiani and Divitenses.

The 4th century saw a very large number of new, small legions created, a process which began under Constantine II. In addition to the elite palatini, other legions called comitatenses and pseudocomitatenses, along with the auxilia palatina, provided the infantry of late Roman armies. The Notitia Dignitatum lists 25 legiones palatinae, 70 legiones comitatenses, 47 legiones pseudocomitatenses and 111 auxilia palatina in the field armies, and a further 47 legiones in the frontier armies. Legion names such as Honoriani and Gratianenses found in the Notitia suggest that the process of creating new legions continued through the 4th century rather than being a single event. The names also suggest that many new legions were formed from vexillationes or from old legions. In addition, there were 24 vexillationes palatini, 73 vexillationes comitatenses; 305 other units in the Eastern limitanei and 181 in the Western limitanei. A rare instance of apparent direct continuity between the legions of the early Empire and those of the post-6th century army was Legion V Macedonica; created in 43 BC, recorded in the Notitia Dignitatum as a legione comitatense under the title of Quinta Macedonica and surviving in Egypt until the Arab conquest of 637 AD.

According to the late Roman writer Vegetius' De re militari, each century had a ballista and each cohort had an onager, giving the legion a formidable siege train of 59 ballistae and 10 onagers, each manned by 10 libritors (artillerymen) and mounted on wagons drawn by oxen or mules. In addition to attacking cities and fortifications, these would be used to help defend Roman forts and fortified camps (castra) as well. They would even be employed on occasion, especially in the later Empire, as field artillery during battles or in support of river crossings.

Despite a number of organisational changes, the legion system survived the fall of the Western Roman Empire. It was continued within the Eastern Roman Empire until the 7th century, when reforms begun by Emperor Heraclius to supply the increasing need for soldiers resulted in the Theme system. Despite this, the Eastern Roman armies continued to be influenced by the earlier Roman legions, and were maintained with similar levels of discipline, strategic prowess, and organization.

== Legionary ranks ==
Aside from the rank and file legionary (who received the base wage of 10 assēs a day or 225 denarii a year), the following list describes the system of officers which developed within the legions from the late republic (100s BC) until the military reforms of Diocletian (c. 290).

=== Senior officers ===
- Legatus Augusti pro praetore (imperial legate): the commander of two or more legions. The imperial legate also served as the governor of the province in which the legions he commanded were stationed. Of senatorial rank, the imperial legate was appointed by the emperor and usually held command for 3 or 5 years.
- Legatus legionis (legionary legate): the overall commander of the legion. The post was usually filled by a senator, appointed by the emperor, who held command for 3 or 4 years, although he could serve for a much longer period. In a Roman province with only one legion, the legatus was also the provincial governor. In such circumstances, the legatus was dual-hatted as both legionary legate and imperial legate. The legionary legate also served as commander of the auxiliary units attached to the legion, though they were not formally a part of the legion's command structure.
- Tribunus laticlavius (broad-band tribune): named for the broad-striped tunic worn by men of senatorial rank, this tribune was appointed by the emperor or the senate. Though generally young, he was more experienced than the tribuni angusticlavii. He served as second-in-command of the legion, behind the legate. Because of his age and inexperience, he was not the actual second-in-command in battle, but he would take command of the legion if the legate died.
- Praefectus castrorum (camp prefect): the camp prefect was third in command of the legion. Generally, he was a long-serving veteran from a lower social status than the tribunii whom he outranked, and who previously had served as primus pilus and finished his 25 years with the legions. He was used as a senior officer in charge of training a legion, though he could also command a cohort of auxiliaries.
- Tribuni angusticlavii (narrow-band tribunes): each legion had five lower-ranking tribunes, who were normally from the equestrian class and had at least some years of prior military experience. They often served the role of administrative officers. This tribunate was often a first, but optional, step in a young man's political career (see cursus honorum).

=== Centurions ===
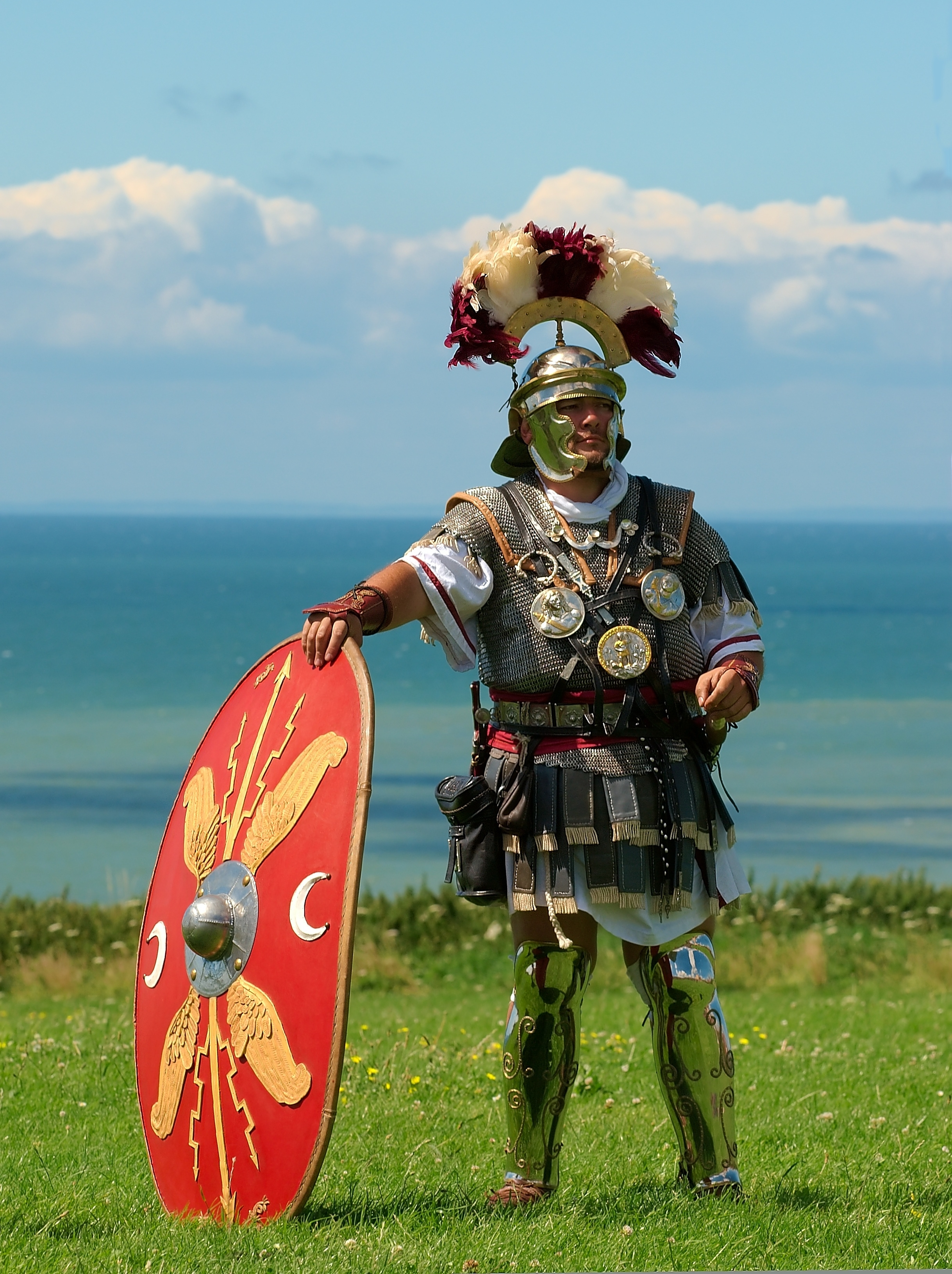
A historical reenactor in Roman centurion costume

The rank of centurion was an officer grade that held much responsibility. The most senior centurion in a legion was known as the primus pilus (lit. "first spear"), who directly commanded the first century of the first cohort and commanded the whole first cohort when in battle. Within the second to tenth cohorts, the commander of each cohort's first century was known as a pilus prior and was in command of his entire cohort when in battle. The seniority of the pilus prior centurions was followed by the five other century commanders of the first cohort, who were known as a primi ordines.

There is a story of one centurion, Petronius Fortunatus, making rank in four years, then spending the next forty-two years in twelve different legions never once serving in the primi ordines.

The six centuries of a normal cohort, were, in order of precedence:

- The rear triarii (rear third line)
- The forward triarii (forward third line)
- The rear principes (rear principal line)
- The forward principes (forward principal line)
- The rear hastati (rear spears)
- The forward hastati (forward spears)

The centuries took their titles from the old use of the legion drawn up in three lines of battle using three classes of soldier (each century would then hold a cross-section of this theoretical line, although these century titles were now essentially nominal). Each of the three lines is then sub-divided within the century into a more forward and a more rear century.

- Primus pilus: the primus pilus was the commanding centurion of the first century, first cohort and the senior-most centurion of the entire legion. (Unlike other cohorts, the first cohort had only one javelin century, instead of a "front spear" and a "back spear" century.) The primus pilus had a chance of later becoming a praefectus castrorum. When the primus pilus retired, he would most likely gain entry into the equestrian class. He was paid 60 times the base wage. Primus pilus were also paid more than an average centurion and like a narrowband tribune.
- Pilus prior: the "front file" centurions were the commanders of the 10 1st centuries within the legion, making them senior centurions of their respective cohorts. While the legion was in battle formation, the pilus prior was given command of their entire cohort. The primus pilus was also a pilus prior, and the most senior of all the centurions within the legion. These positions were usually held by experienced veteran soldiers who had been moved up within the ranks. This rank is subordinate to the primus pilus.
- Primi ordines: the "ranks of the first [cohort]" were the five centurions of the first cohort, and included the primus pilus. They, excluding the primus pilus, were paid 30 times the base wage. This rank is senior to all other centurions, save the primus pilus and pilus prior.
- Other centurions: each legion had 59 or 60 centurions, one to command each century of the ten cohorts. They were the backbone of the professional army and were the career soldiers who ran the day-to-day life of the soldiers and issued commands in the field. They were generally moved up from the ranks, but in some cases could be direct appointments from the emperor or other higher-ranking officials. The cohorts were ranked from the first to the tenth and the century within each cohort ranked from 1 to 6, with only five centuries in the first cohort (for a total of 59 centurions and the primus pilus). The century that each centurion commanded was a direct reflection of his rank: command of the 1st century of the first cohort was the highest, and the 6th century of the 10th cohort was the lowest. Paid ten times the basic wage.

=== Legionaries ===
The Roman army maintained a complex position and grading system for its soldiers that reflected the many and varied duties of the Roman army. There were three pay grades within the rank of legionary: standard, one and a half, and twice the basic pay rate.

=== Standard duty positions ===
- Optio: one for each centurion (59–60), they were appointed by the centurion from within the ranks to act as his second in command and were graded pay twice the basic wage.
- Tesserarius (guard commander): one for each century. They acted as seconds to the optios and were graded pay one and a half times the basic wage. Keeper of the watchword, administrative assistant to HQ Staff, third in command of a century. These men fought as normal soldiers when the century they were attached to was not in the vanguard.
- Decurion: commanded a cavalry unit (turma) of 10 to 30 eques legionis.
- Decanus: commanded a contubernium or ten men tent party, eight soldiers and two non-combatants. A group of four soldiers would be referred to as a quaternion.

=== Special duty positions ===
- Aquilifer: a single position within the legion. The aquilifer was the legion's standard – or aquila (eagle) – bearer and was an enormously important and prestigious position. Losing the aquila was considered the greatest dishonor a legion could endure. This post therefore had to be filled with steady veteran soldiers, with an excellent understanding of the tactics of the legion. He was graded pay twice the basic wage.
- Signifer: each century had a signifer (thus, there were 59 in a legion) and within each cohort the 1st century's signifer would be the senior. He was standard-bearer for the centurial signum, a spear shaft decorated with medallions and topped with an open hand to signify loyalty, which was a rallying point for the soldiers. In addition to carrying the signum, the signifer also assumed responsibility for the financial administration of the unit and functioned as the legionaries' banker. He was graded pay twice the basic wage.
- Cornicen ("horn blower"): worked hand in hand with the signifer drawing the attention of the men to the centurial signum and issuing the audible commands of the officers. He was graded pay twice the basic wage.
- Imaginifer: a special position from the time of Augustus onwards. Carried the standard bearing the image of the Emperor as a constant reminder of the troops' loyalty to him. He was graded pay twice the basic wage.
- Immunes: immunes were legionary soldiers who possessed specialised skills, qualifying them for better pay and excusing them from labour and guard work. Engineers, artillerymen, musicians, clerks, quartermasters, drill and weapons instructors, carpenters, hunters, medical staff and military police were all immune soldiers. These men were still fully trained legionaries, however, and were called upon to serve in the battle lines when needed.
- Evocatus: a veteran of the Roman army who had earned his military diploma for military service, but had chosen to re-enlist. They received double pay and were excluded from regular duties, such as manual labour.

== Pay ==
Legionaries received 225 denarii a year (equal to 900 sestertii) until Domitian, who increased it to 300 denarii. In spite of the steady inflation during the 2nd century, there was no further rise until the time of Septimius Severus, who increased it to 500 denarii a year. However, the soldiers did not receive all the money in cash, as the state deducted a clothing and food tax from their pay. To this wage, a legionary on active campaign would hope to add the booty of war, from the bodies of their enemies and as plunder from enemy settlements. Slaves could also be claimed from the prisoners of war and divided amongst the legion for later sale, which would bring in a sizeable supplement to their regular pay.

All legionary soldiers would also receive a praemia (veterans' benefits) on completion of their term of service of 25 years or more: a sizeable sum of money (3,000 denarii from the time of Augustus) and/or a plot of good farmland (good land was in much demand); farmland given to veterans often helped in establishing control of the frontier regions and over rebellious provinces. Later, under Caracalla, the praemia increased to 5,000 denarii.

=== Pay scales ===
- Caligati: a pay grade receiving standard pay
- Sesquiplicarii: a pay grade receiving one and a half standard pay
- Duplicarius: a pay grade receiving double the standard pay.

== Symbols ==
From 104 BC onwards, each legion used an aquila (eagle) as its standard symbol. The symbol was carried by an officer known as aquilifer, and its loss was considered to be a very serious embarrassment, and often led to the disbanding of the legion itself. Normally, this was because any legion incapable of regaining its eagle in battle was so severely mauled that it was no longer effective in combat.

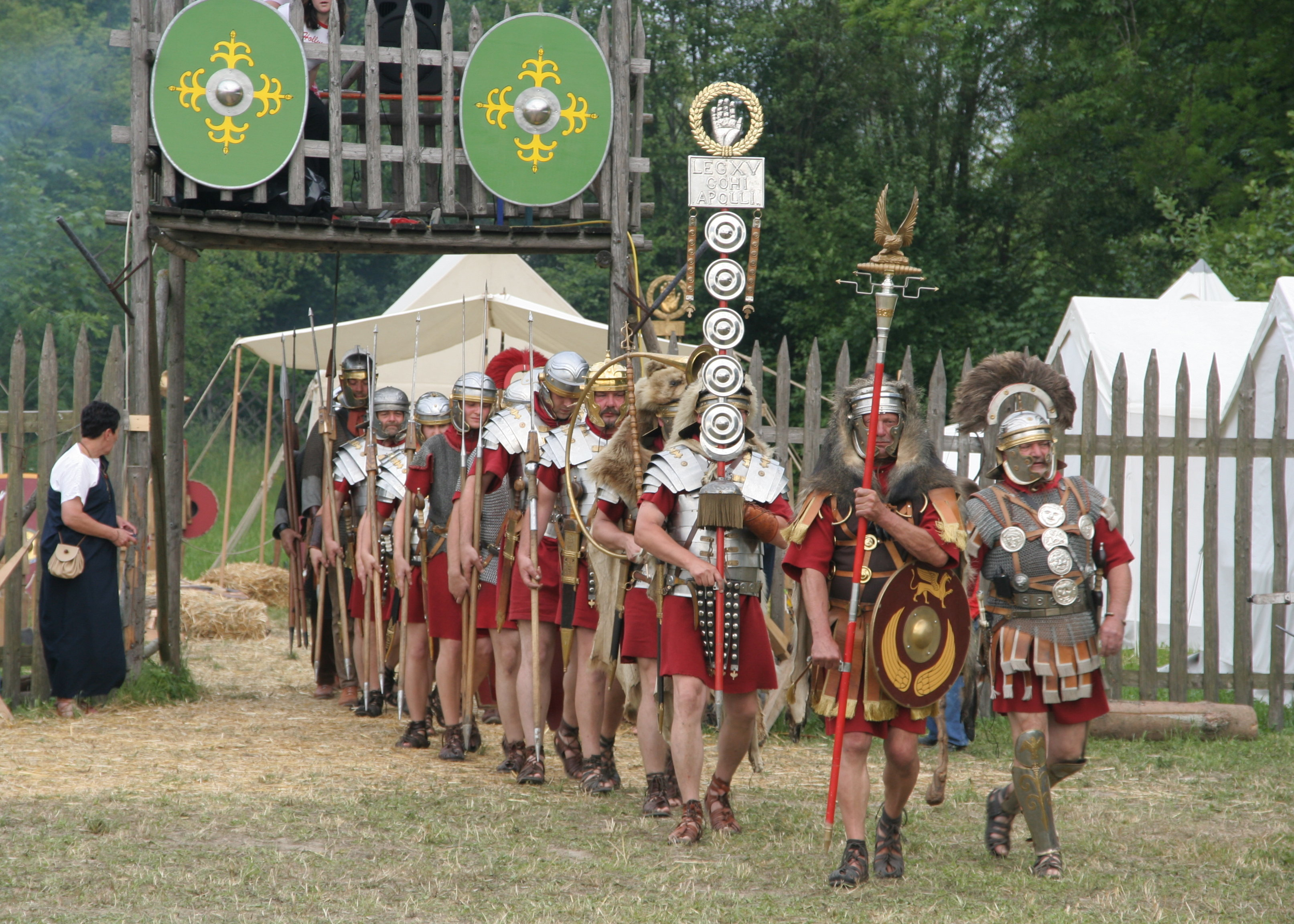
Reenacters portraying Roman legionaries of Legio XV Apollinaris

In Gallic War (Bk IV, Para. 25), Julius Caesar describes an incident at the start of his first invasion of Britain in 55 BC that illustrated how fear for the safety of the eagle could drive Roman soldiers. When Caesar's troops hesitated to leave their ships for fear of the Britons, the aquilifer of the tenth legion threw himself overboard and, carrying the eagle, advanced alone against the enemy. His comrades, fearing disgrace, 'with one accord, leapt down from the ship' and were followed by troops from the other ships.

With the birth of the Roman Empire, the legions created a bond with their leader, the emperor himself. Each legion had another officer, called imaginifer, whose role was to carry a pike with the imago (image, sculpture) of the emperor as pontifex maximus.

Each legion, furthermore, had a vexillifer who carried a vexillum or signum, with the legion name and emblem depicted on it, unique to the legion. It was common for a legion to detach some sub-units from the main camp to strengthen other corps. In these cases, the detached subunits carried only the vexillum, and not the aquila, and were called, therefore, vexillationes. A miniature vexillum, mounted on a silver base, was sometimes awarded to officers as a recognition of their service upon retirement or reassignment.

Civilians could also be rewarded for their assistance to the Roman legions. In return for outstanding service, a citizen was given an arrow without a head. This was considered a great honour and would bring the recipient much prestige.

== Discipline ==
The military discipline of the legions was harsh. Regulations were strictly enforced, and a broad array of punishments could be inflicted.

=== Minor punishments ===
- Castigatio – being hit by the centurion with his staff or animadversio fustium (Tac. Annals I, 23)
- Reduction of rations or to be forced to eat barley instead of the usual grain ration
- Pecuniaria mulcta – reduction in pay, fines or deductions from the pay allowance
- Flogging in front of the century, cohort or legion
- Whipping with the flagrum (flagellum, flagella), or "short whip" – a much more brutal punishment than simple flogging. The "short whip" was used by slave volunteers, volones, who constituted the majority of the army in the later years of the Roman Empire.
- Gradus deiectio – reduction in rank
- Missio ignominiosa – dishonourable discharge
- Loss of time in service advantages
- Militiae mutatio – relegation to inferior service or duties.
- Munerum indictio – additional duties

=== Major punishments ===
- Fustuarium – a sentence for desertion or dereliction of duty, stealing, false witness, sexual misconduct and repeating three times a same offense. The legionary would be stoned or beaten to death by cudgels, in front of the assembled troops, by his fellow soldiers or those whose lives had been put in danger. Soldiers under sentence of fustuarium who escaped were not pursued but lived under sentence of banishment from Rome. In the event that a group of legionaries are to be subjected to this punishment, the tribune would make an alteration in order to spare the majority of the accused. The tribune would first select a handful of the guilty men, and those selected would be condemned to the original penalty under the fustuarium. The remainder of the accused would then be driven out of the camp and forced to live in an undefended location for a chosen period of time; they were also limited to eating only barley.
- Decimation – according to 17th century belief (possibly folk etymology), the Romans practiced this punishment in which a sentence was carried out against an entire unit that had mutinied, deserted, or shown dereliction of duty. One out of every ten men, chosen by lots, would be beaten to death, usually by the other nine with their bare hands, who would be forced to live outside the camp and in some instances obliged to renew the military oath, the sacramentum.

== Factors in the legion's success ==
Reenactment: training

Montesquieu wrote that "the main reason for the Romans becoming masters of the world was that, having fought successively against all peoples, they always gave up their own practices as soon as they found better ones".

Examples of ideas that were copied and adapted include weapons like the gladius (Iberians) and warship design (cf. Carthaginians' quinquereme), as well as military units, such as heavy mounted cavalry and mounted archers (Numidians and Parthians).

- Roman organisation was more flexible than those of many opponents. Over time, the legions effectively handled challenges ranging from cavalry, to guerrillas, and to siege warfare.
- Roman discipline (cf. decimation), organization and systematization sustained combat effectiveness over a longer period. These elements appear throughout the legion in training, logistics, field fortification etc.
- The Romans were more persistent and more willing to absorb and replace losses over time than their opponents. Wars with Carthage and the Parthians and most notably, the campaigns against Pyrrhus of Epirus, illustrate this.
- Roman leadership was mixed, but over time it was often effective in securing Roman military success.
- The influence of Roman military and civic culture, as embodied particularly in the heavy infantry legion, gave the Roman military consistent motivation and cohesion.
- Strict, and more importantly, uniform discipline made commanding, maintaining, and replacing Roman legionaries a much more consistent exercise.
- Roman military equipment (cf. Roman military personal equipment), particularly armor, was of better quality and far more ubiquitous, especially in the late Republican and Early Imperial era, than that of most of their opponents. Soldiers equipped with shields, helmets and highly effective body armor had a major advantage over warriors protected, in many cases, with nothing other than their shields, particularly in a prolonged engagement.
- Roman engineering skills were second to none in ancient Europe, and their mastery of both offensive and defensive siege warfare, specifically the construction and investment of fortifications (cf. sudis, castra), was another major advantage for the Roman legions.
- Roman military training focused on the more effective thrusting of the sword rather than the slash.

== See also ==
- List of Roman wars
- List of Roman battles
- List of topics related to ancient Rome
- List of Roman legions
- List of Roman auxiliary regiments
- Military history of ancient Rome
- Structural history of the Roman military
- For a more detailed analysis, as well as the Romans in battle, see the articles Roman infantry tactics and Roman military personal equipment.

== Bibliography ==
- Addison, Penny; Bickham, Christian; Diamond, Anthony; Thompson, Steve (2008). Humanities Dimensions History. Port Melbourne, Victoria: Pearson Education Australia. p. 135. ISBN 978-0733989247.
- Julius Caesar (2024). The Gallic War. Vancouver: Royal Classics. ISBN 9781778785009.
- Campbell, Brian (2015). "legion". Oxford Research Encyclopedia of Classics. Oxford University Press. doi:10.1093/acrefore/9780199381135.013.3632. ISBN 978-0-19-938113-5.
- Connolly, Peter (1975). The Roman Army. Macdonald Educational. ISBN 0356051102.
- Connolly, Peter (1981). Greece and Rome at War. Englewood Cliffs: Prentice-Hall. ISBN 0133649768.
- Cornell, T. J. (1995). The Beginnings of Rome: Italy and Rome from the Bronze Age to the Punic Wars (c. 1000–264 BC). London: Routledge. ISBN 0415015952.
- Delbrück, Hans (1990). Warfare in Antiquity. History of the Art of War. Vol. 1. University of Nebraska Press. ISBN 080329199X.
- Dupuy, Ernest; Dupuy, Trevor (1986). The Encyclopedia Of Military History: From 3500 B.C. To The Present. New York: HarperCollins. ISBN 0062700561.
- Dupuy, Trevor N. (1984). The Evolution of Weapons and Warfare. New York: Da Capo Press. ISBN 0306803844.
- Dyer, Gwynne (1985). War. New York: Crown. ISBN 0051755610.
- The Encyclopedia of Ancient History, Legions, history and location of
- Ferrill, Arther (1988). The Fall of the Roman Empire: The Military Explanation. London: Thames and Hudson. ISBN 0500274959.
- Flavius Vegetius Renatus (2019). De Re Militari. Dubai: Harper-McLaughlin-Adet. ISBN 9781697849073.
- Goldsworthy, Adrian (2001). The Punic Wars. London: Cassell. ISBN 030435967X.
- Goldsworthy, Adrian (2007). The Complete Roman Army. London: Thames & Hudson. ISBN 978-0-500-05124-5.
- Goldsworthy, Adrian (2019). Roman Warfare. New York: Basic Books. ISBN 9781541699236.
- Goldsworthy, Adrian (1998). The Roman Army at War 100 BC – AD 200. Oxford: Clarendon Press. OCLC 895715358.
- Harkness, Albert (1887). The Military System Of The Romans. New York: D. Appleton and Company. OCLC 28211854.
- Hanson, Victor Davis (2010). Carnage and Culture. Paris: Flammarion. ISBN 978-2080800930.
- Keegan, John (1993). A History of Warfare. New York: Alfred A. Knopf. ISBN 0679730826.
- Parker, Henry Michael (1928). The Roman legions. Oxford: Clarendon press. OCLC 1151159640.
- Radin, Max (April 1915). "The Promotion of Centurions in Caesar's Army". The Classical Journal. 10 (7): 300–311. JSTOR 3287327.
- Rawson, Elizabeth (1971). "The Literary Sources for the Pre-Marian Army". Papers of the British School at Rome. 39: 13–31. doi:10.1017/S0068246200007789. ISSN 0068-2462.
- Rodgers, Nigel (2005). The Roman army : legions, wars and campaigns; a military history of the world's first superpower from the rise of the republic and the might of the empire to the fall of the west. London: Southwater. ISBN 1844762106.
- Smith, William (1875). A Dictionary of Greek and Roman Antiquities. London: John Murray.
- Taylor, Michael J. (2014). "Roman Infantry Tactics in the mid-Republic: A Reassessment". Historia: Zeitschrift für Alte Geschichte. 63 (3). Stuttgart: Franz Steiner: 301–322. JSTOR 24432811.
- Taylor, Michael J. (2020). "The Evolution of the Manipular Legion in the Early Republic". Historia: Zeitschrift für Alte Geschichte. 69 (1): 38–56. doi:10.25162/historia-2020-0003. ISSN 0018-2311. ProQuest 2328625404.
- Webster, Graham (1985). The Roman Imperial Army of the first and second centuries A.D. Totowa: Barnes & Noble. ISBN 0389205907.
- Zehnter, Stefan (2012). Legion GmbH. Das Unternehmen Römische Armee. Saarbrücken: AV Akademikerverlag. ISBN 978-3639405330.
