= Military tribune =

Officer of the Roman army

A military tribune (from Latin tribunus militum 'tribune of the soldiers') was an officer of the Roman army who ranked below the legate and above the praefectus castrorum (a centurion). Young men of Equestrian rank often served as military tribunes as a stepping stone to the Senate. The tribunus militum should not be confused with the elected political office of tribune of the people (tribunus plebis) nor with that of tribunus militum consulari potestate.

== Early Rome ==
The word tribunus derives from tribus, "tribe". In Rome's earliest history, each of the three tribes (Ramnes, Luceres, and Tities) sent one commander when an army was mustered, since there was no standing army. The tribunes were commanders of the original legion of 3,000. By the time of the Greek historian Polybius (d. 118 BC), the tribunes numbered six, and they were appointed by the consuls. However, the process by which tribunes were chosen and assigned is complex and varies at different times.

== Republican period ==
In the Republican period, there were six appointed to each legion. Authority was given to two at a time, and command rotated among the six. Tribunes were men of senatorial status appointed by the Roman Senate. To attain the position of tribune, one only needed to be a member of the ruling class. By 311 BC the plebeians acquired the right to elect sixteen tribunes of the soldiers, that is, four out of the six tribunes assigned to each of the four legions that formed the Roman army. Previously these places had been for the most part in the gift of consuls or dictators.

Additionally, in the early Republic, another type of military tribune was sometimes chosen in place of the annually elected consuls to be the heads of the Roman State. These are known in Latin as tribuni militum consulari potestate ("military tribunes with consular authority"). At the time only patricians could be chosen as consuls, but both patricians and plebeians could be elected as tribunes with consular authority. Instead of the usual two consuls, between four and six military tribunes were elected for the year. The reasons for this choice are obscure, though Livy often cast the decision according to the class struggles he saw as endemic during this period, with patricians generally favoring consuls and plebs the military tribunes. The office of "consular tribune" eventually fell out of use after 366 BC.

== After the Social Wars ==
After changes to Roman army driven by the Social War (91–87 BC) and subsequent civil wars (further formalised by the emperor Claudius), a professionalized military system was created, in which legions were commanded by a legionary legate (legatus). Six tribunes were still posted to a legion, but their duties and responsibilities had changed, becoming more a political position than a military rank. The second-in-command to the legate was the tribunus laticlavius or 'broad-stripe' tribune (named after the width of the stripe used to demarcate him on his tunic and toga), usually a young man of senatorial rank. He was given this position to learn and watch the actions of the legate. They often found themselves leading their unit in the absence of a legate, and some legions were permanently commanded by a broad-stripe tribune, such as those stationed in Egypt, as an Augustan law required that no member of the Senatorial Order ever enter Egypt.

In contrast to the broad-stripe tribune, the other five 'thin stripe' tribunes were lower in rank, and were called the tribuni angusticlavii. These 'officer cadets' were men of equestrian rank who had military experience, and yet had no authority: they were allowed to sit on a court martial but they held no power in battle. Most thin-stripe tribunes served the legionary legate, yet a lucky few (such as Agricola) were selected to serve on the staff of the provincial governor. According to Tacitus, they did not always take their appointment as seriously as they might, contrasting Agricola's tribuneship to his peers by saying "[Agricola did not], like many young men who convert military service into wanton pastime, avail himself licentiously or slothfully of his tribunitial title, or use his inexperience to spend his time in pleasures and absences from duty".

== Principate ==
Under Augustus, the five equestrian tribunes were sometimes promoted from the rank of centurion, and might advance to a command in the auxiliary cavalry or Praetorian Guard.

== See also ==
- List of Roman tribunes
