= Tribunus angusticlavius =

Senior military officer in ancient Rome

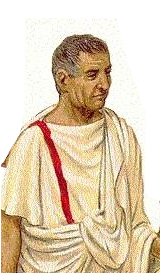
Tribunus angusticlavius

A tribunus angusticlavius ("narrow-striped tribune"; pl.: tribuni angusticlavii) was a senior military officer in the Roman legions during the late Roman Republic and the Principate.

The tribunus angusticlavius was a junior military tribune who was at least 20 years old, chosen from among the Equestrian order, as opposed to the tribunus laticlavius, who was chosen from the Senatorial class. There were five to each legion, identified by a narrow purple stripe (angustus clavus or angusticlavus) on their tunics. Despite their youth, the tribunes had previous experience, usually as a praefectus leading a quingenary auxiliary cohort. Their duties varied, mostly staff work, but also lead two cohorts. The next step of promotion was often as praefectus of a 500-strong cavalry ala. There were 141 of these at a time.
