= Publius Metilius Nepos =

Roman senator and governor of Britain (c. 45 – 127 AD)

Publius Metilius Nepos (c. 45 – 127 AD) was a Roman senator during the late 1st century. He is known to have been suffect consul in the nundinium of September to December 91, and was appointed Governor of Britannia by the Emperor Domitian before his death in 96, and held the post until 98.

During his governorship, the colonies of Colonia Domitiana Lindensium (Lincoln) and Colonia Nervia Glevensium (Gloucester) were founded.

Further details about Nepos are more difficult about which to be confident. The inscriptions of the Arval Brethren record a Publius Metilius Sabinus Nepos as one of their brotherhood who attended their meetings in the years 105, 110, and 111, who had died by 26 February 118 when a successor was co-opted in his place. On the other hand, a papyrus from Roman Egypt records the joint consulate of P. Metilius Nepos II and Marcus Annius Libo for 128; apparently Nepos died in late 127, and his term assigned to another person. Some assistance is provided by the presence of a "Metilius" -- who could be Publius Metilius Nepos or Publius Metilius Sabinus Nepos -- as suffect consul in 103. It is likely we have two consular senators with similar names: one died before February 118, the other in late 127.

Pliny the Younger addressed several letters to a Nepos, and at least one more to a Sabinus. It is not yet possible to determine which Nepos Pliny was writing to, nor even be assured he was writing to either of these Metilii Nepotes.

The question of children and descendants is an open one. On one hand there is a Publius Metilius P.f. Secundus, suffect consul in 123, who could be the son of either Metilii Nepotes; on the other, Anthony Birley notes there are two polyonymous senators of the next generation whose names include Metilius as part of their nomenclature: Marcus Sedatius Severianus, consul in 153, and Marcus Metilius Aquillius Regulus, consul in 157. The solution awaits further information.

Political offices
Preceded by Gnaeus Minicius Faustinus, and Publius Valerius Marinus as suffect consuls	Suffect consul of the Roman Empire; 91 with Quintus Valerius Vegetus	Succeeded by Domitian XVI, and Quintus Volusius Saturninus as ordinary consuls
Unknown Last known title holder: Aulus Vicirius Proculus	Roman governors of Britain c. 96-c. 97	Succeeded by Titus Avidius Quietus
