= Legate (ancient Rome) =

High-ranking Roman military officer

A legate (Latin: legatus, Classical Latin: [ɫeːˈɡaːtʊs]) was a high-ranking military officer in the Roman army, equivalent to a modern-era general officer. Initially used to delegate power, the term became formalised under Augustus as the officer in command of a Roman legion.

From the times of the Roman Republic, legates received large shares of the military's rewards at the end of a successful campaign. This made the position a lucrative one, so it could often attract even distinguished consuls or other high-ranking political figures within Roman politics (e.g., the consul Lucius Julius Caesar volunteered late in the Gallic Wars as a legate under his first cousin, Gaius Julius Caesar).

Diplomats and envoys sent by Rome were also given the title of legate.

== History ==
=== Roman Republic ===
The rank of legate existed as early as the Samnite Wars, but it was not until 190 BC that it started to be standardized, meant to better manage the higher numbers of soldiers the Second Punic War had forced to recruit. The legate of a Roman Republican army was essentially a supreme military tribune, drawn from among the senatorial class of Rome (usually a consul or proconsul), who acted as a second-in-command to the magistrate in charge of the force. This role was usually played by either seasoned generals or ambitious young senators; the latter option eventually displaced the military tribune as a path to gain recognition.

The legate was officially assigned by the Senate, the republic's highest governing body. An appointment was generally only done after consulting with the magistrate in command, hoping to pair a commander and a lieutenant who could work together without trouble. This was established to avoid clashes of leadership like that of the consuls Varro and Paulus in Cannae. The legate often acted as a military consultant or adviser, like Scipio Africanus did for his brother Lucius during the Roman–Seleucid War, or as a trusted man of action, as in the case of Lucius Quinctius Flamininus and his brother Titus in their campaigns.

After the changes in the army of the late Republic around the 1st century BCE (often referred to as the "Marian reforms", although the accuracy of this designation is disputed), the figure of the legate as a major second-in-command was eliminated. Multiple legati were assigned to every army, each in command of a legion, which was called legatus legionis. Julius Caesar made wide use of this title throughout the Gallic Wars. Initially, only conflicts on foreign ground had demanded the presence of legati, but the beginning of the Social War in 90 BC saw them being increasingly deployed in Italia.

There were two main positions. The legatus legionis was an ex-praetor given command of one of Rome's legions, while the legatus pro praetore was an ex-consul given the governorship of a Roman province, with the magisterial powers of a praetor, which in some cases included command of four or more legions. A legate was entitled to twelve lictors, who carried out punishments with fasces (bundled rods). A legatus legionis could order capital punishment.

=== Roman Empire ===
From Augustus onwards, the emperor gave the title of legatus legionis to senior commanders (former military tribunes) of a legion, except in Egypt and Mesopotamia where the legions were commanded by a praefectus legionis of an equestrian rank. The legatus legionis was under the supreme command of a legatus Augusti pro praetore of senatorial rank. If the province was defended by a single legion, the legatus Augusti pro praetore was also in direct command of the legion. This post was generally appointed by the emperor. The person chosen for this rank was a former tribune, and although the emperor Augustus set a maximum term of command of two years for a legatus, subsequent emperors extended the tenure to three or four years, although the incumbent could serve for a much longer period. In a province with only one legion, the legate served as the provincial governor, while in provinces with multiple legions each legion had a legate and a separate provincial governor who had overall command.

A legate was the principal commander of their assigned legion. The Legatus legionis would delegate operational duties to their command staff of Tribunus laticlavius, Praefectus castrorum, Tribunus angusticlavii & Primus pilus who would collectively be responsible for the legion's operational effectiveness.

The legate could be distinguished in the field by his elaborate Attic helmet and Lorica musculata or plumata, as well as a scarlet paludamentum (cloak), cincticulus (a sash tied around the waist) and a parazonium (status sword).

The senatorial legatus legionis was removed from the Roman army by Gallienus, who preferred to entrust the command of a legionary unit to a leader chosen from within the equestrian order who had a long military career.

The title has other uses from the period of Augustus onwards, following the constitutional resettlement of 27 BC "that senatorial governors in the People's provinces bore the republican title of 'proconsul', while those appointed by the Emperor bore a title which explicitly referred to their dependence on him, namely legatus, or deputy".

== Diplomatic legates ==
Legatus was also a term for an ambassador of the Roman Republic who was appointed by the Senate for a mission (legatio) to a foreign nation, as well as for ambassadors who came to Rome from other countries. The concept remains today as a diplomatic legation.

== See also ==
- Imperium
- Military tribune
- Praefectus castrorum
- Primus pilus (Principal Centurion)
- Principales (Junior officers)
- Tres militiae
