= Titus Haterius Nepos (consul) =

2nd century Roman senator and general

Titus Haterius Nepos was a Roman senator and general, who held several imperial appointments during the reign of Hadrian. He was suffect consul in the year AD 134, immediately succeeding Lucius Julius Ursus Servianus as the colleague of Titus Vibius Varus. According to an inscription found in Fulginiae in Umbria, surmised to be his home town, he received triumphal ornaments for an unspecified military victory, as well as attesting his full name is Titus Haterius Nepos Atinas Probus Publicius Matenianus.

== Life ==
There is an equestrian Titus Haterius Nepos, who was praefectus of Egypt from the year 120 to 124, but he was clearly a different person from the senatorial Nepos. The first inscription to attest to the senatorial Nepos is from the records of the Arval Brethren, which attest to his presence at two of their functions in 120. This was a priesthood which was only open to senators, not equites; only equites could be procurators of Egypt. From the name it is possible the procurator was the birth father of the senator, but their relationship is otherwise unknown.

Two appointments are known for Nepos. The first was governor of Arabia Petraea, evinced by his name appearing in two papyri recovered from the Cave of Letters in the Judean Desert; they are dated to 17 November 130 and 9 July 131. Werner Eck admits to the possibility Nepos replaced the previous governor Lucius Aninius Sextius Florentinus, who had died in office some time after 2 December 127. An inscription found at Jerash, dedicated to Nepos while he was governor, addresses him as consul; this implies Nepos was consul in absentia, or while still praetorian governor of Arabia.

The inscription from Fulginiae records that Nepos had been admitted into the College of Pontiffs, likely after his consulship. His second appointment, as governor of Pannonia Superior, also fell after his consulate. This appointment is attested by a military diploma; Géza Alföldy dates his tenure in that office from 137 to around 141.

His life after he left Pannonia Superior is a blank.

Although his wife has not been identified, Nepos has been identified as the father of Tiberius Haterius Saturninus, suffect consul in 164.

== The military victory ==
Earlier scholars presumed that Nepos had been awarded triumphal ornaments for a victory against invading Germans while governor of Pannonia Superior, and was cited as explaining why Aelius Caesar, Hadrian's designated heir prior to his selection of Antoninus Pius, had been stationed on the Danube for a year. However, in a paper published in 1999 Werner Eck argued that the evidence better fit if Nepos was seen as one of the victorious Roman generals during the Bar Kochba revolt, which raged at the time. It is unclear if Nepos led a military force into the rebellious province, or he had to combat Jews in Roman Arabia who revolted in sympathy with Bar Kochba; Eck notes that if the revolt spread to Nepos' province, it would help explain Cassius Dio's remark that "the Jews everywhere . . . were gathering together, and giving evidence of great hostility to the Romans". The German scholar also notes that "Haterius Nepos' direct involvement in the revolt goes a long way to explain the flight of the Jews from Arabia" -- referring to the Jews whose archives were found in the Cave of Letters.

== See also ==
- List of Roman consuls

Political offices
Preceded by Lucius Julius Ursus Servianus III; Titus Vibius Varus as ordinary consuls	Roman consul 134 (suffect) with Titus Vibius Varus	Succeeded by Publius Licinius Pansa; Lucius Attius Macro as suffect consuls
