= Quintus Fabius Julianus =

Quintus Fabius Julianus was a Roman senator active during the first half of the second century AD. He was suffect consul for the nundinium of May to August 131 as the colleague of Lucius Fabius Gallus. He is known only through surviving inscriptions.

The existence of Fabius Julianus was not known until the publication of the military diploma mentioning him in 2005. In that article, Werner Eck and Andreas Pangerl admitted that he might be related to his colleague Gallus. They offered some possible identifications. One was Quintus Fabius Iulianus Optatianus Lucius Fabius Geminus Cornelianus, a consul known from a lost inscription, who was the son of a Marcus who belonged to the tribe Galeria; Eck and Pangerl infer from these facts that Julianus came from Hispania Baetica. Another possible identification is Marcus Fabius Iulianus Heracleo Optatianus, whose membership in the Arval Brethren has been attested from 135 to 155. However, it is more likely that Julianus is the older brother of the member of the Brethren. A third possibility is the father of Fabia H[---]la (which Mommsen restored as "Fabia H[adrianil]la", although Eck and Pangerl offered the possible restoration "H[eracleanil]la" or "H[eracleonil]la"), both of whom are mentioned in an inscription from Hispania. Insufficient information has been found to determine which of these three possibilities is the most likely.

Political offices
Preceded by Sergius Octavius Laenas Pontianus, and Marcus Antonius Rufinus as Ordinary consuls	Consul of the Roman Empire; 131 with Lucius Fabius Gallus	Succeeded by Gaius Junius Serius Augurinus, and Gaius Trebius Sergianus as Ordinary consuls
