= Marcus Acilius Priscus Egrilius Plarianus =

Marcus Acilius Priscus Egrilius Plarianus was a Roman senator, who held a number of imperial appointments during the reign of Emperor Hadrian. Mireille Corbier considers him the best known of the Egrilii Plariani, due to the large number of inscriptions referring to him.

The senator was born a member of the Egrilii Plariani, a prominent family of Ostia; in his monograph of naming practices in the first centuries of the Roman Empire, Olli Salomies speculates he was born Quintus Egrilius A.f. His father was Aulus Egrilius Rufus, a prominent decurion of Ostia, attested as duovir and flamen Romae et Augusti; his mother was Plaria Q.f. Vera; his brother was Aulus Egrilius Plarianus suffect consul in AD 128. The name elements "Acilius Priscus" were long suspected as coming from adoption; the discovery in 1938 of the base of a statue of Marcus Acilius Priscus, another duovir of Ostia and flamen Romae et Augusti, allowed H. Bloch to identify the adoptive father.

== Career ==
His cursus honorum is known from a three inscriptions set up in Ostia. Priscus began his career as one of the quattuorviri viarum curandarum, one of the four boards that form the vigintiviri; membership in one of these four boards was a preliminary and required first step toward a gaining entry into the Roman Senate. He then was commissioned a military tribune with Legio V Macedonica, stationed at Troesmis on the Danube, in the imperial province of Moesia Inferior. He returned to Rome to hold the office of quaestor, which he served at the city, and upon completion of this traditional Republican magistracy Priscus would be enrolled in the Senate. Two more of the traditional Republican magistracies followed: aedile plebis Cerialis, and praetor.

After stepping down from the praetorship, Priscus held a series of posts. First he held a pair of consecutive appointments as legatus or assistant to two proconsuls, the first was in the public province of Sicily, the second Asia. This was followed by his own governorship of the public province of Gallia Narbonensis; Werner Eck dates his governorship to the term 119/120. He then received a commission as legatus legionis or commander of Legio VIII Augusta, at the time garrisoned at Argentorate. Corbier believes it was this appointment that led to Priscus being appointed prefectus of the aerarium militare; this was followed by his appointment as prefectus of the aerarium Saturni, where he was the colleague of Lucius Aurelius Gallus; Corbier dates this post after his brother's tenure or to the year 126.

It is at this point the evidence of his life ends. Corbier speculates that it is possible that Priscus, like his brother, achieved a suffect consulship. She is more certain that, like his brother, Priscus continued the family tradition of being a patron of the city of Ostia.

== Family ==
Although there is no information about the name of his wife, there is evidence that Priscus had two children: a son, Quintus Egrilius Plarianus suffect consul in 144; and a daughter Egrilia M.f. Plaria. His relationship to Gaius Acilius Priscus, suffect consul in 132, is unknown.
