= Lucius Aurelius Gallus (suffect consul) =

Lucius Aurelius Gallus was a Roman senator, who held a series of appointments during the first half of the second century AD. A military diploma found in Morocco attests that he was suffect consul on 18 August for one of the years between 129 and 132 as the colleague of ...cus Priscus. Gallus is known entirely from inscriptions.

== Life ==
The origins of Aurelius Gallus are enigmatic. Hans-Georg Pflaum speculates his grandfather may have been one of the signatories to a promulgation of Lucius Helvius Agrippa, proconsul of Sardinia, dated 18 March 69.

An inscription from the base of a statue, erected by one Marcus Aemilius Alcima at Rome, who describes himself as Gallus' amicus but is otherwise unknown, provides us the details of his cursus honorum; although the inscription has been known for years, due to uncertainty if it belonged to him, or one of his three homonymous descendants, it was not until an article by Pflaum that he was properly identified as the subject of the inscription. The earliest office Gallus is recorded as holding was quaestor, which he discharged in the province of Asia; upon completion of this traditional Republican magistracy he was enrolled in the Senate. Two more of the traditional Republican magistracies followed: plebeian tribune and praetor.

Upon completing his term as praetor, Gallus was selected as legatus or assistant to the proconsular governor of Africa. Upon returning to Rome, he was appointed curator of a network of roads in Etruria: the Via Clodia, Annia, Cassia, Cimina, and the Via Nova Trajana; Pflaum dates his curatorship of these roads to the years 117–120. Following this, Gallus was appointed legatus legionis or commander of the Legio III Gallica stationed at Raphaneae in Syria. He returned to Rome, where the sortition allocated him the public province of Gallia Narbonensis to govern; Werner Eck assigns the term 124/125 to his tenure in that province. Gallus received two more appointments at Rome: first was prefectus frumenti dandi, or overseer of the distribution of wheat to the citizens of Rome; next was prefect of the aerarium Saturni, or the public treasury, where he was the colleague of Marcus Acilius Priscus Egrilius Plarianus. At this point, historian Mireille Corbier comments, "The prefecture of the aerarium Saturni is the culmination of a long line of Praetorian posts that led our senator to the four corners of the empire, and the consulate is the normal conclusion of a well-conducted, but uninspired (mais sans éclat) career".

His consulate followed soon after this last appointment; Corbier suggests Gallus was in his 50s when he acceded to this post. Details of Gallus' life after the consulate have not been identified.

== Family ==
As Gallus was a homo novus, or the first of his family to be consul, all that is known of his father is his praenomen from his filation: Lucius. Although the name of his wife has not come down to us, a son has been identified for him, Lucius Aurelius Gallus, consul in 146.
