= Urvinia gens =

Ancient Roman family

The gens Urvinia was an obscure plebeian family at ancient Rome. No members of this gens are mentioned by Roman writers, but several are known from inscriptions.

== Origin ==
The nomen Urvinius belongs to a class of gentilicia originally formed from cognomina ending in -inus, later sometimes derived from other nomina.

== Praenomina ==
The main praenomina of the Urvinii were Gaius, Publius, and Quintus, among the most abundant names at all periods of Roman history. A few members of this gens bore other common praenomina, including Lucius and Titus.

== Members ==
This list includes abbreviated praenomina. For an explanation of this practice, see filiation.

- Urvinius C. f., a priest mentioned in an inscription from Adria in Picenum, dating between the middle of the second century and the late first century BC.
- Publius Urvinius P. f., a native of Forum Fulvii in Gallia Narbonensis, was a speculator, or scout, in the Legio XIII Gemina. He was buried at Mogontiacum in Germania Superior, aged thirty-five, in an early first-century tomb dedicated by his cousin, Marcus Aruntius.
- Gaius Urvinius Senecio, buried at Trebula Mutusca in Samnium, along with Titus Sarrenius Geminus, in an early first-century tomb dedicated by Quintus Vibius Kanio, one of the Seviri Augustales, and his brother, Publius Vibius.
- Quintus Urvinius, the former master of Gnaeus Cornelius Neritus, a freedman and one of the Seviri Augustales, buried at Verona in Venetia and Histria, in a tomb dating from the first half of the first century.
- Quintus Urvinius, a soldier buried at Argentorate in Germania Superior, aged twenty-eight, in a tomb dating from the first half of the first century.
- Titus Urvinius, named in an inscription from Pompeii in Campania.
- Publius Urvinius P. f. Fortunatus, a youth buried at Carnuntum in Pannonia Superior, aged seventeen, in a first-century tomb built by his mother, Successa.
- Gaius Urvinius Abascantus, buried at Aquileia in Venetia and Histria, in a tomb dating between the middle of the first and the middle of the second century.
- Gaius Urvinius Crescens, built a tomb at Rome, dating from the Flavian Dynasty, for his young son, Gaius Urvinius Ephaestus.
- Gaius Urvinius C. f. Ephaestus, a little boy buried at Rome, aged three years, five months, and eight days, in a Flavian-era tomb built by his father, Gaius Urvinius Crescens.
- Urvinia T. l. Tyche, a freedwoman buried in a late first- or early second-century tomb at Ventippo in Hispania Baetica, along with the freedman Quintus Vibius Firmillo.
- Quintus Urvinius Q. l. Callistus, a freedman, built a temple for Saturn at Uchi Maius in Africa Proconsularis, using funds allocated by the local decurions, in AD 98.
- Gaius Urvinius Pyrrhus, named in a second-century inscription from Fulginiae in Etruria. Part of the inscription may be modern.
- Gaius Urvinius Sabinianus, inurned at Rome, in a second-century cinerarium dedicated by Publius Calpurnius Brocchus and Gaius Catius Callistion, guardians of his daughters.
- Publius Urvinius Pastor, a soldier in the eighteenth volunteer cohort, buried at Gerulata in Pannonia Superior, aged thirty-five, along with Papia Elpis, aged forty, Urvinia Mussa, and Publius Urvinius Marcellinus, probably his siblings, in a family sepulchre dating between the last quarter of the second century and the end of the third, built by his mother, Papia Matercia, and brothers, Publius Urvinius Messius and Julius Major.
- Urvinia Mussa, buried at Gerulata, aged twenty-eight, in a family sepulchre built by Papia Matercia, Publius Urvinius Messius, and Julius Major, probably her mother and brothers, dating between the last quarter of the second century and the end of the third.
- Publius Urvinius Marcellinus, buried at Gerulata, aged twenty-two, in a family sepulchre built by Papia Matercia, Publius Urvinius Messius, and Julius Major, probably his mother and brothers, dating between the last quarter of the second century and the end of the third.
- Publius Urvinius Messius, along with his mother, Papia Matercia, and brother, Julius Major, built a family sepulchre at Gerulata, dating between the last quarter of the second century and the end of the third, for his brother, Publius Urvinius Pastor, and for Papia Elpis, Urvinia Mussa, and Publius Urvinius Marcellinus, probably also his siblings.

=== Undated Urvinii ===
- Lucius Urvinius L. (f.?), buried at Thubursicum in Africa Proconsularis.
- (Gaius) Urvinius C. f. Secundus, built a tomb at Lambaesis in Numidia for his brother, Gaius Urvinius Victor.
- Urvinia Maximilla Successa, buried at Uchi Maius, aged thirty.
- Lucius Urvinius Thiasus, named in pottery inscriptions from Liguria.
- Gaius Urvinius C. f. Victor, buried at Lambaesis, aged thirty, in a tomb built by his brother, Urvinius Secundus.
- Publius Urvinius Q. f. Vitalis, buried at Uchi Maius, aged forty.

== See also ==
- List of Roman gentes

== Bibliography ==
- Theodor Mommsen et alii, Corpus Inscriptionum Latinarum (The Body of Latin Inscriptions, abbreviated CIL), Berlin-Brandenburgische Akademie der Wissenschaften (1853–present).
- René Cagnat et alii, L'Année épigraphique (The Year in Epigraphy, abbreviated AE), Presses Universitaires de France (1888–present).
- George Davis Chase, "The Origin of Roman Praenomina", in Harvard Studies in Classical Philology, vol. VIII, pp. 103–184 (1897).
- Friedrich Hild, Supplementum epigraphicum zu CIL III: das pannonische Niederösterreich, Burgenland und Wien 1902–1968 (Epigraphic Supplement to CIL III: Pannonian Lower Austria, Burgenland, and Vienna 1902–1968), Vienna (1968).
