= Publius Juventius Celsus =

Roman jurist and politician, c. 67–130

Publius Juventius Celsus Titus Aufidius Hoenius Severianus (c. 67 – c. 130) — the son of a little-known jurist of the same name, hence also Celsus filius — was, together with Julian, the most influential ancient Roman jurist of the High Classical era.

== Public life ==
Celsus was presumably born in upper Italy, where the gentilicium of Juventius was common and where senatorial Juventii can also be found. In either 106 or 107, Celsus was praetor. In 114/115 he was governor of Thracia, and afterwards he became suffect consul for the nundinium of May to August 115 as the colleague of Lucius Julius Frugi. Celsus held the office of consul the second time as consul ordinarius for the year 129 with Lucius Neratius Marcellus as his colleague. He achieved the apex of a successful senatorial career when he became proconsul of Asia in 129/130.

== As a jurist ==
Celsus succeeded his father Juventius Celsus in the Proculian school of lawyers. He was part of the Consilium of Hadrian and helped bring about the Senatus consultum Iuventianum, which held that a good-faith possessor of an inheritance only had to yield it back inasmuch as he was enriched by it. Another dictum of his, impossibilium nulla obligatio est – impossible obligations are void – has become a core tenet of civil law.

Celsus' legal style was bold and biting. Pliny the Younger did, however, criticise his rhetorical weaknesses. Celsus' principal work was his libri digestorum 39, of which books 1-27 discussed Hadrian's edicts -- books 1-12 and 24–27 on the order of the edicts, and books 13-23 concerned legacies and wills -- while books 28-39 discussed the laws the Senate promulgated and numerous senatus consulta.

=== Notable dicta ===
- Ius est ars boni et aequi – Law is the art of the good and the equitable (Dig. 1, 1, 1)
- Scire leges non hoc est verba earum tenere, sed vim ac potestatem – Knowing the laws does not mean knowing their words, but their intent and purpose(Dig. 1, 3, 17)
- Incivile est, nisi tota lege perspecta, una aliqua particula eius proposita iudicare vel respondere – It is not artful to judge or to counsel based on a snippet of the law, without taking into consideration the law in its entirety (Dig. 1, 3, 24)
- Impossibilium nulla obligatio est - There is no obligation to do the impossible(Dig. 50, 17, 185)
- Nihil aliud est actio quam ius quod nobis debeatur, iudicio persequendi - An action is nothing else but the right to recover by judicial process on the merits that which is owing to one (Dig. 44, 7, 51)

== Sources ==
- Ernst Diehl, "Iuventius 13", Realencyclopädie der classischen Altertumswissenschaft Bande X,2 Sp. 1362–1363.
- PIR ² I 882
- Dlugosch, Michaela (2001). "Celsus filius". In Michael Stolleis (ed.). Juristen: ein biographisches Lexikon; von der Antike bis zum 20. Jahrhundert (in German) (2nd ed.). München: Beck. p. 127. ISBN 3-406-45957-9.

Political offices
Preceded by Lucius Vipstanus Messalla; Marcus Pedo Vergilianus as suffect consuls	Roman consul 115 (suffect) with Lucius Julius Frugi	Succeeded by Marcus Pompeius Macrinus Neos Theophanes; Titus Vibius Varus as suffect consuls
Preceded by Aulus Egrilius Plarianus, and Q. [...] as suffect consuls	Roman consul II; 129 with Lucius Neratius Marcellus II, followed by Quintus Julius Balbus	Succeeded by Quintus Fabius Catullinus; Marcus Flavius Aper as ordinary consuls
