= Titus Calestrius Tiro Orbius Speratus =

Titus Calestrius Tiro Orbius Speratus was a Roman senator who held a series of offices in the emperor's service. He was suffect consul late in the year 122 as the colleague of Gaius Trebius Maximus.

He is one of three Titi Calestrii Tirones identified as living in the first half of the second century. One is the friend of Pliny the Younger, who was praetor in the year 93; next is the subject of this article; the third is Titus Calestrius Tiro Julius Maternus, governor of Lycia et Pamphylia from 136 to 138 and the son of the second. Ronald Syme observes that the gentilicium Calestrius is Etruscan in origin, and rare, attested only at Veii in Italy.

== Life ==
The cursus honorum of Calestrius Tiro can be recovered in part from a Greek inscription his son erected at Iotape (modern Aytap). His earliest known office was quaestor which he served in Bithynia and Pontus; Bernard Rémy dates his tenure in this office as falling between 102 and 104. This was followed by his service as a legatus or assistant to the proconsular governor of Gallia Narbonensis. Calestrius Tiro returned to Rome where he advanced through the traditional Republican magistracies of plebeian tribune and praetor. Once he stepped down from his praetorship, Calestrius Tiro was appointed curator of the Viae Valeria, Tiburtina, and a third road whose name is lost. He was then commissioned legatus legionis or commander of Legio V Macedonica, stationed in Syria. After this, he governed two provinces. The first was the public province of Achaea; Werner Eck dates his tenure to the proconsular term 111/112. The second was Cilicia; Eck dates his tenure in this province from the year 113 to 116.

Rémy observes that the wait between Calestrius Tiro' last attested appointment and his advancement to the consulate is notable, and suggests that while he was favored by Trajan, he may have been a member of the party opposed to Trajan's successor Hadrian, and the delay was, at least in part, punishment for this. Details of the life of Calestrius Tiro after his consulate are yet unknown.

Political offices
Preceded by Tiberius Julius Candidus Capito, and Lucius Vitrasius Flamininus as suffect consuls	Suffect consul of the Roman Empire; AD 122 with Gaius Trebius Maximus	Succeeded by Quintus Articuleius Paetinus, and Lucius Venuleius Apronianus Octavius Priscus as ordinary consuls
