= Lucius Vitrasius Flamininus =

Roman senator who was suffect consul in 122

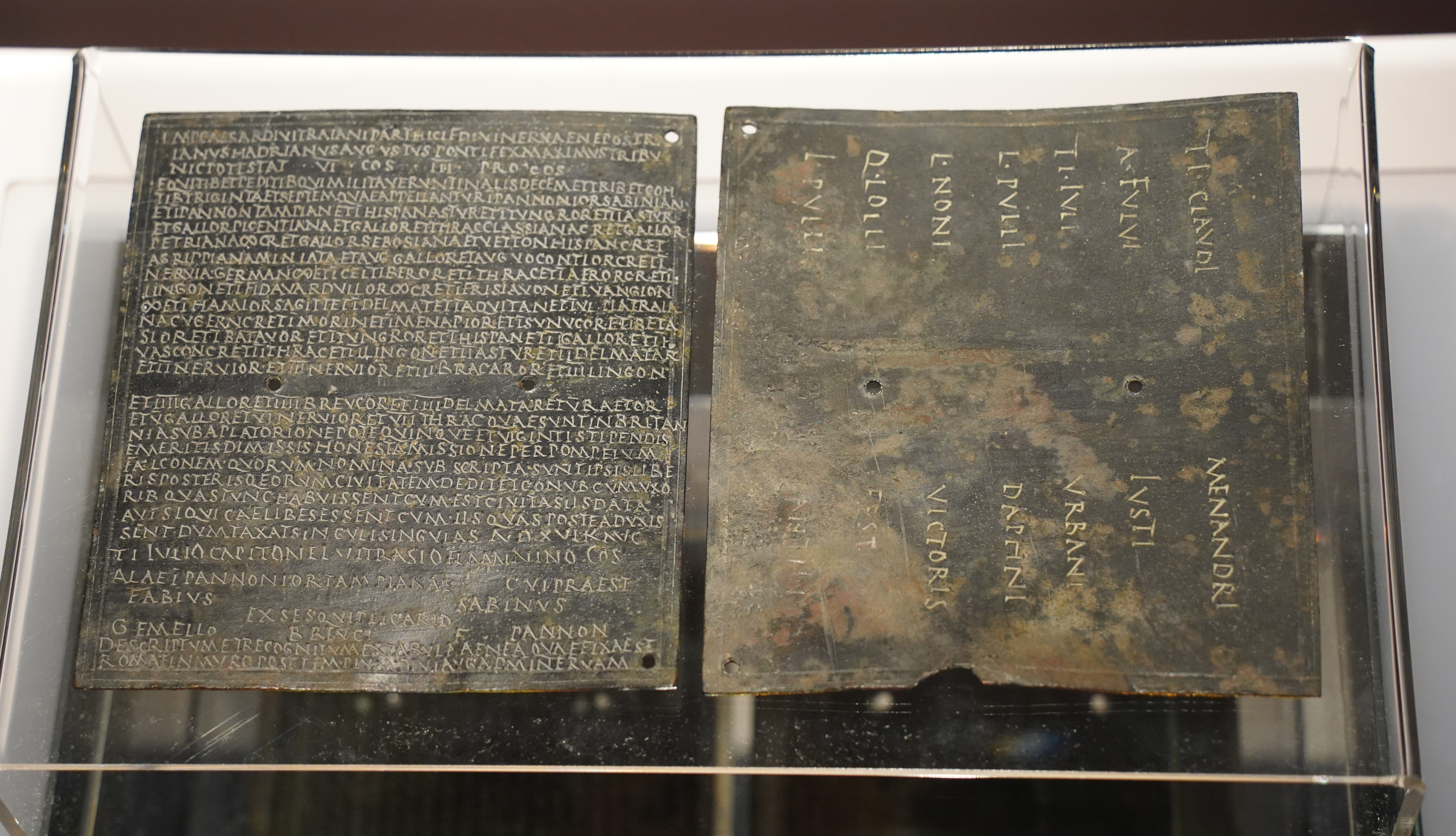
- Military diploma CIL XVI, 69, dated July 17th 122, attesting him as suffect consul

suffect consul

Lucius Vitrasius Flamininus was a Roman senator of the second century. He was suffect consul during 122 as the colleague of Tiberius Julius Candidus Capito. Flamininus is primarily known from inscriptions.

The Vitrasii were originally an equestrian family of Campania; the earliest known member, Vitrasius Pollio, served as a Procurator of Egypt under the Emperor Tiberius. Flamininus was the first known member of the Vitrasii to be a Senator.

Flamininus' cursus honorum can be reconstructed in part from an inscription found in Cales, erected by his father Lucius Vitrasius Ennius Aequus. Following his consulate, Flamininus is described as legatus or governor of "Italia Transpadana and the province of Moesia Superior and exercitus, and the province of Dalmatia". Ronald Syme examines this peculiar combination of provinces and a military command, and considers the possibility that Ernst Stein first raised that Flamininus held these commands simultaneously but could not provide a reason; it was another scholar, Zwikker, who suggested that the demands of the Marcomannic Wars was the reason. Syme notes, "The notion of a single command tenuously extended all the way from Piedmont to Serbia is highly vulnerable. Let the Transpadana therefore be dissociated." Syme argues that Flamininus governed at least some of these at different times, and that his command of an exercitus or military force was to "clean up latrones in Bosnia and western Serbia, whether recalcitrants or conveniently deemed such." Werner Eck provides the date of 130 to 133 for Flamininus' administration of the imperial province of Moesia Superior.

The next office listed on the inscription is curator alvei Tiberis riparum cloacum urbi, or one of the officials responsible for public works inside the city of Rome, regulating the Tiber and the maintenance of the city's sanitation system. His career was capped with the prestigious office of proconsular governor of Africa, which has been dated to 137/138.

Political offices
Preceded by Manius Acilius Aviola, and Lucius Corellius Neratius Pansa as ordinary consuls	Suffect consul of the Roman Empire; AD 122 with Tiberius Julius Candidus Capito	Succeeded by Gaius Trebius Maximus, and Titus Calestrius Tiro Orbius Speratus as suffect consuls
