= Tiberius Claudius Quartinus =

2nd century senator, consul and governor

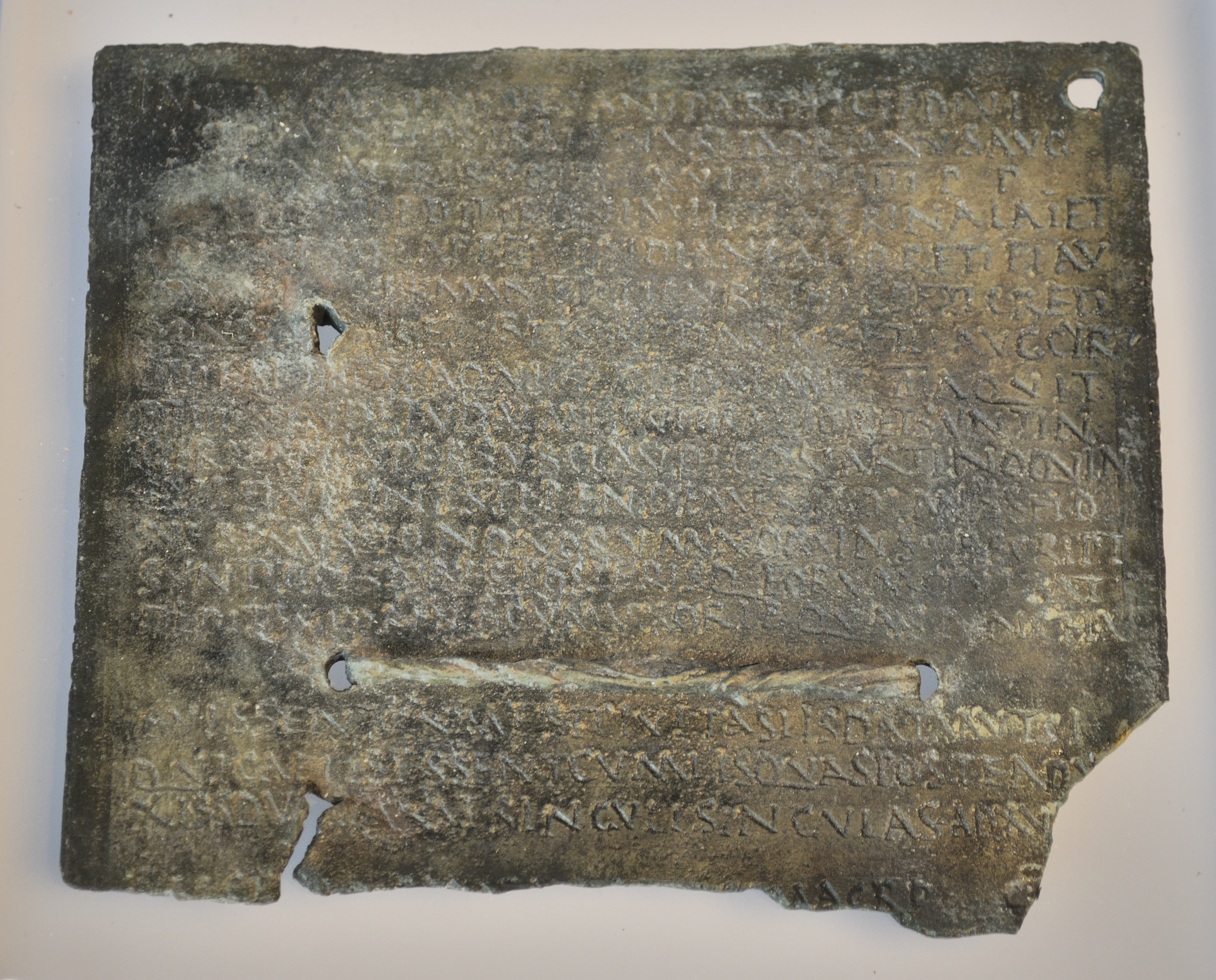
- Military diploma CIL XVI, 80, dated 16 October 134 AD, attesting him as governor

Suffect Consul of the Roman Empire
- In office c. 130 AD – c. 130 AD

Governor of Germania Superior
- In office c. 134 AD – c. 135 AD

Personal details
- Born: c. 1st century AD
- Died: c. 2nd century AD
- Occupation: Ancient Roman politician

Tiberius Claudius Quartinus was a Roman senator active during the first half of the second century AD. Originally of the equestrian class, Quartinus was suffect consul during 130 as the colleague of Cassius Agrippa. Quartinus is known primarily from inscriptions.

== Life ==
An inscription from Lugdunum (now lost) provides details of his cursus honorum. Quartinus began his career in the emperor's service as an equestrian tribune with Legio III Cyrenaica, which was stationed at Bostra in Syria. He pleased the emperor Trajan, who adlected him in splendissimum ordinem, which, Ronald Syme explains, means that he was "given the latus clavus and he entered the Senate as quaestor urbanus". Syme also offers a possible reason for this honor: as tribune in III Cyrenaica, Quartinus participated in the Roman occupation of Arabia Petraea in the years 105/106.

Despite this honor, Quartinus' career was not rapid. After reaching the praetorship, he was legate to a proconsul of Asia, then juridicus in Hispania Tarraconensis, which duties we know he carried out in the years 117 and 119. During a period of strife with Parthia in 123, Quartinus was commander of a force composed of the legions II Traiana and III Cyrenaica, and their auxiliaries. He had to serve as governor of Gallia Lugdunensis before at last acceding to his consulate, over twenty years after he had been promoted to senatorial status. Werner Eck, in his list of senatorial office-holders for this period, cannot provide a more specific date for Quartinus' tenure in Lugdunensis than "between 123 and 130".

Quartinus was also assigned another office in the emperor's service, governor of Germania Superior, where a military diploma attests his presence in the province on 16 October 134. Anthony Birley regards him as possibly serving as governor of Britain in the mid-130s. The last office Quartinus is known to have held was the proconsular governorship of Asia, at a date estimated by Géza Alföldy to be 144/145.

Admission of Quartinus to the septemviri epulonum, one of the four major priesthoods of ancient Rome, is no longer accepted; he likely held a minor priesthood of curio.

Political offices
Preceded by Quintus Fabius Catullinus, and Marcus Flavius Aper as ordinary consuls	Suffect consul of the Roman Empire; AD 130 with Cassius Agrippa	Succeeded by Sergius Octavius Laenas Pontianus, and Marcus Antonius Rufinus as ordinary consuls
