= Lucius Fabius Gallus =

Roman senator during the first half of the second century AD

Lucius Fabius Gallus was a Roman senator active during the first half of the second century AD. He was suffect consul for 131 with Quintus Fabius Julianus as his colleague. Gallus is known only from non-literary sources.

Until the publication of the military diploma mentioning him in 2005, Gallus was known only from stamps on lead pipes dated to the second century, attesting that he was the owner of a private water supply in Rome; even before the diploma had been found, Gallus had been believed to be of senatorial rank. Werner Eck and Andreas Pangerl admit that the owner of the water supply could be a descendant of the suffect consul. It is also possible that Gallus might also be related to his consular partner Julianus.

Political offices
Preceded by Sergius Octavius Laenas Pontianus, and Marcus Antonius Rufinus as Ordinary consuls	Consul of the Roman Empire; 131 with Quintus Fabius Julianus	Succeeded by Gaius Junius Serius Augurinus, and Gaius Trebius Sergianus as Ordinary consuls
