= Rammia gens =

The gens Rammia was an obscure plebeian family at ancient Rome. Members of this gens are first mentioned in the period leading to the Third Macedonian War, but no Rammius attained a position of importance in the Roman state until Quintus Rammius Martialis, governor of Egypt early in the second century AD.

== Praenomina ==
The chief praenomina of the Rammii were Lucius, Gaius, Quintus, and Publius, all of which were among the most common names throughout Roman history. Gnaeus, another common name, occurs in a filiation.

== Members ==
This list includes abbreviated praenomina. For an explanation of this practice, see filiation.

- Lucius Rammius, (Note: Appian refers to him as Erennius.) a resident of Brundisium, was approached by Perseus of Macedon, who wished him to poison certain Roman generals. Rammius revealed the plot to the legate Gaius Valerius Laevinus, whom he accompanied to Rome in order to repeat the charge before the senate.
- Gaius Rammius C. l., a freedman mentioned in an inscription from Minturnae in Latium, dating to 65 BC.
- Gaius Rammius, the master of Diphilus, a slave named in an inscription from Mintunae.
- Quintus Rammius, the master of Karius, a slave named in an inscription from Minturnae.
- Publius Rammius Eros, buried at Casilinum in Campania in a tomb built by Fausta, a freedwoman, dating from the latter part of the first century BC.
- Publius Rammius P. l. Chrestus, a freedman named in an inscription from Casilinum, dating to 12 BC.
- Rammius, mentioned in an inscription from Salinae in Britain, dating to AD 105.
- Quintus Rammius Martialis, prefect of Egypt in AD 118, had previously served as prefect of the vigiles at Rome.
- Rammia Prisca, the wife of Titus Flavius Euanthus, according to an inscription dating to the first or second century AD.
- Gaius Rammius Justus, named in an inscription from Ostia in Latium, dating to AD 172.
- Gaius Rammius Faustus, named in an inscription from Ostia, dating to AD 172.
- Gaius Julius Rammius Eutychus, one of the seviri Augustales, named in two inscriptions from Ostia, dating to the early third century.
- Gaius Julius Rammius Hilarus, a client of Gaius Julius Rammius Eutychus.

=== Undated Rammii ===
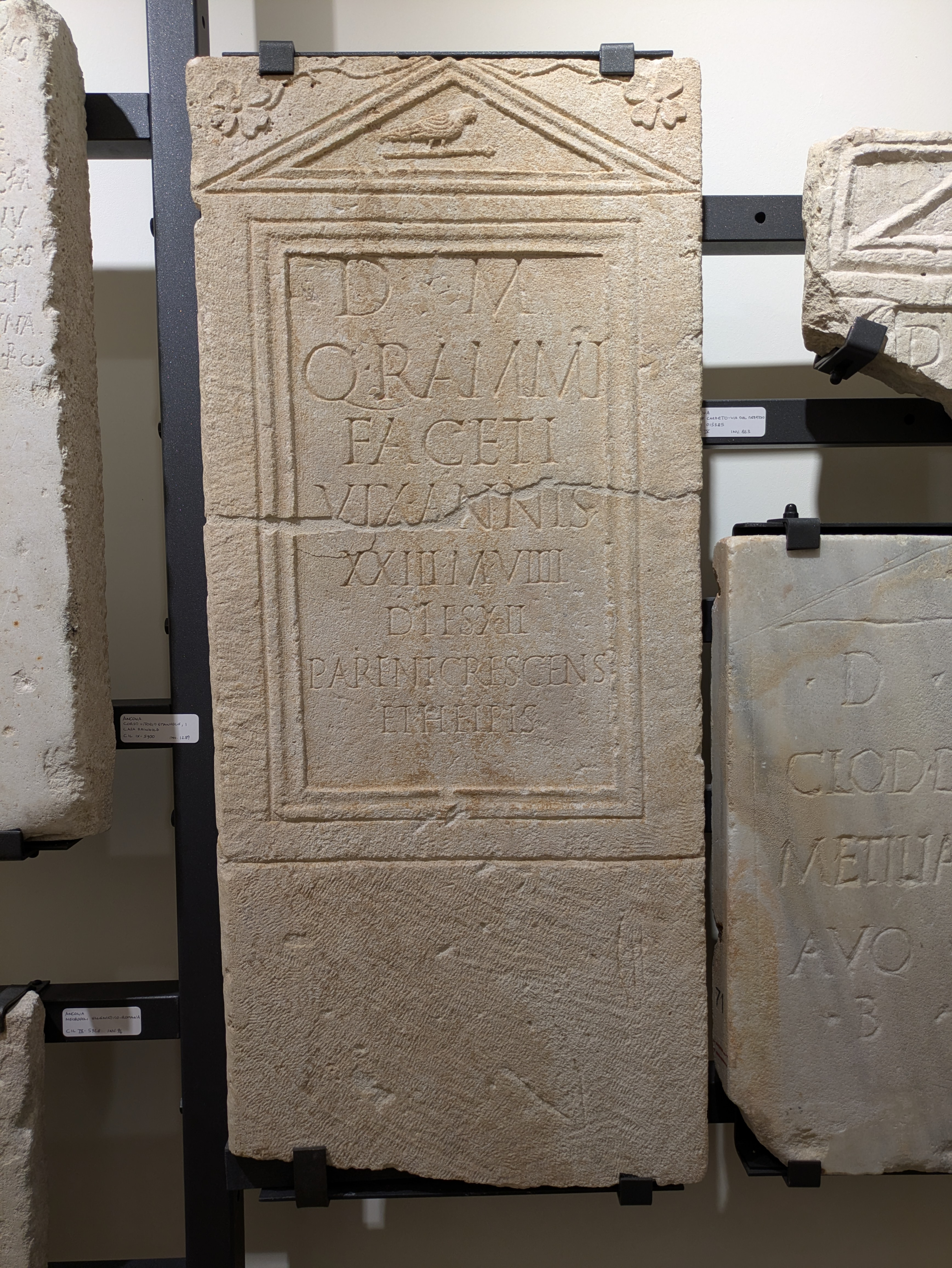
Inscription of Quintus Rammius Facetus (EDR 015385)

- Rammia, named in an inscription from Circeii in Latium.
- Quintus Rammius, named in an inscription from Rome.
- Rammia Callytiche, buried at Ancona in Picenum.
- Gaius Rammius Conopis, buried at Rome.
- Quintus Rammius Facetus, son of Crescens and Helpis, buried at Ancona, aged twenty-three years, eight months, and twelve days.
- Quintus Rammius Q. l. Fronto, a freedman, and one of the seviri Augustales, buried at Narbo in Gallia Narbonensis.
- Lucius Rammius Januarius, buried at Mactaris in Africa Proconsularis, aged eighty-five, together with his wife, Manlia Saturnina, aged eighty-eight, with a monument dedicated by their son, Lucius Manlius Victor.
- Rammia Primitiva, built a tomb for her husband, Quintus Alphius Quintillus, at Narbo.
- Rammia Sp. f. Prisca, buried at Narbo, together with Publius Cornelius Exoratus and Publius Cornelius Firmus.
- Rammia Cn. Cn. l. Statia, buried at Narbo.
- Rammia Tertiola, buried at Narbo, with her husband, Gaius Anbivius Clemens, and his brother, Gaius Anbivius Tertius.

== See also ==
- List of Roman gentes

== Bibliography ==
- Titus Livius (Livy), History of Rome.
- Appianus Alexandrinus (Appian), Macedonica (The Macedonian Wars).
- Dictionary of Greek and Roman Biography and Mythology, William Smith, ed., Little, Brown and Company, Boston (1849).
- Theodor Mommsen et alii, Corpus Inscriptionum Latinarum (The Body of Latin Inscriptions, abbreviated CIL), Berlin-Brandenburgische Akademie der Wissenschaften (1853–present).
- Notizie degli Scavi di Antichità (News of Excavations from Antiquity, abbreviated NSA), Accademia dei Lincei (1876–present).
- René Cagnat et alii, L'Année épigraphique (The Year in Epigraphy, abbreviated AE), Presses Universitaires de France (1888–present).
- Paul von Rohden, Elimar Klebs, & Hermann Dessau, Prosopographia Imperii Romani (The Prosopography of the Roman Empire, abbreviated PIR), Berlin (1898).
- T. Robert S. Broughton, The Magistrates of the Roman Republic, American Philological Association (1952).
- Marina Silvestrini, Le Tribù Romane, Bari (2010).
- Heikki Solin, Mika Kajava, & Olli Salomies, "Storie epigrafiche minturnesi" (Epigraphic Stories of Minturnae), in Epigraphica, vol. 77, pp. 466–482 (2015).
