= Lucius Attius Macro =

2nd century Roman senator, consul and governor

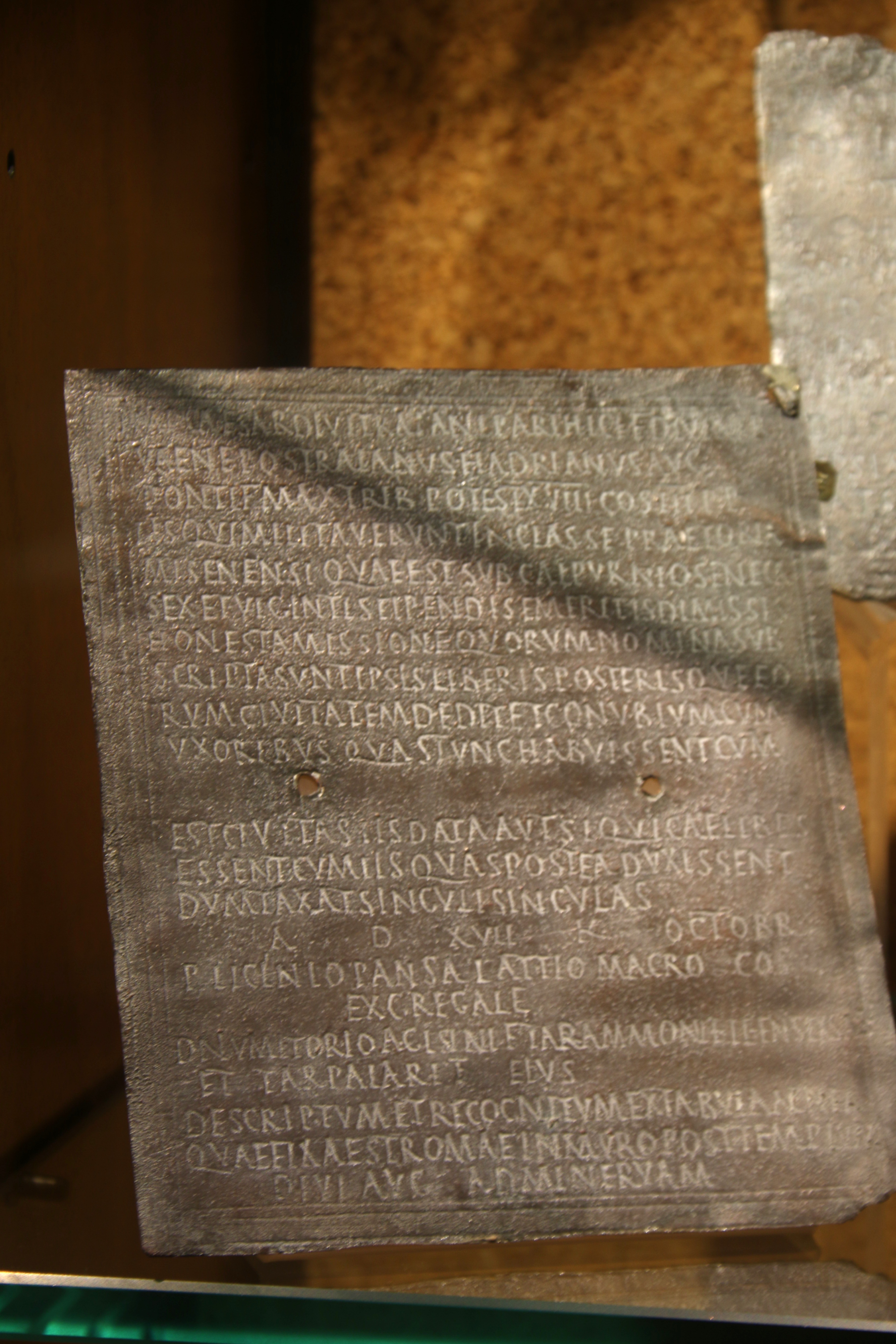
- Military diploma CIL XVI, 79, dated September 15th 134, attesting him as consul

suffect consul

Lucius Attius Macro was a Roman senator and general, who was active during the early second century. He was suffect consul in the later part of AD 134 as the colleague of Publius Licinius Pansa. He is known entirely from inscriptions.

After serving as praetor, Macro was legatus legionis or commander of two Roman legions: Legio I Adiutrix, which was stationed at Brigetio in Pannonia Superior; and Legio VII Gemina, which was stationed in Hispania Tarraconensis. Senators rarely commanded more than one legion in their career; in compiling a list of all men known to have commanded two or more, Anthony Birley identified only thirty-three men. Attius Macro is also attested as governor of Pannonia Inferior immediately before he acceded to the consulate; Werner Eck dates his tenure in that province from the year 130 to 134.

After he stepped down from the consulate, the life of Attius Macro is a blank.

Political offices
Preceded by Titus Haterius Nepos, and Titus Vibius Varus as suffect consuls	Suffect consul of the Roman Empire; 134 with Publius Licinius Pansa	Succeeded by Lucius Tutilius Lupercus Pontianus, and Publius Calpurnius Atilianus as ordinary consuls
