= Titus Vibius Varus (consul 134) =

2nd century Roman senator and ordinary consul

Titus Vibius Varus was a Roman senator who was ordinary consul in AD 134 as the colleague of Lucius Julius Ursus Servianus, the brother-in-law of the emperor Hadrian. He is known from inscriptions and the Digest (XXII, 5,3,1); he is also attested by a military diploma, which shows, that he was still in office on April 2, together with Titus Haterius Nepos as his colleague.

Bernard Rémy identifies Varus as the son of the homonymous suffect consul in 115. Rémy also suggests that their family came from Brixia in Istria, or Region X of Italy. In his monograph on naming practices in the early Roman Empire, Olli Salomies writes that Varus was the father of Titus Clodius Vibius Varus, ordinary consul of 160. Salomies also suggests that the gentilicum Clodius and the presence of the uncommon praenomen Titus may indicate Varus the elder was married to a Clodia, or a female member of the gens Clodius.

Vibius Varus is known to have held only one other office, governor of the imperial province of Cilicia; Werner Eck dates his tenure in Cilicia from the year 130 to 133.

Political offices
Preceded by Tiberius Claudius Atticus Herodes, and Publius Sufenas Verus as suffect consuls	Suffect consul of the Roman Empire; 134 with Lucius Julius Ursus Servianus followed by Titus Haterius Nepos	Succeeded by Publius Licinius Pansa, and Lucius Attius Macro as suffect consuls
