= Hateria gens =

Ancient Roman family

The gens Hateria, occasionally Ateria, was a plebeian family at ancient Rome, known from the last century of the Republic and under the early Empire. The most distinguished of the Haterii was Quintus Haterius, a senator and rhetorician in the time of Augustus and Tiberius. He was consul suffectus in 5 BC.

== Praenomina ==
The praenomina associated with the early Haterii are Quintus, Sextus, and Decimus, the former two being among the more common names in Roman history, the last somewhat more distinctive, although it tended to run in families. In later times we find Haterii named Lucius, Marcus, Titus, and Tiberius.

== Branches and cognomina ==
None of the Haterii of the Republic are mentioned with a surname, but Agrippa and Antoninus are found in Imperial times. They do not seem to represent distinct branches of the family, as Decimus Haterius Agrippa was the son of the senator Quintus Haterius; if his father also bore the cognomen, it is not found in surviving records. Quintus Haterius Antoninus was probably the son of Agrippa. Valerius Maximus, who wrote during the age of Tiberius, relates an anecdote concerning a certain Haterius Rufus, but without sufficient information to guess when he lived. In the second century, we find the surnames Summus, Nepos, and Saturninus.

== Members ==
This list includes abbreviated praenomina. For an explanation of this practice, see filiation.

- Haterius or Aterius was a jurist, probably in the time of Cicero, who mentions him in one of his letters.
- Haterius, a victim of the proscriptions of the triumvirs in 43 BC. He was betrayed by one of his slaves, who was rewarded with his freedom; but when the freedman insulted the dead man's sons, and outbid them for his estate, the triumvirs acceded to popular outrage, and reduced him to servility again.
- Quintus Haterius, a rhetorician in the age of Augustus and Tiberius, known for his rapid, inventive, and sometimes reckless style, and "archaic" language hearkening back to the age of Cicero. He was consul suffectus in 5 BC, and a member of the Roman Senate, in which he wasted his talents in flattery of Tiberius and his family.
- Sextus Haterius Q. f., a son of the orator. Seneca the Elder describes a speech of his father's, in which the elder Haterius was reduced to tears when speaking of his son, giving his argument a great emotional appeal.
- Decimus Haterius Q. f. Agrippa, a son of the orator, and neighbor of Germanicus. Agrippa was tribune of the plebs in AD 15, praetor in 17, and consul in 22. He was described as a man of poor moral character, and ten years after his consulship he is said to have been plotting the downfall of various men.
- Quintus Haterius (D. f. Q. n.) Antoninus, probably the son of Decimus Haterius Agrippa, was consul in AD 53. After dissipating his inheritance, he became dependent on Nero for his support. He may be the same Quintus Haterius described as a legacy-hunter by Seneca, although Haterius the senator might have been intended.
- Haterius Rufus, an eques, who dreamed one night that he was slain by a Retiarius. The following day, while attending gladiatorial combat in the theatre at Syracuse, he was killed by a clumsy gladiator.
- Lucius Haterius, father of Marcus Haterius Summus.
- Marcus Haterius L. f. Summus, a duumvir at Iuvavum, who helped relieve the city's grain supply, and to whom a monument was dedicated by the people of his town, probably in the first half of the second century.
- Titus Haterius Nepos, prefect of Egypt from AD 121 to 124.
- Titus Haterius Nepos, consul suffectus from April 134, succeeding the aging Lucius Julius Ursus Servianus. That the consul was a member of the Arval Brethren in 120 shows he is a separate person from the equestrian governor of Egypt.
- Tiberius Haterius Saturninus, consul suffectus in AD 164, and possibly son of the consul of 134.

== See also ==
- List of Roman gentes

== Bibliography ==
- Marcus Tullius Cicero, Epistulae ad Familiares (Letters to Friends).
- Valerius Maximus, Factorum ac Dictorum Memorabilium (Memorable Facts and Sayings).
- Appianus Alexandrinus (Appian), Bellum Civile (The Civil War).
- Lucius Annaeus Seneca (Seneca the Elder), Controversiae, Suasoriae.
- Lucius Annaeus Seneca (Seneca the Younger), Epistulae Morales ad Lucilium, De Beneficiis.
- Publius Cornelius Tacitus, Annales.
- Gaius Suetonius Tranquillus, De Vita Caesarum (Lives of the Caesars, or The Twelve Caesars).
- Eusebius of Caesarea, Chronicon.
- Eusebius Sophronius Hieronymus (St. Jerome) (trans.), Epiphanii Epistola ad Pammachium adversus Errorem Joannem Hierosolytitanum (Epiphanius' Letter to Pammachius against the Error of John of Jerusalem).
- Dictionary of Greek and Roman Biography and Mythology, William Smith, ed., Little, Brown and Company, Boston (1849).
- Mary Rothes Margaret Tyssen-Amherst (Lady Amherst of Hackney), A Sketch of Egyptian History from the Earliest Times to the Present Day, Methuen & Co., London (1904).
- Timothy Venning, A Chronology of the Roman Empire, Bloomsbury Publishing (2010).
