= Evocati Augusti =

The evocati augusti were soldiers of the Praetorian Guard who had obtained an honorable discharge after serving for their time and chose to re-enlist.

== Rank ==
Due to being evocati, soldiers who had re-enlisted after serving their 16 years, of the Praetorian Guard, they were the only evocati allowed to use the adjective of "imperial" (augusti). Unlike the regular evocati, it appears that evocati augusti were hand-picked by the Emperor, rather than it being open for all. Many evocati augusti went on to be centurions in the regular legions, and beyond.
