= Sergius Octavius Laenas Pontianus =

Roman senator

Marcus Sergius or Servius Octavius Laenas Pontianus was a Roman politician of the early second century. He served as consul in AD 131, alongside Marcus Antonius Rufinus, during the reign of Hadrian.

== Name ==
Pontianus is not mentioned in ancient writers, and although his name occurs in a number of inscriptions, his precise nomenclature is uncertain. His praenomen is given as Marcus in an inscription from Samothrace, but in all other inscriptions he is either Servius or Sergius. Servius could be either a praenomen or a nomen gentilicium; both were widespread, but not particularly common. The gentile name Sergius was better known, and frequently substituted for Servius in inscriptions; this may explain why several inscriptions record Pontianus' name using the standard abbreviation for Servius, while in others it was apparently written Sergius. However, the abbreviation could be used for the gentile name Servius as well as the praenomen; and further complicating matters, in imperial times it was not uncommon for members of the Roman aristocracy to possess part or all of two or more complete nomenclatures. Thus, it is entirely possible for Pontianus to have been named Marcus Sergius Octavius, Marcus Servius Octavius, Sergius Octavius, or Servius Octavius, in which Marcus, Servius, or both could be praenomina.

A small amount of epigraphic evidence weighs in favour of Sergius in connection with the Octavia gens, which regularly used the praenomen Marcus, but not Servius. A second-century inscription from Vienna in Gallia Narbonensis mentions a Marcus Sergius Octavius, who dedicated a grave for his mother, Vennonia Iarilla; but given the location and his mother's name, it is doubtful whether he is the same man. An undated inscription from Rome mentions a boy, Sergius Octavius Caricus, buried by his father, who is not named. But perhaps the best indication of whether Pontianus inherited the name Servius or Sergius comes from the tomb of Nerva's mother, apparently Pontianus' great-aunt: according to the inscription, her name was "Sergia Plautilla", and she was the daughter of a Laenas, Pontianus' proavus.

== Imperial connections ==
Pontianus was probably born in the late first century to an obscure Octavius Laenas; the surname Pontianus suggests that his mother may have been named Pontia. Because so little is known of his life, his historical significance is based less on his consulship, which seems to have been uneventful, and more on his relationship to Nerva, as well as his presumed descent from Tiberius. Nerva's mother, Sergia Plautilla, was a sister of Pontianus' grandfather, and both were children of Gaius Octavius Laenas, consul in AD 33, making Pontianus the emperor's first cousin once removed.

Besides the inscriptions mentioning his consulship, Pontianus is named on a monument that he had built at Tusculum in memory of his grandmother, Rubellia Bassa, the daughter of Gaius Rubellius Blandus. Blandus' only attested wife is Julia Livia, who was the daughter of Drusus Julius Caesar, and granddaughter of the emperor Tiberius. However, at the time of their marriage in AD 33, Blandus was somewhat older than Julia, having been born perhaps around 25 BC, and it is quite possible that he had been married before, although no previous wife is known. A fistula aquaria, or lead water pipe, found at Rome and bearing the name of Rubellia Bassa, has been dated to the beginning of the second century. This appears to indicate that Bassa reached an advanced age, and tends to place her birth within the years of Blandus' marriage to Julia.

Another lead pipe has been unearthed, bearing the name of Sergius Rubellius Plautus, and predating the pipe of Rubellia Bassa. The artifact has been tentatively attributed to Bassa's brother Rubellius Plautus. Ronald Syme notes that the gentilicium Sergius, inherited through a cognatic line (a paternal grandmother), is mirrored in the praenomen of Pontianus. In fact, he agrees with Edmund Groag that Bassa's husband (of the Octavii Laenates) and her father were maternal cousins via the gens Sergia. (Note: The implication is that Blandus was also related to Nerva.) Furthermore, the cognomen Bassa may be explained by an earlier connection between the Rubellii and a branch of another Tiburtine gens, the Caesii Bassi, considering that in AD 29 a relative of Blandus, Rubellius Geminus, may have adopted the short-lived Caesianus, whom Syme supposes to have been his wife's nephew, and the son of a Titus Caesius.

== Career ==
Pontianus was consul for the first four months of AD 131, alongside Marcus Antonius Rufinus, about midway through the reign of Hadrian. The emperor was away from Rome, visiting Egypt during their consulship, which seems to have been uneventful. Although the consulship remained the chief executive magistracy, under the authority of the emperors, much of its significance—and the reason why several different pairs of consuls shared the office each year—was to prepare able administrators to hold provincial governorships and other important positions throughout the empire. But while Pontianus probably held a variety of magistracies and other appointments before and after the consulship, none of the inscriptions mentioning him give any details of his career, except that he seems to have been a member of the College of Pontiffs.

== See also ==
- Octavia gens

== Footnotes ==
Political offices
Preceded by Cassius Agrippa; Tiberius Claudius Quartinus as suffect consuls	Roman consul 131 with Marcus Antonius Rufinus	Succeeded by Lucius Fabius Gallus; Quintus Fabius Julianus as suffect consuls
