= Marcus Pompeius Macrinus Neos Theophanes =

2nd century Roman senator and suffect consul

Marcus Pompeius Macrinus Neos Theophanes was a Roman senator of the second century who held several imperial appointments. He was suffect consul during the nundinium of September to December 115 with Titus Vibius Varus as his colleague. Older writers like Ronald Syme had dated his career some fifteen years earlier, but subsequent research confirmed a later date. Macrinus is primarily known from inscriptions.

Macrinus, a native of Mytilene, was a descendant of one of the more famous inhabitants of the island of Lesbos, Theophanes of Mytilene; this was the origin of his cognomen Neos Theophanes, or "The New Theophanes". The descendants of the original Theophanes had fallen into the disfavor of the emperor Tiberius, and in the year 33 AD many were forced to commit suicide or driven into exile.

== Career ==
An inscription, now preserved in the Museum of Mytilene, provides details of Macrinus' cursus honorum. The earliest office mentioned in this inscription was the quaestor, which he is said to have served in Bithynia and Pontus; Werner Eck dates his quaestorship to 98/100. Upon completion of this traditional Republican magistracy Macrinus would be enrolled in the Senate. This was followed by the other Republican magistracies, plebeian tribune and praetor.

After stepping down from the office of praetor, Macrinus received a series of imperial appointments. First was procurator of the Via Latina for a period of about two years. This was followed with a commission as legatus legionis or commander of Legio VI Victrix, which was stationed at Novaesium (modern Neuss) on the Rhine frontier, which he held for about three years. After this he served as governor of the imperial province of Cilicia; Eck dates Macrinus' tenure in this province from 110 to 113. Macrinus held one more office -- proconsular governor of Sicily in 113/114 -- before he acceded to the consulate. Either during his tenure or after he stepped down from the consulate, he was admitted to the Quindecimviri sacris faciundis, a collegium entrusted to care for the Sibylline Books. There is evidence for only one consular office for Macrinus, proconsular of Africa, dated by Eck to 130/131.

== Descendants ==
Although the name of his wife has not yet been recovered, Macrinus is thought to have a descendant, Marcus Pompeius Macrinus, ordinary consul in 164. Another may be Pompeia Agrippinilla, the wife of Marcus Gavius Squilla Gallicanus, ordinary consul in 150.

Political offices
Preceded by Lucius Julius Frugi, and Publius Juventius Celsus Titus Aufidius Hoenius Severianus as suffect consuls	Suffect consul of the Roman Empire; 115 with Titus Vibius Varus	Succeeded by Lucius Fundanius Lamia Aelianus, and Sextus Carminius Vetus as ordinary consuls
