= Aulus Egrilius Plarianus =

2nd century Roman senator

Aulus Egrilius Plarianus, also known as Aulus Egrilius Plarianus Pater, was a Roman senator, who flourished during the reign of Hadrian. He was suffect consul in the nundinium of October to December 128 with Quintus Planius Sardus Varius Ambibulus as his colleague; as the first of his family to accede to the consulate, he is a homo novus. Plarianus is known entirely from inscriptions.

Plarianus came from a prominent family of Ostia, known from numerous inscriptions recovered from that port city of Rome. His father was Aulus Egrilius Rufus, a prominent decurion of Ostia, attested as duovir and flamen Romae et Augusti; his mother was Plaria Q.f. Vera. Through his mother's family, the Plarii, Plarianus could trace a connection with the Senatorial Acilii Glabriones: Manius Acilius Glabrio, consul in 91, had married Arria L.f. Plaria Vera Priscilla, another member of the Plarii. Plarianus had at least one brother, Marcus Acilius Priscus Egrilius Plarianus.

His cursus honorum is not completely known. Plarianus is attested as having been prefectus of the aerarium Saturni from the year 123 to 125, when his brother succeeded him in that role. Plarianus then entered the consulate. Both brothers are attested as two of the numerous patrons of Ostia.

Although the name of his wife has not yet been discovered, Plarianus is known to have had one son, also named Aulus Egrilius Plarianus, who was prefectus of the aerarium militare, but did not advance to the consulate for unknown reasons.

Political offices
Preceded by Lucius Valerius Flaccus; Marcus Junius Homullus as suffecti	Roman consul 128 (suffect) with Quintus Planius Sardus Varius Ambibulus	Succeeded by Publius Juventius Celsus II; Lucius Neratius Marcellus II as ordinary consuls
