= Lucius Neratius Marcellus =

Late 1st century/early 2nd century Roman military officer, senator and consul

Consul of the Roman Empire
- In office 13 January 95 – April 95 Serving with Titus Flavius Clemens
- Preceded by: Domitian with Titus Flavius Clemens
- Succeeded by: Aulus Bucius Lappius Maximus with Publius Ducenius Verus
- In office January 129 – February 129 Serving with Publius Juventius Celsus Titus Aufidius Hoenius Severianus
- Preceded by: Aulus Egrilius Plarianus with Q. [...]
- Succeeded by: Quintus Julius Balbus

Personal details
- Born: Unknown
- Died: Unknown (After 129 AD)
- Spouse(s): Corellia Hispulla; Domitia Vettilla

Military service
- Allegiance: Roman Empire
- Commands: Military tribune of Legio XII Fulminata; Governor of Britannia

Lucius Neratius Marcellus (fl. 1st century – 2nd century AD) was an imperial Roman military officer and senator who held a number of posts in the Emperor's service. Marcellus was elected consul twice, first under Domitian in 95 AD and again under Hadrian in 129. His life provides several examples of how patronage operated in early Imperial Rome.

He was a consul in 95 AD, succeeding the Emperor Domitian, and again in 129. He served as a military tribune with the Legio XII Fulminata. He is the first person attested to have held the position of recorder of the minutes of the Senate. He was Governor of Britannia from 101 to 104. This was a period when the under-garrisoned province was under pressure from restless tribes. Marcellus supervised a stabilization of the situation which included a withdrawal from the future site of Antonine Wall to what was later to become the line of Hadrian's Wall.

== Early life ==
The origins of the gens Neratia lie in the Italian town of Saepinum, located in Samnium. Olli Salomies , in his study of Imperial Roman nomenclature, has established that while Marcellus was the brother of the jurist Lucius Neratius Priscus, and thus the natural child of Lucius Neratius Priscus, he had been adopted by his uncle Marcus Hirrius Fronto Neratius Pansa, consul in 73 or 74, who was childless.

It has been argued that Marcellus was married twice. One wife is attested for Marcellus on inscriptions recovered from Saepinum she erected in his honor, Domitia Vettilla, the daughter of Lucius Domitius Apollinaris, suffect consul in AD 97. However, it has been argued that Marcellus had married Corellia Hispulla, based on the existence of a son Lucius Corellius Neratius Pansa, consul of AD 122; Hispulla was the daughter of Pliny the Younger’s elderly friend Quintus Corellius Rufus, suffect consul in AD 78. Ronald Syme notes that Marcellus "need not have ... only one wife", and argues he was married first to Hispulla, then to Vettilla.

== Career until governor of Britain ==
An inscription recovered from Saepinum provides details of Marcellus' career. In his teens he was one of the tresviri monetalis, the most prestigious of the four boards that comprise the vigintiviri. Assignment to this board was usually the prerogative of patricians or favored individuals. An inscription found in Xanthos is understood by experts to indicate that he accompanied his adoptive father to the Roman province of Lycia while the older man governed it as legatus Augusti pro praetore, or imperial governor. On returning to Rome both were adlected (promoted) into the patrician class, most likely during the Roman census of 73–74. This promotion in status offered many opportunities, including being excused from holding some of the republican magistracies otherwise required to become consul.

Marcellus was then given the position of curator acta senatorum, or recorder of the minutes of the Senate. He is the first person attested to have held this position. At the age of 25 he held the republican magistracy of quaestor, being selected as one of the pair allocated to attend to the Emperor. The duties of these quaestors included reading the Emperor's speeches to the Senate. This was followed by his admission to the collegia of the Salius Palatinus, a priestly order tracing its roots back to the Roman Kingdom. Marcellus' service to the Emperor resumed with a commission as a tribunus laticlavius with the Legio XII Fulminata which was part of an expeditionary force led by his adoptive father Neratius Pansa in Cappadocia. This expedition is thought to have taken place in 75 and 76.

Due to his promotion to the patrician class, Marcellus was excused from holding any commands or offices between the praetorship and his appointment as suffect consul in AD 95, replacing the emperor Domitian on the Ides of January. Ronald Syme describes being the suffect to replace the emperor as a "high distinction, and close to being consul ordinarius". Marcellus served as curator aquarum urbis (supervisor of the city's aqueducts) between his consulship and his appointment as the legatus Augusti pro praetore of Roman Britain. He certainly held the office before 103, when his governorship is attested by a military diploma.

== Britain and after ==
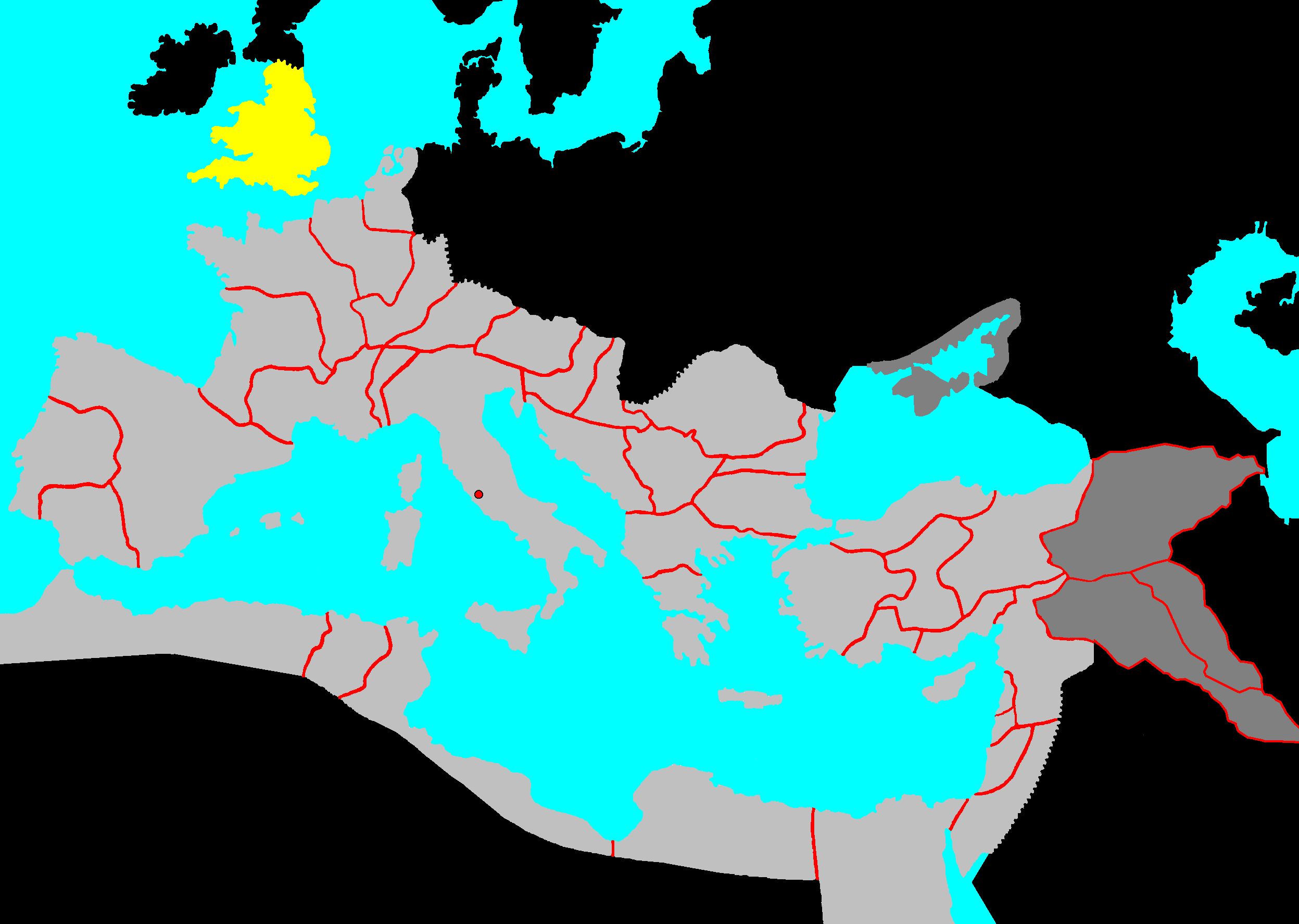
Britannia (yellow), within the Roman Empire

Marcellus was Governor of Britannia from 101 to 104. At about this time the Roman army was hard pressed to hold the territory Agricola had conquered a generation before. Legio II Adiutrix had been withdrawn to the Danube in AD 92 with three cohorts of Batavian auxiliaries. Emperor Trajan, needing reinforcements for his First Dacian War, had called for vexillations (detachments) from the army in Britain. The natives took advantage of the understrength garrison: excavations at Newstead and elsewhere show signs of destruction by fire. Although the Romans often burnt what was not worth salvaging when they evacuated a fort, excavations also revealed human remains and immense quantities of equipment, including damaged armour, at Newstead. This has been taken as clear evidence of hostile action. The frontier was withdrawn from the Antonine Wall to the line of the Stanegate, the future Hadrian's Wall. Marcellus certainly managed at least a portion of this major reorganization.

Neratius Marcellus was a friend of Pliny the Younger. Although none of Pliny's letters to Marcellus have survived, one of his extant letters does mention him. Pliny had requested that Marcellus make Suetonius a tribune in Britain. When he succeeded in obtaining this favor for Suetonius, the latter eventually declined the post, which Pliny then transferred to a relative of Suetonius' in his place. This story indicates that Marcellus was able to make military appointments easily through the network of patronage, apparently without consulting the army.

Another illustration of Marcellus' role in the network of patronage of his time is a draft of a letter recovered from the Roman fort at Vindolanda. The commander of the Ninth Cohort of Batavians stationed there, Flavius Cerialis, writes to his friend Crispinus about meeting with governor Marcellus. The text is damaged at this point, and there have been several theories proposed by modern historians as to the purpose of this communication. Anthony Birley suggested Cerialis was asking Crispinus to intercede on his behalf for a promotion or transfer; M. P. Speidel and R. Seider suggest this was an example of litterae commendaticiae, or a letter introducing himself to Crispinus; in their edition of the letter, Alan K. Bowman and J. David Thomas offer a more prosaic interpretation: "The writer is asking Crispinus to... make his military service pleasant by putting him on good terms with as many influential people as possible."

The next record of Neratius Marcellus comes decades after he returned from Britain, when he was elected consul ordinarius in AD 129, serving alongside Publius Juventius Celsus Titus Aufidius Hoenius Severianus. Observing that the emperor Hadrian relied on his brother for advice, Birley believes that Marcellus was "on familiar terms" with Hadrian, which may be the reason for the signal honour of a second consulship. However, Birley then notes that "it may be that he came to a sad end soon afterwards, for among Hadrian's close friends... the author of the Historia Augusta lists a Marcellus, forced to suicide by the emperor."

Political offices
| Preceded by Domitian XVII, and Titus Flavius Clemens as Ordinary consuls | Suffect Consul of the Roman Empire; 95 with Titus Flavius Clemens | Succeeded by Aulus Bucius Lappius Maximus II; Publius Ducenius Verus as Suffect consuls |
| Preceded by Aulus Egrilius Plarianus, and Q. [...] as suffect consuls | Consul of the Roman Empire; 129 with Publius Juventius Celsus Titus Aufidius Hoenius Severianus II | Succeeded by Quintus Julius Balbus as suffect consul |
| Preceded by Titus Avidius Quietus | Roman governors of Britain c. 101–104 | Succeeded by Unknown, then Marcus Atilius Bradua |
