= Lucius Aninius Sextius Florentinus =

2nd century Roman senator and official

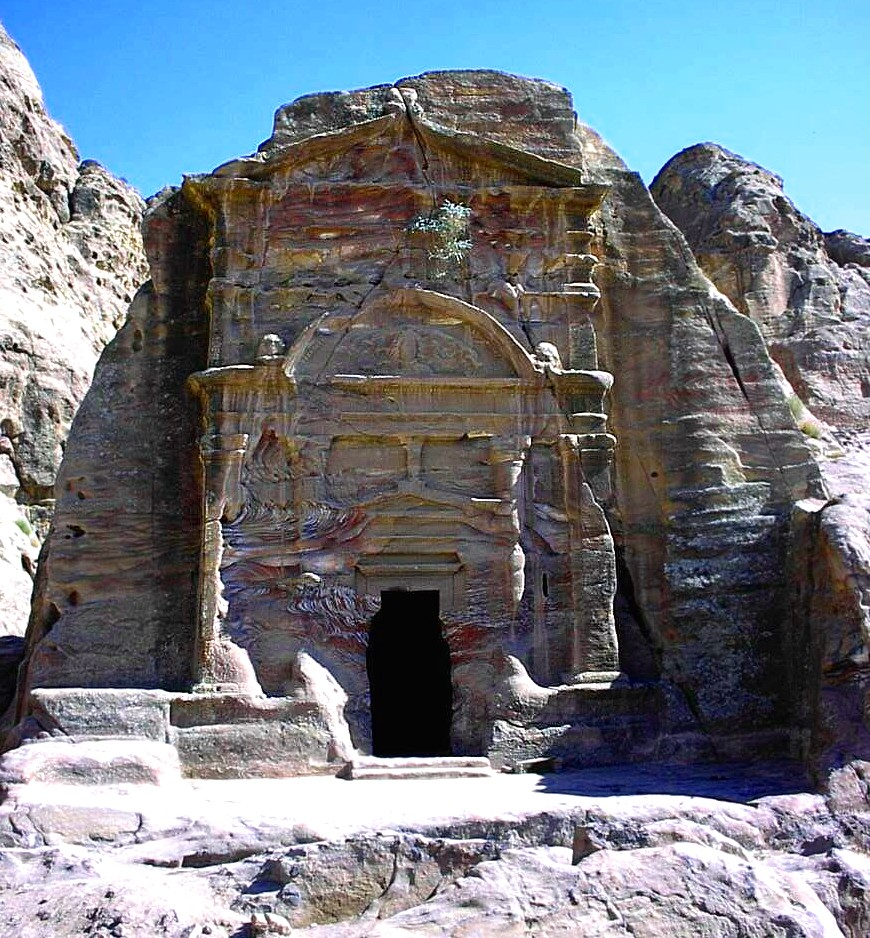
Tomb of Sextius Florentinus

Lucius Aninius Sextius Florentinus (died between 127 and 130) was a Roman senator, who held a number of imperial appointments during the reigns of Trajan and Hadrian. He died while governing Roman Arabia; his unnamed son had a tomb prepared for him at Petra, which still stands.

There is some uncertainty about his praenomen. While a papyrus text recovered from the Cave of Letters in the Judean Desert mentioning him reports it as Titus, the inscription on his tomb is said to report it as Lucius.

== Career ==
His tombstone provides us the details of his cursus honorum. The first recorded office Florentinus held was as one of the tresviri monetalis, the most prestigious of the four boards that comprise the vigintiviri; assignment to this board was usually allocated to patricians or favored individuals. This was followed by a commission as military tribune in Legio I Minervia; Anthony Birley dates this commission to about the year 110. He then was elected quaestor, and Florentinus executed this traditional Republican magistracy in Achaea. Upon completion of this traditional Republican magistracy Florentinus would be enrolled in the Senate.

Here Birley notes his surprise that Florentinus served as quaestor in Achaea, instead of as quaestor as an adjunct to the emperor, moreover he then held the post of plebeian tribune instead of curule aedile. "Perhaps the patronage which had secured him a start as a monetalis was no longer available," Birley suggests.

Although the inscription omits any mention that Florentinus was praetor, it can be safely assumed he had, for his next three offices required that magistracy. First Florentinus was commissioned legatus legionis or commander of Legio IX Hispana, which presumably was still stationed in Roman Britain at the time, although it may have been withdrawn from that province by that point; Birley dates his command of this legion "to the first few years of the reign of Hadrian." Next the sortition rewarded him with the governorship of the public province of Gallia Narbonensis. The date he held this office is less certain: Werner Eck dates it to the term 123/124, while Birley dates it to 124/125. His final posting was in Roman Arabia, where the above-mentioned papyrus attests he was in office on 2 December 127. The next known governor of Roman Arabia, Titus Haterius Nepos, is attested as being in office 17 November 130, so we can surmise that between those two dates Florentinus died of unknown causes.
