= Evocatus =

Class of voluntarily reenlisted soldier in the Ancient Roman army

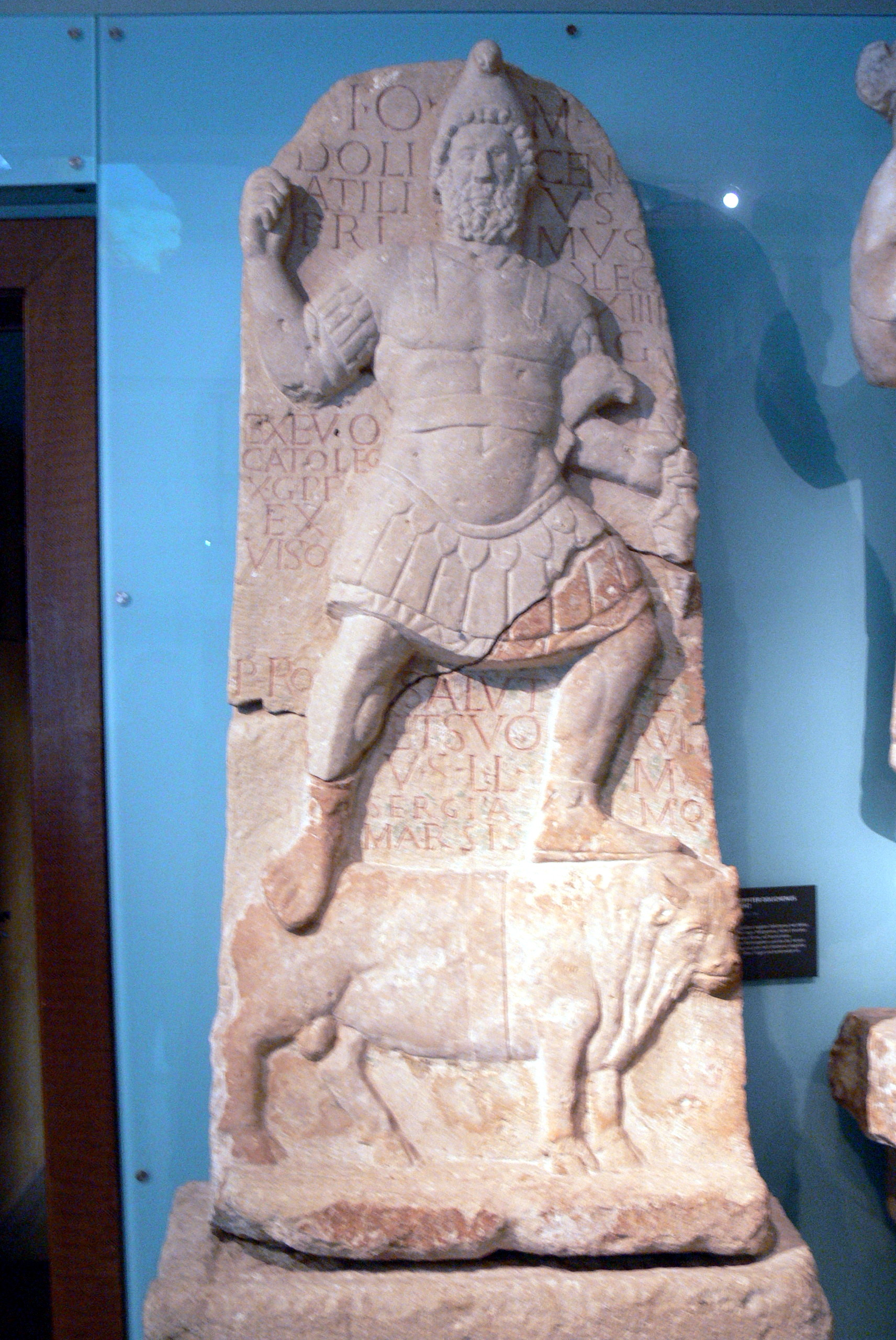
Statue of Jupiter Dolichenus from Carnuntum, erected by Atilius Primus, an evocatus of the Legio XIV Gemina. The dative form ēvocātō is visible at left.

An evocatus (pl.: evocati) was a soldier in the Ancient Roman army who had served out his time and obtained an honorable discharge (honesta missio) but had voluntarily enlisted again at the invitation of the consul or other commander.

== Significance and tasks ==
There always existed a considerable number of evocati in every army of importance, and when the general was a favorite among the soldiers, the number of veterans who joined his standard naturally increased. The evocati were officially released, like the vexillarii, from common military duties such as fortifying the camp and making roads.

== Ranking ==
Evocati held a higher rank in the army than common legionary soldiers and are sometimes written of in conjunction with the equites Romani, and sometimes classed with the centurions. Evocati appear to have been frequently promoted to the rank of centurion and were customarily entitled to bear the vine staff and discipline fellow soldiers. Thus, Pompey induced a great many of the veterans who had served under him in former years to join his standard at the outbreak of the civil war, with the promise of rewards and the command of centuries. Not all evocati could, however, have held the rank of centurion, nor could they belong to certain cohorts in the army. Cicero speaks of a Praefectus evocatorum, an officer in charge of the evocati.

== Evocati Augusti ==
The name evocati was also applied to a select body of young men of the equestrian order who were appointed by Emperor Domitian to guard his bedchamber. This body is supposed by some writers to have existed under succeeding emperors and to have been the same as that consisting of those known as evocati augusti.
