= Quintus Rammius Martialis =

Roman state official

Quintus Rammius Martialis was a Roman eques who held at least two important appointments during the reign of the emperors Trajan and Hadrian. His origins and family are not explicitly documented; Anthony Birley guesses he might be a native of Gallia Narbonensis, noting that a freedman Q. Rammius Q.l. Fronto is attested there.

Martialis is attested as Praefectus vigilum, or commander of the vigiles or the night watch of Rome by two inscriptions. The earlier dates to 111. The later dates to 113, and mentions C. Maesius Tertius as his sub-prefect.

Several years later he is attested as prefect or governor of Roman Egypt from November 117 to May 119. His primary concern as governor of Egypt was to safeguard the harvest and delivery of grain to the populace of Rome, but surviving letters from his administration show his responsibilities extended further. One concerns an edict of Hadrian that he transmitted to the garrison of Egypt which included the legions III Cyrenaica and XXII Deiotariana. This edict relaxed the rule forbidding soldiers from marrying, which made their children illegitimate; as a result of Hadrian's edict children of soldiers could now be heirs of their fathers. Another concerned the petition of a strategos who requested 60 days' leave to put his affairs in order following the destruction of the Kitos War. Rammius Martilis was also honored while governor by an inscription found at Alexandria, erected by a soldier named A. Rutilius Cilo.

Political offices
Preceded by Marcus Rutilius Lupus	Prefect of Egypt; 117–119	Succeeded by Titus Haterius Nepos
