= Neratia gens =

Ancient Roman family

The gens Neratia or Naeratia was a plebeian family at ancient Rome, some of whom subsequently became patricians. The first of the gens to appear in history occur in the time of Augustus, but they did not rise to prominence until the time of Vespasian, when Marcus Neratius Pansa became the first to obtain the consulship. The Neratii married into the Roman imperial family in the fourth century.

== Origin ==
The nomen Neratius is classified by Chase with a group of names, ending in -atius, either because they were derived from cognomina ending in -as or -atis, indicating cognomina derived from place names, or from passive participles ending in -atus.

== Members ==
This list includes abbreviated praenomina. For an explanation of this practice, see filiation.

=== Neratii Pansae et Prisci ===
- Marcus Hirrius Fronto Neratius Pansa, probably the adoptive father of Marcellus, was consul suffectus about AD 75. He had been governor of Lycia, and was probably made a patrician in 73 or 74; he passed this status to Marcellus.
- Lucius Neratius Priscus, probably the father of the jurist Priscus, and the natural father of Marcellus, was consul suffectus in AD 87.
- (Marcus Hirrius) Lucius Neratius M. f. Marcellus, consul suffectus in AD 95, and afterward governor of Britain, was an influential man in the court of Trajan. He was consul ordinarius in 129.
- Lucius Neratius L. f. Priscus, a jurist who flourished during the reigns of Trajan and Hadrian. He wrote several books on the law, from which a number of excerpts are found in the Digest. He was consul suffectus in AD 97. Trajan is said to have considered him a possible successor.
- Lucius Corellius L. f. M. n. Neratius Pansa, consul in AD 122, was the son of Marcellus and his first wife, Corellia Hispulla.
- Lucius Neratius L. f. L. n. Priscus, son of the jurist Priscus, was consul suffectus in an uncertain year.
- Neratia L. f. L. n. Marullina, daughter of the jurist Priscus, married Gaius Fufidius Atticus, and was the mother of Gaius Neratius Fufidius Annianus, Atticus, and Priscus.
- Gaius Neratius Fufidius C. f. Annianus.
- Gaius Neratius Fufidius C. f. Atticus.
- Gaius Neratius Fufidius C. f. Priscus.
- Neratia L. f. L. n. Anteia Rufina Naevia Deciana, granddaughter of the jurist Priscus. A monument in her name, dating from the middle portion of the second century, was decreed by the decurions of Saepinum in Samnium.

=== Neratii Proculi ===
- Lucius Neratius C. f. C. n. Proculus, (Note: His nephew's name features an unusual four-generation filiation, telling us that Proculus' great-grandfather was also named Gaius.) a Roman senator in the time of Antoninus Pius. He had a distinguished military career, and was consul suffectus, but the year is uncertain.
- Neratia C. f. C. n. Procilla, married Gaius Betitius Pietas, and was the mother of Gaius Neratius Proculus Betitius Pius Maximillianus.
- Gaius Neratius Proculus Betitius C. f. C. n. Pius Maximillianus.

=== Others ===
- Neratia, the wife of Marcus Antistius Labeo, a jurist in the time of Augustus.
- Quintus Neratius Proxsimus, a colonist at Lindum Colonia in Britain. His rare nomen suggests that he may have received Roman citizenship from Lucius Neratius Marcellus, the governor of Britain at the end of the first century.
- Neratia Aemiliana.
- Neratius Gallus.
- Neratius Scopius.
- Neratius Cerealis, urban prefect of Rome in 352–353 AD and consul in 358.
- (Neratia) Galla, sister of Cerealis, and wife of Julius Constantius, brother of the emperor Constantine, whom she predeceased. She was the mother of Constantius Gallus.

== See also ==
- List of Roman gentes

== Bibliography ==
- Titus Livius (Livy), Ab Urbe Condita (History of Rome).
- Dionysius of Halicarnassus, Romaike Archaiologia.
- Gaius Plinius Caecilius Secundus (Pliny the Younger), Epistulae (Letters).
- Aulus Gellius, Noctes Atticae (Attic Nights).
- Lucius Cassius Dio Cocceianus (Cassius Dio), Roman History.
- Aelius Lampridius, Aelius Spartianus, Flavius Vopiscus, Julius Capitolinus, Trebellius Pollio, and Vulcatius Gallicanus, Historia Augusta (Augustan History).
- Digesta seu Pandectae (The Digest).
- Guilielmus Grotius, De Vitae Jurisconsultorum (Lives of the Jurists), Felix Lopez, Lugdunum Batavorum (1690).
- Sigmund Wilhelm Zimmern, Geschichte des Römischen Privatrechts bis Justinian (History of Roman Private Law to Justinian), J. C. B. Mohr, Heidelberg (1826).
- Georg Friedrich Puchta, Cursus der Institutionen (Course of the Institutions), Breitkopf und Härtel, Leipzig (1841–1847).
- Dictionary of Greek and Roman Biography and Mythology, William Smith, ed., Little, Brown and Company, Boston (1849).
- Theodor Mommsen et alii, Corpus Inscriptionum Latinarum (The Body of Latin Inscriptions, abbreviated CIL), Berlin-Brandenburgische Akademie der Wissenschaften (1853–present).
- George Davis Chase, "The Origin of Roman Praenomina", in Harvard Studies in Classical Philology, vol. VIII (1897).
- Paul von Rohden, Elimar Klebs, & Hermann Dessau, Prosopographia Imperii Romani (The Prosopography of the Roman Empire, abbreviated PIR), Berlin (1898).
- T. Robert S. Broughton, The Magistrates of the Roman Republic, American Philological Association (1952).
- Anthony R. Birley, The Roman Government of Britain, Oxford University Press (2005).
- Jones, A.H.M.; J.R. Martindale & J. Morris (1971–1992). Prosopography of the Later Roman Empire. Cambridge University Press. ISBN 0-521-07233-6.
