= Titus Vibius Varus (consul 115) =

2nd century Roman senator and consul suffect

Titus Vibius Varus was a Roman senator, who was active during the reign of Trajan. He was suffect consul in the nundinium of September to December 115 as the colleague of Marcus Pompeius Macrinus Neos Theophanes. He is known entirely from inscriptions.

Bernard Remy suggests that his family came from Brixia in Istria, or Region X of Italy. Remy also identifies Varus as the father of Titus Vibius Varus, ordinary consul in 134. Besides the consulate, Varus is known to have held one office, governor of the public province of Creta et Cyrenaica during the reign of Trajan.

Political offices
Preceded by Lucius Julius Frugi, and Publius Juventius Celsus Titus Aufidius Hoenius Severianus as suffect consuls	Suffect consul of the Roman Empire; 115 with Marcus Pompeius Macrinus Neos Theophanes	Succeeded by Lucius Fundanius Lamia Aelianus, and Sextus Carminius Vetus as ordinary consuls
