= Lucius Corellius Neratius Pansa =

2nd century Roman senator and consul

Lucius Corellius Neratius Pansa was a Roman senator, who was active during the reign of Hadrian. He was ordinary consul in AD 122 as the colleague of Manius Acilius Aviola. Other than holding the office of consul, Pansa is only known for being the subject of a letter of Pliny the Younger.

Pansa was a member of the gens Neratia, which could boast of consuls before Pansa. Ronald Syme has argued that he was the son of Lucius Neratius Marcellus, consul in 95 and again in 129, and his first wife Corellia Hispulla, the daughter of Quintus Corellius Rufus, suffect consul in 78. An alimentary table dated to 101 listing estates near Beneventum (modern Benevento) records land owned by one Neratius Corellius and Neratius Marcellus in close connection, further strengthening Syme's argument.

In the letter Pliny wrote to Hispulla, he remarks how Pansa will grow up to be like his grandfather in fame and character, then states that the time has come now to send the boy off to school and recommends one Julius Genitor to teach him rhetoric.

Political offices
Preceded by Marcus Statorius Secundus then unknown, and Lucius Sempronius Merula Auspicatus then unknown as suffect consuls	Consul of the Roman Empire; 122 with Manius Acilius Aviola	Succeeded by Tiberius Julius Candidus Capito, and Lucius Vitrasius Flamininus as suffect consuls
