= Honesta missio =

Roman Empire honorable discharge from military service

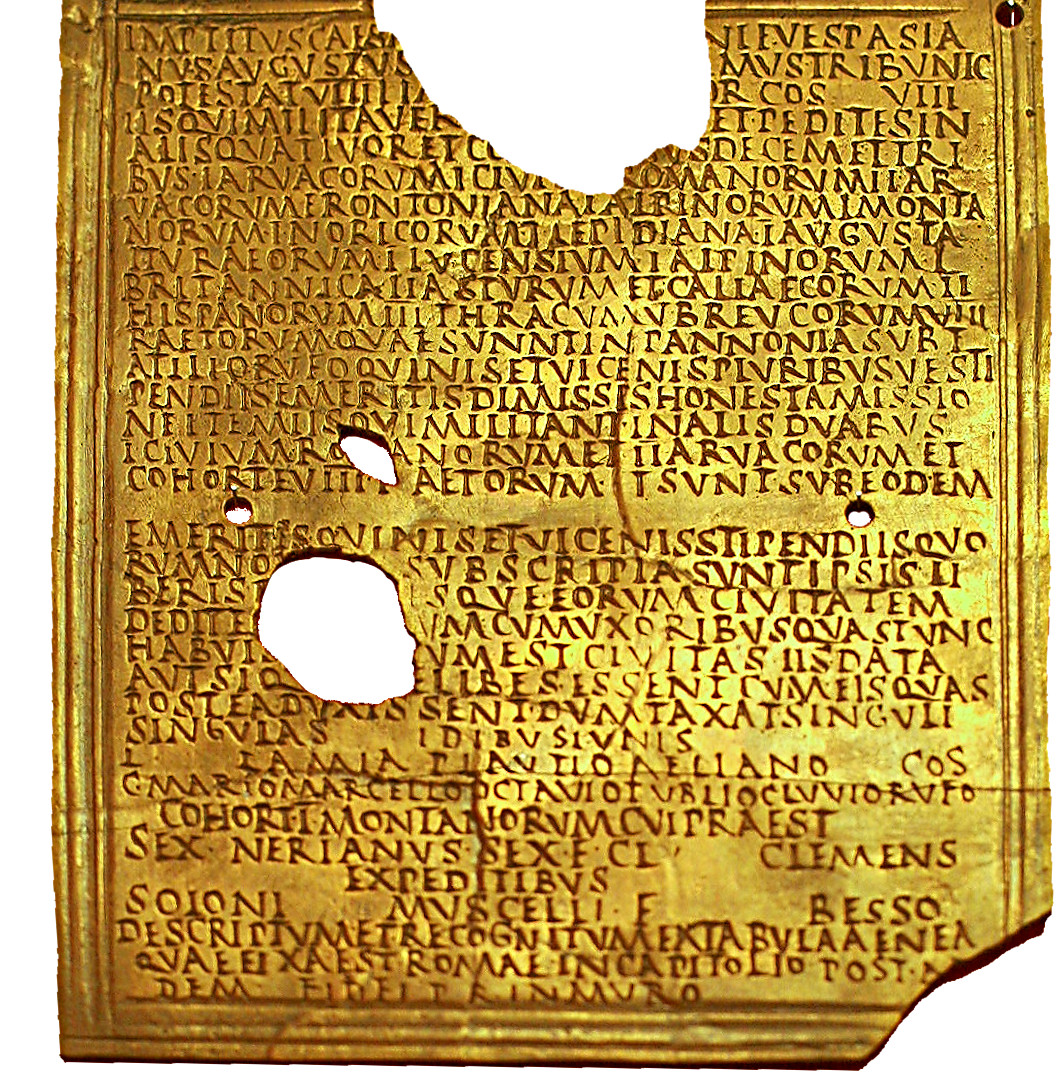
Honesta missio certificate issued under the emperor Titus

The honesta missio was the honorable discharge from the military service in the Roman Empire. The status conveyed particular privileges (praemia militiae). Among other things, an honorably discharged legionary was paid discharge money from a treasury established by Augustus, the aerarium militare, which amounted to 12,000 sesterces for the common soldier and around 600,000 sesterces for the primus pilus until the Principate of Caracalla.

== Specific privileges ==
The honorably discharged legionary also presumably received a certificate after a service of approximately 20 to 26 years. Only a few, called tabulae honestae missionis, have been preserved, presumably because most were made of ephemeral materials. Emperor Augustus began the practice of granting retired soldiers a benefit known as the missio nummaria which gave soldiers financial compensation. Legionaries could earn the equivalent of 10 to 13 years of their wages from this. Another benefit was a land grant known as the missio agraria.

Auxiliary soldiers, called peregrini (non-Roman citizens of the Empire), usually received Roman citizenship and conubium (permission to marry) for themselves and their descendants along with the honesta missio. The imperial order about these grants were often later documented on bronze military certificates, but which were not necessarily directly related to the discharge. These orders might also include rights to cash and land, poll tax exemption for up to four people, and immunities from various duties. For example, recipients who desired to set up a business could receive a cash grant, and those desiring land could be given a sizable plot along with two oxen, cash, and 100 measures of assorted grains. These benefits would be reduced over time.

Soldiers of all branches who had received their honorable discharge after completing their regular term of service or in the case of premature discharge due to invalidity, as well as due to the imperial goodwill, were considered veterans, who were sometimes granted tax relief (privilegia veteranorum). Veterans, as honestiores, fulfilled important functions in the local civil administration of their mostly rural homes, thus contributing significantly to the stability of the empire and the Hellenization or Romanization of the areas they had subjugated. Veterans could be called back into the service of the legion as evocatus at the request of a commander, provided they agreed.

== Other types of discharge from military service ==
In addition to the honesta missio, there was also the premature discharge for health reasons (missio causaria, invalidity caused, for example, by serious injury in battle) and in dishonor (missio ignominiosa). In most cases, men discharged for health reasons were treated like honorably discharged, although the extent of the allowances granted to them was based on the length of their service.

Dishonorable discharge (missio ignominiosa) was the punishment for soldiers found guilty of serious crimes. These men were forbidden by law to live in Rome or to enter the imperial service, and they could be marked (branded or tattooed). They also enjoyed none of the rights and privileges granted to honorably discharged soldiers.

== In popular culture ==
The "gift" in Asterix and Caesar's Gift was a honesta missio.

== See also ==
- Donativum, a cash "gift" from a new emperor to secure the loyalty of troops
- Economics of the Roman army

== Bibliography ==
- Phang, Sara (2008). Roman Military Service: Ideologies of Discipline in the Late Republic and Early Principate. Cambridge University Press. ISBN 0-521-88269-9.
- Millar, Fergus (2004). Rome, the Greek World, and the East: Government, Society and Culture in the Roman Empire. University of North Carolina Press.
- Swan, Peter Michael (2004). The Augustan Succession: An Historical Commentary on Cassius Dio's Roman History Books 55–56 (9 B.C–A.D. 14). Oxford University Press.
