= Lucius Fundanius Lamia Aelianus =

2nd century Roman senator, consul and governor

- Spouse: Rupilia
- Children: Lucius Plautius Lamia Silvanus; Fundania
- Parents: Lucius Fundanius (father); Plautia (mother)

Lucius Fundanius Lamia Aelianus was a Roman senator active in the reigns of Trajan and Hadrian.

== Biography ==
=== Early life ===
Lamia Aelianus was possibly the son of the empress Domitia Longina and Lucius Aelius Lamia Plautius Aelianus or their maternal grandson through a daughter Aelia Plautia and her husband a Lucius Fundanius, son of a Lucius Fundanius. Ronald Syme identifies Lamia Aelianus as the brother of the surmised but undocumented Plautia, who was married three times, and whose children married into the Antonine dynasty.

=== Career ===
He was ordinary consul in 116 with Sextus Carminius Vetus as his colleague. He was later proconsular governor of Asia during 131 and 132.

=== Family ===
He married Rupilia, sister of Rupilia Faustina, wife of Marcus Annius Verus, three times consul, and perhaps daughter of Lucius Scribonius Libo Rupilius Frugi Bonus and wife Salonia Matidia, maternal niece of Trajan, and had two known children, a son and a daughter. Their son was Lucius Plautius Lamia Silvanus, consul in 145. Their daughter was Fundania, whose existence is inferred from the name of her daughter Annia Fundania Faustina, daughter of Marcus Annius Libo, consul in 128, and thus Libo's wife.

== See also ==
- List of Roman consuls

Political offices
| Preceded by Marcus Pompeius Macrinus Neos Theophanes, and Titus Vibius Varus as suffect consuls | Consul of the Roman Empire; AD 116 with Sextus Carminius Vetus | Succeeded by Tiberius Julius Secundus, and Marcus Egnatius Marcellinus as suffect consuls |
