= Titus Haterius Nepos (prefect of Egypt) =

2nd century Roman official and military commander

Titus Haterius Nepos was an eques who held a number of imperial Roman positions during the reigns of Trajan and Hadrian. The two most important posts were praefectus vigilum or commander of the vigiles or nightwatch, and praefectus or governor of Egypt (120-124). According to Fergus Millar, Nepos was the first eques who was promoted from regular procuratorial posts into a proper secretarial appointment.

== Career ==
Nepos' career is largely documented in an inscription from Fulginiae in Umbria; although the name of the subject is missing, it is generally accepted that this inscription applies to Nepos since Bartolomeo Borghesi first proposed the identification. The earliest appointment mentioned in this inscription was prefect or commander of an ala, from which he advanced to military tribune of an unnamed unit of auxiliary horsemen. This was followed as a censitor or census official of the Brittona Anavionensies. Although this has been located elsewhere, a letter recovered from Vindolanda places this in Roman Britain: a letter to Flavius Genialis, prefect of the cohort stationed at Vindolanda, was written by a man identified as Haterius Nepos. The date of the letter is uncertain, and can be dated at any time between 97 and 120.

Here the chronology of his life becomes strained. The next posting listed on the inscription was procurator of Roman Armenia, a province which existed between the years 114–117. However, he is attested as governor of Egypt as early as 120. Into those three years must fall the following appointments: procurator of a ludus magnus (a training school for gladiators), simultaneously procurator of the hereditates and a censibus, then a libellis, and lastly his tenure as praefectus vigilum. Either he held each of these appointments in a very brief time, or the author of the inscription got these appointments and his governorship of Armenia out of order.

While Nepos was governor, he visited the Colossi of Memnon at dawn of 18 February 121 and heard the statue sing.

His life after he stepped down as governor of Egypt is not known, beyond the certainty he was not the identically-named consul in 134.

Political offices
Preceded by Quintus Rammius Martialis	Prefect of Egypt; 120–124	Succeeded by Petronius Quadratus
