= Economics of the Roman army =

Costs of maintaining the Imperial Roman army

The economics of the Roman army concerns the costs of maintaining the Imperial Roman army and the infrastructure to support it, as well as the economic development to which the presence of long-term military bases contributed. Supply contracts with the military generated trade with producers near the base, throughout the province, and across provincial borders.

== Military burden ==
The size and growth of the Roman army of the Principate may be summarised as follows:

Roman army numbers 24–305 AD
Army corps	Tiberius; 24 AD	Hadrian c. 130 AD	S. Severus; 211 AD	Diocletian; Start 284 AD	Diocletian; Mid rule c. 300
Legions	125,000	155,000	182,000		
Auxilia	125,000	218,000	250,000		
Praetorian Guard	~~5,000	~10,000	~10,000		
Total Roman Army	255,000	383,000	442,000	350,000?	390,000

Note: Figures are based on official (not actual) unit strengths and exclude Roman navy effectives and foederati.

The Roman navy contained probably 30,000–40,000 marines, sailors, and oarsmen, of which 15,000–20,000 in the Mediterranean fleets at Misenum and Ravenna (contrary to popular belief, Roman warships of this period were not rowed by the forced labor of convicts or slaves, but by volunteer professional oarsmen) and perhaps the same again in the classis Britannica (English Channel fleet) and the fluvial flotillas on the Rhine and Danube.

Substantial numbers of irregular tribal troops (foederati) were in the paid service of the empire during the whole period: the number is unknown, but there were at least 5,500 in Britain alone around 175 AD (surrendered Sarmatian cavalry posted there by Marcus Aurelius). If this figure is multiplied by 10 to represent other frontier provinces, it is possible that there may have been 50,000–60,000 such irregulars at any given time.

At its peak under emperor Septimius Severus (r. 193–211 AD) therefore, the standing Roman military establishment may have comprised over half a million effectives.

This was a very significant burden on the Roman economy, which was pre-industrial: at least 80% of its inhabitants worked in agriculture. A very high percentage of all the revenue from taxes and rents raised by the imperial government were spent on the military: about 80% of the imperial budget in c. 150. Other sources suggest less, but not less than 60%. Military spending constituted, by one estimate, about 2.5% of the empire's GDP, which seems a tolerable burden if compared to the US, today's global superpower, which spent 3.8% of its GDP on defense in 2006 (18% of the federal budget). But the comparison is misleading. Due to modern technology, a modern economy is far more productive per capita than the Roman economy: on one estimate, the average American in 1998 was at least 73 times more economically productive, in comparable terms (i.e. in international dollars), than a Roman in the 1st century AD. Another factor to consider is that half the population was 25 or less (compare modern societies 35–40) meaning that larger portion of the population were too young and not taxpayers. Another factor is that many items of production were not taxed such as those for domestic use, clothing, buildings. Therefore, taxes (and compulsory services) to support the Roman military would have taken a much greater share of surplus per capita production i.e. surplus to the subsistence needs of producers, almost all agricultural. For the average peasant, the taxes and services he was obliged to provide to the military would have represented a significant share of his disposable surplus if situated within reasonable distance of the units. Compulsory services performed by the richer members of society helped to supply military needs (and maintain the infrastructures of cities and the empire, in effect a tax that was paid for in money or labor).

There is also a great disparity between the costs of the 4th-century army and its 2nd-century counterpart. The much lower remuneration for 4th-century soldiers is reflected in total army costs. Duncan-Jones estimates the total annual cost of the military in c. 150 AD at c. 670 million sesterces. This is 167.5 million denarii. This translates into 1.67 million aurei or 168,000 pounds of gold for an army of 387,000 all costs. This compares with Elton's estimate of 31,625 lbs. of gold for 300,000 soldiers, 47,438 lbs of gold for 450,000 and 63.250 lbs. for 600,000 base pay only. His figure is doubled when other costs are factored in. Even if the establishment was the 600,000 as estimated by A. H. M. Jones, the cost would still be only about a third that for the 2nd-century army. Such a disparity is difficult to explain. Either the imperial government was collecting far less tax than in the 2nd century (an unlikely possibility, given the numerous complaints about the weight of the tax burden) or the extra costs are not readily evident. These additional costs may still have been "defense-related": e.g. fortifications, granaries, armories, clothing factories, irregular foederati forces, or payments to tribal chiefs to buy peace and allegiance. The latter had a long history: such payments are recorded in Julio-Claudian times. Elton points out that his estimates are for very base pay, 9 solidi for cavalrymen and 5 for foot soldiers, allowing 10% additional expenses for officers' salaries and do not include non-quantifiable military costs such as fortifications, ships, artillery, wagons, tackle, armor, uniforms, pension payments, allowances for families, periodic donatives. Accession and 5-year donatives increased pay 25–30% and was made in gold and silver. By comparison tax officials calculated the annual cost of a soldier at 36 solidi covering pay, provisions, and equipment. This was worth 500 silver denarii of the first century A.D. Even if inflated to boost gold income to pay mercenaries as replacements for Roman recruits it suggests a wide range of hidden costs. Harl points out p. 224, that the value of 100,000 war horses 12.5 million denarii or 12,500 pounds of gold. The number was 3 to 4 times this in the 4th century because of the vast expansion of the cavalry. The value of the horses (not the annual take-in which was much much less) was between 1.5–4 million solidi (20,800 and 55,000 pounds of gold or 21 million and 55 million denarii).

By comparison, the payroll for the 330,000 soldiers in 6 AD is 68 million silver denarii (1000 per lb. of gold) but the total cost with retirement benefits and equipment and supplies was 124 million denarii – or 206 and 375 denarii respectively per soldier averaged or 131,250 lbs. of gold. The figures given mid-second century are 387,000 soldiers and 98 million denarii and total costs 181 million and is 253 and 432 denarii per soldier. The figures for AD 230 230 million denarii in pay and 438 total costs at 525 and 1,100 denarii respectively per soldier however with debased denarii with half the silver content of early 2nd century coins. By comparison Elton estimates the pay expenses of the Roman Army of 600,000 from 350–400 AD at 63,250 lbs. gold (63,250 million denarii) and total cost at 125,000 lbs. of gold (125,000 million denarii) which is only 105 denarii and 210 respectively. At the time the Empire had a sound gold coin, the solidus, tariffed at 72 to the pound from 309. The mid-fourth century figures are virtually the same as the Augustan figures of 6 A.D. for 330,000 in 350. The discrepancy may be the result of lower pay scales, greater quantity for equipment needs as seen in the establishment of over 100 imperial armories and clothing mills, cost-cutting measures, the expenses associated with frequent troop movements and costs other than payrolls, animals and other easily quantifiable expenses.

== See also ==
- aerarium militare, the military treasury at Rome from which veterans' benefits were funded
- donativum, a bonus paid by emperors to secure soldiers' loyalty
