= Aerarium militare =

Military treasury of Imperial Rome

The aerarium militare was the military treasury of Imperial Rome. It was instituted by Augustus, the first Roman emperor, as a "permanent revenue source" for pensions (praemia) for veterans of the Imperial Roman army. The treasury derived its funding from new taxes, an inheritance tax and a sales tax, and regularized the ad hoc provisions for veterans that under the Republic often had involved socially disruptive confiscation of property.

The praefecti aerarii militaris (singular praefectus) were the three prefects who oversaw the treasury.

== Benefits ==
The Imperial biographer and historian Suetonius saw the aerarium militare as a response to the uncertainty of retired military men in need who might be inclined to support a coup or foment unrest. The professionalizing of the army during the Republic created the new problem of veterans, since earlier in Rome's history male citizens served short-term to confront specific threats or carry out seasonal campaigns, and then returned to their normal occupations. The solution in the late Republic had been to settle veterans in colonies in conquered territory, or on ostensibly public land in Italy that in fact had been used by the aristocracy for personal gain; the redistribution of this land by military commanders such as Marius and Pompeius was resented by the elite as a popularist currying of favor among the lower ranks of society. A state-supported benefit helped redirect the former soldier's loyalty from his immediate commanding officer to the Roman state as a whole. Under Augustus, monetary grants replaced land redistributions, and were better received by the upper classes, who nevertheless complained about new taxes.

Augustus included the aerarium militare among the accomplishments in his Res Gestae, the commemorative autobiography published posthumously throughout the Empire. In addressing the Roman Senate on the subject, Augustus had stated his intention to provide for military personnel from enlistment through retirement.

A soldier earned a one-time praemium or discharge benefit upon completing his service (sixteen years for the Praetorian Guard, twenty for regular duty in the army). At the end of Augustus's reign, the pension for a Praetorian guard was 20,000 sesterces (HS), and that of a legionary 12,000. In the 1st century, a legionary's retirement benefit would have amounted to about 12 years of service pay. The praemium remained stable until the time of Caracalla, who increased it to 20,000 HS for a legionary and a higher but unrecorded amount for a Praetorian guard.

When the treasury experienced a shortfall, the emperor might avoid paying pensions by arbitrarily extending the length of military service, in a form of forced retention or "stop-loss policy".

== Funding ==
The aerarium militare was part of an Augustan fiscal initiative that was at first greeted with hostility. In 6 AD, Augustus capitalized the pension fund with 170 million sesterces of his own money, along with voluntary contributions from client kings and cities. The amount was insufficient, and after soliciting proposals on revenue enhancement from senators, all of which he rejected, he finally forced through an inheritance tax of 5 percent (vicesima hereditatium). Inheritances left to members of the deceased's immediate family were exempted, as were estates below a certain valuation.

The other source of tax revenue for the military treasury—a sales tax of 1 percent on goods sold at auction (centesima rerum venalium)—is less attested.

== Administration ==
The military treasury was located on the Capitoline Hill at the time of Nero, as attested by a military diploma dating to 65 AD. It is unclear whether it was a physical storehouse for coins brought to the capital in payment of taxes, or an office for paper transactions.

The treasury was administered by three prefects (praefecti aerarii militaris), who were former praetors at first chosen by lot for a term of three years. Later they were appointed by the emperor. Their precise duties are unclear, though they were not charged with collecting the taxes. They may have served mainly to provide financial management and security. Each senatorial prefect was assigned two lictors and other staff, but the later imperially-appointed prefects had no lictors. (The lictor was an honorary bodyguard who was part of the civil service of Rome.) The change to appointment by the emperor may have been made as early as the reign of Claudius. The younger Pliny was a prefect of the military treasury appointed by Domitian.

== See also ==
- Donativum, a cash "gift" from a new emperor to secure the loyalty of troops
- Economics of the Roman army

== Bibliography ==
- Phang, Sara Elise. Roman Military Service: Ideologies of Discipline in the Late Republic and Early Principate Cambridge University Press, 2008.
- Millar, Fergus. Rome, the Greek World, and the East: Government, Society and Culture in the Roman Empire. University of North Carolina Press, 2004.
- Swan, Peter Michael. The Augustan Succession: An Historical Commentary on Cassius Dio's Roman History Books 55–56 (9 B.C–A.D. 14). Oxford University Press, 2004.
