= Quintus Fabius Catullinus =

Quintus Fabius Catullinus was a Hispano-Roman general and senator who flourished in the second century AD.

== Career ==
In 128 AD, Catullinus was appointed Legate of Legio III Augusta in Numidia when the Emperor Hadrian visited the province. This visit by the emperor was memorialized in an extensive inscription at Lambaesis During his tenure, Catullinus dedicated two altars to "Jupiter the most excellent" and "To the mighty Winds of Good Weather", when the rains came after a long drought during the Emperor's visit. The Emperor praised Catullinus' training of his soldiers.

In 130 AD, he was elected consul together with Marcus Flavius Aper as his colleague.

Political offices
Preceded by ignotus, and Quintus Julius Balbus as suffect consuls	Consul of the Roman Empire; 130 with Marcus Flavius Aper	Succeeded by Cassius Agrippa, and Tiberius Claudius Quartinus as suffect consuls
