= Marcus Flavius Aper =

Marcus Flavius Aper was a Roman politician and senator in the second century AD.

== Biography ==
Aper's father was Marcus Flavius Aper, whom Ronald Syme has identified as suffect consul for the nundinium July-September 103. Another Marcus Flavius Aper served as consul in 176 AD; this Aper may be his son -- in which case the younger Aper achieved the consulate late in life -- or his grandson.

He was appointed Governor of the province of Lycia et Pamphylia, and attested in that position from 125 to 127. In 130 AD, he was elected ordinary consul together with Quintus Fabius Catullinus as his colleague.

Political offices
| Preceded by ignotus, and Quintus Julius Balbus as suffect consuls | Consul of the Roman Empire; 130 with Quintus Fabius Catullinus | Succeeded by Cassius Agrippa, and Tiberius Claudius Quartinus as suffect consuls |
