= Fulginiae =

Fulginiae or Fulginium (modern Foligno) was an ancient town of Umbria, Italy, on the later line of the Via Flaminia, c. 20 km S of Nuceria (Nocera Umbra).

It appears to have been of comparatively late origin, in as much as it had no city walls, but, in imperial times especially, owing to its position on the new line of the Via Flaminia, it must have increased in importance as being the point of departure of roads to Perusia and to Picenum over the pass of Plestia. It appears to have had an amphitheatre, and three bridges over the Topino river are attributed to the Roman period.

Five kilometers to the north lay the independent community of Forum Flaminii, the site of which is marked by the small town of San Giovanni Profiamma, at or near which the newer line of the Via Flaminia rejoined the older. It was no doubt founded by the builder of the road, Gaius Flaminius, consul in 223 BC.
