= Gallia Narbonensis =

Roman Empire province from 121 BC to the 5th century AD

Province of Gallia Narbonensis Provincia Gallia Narbonensis
- Province of the Roman Empire
- 121 BC– 462
- The province of Gallia Narbonensis within the Roman Empire in 125 AD
- Capital: Narbo Martius
- Area
  - Coordinates: 44.0000°N 4.0000°E
- Historical era: Classical antiquity
  - Conquest of the Arverni and Allobroges: 121 BC
  - Conquered by the Visigoths and Burgundians after the murder of Emperor Majorian.: 462
Succeeded by
Visigothic Kingdom
- Today part of: France; Italy; Monaco

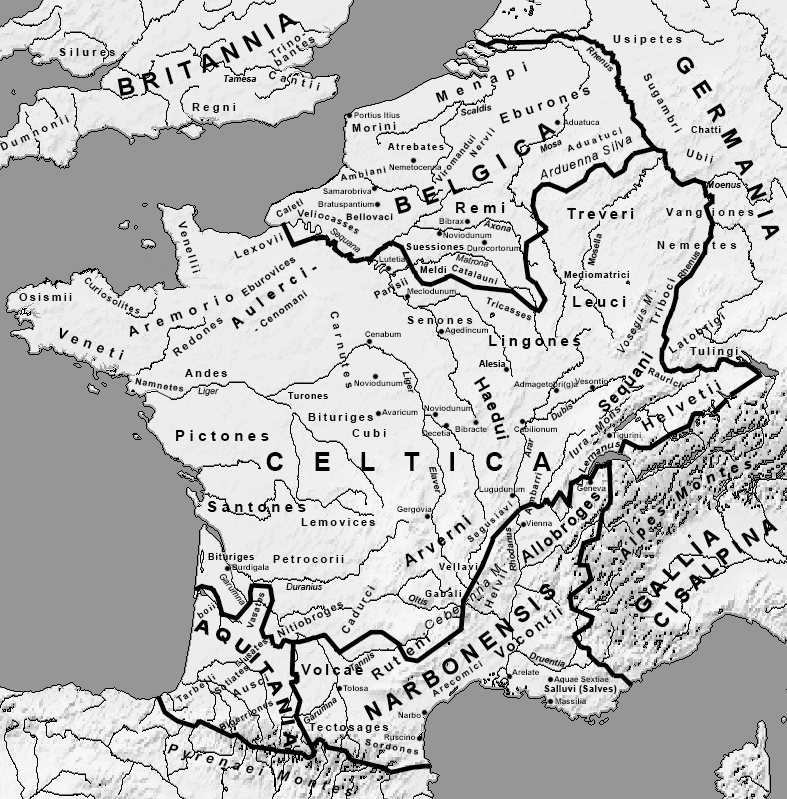
The Roman provinces in Gaul around 58 BC; the coastline shown here is the modern one, different from the ancient coastline in some parts of the English Channel.

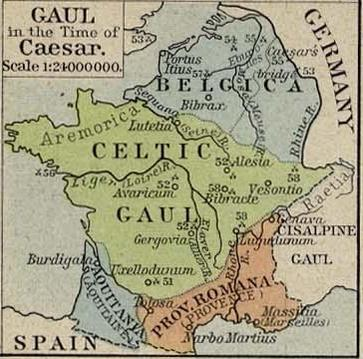
Gallia Narbonensis can be seen in the south of modern-day France as a Roman province.

Gallia Narbonensis (Latin for 'Gaul of Narbonne', from its chief settlement) (Note: The name is also variously expressed as Narbonese or Narbonnese Gaul, Narbonian Gaul, and Narbonensian Gaul.) was a Roman province located in what today are Occitania and Provence, in Southern France. It was also known as Provincia Nostra ('Our Province'), because it was the first Roman province north of the Alps, and as Gallia Transalpina ('Transalpine Gaul'), distinguishing it from Cisalpine Gaul in Northern Italy. It became a Roman province in the late 2nd century BC. Gallia Narbonensis was bordered by the Pyrenees Mountains on the west, the Cévennes to the north, the Alps on the east, and the Gulf of Lion on the south; the province included the majority of the Rhône catchment. The western region of Gallia Narbonensis was known as Septimania. The province was a valuable part of the Roman Empire, owing to the Roman civitas (and former Greek colony) of Massilia (modern Marseille), its location between the Spanish provinces (Hispania) and Rome, and its economic output.

== Names ==
The province of Gallia Transalpina ('Transalpine Gaul') was later renamed Gallia Narbonensis, after its newly established capital of Colonia Narbo Martius (colloquially known as Narbo, at the location of the modern Narbonne), a Roman colony founded on the coast in 118 BC. The name Gallia Narbonensis most likely originated in the Augustan era. Its first recorded use was in a census conducted by Gnaeus Pullius Pollio. The Romans had called it Provincia Nostra ('Our Province') or simply Provincia ('the Province'). The term has survived in the modern French name of Provence (Occitan: Provença) for the eastern part of the area, which is now a region of France.

== Founding ==
The ancient Greek colony of Massalia was founded in approximately 600 BC, by which the Hellenisation of Celtic Gaul began. The Roman involvement in Transalpine Gaul occurred in 218 BC; according to Livy, the Romans tried to establish the alliance against Carthage in Gaul and Hispania, but gained no success. Hannibal led the Carthaginian forces and routed the local Gaulish tribes, crossing the Rhône. Massalia, by then known as Massilia to the Romans, had already formed an alliance with Rome, which agreed to protect the town in exchange for supplying vital information and providing a fleet as Rome needed. Rome also demanded from Massilia a small strip of land in order to build a road to Hispania, to assist in troop transport. The Romans therefore landed their troops at Massilia to protect the city. After Rome held territories in Hispania, the Romans left control of the route to the city, causing praetor Lucius Baebius to be killed by the Ligures while en route to Hispania in 189 BC.

During this period, the Mediterranean settlements on the coast were threatened by the powerful Gaulish tribes to the north, especially those known as the Arverni and the Allobroges. In the First Transalpine War (125–121 BC), the Roman general Quintus Fabius Maximus (later additionally named Allobrogicus) campaigned in the area and defeated the Allobroges and the Arverni under king Bituitus in the Battle of the Isère River. This defeat substantially weakened the Arverni and ensured the further security of Gallia Narbonensis. The area became a Roman province in 121 BC.

The province had come into Roman control originally under the name Gallia Transalpina (Transalpine Gaul), which distinguished it from Cisalpine Gaul on the near side of the Alps to Rome. In this strip of land, the Romans founded the town of Narbonne in 118 BC. At the same time, they built the Via Domitia, the first Roman road in Gaul, connecting Gaul to Hispania, and the Via Aquitania, which led toward the Atlantic through Tolosa (Toulouse) and Burdigala (Bordeaux). Thus, the Romans built a crossroads that made Narbonne an optimal trading center, and it became a major trading competitor to Massilia. From Narbonne, the Romans established the province of Transalpine Gaul, later called Gallia Narbonensis.

During the Sertorian War (80–72 BC) against the breakaway state of former Roman senator and general Quintus Sertorius, Gallia Narbonensis was an important base for military activities. This was an important event in the Romanisation of Narbonese Gaul, as it resulted in the Romans organising the province.

== Later history ==
Control of the province, which bordered directly on Italia, gave the Roman state several advantages: control of the land route between Italy and the Iberian Peninsula; a territorial buffer against Gaulish attacks on Italy; and control of the lucrative trade routes of the Rhône valley between Gaul and the markets of Massilia. Julius Caesar rebuilt Narbo and built the cities of Fréjus (Forum Julium) and Arles. Caesar also granted many communities in Gallia Narbonensis citizenship. In 49 BC, the city of Massilia sided with Pompey during the civil war. After the war ended in Caesar's favour, Massilia lost all of its independence and was fully subject to Roman rule.

In 40 BC, during the Second Triumvirate, Lepidus was given responsibility for Narbonese Gaul, along with Hispania; Mark Antony held the balance of Gaul; and Octavian (the future Emperor as Augustus Caesar) took control of Africa, Sardinia, and Sicily.

After becoming emperor, Augustus (Octavian) made Gallia Narbonensis a senatorial province governed by a proconsul. By the late first century BC, the traditional hilltop village pattern in Gallia Narbonensis had largely disappeared. In its place emerged a new settlement framework, probably shaped by the relative peace and security during the early imperial period: the countryside was dotted with small farms, as defensible elevated sites were no longer essential.

Emperor Diocletian's administrative reorganisation of the empire in c. 314 AD merged the provinces Gallia Narbonensis and Gallia Aquitania into a new administrative unit called Dioecesis Viennensis (Diocese of Vienne) with the capital more to the north in Vienne. The new diocese's name was later changed to Dioecesis Septem Provinciarum (Diocese of the Seven Provinces), indicating that Diocletian had demoted the term "province" to mean a smaller subdivision than in prior usage.

Galla Narbonensis and surrounding areas were incorporated into the Visigothic Kingdom between 462 and 477 AD, permanently ending Roman political control. After this takeover, the Visigothic dominions were to be generally known as Septimania, while to the east of the lower Rhône, the name Provence came into use.

== List of proconsular governors of Gallia Narbonensis ==
The list has gaps as well as incomplete names due to missing and damaged records from the era; dates are mostly approximate.

- Gnaeus Pullius Pollio, 18–16 BC
- Marcus Cincius Saturninus, between 16 BC and 12 AD
- Titedius Labeo, 12–15 AD
- Manius Vibius Balbinus, 15–17
- Torquatus Novellus Atticus, 30–34
- Titus Mussidius Pollianus, 34–37
- Titus Vinius, c. 54–60
- L. V[...]dius Bassus, 77
- Gaius Iulius Cornutus Tertullus, before 78
- Aulus Larcius Priscus, 103–109
- Marcus Acilius Priscus Egrilius Plarianus, 118–120
- Lucius Aninius Sextius Florentinus, 124
- Lucius Aurelius Gallus, 124–127
- Lucius Novius Crispinus Martialis Saturninus, 144–145
- Gaius Seius Calpurnius Quadratus Sittianus, before 150
- Lucius Cestius Gallus, between 165 and 183
- Gnaeus Cornelius Aquilius Niger, between 138 and 192
- Lucius Fabius Cilo, between 180 and 192
- [...]dius Titti filius, 2nd century
- Lucius Ranius Optatus Novatus, 197–214
- Unknown, 210, allegedly killed for supporting Geta
- [...]us, between 210 and 230
- Tiberius Claudius Paulinus, 216–217
- Gaius Aemilius Berenicianus Maximus, between 222 and 235
- Iulianus, between 222 and 235
- C. Seius Calpurnius Quadratus Sittianus, mid-3rd century
