= Roman military diploma =

Roman honourable discharge certificate

A Roman military diploma was a document inscribed in bronze certifying that the holder was honourably discharged from the Roman armed forces and/or had received the grant of Roman citizenship from the emperor as reward for service.

The diploma was a notarised copy of an original constitutio (decree) issued by the emperor in Rome, listing by regiment (or unit) the eligible veterans. The constitutio, recorded on a large bronze plate, was lodged in the military archive at Rome (none such has been found; presumably they were melted down in later times).

== History ==
Diplomas were issued during the Principate period (52–284 AD) to retiring veterans who had served in those corps of the Roman armed forces which enlisted peregrini, that is, inhabitants of the Roman empire who were not Roman citizens (the vast majority of the empire's population in the 1st and 2nd centuries). Such corps were: the auxilia; Roman navy, the Praetorian Guard's cavalry (equites singulares Augusti); and the cohortes urbanae (the City of Rome's public-order battalions).

The first known diploma dates from AD 52, under emperor Claudius (r. 41–54), who appears to have regularised the practice of granting Roman citizenship to non-citizen auxiliaries after 25 years' service (26 in the navy).

Diplomas were not normally issued to discharged legionaries, as the legions recruited Roman citizens only. However, legionary diplomas were exceptionally issued after the Civil War of 68/69 AD. As an emergency measure, 2 new legions, the I and II Classica (later reconstituted and renamed as I and II Adiutrix, respectively) were formed mainly from naval marines, many of whom did not hold citizenship. At the end of the crisis, these were all awarded Roman citizenship.

In 212, the Constitutio Antoniniana, issued by the emperor Caracalla, granted Roman citizenship to all the inhabitants of the empire, thus ending the second-class peregrini status. This made military diplomas largely redundant, and indeed the last known auxiliary diplomas date from AD 203. But diplomas for service in the navy, Praetorian Guard cavalry and the cohortes urbanae continued to be issued until the late 3rd century. This might be explained by the fact that barbari (foreigners from outside the Roman empire) were still recruited for those units.

== Rights granted ==
The veteran was granted Roman citizenship, which carried important legal and fiscal advantages, including exemption from the poll tax (tributum capitis) payable by all non-citizen subjects of the empire. Citizenship was also granted to the veteran's natural children, but not to his female partner. Until ca. 140, all children born to the veteran during his term of service were eligible. After that date, it appears that the grant was restricted to children born after the veteran's discharge (unless the veteran had registered children born before his enlistment). This seemingly retrogressive step has been doubted by some historians, and it is possible that the available evidence is garbled.

Until the time of emperor Septimius Severus (r. 197–211), serving soldiers were legally prohibited to marry. In practice, many formed stable relationships with local women and brought up families. Diplomas retrospectively regularised such unions by granting the discharged veteran, in addition to citizenship, the right of conubium ("inter-marriage"), which was necessary as Roman citizens were not legally permitted to marry non-citizens (unless the latter possessed "Latin Rights").

An exceptional constitutio of emperor Hadrian (r. 117–38) is known from 3 diplomas, which granted citizenship to the beneficiaries' parents and siblings, in addition to their children.

== Description ==
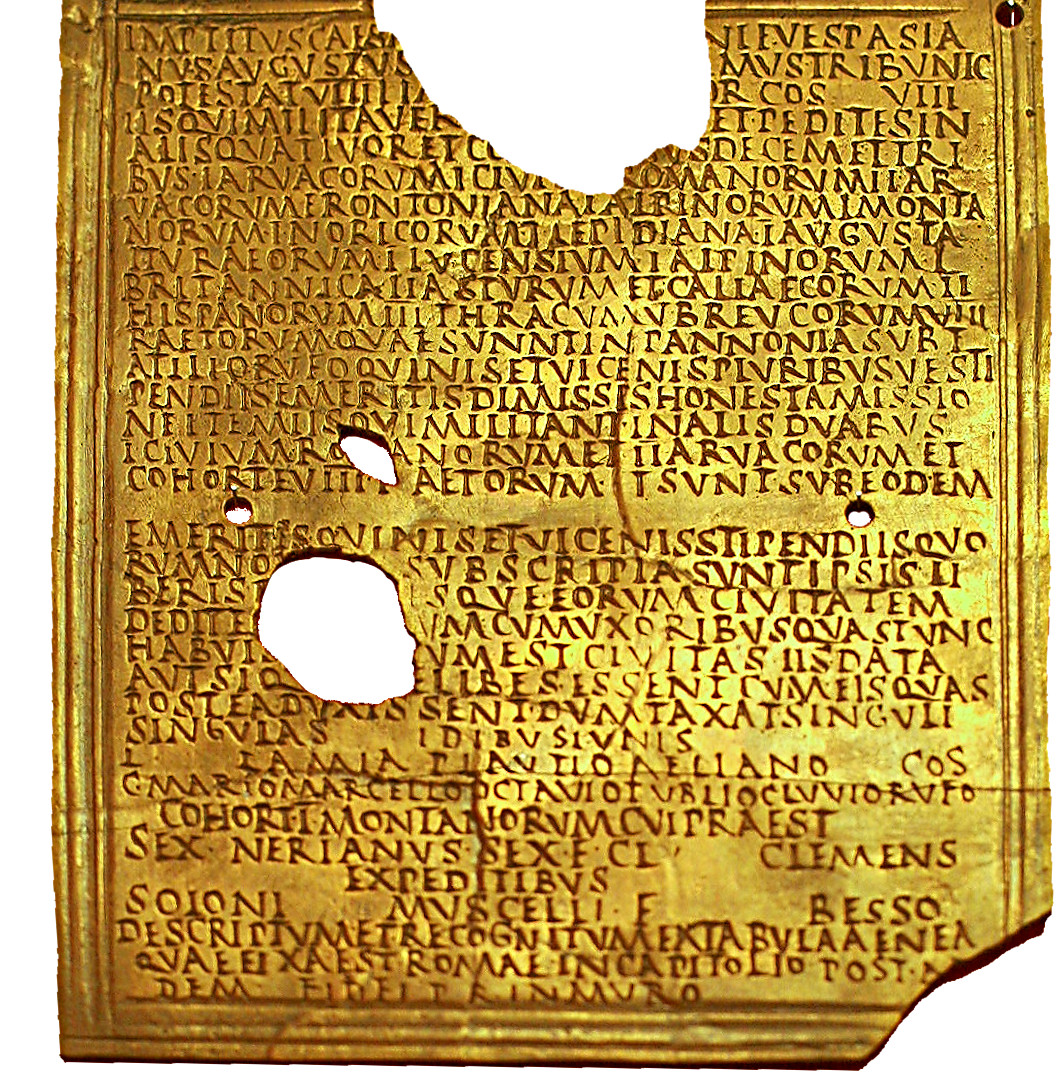
Roman military diploma ad 80 (Museum Carnuntum)

The diploma consisted of two bronze tablets hinged together. Inscriptions would be engraved on each side of both plates. The full text of a diploma was engraved on the outer side of the so-called tabula 1, while the outer side of tabula 2 displayed the names of 7 witnesses, their seals covered and protected by metal strips (such seals have rarely survived, being of organic material). The text of tabula 1 was reproduced exactly on the two inner sides. The plates would then be folded shut and sealed together, so that the external inscription would be legible without breaking the seals. The internal inscription was the official notarised copy of the text on the constitutio published in Rome. The double-inscription and seals were presumably to prevent forgery or alteration.

In a likely scenario, the holder would take the sealed diploma to the province or civitas (city/county) where he intended to live in retirement. He would then present the diploma to the keeper of archives either at the provincial governor's headquarters (or perhaps at his local civitas offices). The archivist could break the seals and check that the data on the internal inscription matched the external one. If all was in order, he would then enter the diploma-holder's name onto the register of resident Roman citizens.

The bronze of the known military diplomas is chemically very uniform and therefore appears to have been produced in Rome specifically for this use.

== Research significance ==
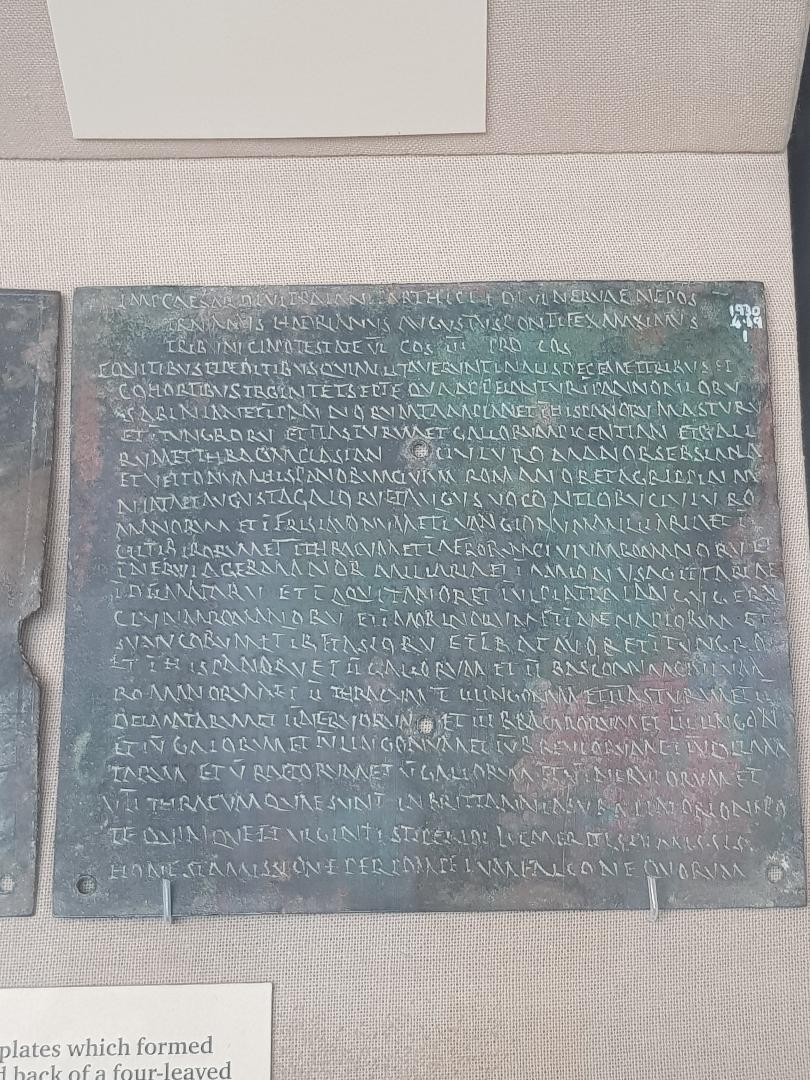
One of two bronze plaques granting Roman citizenship to an individual named Gemellus, dated July 17th 122 AD, from Brigetio, Hungary and now in the British Museum

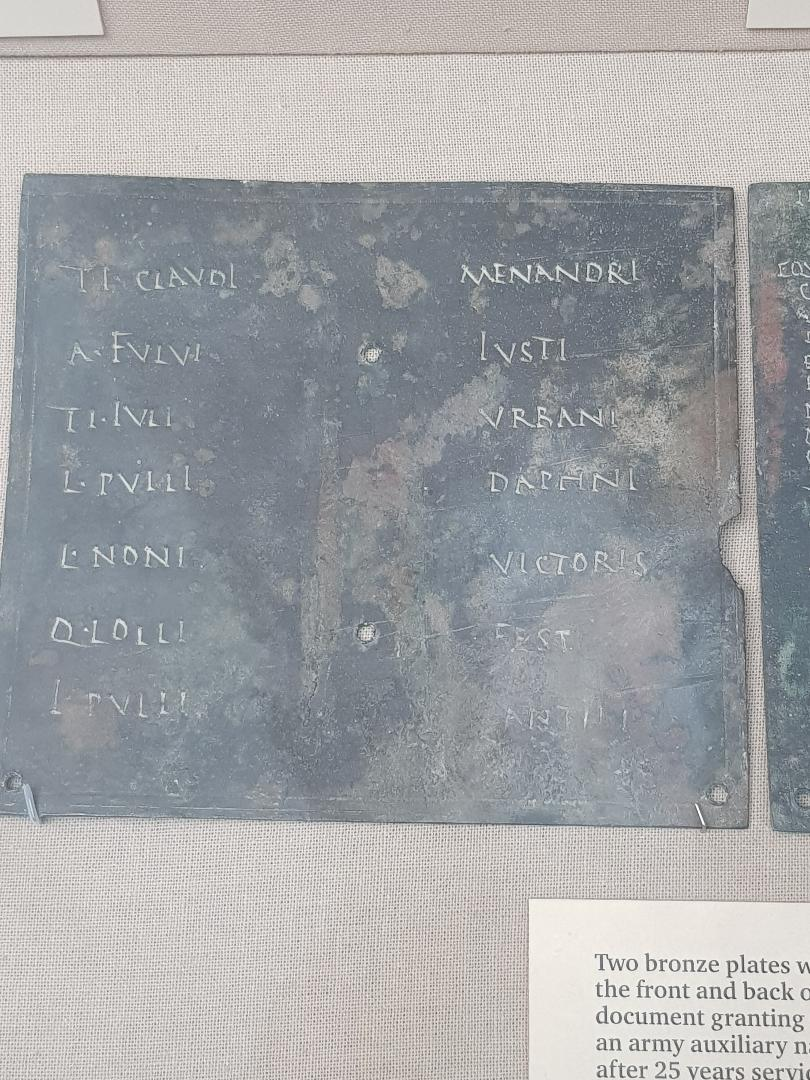
Second of two plaques from Roman Military Diploma found in Brigetio, Hungary in the British Museum

Over 800 diplomas from the Principate have been found and over 650 published (although the majority have survived in only fragmentary form). This constitutes a rare corpus of Roman documentary material, whose survival is due to their being made of metal, rather than degradable material such as papyrus, wood or wax. A particular advantage of diplomas for historians is that they are dated. The date of the constitution was entered as the year of the emperor's tribunicia potestas; while the date of issue of the notarised copy (diploma) was given as the day of the month and the names of the Consuls currently in office (resulting in diplomas being an important source for the names of suffect consuls). As these documents also list the name of the provincial governor, they provide valuable data on senators' career-paths. In addition, diplomas usually record the names of several auxiliary units which served in the same province at the same time, as they were normally issued in batches. Thus a single diploma may yield the names of as many as 25 units included in the same constitution, critical data on the deployment of auxiliary units in the various provinces of the empire at different times. Constitutions are also known just for individual units, even individual veterans.

The following information on the beneficiary was usually recorded in the diploma: beneficiary's regiment, regimental commander's name, beneficiary's military rank, name of beneficiary, name of beneficiary's father and origin (nation, tribe or city); name of beneficiary's wife and name of her father and origin; and names of children granted citizenship.

== See also ==
- Military discharge#Military discharge certificate
