= Werner Eck =

German historian of classical antiquity (born 1939)

Werner Eck (born 17 December 1939) is professor of Ancient History at Cologne University, Germany, and a noted expert on the history and epigraphy of imperial Rome. His main interests are the prosopography of the Roman ruling class (magistrates, Senate) and the Roman period of the city of Cologne (Colonia Claudia Ara Agrippinensium). He also researched the Bar Kokhba revolt from the Roman point of view.

== Publications ==
German language publications:

- Senatoren von Vespasian bis Hadrian. Prosopographische Untersuchungen mit Einschluss der Jahres- u. Provinzialfasten der Statthalter. Beck, München 1970, ISBN 3-406-03096-3 (Vestigia, Band 13).
- Die staatliche Organisation Italiens in der hohen Kaiserzeit. Beck, München 1979, ISBN 3-406-04798-X (Vestigia, Band 28).
- Die Statthalter der germanischen Provinzen vom 1.–3. Jahrhundert. Rheinland-Verlag, Köln 1985, ISBN 3-7927-0807-8 (Epigraphische Studien, Band 14).
- Agrippina, die Stadtgründerin Kölns. Eine Frau in der frühkaiserzeitlichen Politik. Greven, Köln 1993, ISBN 3-7743-0271-5.
- Die Verwaltung des Römischen Reiches in der Hohen Kaiserzeit. Ausgewählte Beiträge. 2 Bände, Reinhardt, Basel 1995, ISBN 3-7245-0866-2; 1998, ISBN 3-7245-0962-6.
- (with Antonio Caballos and Fernando Fernández) Das Senatus consultum de Cn. Pisone patre. Beck, München 1996, ISBN 3-406-41400-1 (Vestigia, Band 48).
- Augustus und seine Zeit. Beck, München 1998, 4. Auflage 2006, ISBN 3-406-41884-8 (with English, Spanish, Italian and Czech translations).
- Cambridge Ancient History. Band XI, Cap. IV–VII, 2000, S. 195–293.
- Köln in römischer Zeit. Geschichte einer Stadt im Rahmen des Imperium Romanum. Greven, Köln 2004, ISBN 3-7743-0357-6 (Geschichte der Stadt Köln, Band 1).
- Rom und Judaea. Fünf Vorträge zur römischen Herrschaft in Palästina. Mohr Siebeck, Tübingen 2007, ISBN 978-3-16-149460-4 (Tria Corda, Band 2).
