= Burbuleia gens =

Ancient Roman family

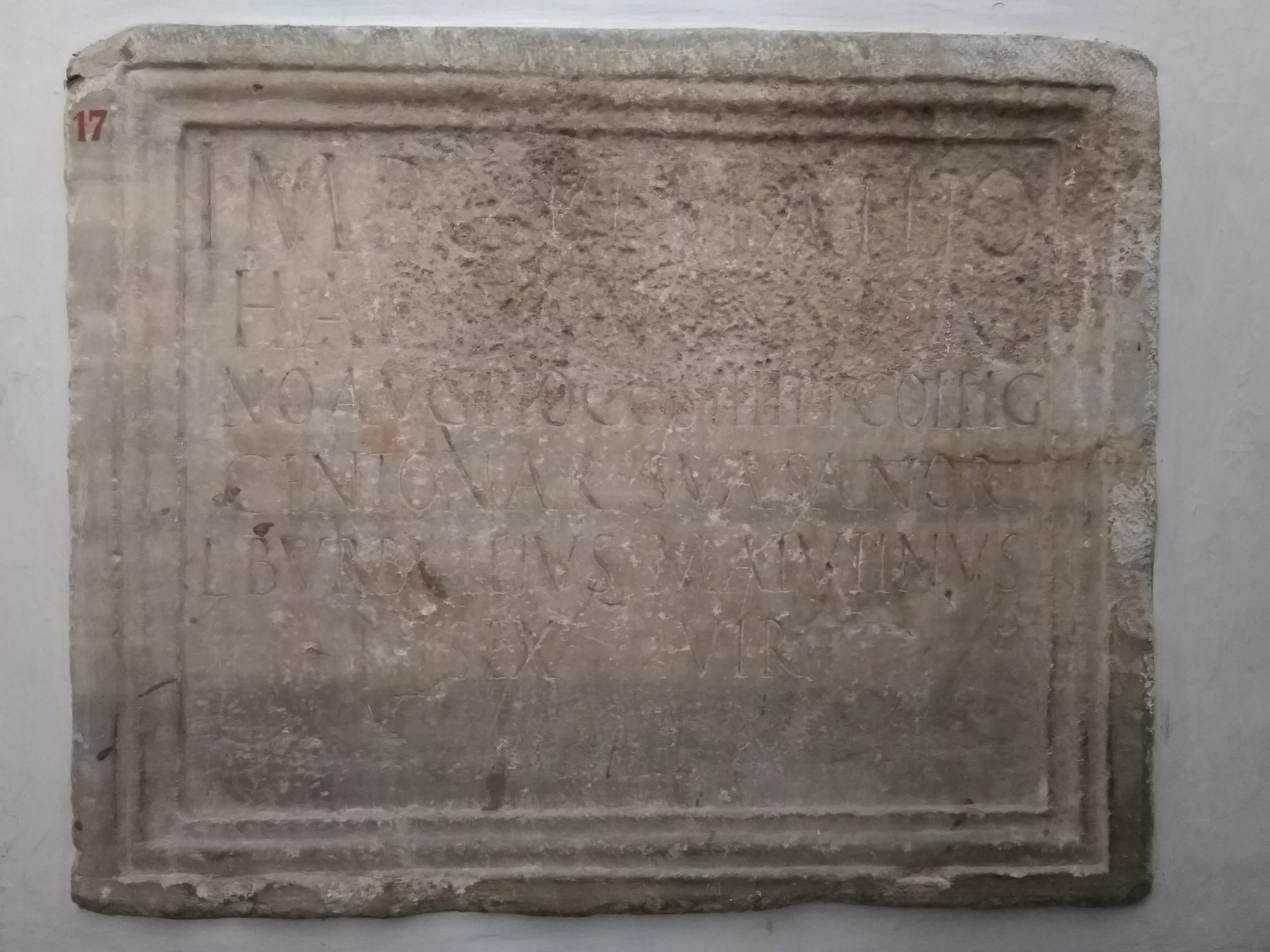
Inscription of Lucius Burbuleius Matutinus (CIL XI, 6162), from Suasa.

The gens Burbuleia, occasionally written Burboleia, was an obscure plebeian family at ancient Rome. Members of this gens are mentioned in the time of Cicero, but the only one who achieved any distinction in the Roman state was Lucius Burbuleius Optatus, consul in AD 135.

== Origin ==
The nomen Burbuleius belongs to a large class of gentilicia ending in -eius, typically formed from Oscan names originally ending in -as. However, as the number of such gentile names grew, -eius came to be regarded as a regular gentile-forming suffix, and was applied in cases where it had no morphological justification, so it cannot be determined whether the root of Burbuleius is Oscan, or perhaps a Latin cognomen, like Burbulus. There was a family of this name from Minturnae, in southern Latium, which would be consistent with either a Latin or Oscan origin. Minturnae was originally a town of the Ausones, which received a Roman colony in 296 BC.

== Branches and cognomina ==
The only distinct family of the Burbuleii bore the surname Optatus, desired or welcome. The consul Optatus had the additional surname Ligarianus, which in Republican times would normally have indicated adoption from the Ligarian gens, but by the second century such nomenclature usually indicates descent from a family through the female line. Secunda, borne by Burbuleia, the wife of Cornelius Hilarus, was a personal or individualizing surname, derived from the old Latin praenomen Secunda, originally given to a second daughter.

== Members ==
This list includes abbreviated praenomina. For an explanation of this practice, see filiation.

- Burbuleius, a comic actor who lent his name to Gaius Scribonius Curio, the consul of 76 BC, who despite his excellent elocution was ridiculed for his lack of knowledge, slow thinking, and awkward gesticulations.
- Burbuleia Secunda, buried at Rome with her daughter, Cornelia Fortunata, aged twenty-two years, five months, in a tomb built by her husband, Marcus Cornelius Hilarus.
- Burboleius C. f., named in an inscription from Rome.
- Lucius Burbuleius Optatus, buried at Minturnae in Latium, aged twenty-six years, eight months.
- Lucius Burbuleius Optatus, father of the consul Ligarianus.
- Lucius Burbuleius L. f. Optatus Ligarianus, consul suffectus in AD 135, had been prefect of the public treasury, quaestor, plebeian aedile, praetor, one of the Sodales Augustales, and was at various times governor of Syria, Cappadocia, and Sicily.
- Lucius Burbuleius Matutinus, one of the Seviri Augustales at Suasa during the mid-second century.

== See also ==
- List of Roman gentes

== Bibliography ==
- Titus Livius (Livy), History of Rome.
- Marcus Velleius Paterculus, Compendium of Roman History.
- Valerius Maximus, Factorum ac Dictorum Memorabilium (Memorable Facts and Sayings).
- Gaius Plinius Secundus (Pliny the Elder), Historia Naturalis (Natural History).
- Theodor Mommsen et alii, Corpus Inscriptionum Latinarum (The Body of Latin Inscriptions, abbreviated CIL), Berlin-Brandenburgische Akademie der Wissenschaften (1853–present).
- René Cagnat et alii, L'Année épigraphique (The Year in Epigraphy, abbreviated AE), Presses Universitaires de France (1888–present).
- George Davis Chase, "The Origin of Roman Praenomina", in Harvard Studies in Classical Philology, vol. VIII, pp. 103–184 (1897).
- Paul von Rohden, Elimar Klebs, & Hermann Dessau, Prosopographia Imperii Romani (The Prosopography of the Roman Empire, abbreviated PIR), Berlin (1898).
- Olli Salomies, Adoptive and Polyonymous Nomenclature in the Roman Empire, Societas Scientiarum Fennica, Helsinki (1992).
- John C. Traupman, The New College Latin & English Dictionary, Bantam Books, New York (1995).
