= Gnaeus Pompeius Longinus =

Roman legate of Judaea from 85 to 89

Legate of Iudaea
- In office 85–89
- Preceded by: Marcus Salvidienus
- Succeeded by: Sextus Hermentidius Campanus

Personal details
- Born: c. 1st century Roman Empire
- Died: c. 105 Dacia

Gnaeus Pompeius Longinus (died 105) was a Roman senator and general. He was the 5th legate of Judaea from 85 to 89 and held the suffect consulship in the nundinium of September–October 90 as the colleague of Lucius Albius Pullaienus Pollio. He was deceived into a trap by Decebalus during Trajan's Second Dacian War, and rather than provide an advantage to the Dacian king, killed himself.

== Life ==
His full name was Gnaeus Pinarius Aemilius Cicatricula Pompeius Longinus. Arthur Stein first suggested the identification of his birth father was the Pompeius Longinus, military tribune of the Praetorian guard in 69, mentioned by Tacitus; this identification was also proposed by Ronald Syme. Salomies concurs in this identification, while proposing that his adoptive parent was Gnaeus Pinarius Aemilius Cicatricula, governor of Africa in 80. Syme also proposes that, based on his gentilicium, Longinus may have originated in Gallia Narbonensis, but Edward Dabrowa notes that the same criterion could be used to argue that Longinus came from Hispania.

Longinus served as legate for Roman Judaea from 85 to 89. This post was combined with serving as commander of Legio X Fretensis, which at the time was stationed in Jerusalem. After his consulate, he held two more governorships: Moesia Superior, on the Danubean frontier, from 93 to 96; then he was transferred to Pannonia, a nearby province, which Longinus administered until the year 99.

== Pompeius Longinus and the Dacian War ==
During the Second Dacian War, Trajan had appointed Longinus as one of his generals. By the year 105, despite initial victories, the war was going badly for Decebalus; "nevertheless," writes Dio Cassius, "by craft and deceit he almost compassed Trajan's death." After several failed attempts, Decebalus decided on inviting Longinus to meet with him, promising that he would do whatever should be demanded. However, when Longinus presented himself to Decebalus, the Dacian king had him arrested and interrogated him about Trajan's plans; when Longinus refused to answer, Decebalus had him imprisoned. The king then sent a messenger to Trajan offering to trade Longinus for the territory Trajan had conquered, and the money Decebalus had spent on the war. Dio Cassius describes the Roman Emperor's response: "An ambiguous answer was returned, of such a nature as not to cause Decebalus to believe that Trajan regarded Longinus as either of great importance or yet of slight importance, the object being to prevent his being destroyed, on the one hand, or being preserved to them on excessive terms, on the other."

While Decebalus considered his next step, Longinus carried out his own plans. Having obtained some poison with which to kill himself, he first sought to help his freedman gain safety, so wrote out a letter to Trajan beseeching him to consider the terms of the offer, and convinced the king to allow his man to deliver this letter; after the freedman had departed, Longinus drank the poison that night and killed himself. Decebalus then sent a centurion who had been captured with Longinus to Trajan, offering to trade Longinus' body and ten other captives for Longinus' freedman. Dio Cassius concludes, "Trajan neither sent him back nor surrendered the freedman, deeming his safety more important for the dignity of the empire than the burial of Longinus."

== See also ==
- Gens Aemilia
- Gens Pinaria
- Gens Pompeia
- List of Roman Prefects, Procurators and Legates of Judaea, AD 6–135

== Notes ==
Political offices
Preceded by Publius Baebius Italicus, and Gaius Aquillius Proculus as suffect consuls	Suffect consul of the Roman Empire; 90 with Lucius Albius Pullaienus Pollio	Succeeded by Marcus Tullius Cerialis, and Gnaeus Pompeius Catullinus as suffect consuls
