= Aemilia gens =

Ancient Roman family

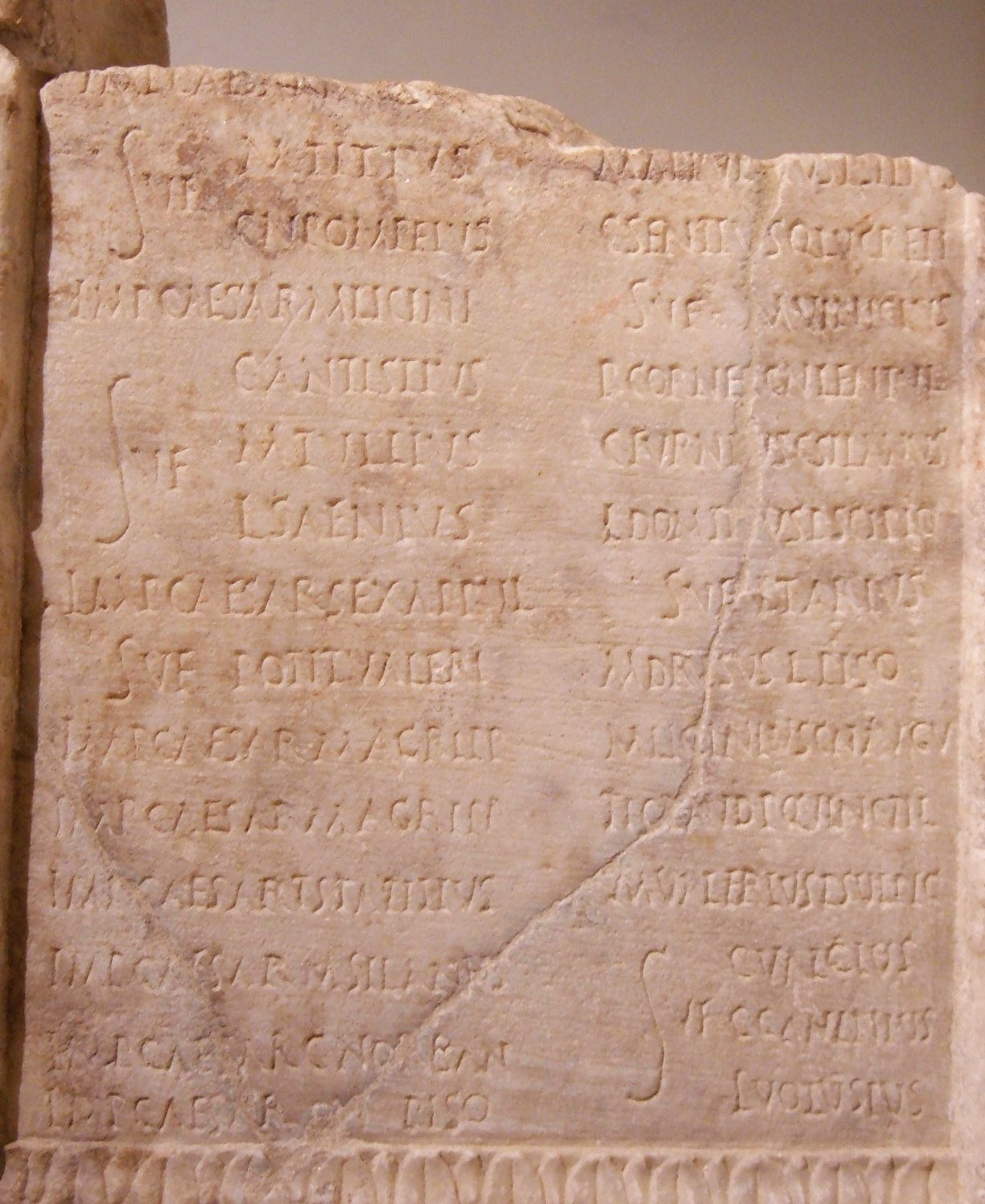
Imperial-era consular fasti listing several Aemilii

The gens Aemilia, originally written Aimilia, was one of the greatest patrician families at ancient Rome. The gens was of great antiquity, and claimed descent from Numa Pompilius, the second King of Rome. Its members held the highest offices of the state, from the early decades of the Republic to imperial times. The Aemilii were almost certainly one of the gentes maiores, the most important of the patrician families. Their name was associated with three major roads (the Via Aemilia, the Via Aemilia Scauri, and the Via Aemilia in Hirpinis), an administrative region of Italy, and the Basilica Aemilia at Rome.

== Origin ==
Several stories were told of the foundation of the Aemilii, of which the most familiar was that their ancestor, Mamercus, was the son of Numa Pompilius. In the late Republic, several other gentes claimed descent from Numa, including the Pompilii, Pomponii, Calpurnii, and Pinarii. A variation of this account stated that Mamercus was the son of Pythagoras, who was sometimes said to have taught Numa. However, as Livy observed, this was not possible, as Pythagoras was not born until more than a century after Numa's death, and was still living in the early days of the Republic.

This Mamercus is said to have received the name of Aemilius because of the persuasiveness of his language (δι᾽ αἱμυλίαν λόγου), although such a derivation is certainly false etymology. A more likely derivation is from aemulus, "a rival". According to a different legend, the Aemilii were descended from Aemylos, a son of Ascanius, four hundred years before the time of Numa Pompilius. Still another version relates that the gens was descended from Amulius, the wicked uncle of Romulus and Remus, who deposed his brother Numitor to become king of Alba Longa.

In the late Republic, a number of minor families claimed descent from the figures of Rome's legendary past, including through otherwise unknown sons of Numa. Modern historians dismiss these as late inventions, but the claim of the Aemilii was much older, and there was no corresponding need to demonstrate the antiquity of a gens that was already prominent at the beginning of the Republic. In any case, the Aemilii, like Numa, were almost certainly of Sabine origin. The praenomen Mamercus is derived from Mamers, a god worshipped by the Sabelli of central and southern Italy, and usually regarded as the Sabellic form of Mars. At Rome, this name, and its diminutive, Mamercinus, were known primarily as cognomina of the Aemilii and the Pinarii, although the Aemilii continued to use it as a praenomen. A surname of the later Aemilii, Regillus, seems to be derived from the Sabine town of Regillum, better known as the ancestral home of the Claudia gens, and perhaps alludes to the Sabine origin of the Aemilii.

The roots of the Aemilia gens was also connected to the very founding of Rome through the claim that it descended from Aemilia, the daughter of Aeneas and Lavinia.

== Praenomina ==
The Aemilii regularly used the praenomina Lucius, Manius, Marcus, and Quintus, and occasionally Mamercus. The Aemilii Mamercini also used Tiberius and Gaius, while the Aemilii Lepidi, who had a particular fondness for old and unusual names, used Paullus, presumably with reference to the family of the Aemilii Paulli, which had died out nearly a century earlier. An obscure family of uncertain date seems to have used Caeso. The daughters of the Aemilii are known to have used the numerical praenomina Prima, Secunda, and Tertia, although these were frequently treated as cognomina, and placed at the end of the name.

== Branches and cognomina ==
The oldest stirps of the Aemilii bore the surname Mamercus, together with its diminutive, Mamercinus; these appear somewhat interchangeably in early generations. This family flourished from the earliest period to the time of the Samnite Wars. Several other important families, with the surnames Papus, Barbula, Paullus, and Lepidus, date from this period, and were probably descended from the Mamercini. The most illustrious of the family was undoubtedly Mamercus Aemilius Mamercinus, three times dictator in the second half of the fifth century BC.

The Aemilii Papi occur in history for about a century and a half, from the time of the Samnite Wars down to the early second century BC. Their surname, Papus, like Mamercus, appears to be of Oscan origin. The name Aemilius Papus occurs again in the time of the emperor Hadrian, but properly speaking these appear to have belonged to the Messia gens, and probably claimed descent from the more illustrious Aemilii through a female line.

Barbula, or "little beard", occurs as the surname of one branch of the Aemilii, which appears in history for about a century beginning in the time of the Samnite Wars, and accounting for several consulships.

Paullus, occasionally found as Paulus, was an old praenomen, meaning "little". As a praenomen, its masculine form had fallen into disuse at Rome, although the feminine form, Paulla, in various orthographies, (Note: In addition to Paulla, the form Polla, was common in Latin, and either could be spelled with one 'l' or two. There were three distinct pronunciations of the vowel, which can be seen from Greek inscriptions, including Παυλλα, Πολλα, and Πωλα. The same variation was probably characteristic of the masculine Paullus, as with other Latin names, such as Claudius, which was frequently spelled Clodius, although this came to be regarded as a plebeian spelling.) was very common. As a surname, Paullus appeared in many families down to the latest period of the Empire, but none were more famous than the Aemilii Paulli. This family was descended from Marcus Aemilius Paullus, consul in 302 BC, and vanished with the death of Lucius Aemilius Paullus, the conqueror of Macedonia, in 160 BC. His sons, though grown, were adopted into the families of the Fabii Maximi and the Cornelii Scipiones. The Aemilii Lepidi revived the name toward the end of the Republic, when it was fashionable for younger branches of aristocratic families to revive the surnames of older, more illustrious stirpes.

The cognomen Lepidus belongs to a class of surnames derived from the habits of the habits of the bearer, and evidently referred to someone with a pleasant demeanor. The Aemilii Lepidi appear only a generation after the Aemilii Paulli, beginning with Marcus Aemilius Lepidus, consul in 285 BC, and produced many illustrious statesmen down to the first century AD. In the final decades of the Republic, they revived a number of names originally belonging to older stirpes of the Aemilian gens, including Mamercus as a praenomen, Regillus as a cognomen, and Paullus as both. The last generations were related by marriage to the imperial family.

The Aemilii Scauri flourished from the beginning of the second century BC to the beginning of the first century AD. Their surname, Scaurus, referred to the appearance of the feet or ankles; Chase suggests "swollen ankles".

The cognomina Regillus and Buca apparently belonged to short-lived families. Regillus appears to be derived from the Sabine town of Regillum, perhaps alluding to the Sabine origin of the gens. The Aemilii Regilli flourished for about two generations, beginning at the time of the Second Punic War. Buca, probably the same as Bucca, referred to someone with prominent cheeks, or perhaps someone known for shouting or wailing. The Aemilii Buci are known chiefly from coins, and seem to have flourished toward the end of the Republic.

As with other prominent gentes of the Republic, there were some Aemilii whose relationship to the major families is unclear, as the only references to them contain no surname. Some of these may have been descended from freedmen, and been plebeians. Aemilii with a variety of surnames are found in imperial times.

== Members ==
This list includes abbreviated praenomina. For an explanation of this practice, see filiation.

=== Aemilii Mamerci et Mamercini ===
- Mamercus Aemilius, father of the consul in 484, 478, and 473.
- Lucius Aemilius Mam. f. Mamercus, consul in 484, 478, and 473 BC.
- Tiberius Aemilius L. f. Mam. n. Mamercus, consul in 470 and 467 BC.
- Gaius Aemilius Mamercus, dictator in 463 BC, according to Lydus, but found in no other sources; perhaps an interrex.
- Mamercus Aemilius M. f. Mamercinus, dictator in 438, 433, and 426 BC.
- Manius Aemilius Mam. f. M. n. Mamercinus, consul in 410 BC, and consular tribune in 405, 403, and 401.
- Gaius Aemilius Ti. f. Ti. n. Mamercinus, consular tribune in 394 and 391 BC.
- Lucius Aemilius Mam. f. M. n. Mamercinus, consular tribune in 391, 389, 387, 383, 382, and 380 BC.
- Lucius Aemilius L. f. Mam. n. Mamercinus, consular tribune in 377 BC, magister equitum in 368 and probably also in 352, consul in 366 and 363, and interrex in 355.
- Lucius Aemilius L. f. L. n. Mamercinus Privernas, consul in 341 and 329 BC, and dictator in 335 and 316 BC.
- Tiberius Aemilius Ti. f. Ti. n. Mamercinus, praetor in 341 and consul in 339 BC.

=== Aemilii Papi ===
- Marcus Aemilius Papus, dictator in 321 BC.
- Quintus Aemilius (Cn. f.) Papus, consul in 282 and 278 BC.
- Lucius Aemilius Q. f. Cn. n. Papus, consul in 225 BC.
- Marcus Aemilius Papus, curio maximus, died in 210 BC.
- Lucius Aemilius Papus, praetor in 205 BC, received Sicily as his province.
- Marcus Messius Rusticus Aemilius Papus, father of the consul of AD 135, and a comes of the Emperor Hadrian.
- Marcus Cutius Priscus Messius M. f. Rusticus Aemilius Papus Arrius Proculus Julius Celsus, consul in AD 135.
- Marcus Messius M. f. Rusticus Aemilius Afer Cutius, brother of the consul of AD 135.

=== Aemilii Barbulae ===
- Quintus Aemilius Q. f. L. n. Barbula, consul in 317 and 311 BC.
- Marcus Aemilius Q. f. L. n. Barbula, dictator in an uncertain year between 292 and 284 BC, probably 286 or 285, according to Fronda.
- Lucius Aemilius Q. f. Q. n. Barbula, consul in 281 BC, and conqueror of Tarentum.
- Marcus Aemilius L. f. Q. n. Barbula, consul in 230 BC.

=== Aemilii Paulli ===
- Marcus Aemilius L. f. L. n. Paullus, consul in 302 BC, defeated Cleonymus of Sparta. The following year he was appointed magister equitum by the dictator Fabius Rullianus, who sent him against the Etruscans, but Aemilius was defeated.
- Marcus Aemilius M. f. L. n. Paullus, consul in 255 BC, during the First Punic War. He and his colleague, Servius Fulvius Paetinus Nobilior, led a Roman fleet to Africa, and won an important naval victory over the Carthaginians, but much of their fleet was wrecked in a storm on their return.
- Lucius Aemilius M. f. M. n. Paullus, consul in 219, triumphed over the Illyrians. Consul for the second time in 216 BC, early in the Second Punic War, he opposed engaging Hannibal at the Cannae, but fought bravely and was slain in battle.
- Lucius Aemilius L. f. M. n. Paullus, afterward surnamed Macedonicus, consul in 182 and 168 BC. The most illustrious of his family, he triumphed over Perseus of Macedon in 167 BC; but his two elder sons were adopted into other gentes, and his younger sons died within days of his triumph, leaving no sons to carry on his name.
- Tertia Aemilia L. f. M. n. Paulla, the sister of Macedonicus, married Scipio Africanus, the conqueror of Hannibal. Her daughter, Cornelia, was the mother of the Gracchi, and when she died, her property passed to her adoptive grandson, who was also her nephew, Scipio Aemilianus.
- Lucius Aemilius L. f. L. n. Paullus, afterward Quintus Fabius Q. f. Q. n. Maximus Aemilianus, the eldest son of Macedonicus, he was adopted into the Fabia gens.
- Aemilius L. f. L. n. Paullus, afterward Publius Cornelius Scipio Aemilianus, was the second son of Macedonicus, and was adopted by his cousin, Publius Cornelius Scipio, whose father had defeated Hannibal. Aemilianus was consul in 147 and 134 BC.
- Prima Aemilia L. f. L. n. Paulla, married Quintus Aelius Tubero, who served under her father, Macedonicus, in the war with Perseus.
- Secunda Aemilia L. f. L. n. Paulla, married Marcus Porcius Cato Licinianus, who also served under his father-in-law in the war with Perseus.
- Tertia Aemilia L. f. L. n. Paulla, when a little girl, gave her father a favorable omen, when following his election as consul for 168 BC, in order to conduct the war with Perseus, he returned home to find Aemilia crying because her dog, also named Perseus, had died.
- Aemilius L. f. L. n. Paullus, the elder of two sons of Macedonicus by his second wife, died at the age of fourteen, three days after his father's triumph in November of 167 BC.
- Aemilius L. f. L. n. Paullus, the youngest son of Macedonicus, died at the age of twelve, five days before his father's triumph.

=== Aemilii Lepidi ===
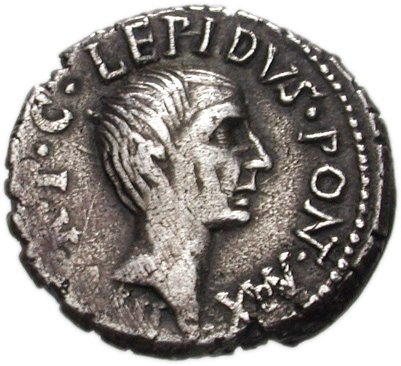
Obverse of a denarius of Marcus Aemilius Lepidus, the triumvir

- Marcus Aemilius Lepidus, consul in 285 BC.
- Marcus Aemilius M. f. M. n. Lepidus, consul in 232 BC, and perhaps consul suffectus in 222.
- Marcus Aemilius M. f. M. n. Lepidus, praetor in 218 BC. (Note: Klebs and Sumner tentatively identified him with the praetor peregrinus in 213 BC. Broughton was less certain, suggesting instead an identification with the curio maximus M. Aemilius Papus.) After his father's death in 216, he and his brothers, Lucius and Quintus, celebrated funeral games in his honour.
- Lucius Aemilius M. f. M. n. Lepidus, in 216 BC, joined with his brothers, Marcus and Quintus, in celebrating funeral games in honour of their father, the consul of 232 BC.
- Quintus Aemilius M. f. M. n. Lepidus, in 216 BC joined with his brothers, Lucius and Marcus, in celebrating funeral games in honour of their father, the consul of 232 BC.
- Marcus Aemilius M. f. M. n. Lepidus, consul in 187 and 175 BC, and censor in 179. He was Pontifex Maximus from 180 until his death in 152, and repeatedly chosen as Princeps Senatus.
- Marcus Aemilius M. f. M. n. Lepidus, one of the military tribunes who fought against Antiochus III in 190 BC.
- Marcus Aemilius M'. f. M'. n. Lepidus, consul in 158 BC.
- Marcus Aemilius M. f. M. n. Lepidus Porcina, consul in 137 BC.
- Marcus Aemilius M. f. M. n. Lepidus, consul in 126 BC.
- Quintus Aemilius M. f. M. n. Lepidus, brother of Marcus, the consul of 126 BC, and probably the grandson of Marcus, the military tribune of 190 BC.
- Marcus Aemilius Q. f. M. n. Lepidus, consul in 78 BC.
- Mamercus Aemilius Mam. f. M. n. Livianus, consul in 77 BC.
- Manius Aemilius M'. f. Lepidus, consul in 66 BC.
- Lucius Aemilius M. f. Q. n. Paullus, consul in 50 BC.
- Marcus Aemilius M. f. Q. n. Lepidus, the triumvir, consul in 46 and 42 BC.
- Aemilius (M. Lepidi f. Q. n.) Regillus, mentioned by Cicero.
- Publius Aemilius P. f. Lepidus, (Note: Identified as Manius Aemilius Lepidus, the son of Manius, in Drumann; also formerly read as "Publius Licinius".) proquaestor of Crete and Cyrenaica in 43 and 42 BC.
- Paullus Aemilius L. f. M. n. Lepidus, consul suffectus in 34 BC.
- Marcus Aemilius M. f. M. n. Lepidus, son of the triumvir, conspired to assassinate Octavian in 30 BC.
- Quintus Aemilius M'. f. M'. n. Lepidus, consul in 21 BC.
- Lucius Aemilius Paulli f. L. n. Paullus, consul in AD 1, conspired against Augustus.
- Marcus Aemilius Paulli f. L. n. Lepidus, consul in AD 6.
- Aemilia Paulli f. L. n. Lepida, the daughter of Paullus Aemilius Lepidus, the consul of 34 BC.
- Manius Aemilius Q. f. M. n. Lepidus, consul in AD 11.
- Aemilia Q. f. Lepida, wife of Publius Sulpicius Quirinus, accused of various crimes and condemned in AD 20.
- Marcus Aemilius L. f. Paulli n. Lepidus, put to death by Caligula in AD 39.
- Aemilia L. f. Paulli n. Lepida, the first wife of Tiberius Claudius Drusus.
- Aemilia M. f. Paulli n. Lepida, the wife of Drusus Caesar.

=== Aemilii Regilli ===
- Marcus Aemilius Regillus, Flamen Quirinalis and unsuccessful candidate for the consulship in 214 BC.
- Lucius Aemilius (M. f.) Regillus, praetor in 190 BC, during the war against Antiochus III.
- Marcus Aemilius (M. f.) Regillus, brother of Lucius Aemilius Regillus, died in the course of the war against Antiochus, in 190 BC.

=== Aemilii Scauri ===
- Marcus Aemilius M. f. L. n. Scaurus, consul in 115, (Note: Several sources indicate that he was consul a second time in 107, in place of Lucius Cassius Longinus, who fell in battle against the Tigurini. However, Pauly–Wissowa indicates that this is a phantom consulship, arising from a misplaced fragment of the Fasti Capitolini, identifying a consul Scaurus who should instead be identified with Marcus Aurelius Scaurus, consul suffectus in the preceding year.) censor in 109, and princeps senatus.
- Aemilia M. f. M. n., daughter of the princeps senatus, was compelled by her stepfather, Sulla, and mother, to divorce her first husband, Manius Acilius Glabrio, from whom she was pregnant, to marry Sulla's supporter, Pompey. She died in childbirth at Pompey's house.
- Marcus Aemilius M. f. M. n. Scaurus, praetor in 56 BC.
- Aemilius M. f. M. n. Scaurus, fought against the Cimbri under Lutatius Catulus.
- Marcus Aemilius M. f. M. n. Scaurus, supporter of Marcus Antonius.
- Mamercus Aemilius M. f. M. n. Scaurus, orator and poet, twice accused of majestas.

=== Aemilii Bucae ===
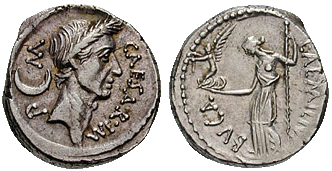
Denarius issued by Aemilius Buca the moneyer, depicting the laureate head of Julius Caesar, and on the reverse Venus holding Victoria and sceptre

- Lucius Aemilius Buca, quaestor in the time of Lucius Cornelius Sulla.
- Lucius Aemilius L. f. Buca, triumvir of the mint in 54 BC.

=== Others ===
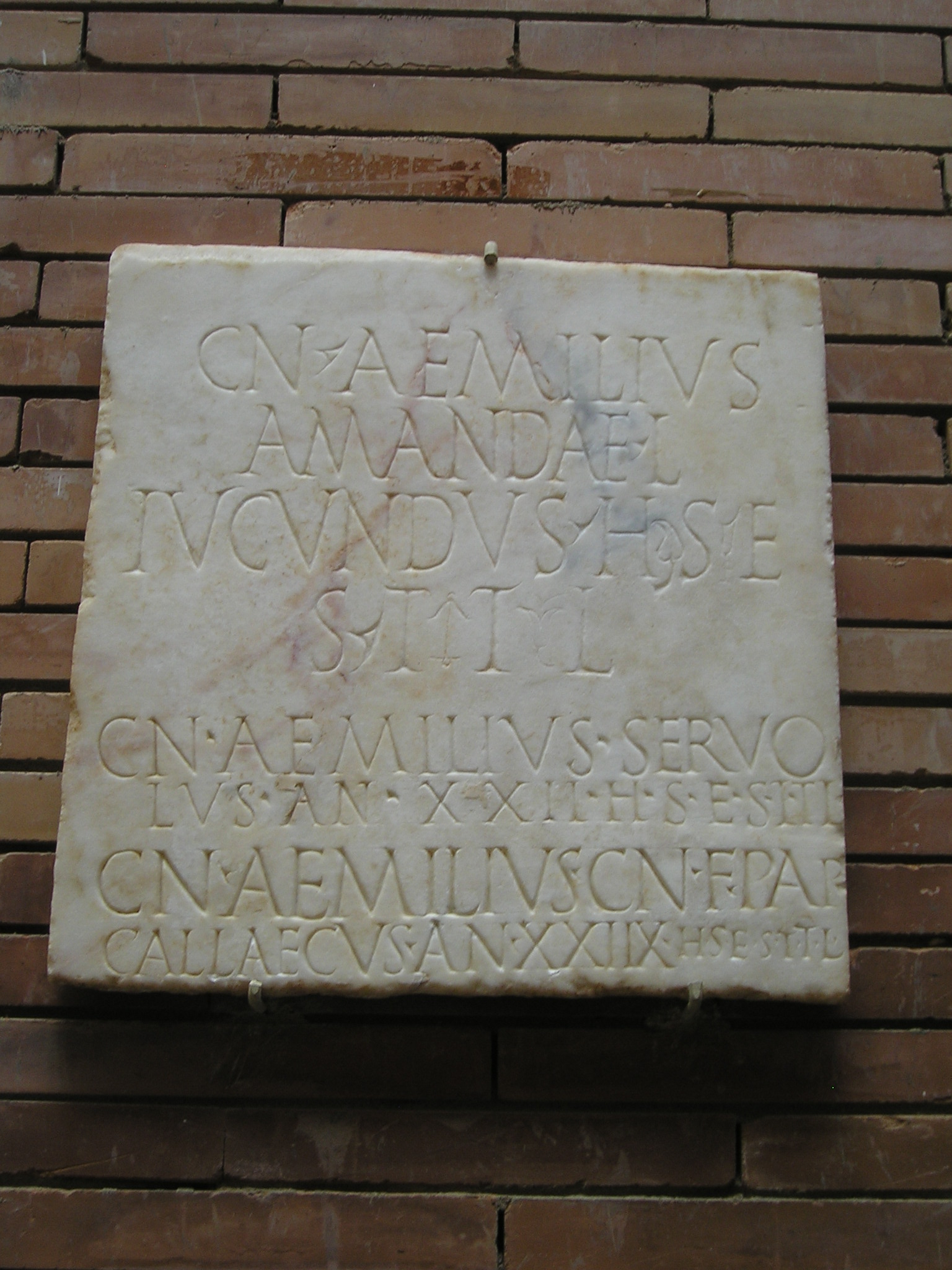
Gravestone of freedmen (liberti) with the nomen Aemilius, from Emerita Augusta, Roman Spain

- Aemilia, a Vestal Virgin, who miraculously rekindled the sacred flame with a piece of her garment.
- Aemilia, a Vestal put to death on the charge of incest in 114 BC. Two others, Marcia and Licinia, were acquitted, on the grounds that Aemilia had instigated the crime, but they were condemned to death by Lucius Cassius Longinus Ravilla.
- Caeso Aemilius K. f. Varrius, a military engineer of uncertain date.
- Marcus Aemilius Avianus, a friend of Cicero, and the patron of Avianus Evander and Avianus Hammonius.
- Aemilius Macer, a poet who flourished during the early decades of the Empire, and wrote upon the subjects of birds, snakes, and medicinal plants.
- Aemilius Macer of Verona, a poet who wrote upon Homeric subjects. He flourished toward the end of the reign of Augustus.
- Quintus Aemilius Secundus, an auxiliary prefect who carried out a census of the district of Apamea, Judaea. He then defeated the Itureans on mount Lebanon.
- Aemilius Rectus, governor of Egypt in AD 15, was rebuked by Tiberius for returning more money to the treasury than had been requested; Tiberius replied that he wanted the governors to shear his sheep, not shave them.
- Aemilius Sura, annalist, probably a contemporary of Velleius Paterculus.
- Aemilius Rufus, prefect of the cavalry under Gnaeus Domitius Corbulo in Armenia.
- Lucius Aemilius Rectus, governor of Egypt from AD 41 to 42; possibly son of the elder Aemilius Rectus.
- Aemilius Pacensis, tribune of the city cohorts at the death of Nero in AD 69; perished fighting against Aulus Vitellius.
- Aemilius Asper, a late first century grammarian, and commentator on Terence and Virgil.
- Sextus Aemilius Equester, consul suffectus at some point between 147 and 156, and afterwards governor of Dalmatia.
- Aemilius Asper Junior, a grammarian who flourished during the second century, and the author of Ars Grammatica.
- Quintus Aemilius Laetus, Praetorian Prefect under Commodus.
- Quintus Aemilius Saturninus, governor of Egypt from AD 197 to 200.
- Aemilius Macer, a jurist who lived in the time of Severus Alexander.
- Marcus Aemilius Aemilianus, governor of Pannonia and Moesia, was proclaimed Emperor in 253, but slain by his soldiers.
- Aemilius Papinianus, a jurist of the late second and early third century.
- Aemilius Rusticianus, governor of Egypt around AD 298.
- Aemilius Magnus Arborius, a fourth-century poet, and a friend of the brothers of Constantine I.
- Aemilius Parthenianus, a historian who gave an account of the various persons who aspired to the tyranny (known only from references in Historia Augusta and so is suspected to be fictitious).
- Aemilius Probus, grammarian of the late fourth century, to whom the Excellentium Imperatorum Vitae of Cornelius Nepos was erroneously attributed.
- Blossius Aemilius Dracontius, a fifth-century Christian poet.

== See also ==
- List of Roman gentes
- Aemilius (disambiguation)
- Basilica Aemilia

== Bibliography ==
- Polybius, Historiae (The Histories).
- Marcus Tullius Cicero, De Divinatione.
- Diodorus Siculus, Bibliotheca Historica (Library of History).
- Quintus Horatius Flaccus (Horace), Carmen Saeculare.
- Dionysius of Halicarnassus, Romaike Archaiologia (Roman Antiquities).
- Titus Livius (Livy), History of Rome.
- Marcus Velleius Paterculus, Compendium of Roman History.
- Valerius Maximus, Factorum ac Dictorum Memorabilium (Memorable Facts and Sayings).
- Quintus Asconius Pedianus, Commentarius in Oratio Ciceronis Pro Milone (Commentary on Cicero's Oration Pro Milone).
- Lucius Mestrius Plutarchus (Plutarch), Lives of the Noble Greeks and Romans; Moralia, including "Quaestiones Romanae" (Roman Questions).
- Appianus Alexandrinus (Appian), Bella Illyrica (The Illyrian Wars).
- Lucius Cassius Dio Cocceianus (Cassius Dio), Roman History.
- Eutropius, Breviarium Historiae Romanae (Abridgement of the History of Rome).
- Paulus Orosius, Historiarum Adversum Paganos (History Against the Pagans).
- Sextus Aurelius Victor, De Viris Illustribus (On Famous Men).
- Joannes Zonaras, Epitome Historiarum (Epitome of History).
- Johann Caspar von Orelli, Onomasticon Tullianum, Orell Füssli, Zürich (1826–1838).
- Barthold Georg Niebuhr, The History of Rome, Julius Charles Hare and Connop Thirlwall, trans., John Smith, Cambridge (1828).
- August Wilhelm Ferdinand Krause, Vitae et Fragmenta Veterum Historicorum Romanorum (Lives and Fragments of Ancient Roman Historians), Ferdinand Dümmler, Berlin (1833).
- Wilhelm Drumann, Geschichte Roms in seinem Übergang von der republikanischen zur monarchischen Verfassung, oder: Pompeius, Caesar, Cicero und ihre Zeitgenossen, Königsberg (1834–1844).
- Thomas Arnold, History of Rome, B. Fellowes, London (1838–1842).
- Dictionary of Greek and Roman Biography and Mythology, William Smith, ed., Little, Brown and Company, Boston (1849).
- August Pauly, Georg Wissowa, et alii, Realencyclopädie der Classischen Altertumswissenschaft (Scientific Encyclopedia of the Knowledge of Classical Antiquities, abbreviated RE or PW), J. B. Metzler, Stuttgart (1894–1980).
- George Davis Chase, "The Origin of Roman Praenomina", in Harvard Studies in Classical Philology, vol. VIII (1897).
- Friedrich Munzer, Roman Aristocratic Parties and Families (1920).
- T. Robert S. Broughton, The Magistrates of the Roman Republic, American Philological Association (1952).
- Sumner, G.V. (1973). The Orators in Cicero's Brutus: Prosopography and Chronology. University of Toronto Press. ISBN 0-8020-5281-9.
- Anthony R. Birley, The Fasti of Roman Britain, Clarendon Press (1981).
- Mika Kajava, Roman Female Praenomina: Studies in the Nomenclature of Roman Women, Acta Instituti Romani Finlandiae (1994).
- Timothy J. Cornell, The Beginnings of Rome: Italy and Rome from the Bronze Age to the Punic Wars (c. 1000–264 BC), Routledge, London (1995).
- John C. Traupman, The New College Latin & English Dictionary, Bantam Books, New York (1995).
- Patrick Tansey, "Q. Aemilius Lepidus (Barbula?) Cos. 21 B.C.", in Historia: Zeitschrift für Alte Geschichte, vol. 57, No. 2, pp. 174–207 (2008), JSTOR 25598428.
