= Gaius Vettius Sabinianus Julius Hospes =

2nd century Roman senator, general and consul

Consul of the Roman Republic
- Incumbent
- Assumed office 175 or 176

Personal details
- Born: Roman North Africa

Military service
- Allegiance: Roman Empire
- Commands: Governor of Dalmatia; Governor of Dacia; Governor of Pannonia Superior; Governor of Africa

Gaius Vettius Sabinianus Julius Hospes (fl. 2nd century) was a Roman military officer and senator. He was born into the equestrian order, possibly in North Africa. He held the traditional series of military, administrative and judicial positions of steadily increasing responsibility which aspiring upper class Romans were expected to progress through, known as the cursus honorum. He had a long and distinguished military and political career under the reigns of the emperors Antoninus Pius, Marcus Aurelius and Commodus.

He was appointed a special representative of the Emperor on several occasions. He was governor successively of four turbulent Roman frontier provinces. He acquired a reputation as a capable, if brutal, military commander and suppressed a number of internal and external threats. He was used by the emperors he served under as something of a trouble shooter. He was appointed consul in AD 175 or 176 by Emperor Marcus Aurelius as a reward for his loyalty and ability during a revolt by General Avidius Cassius. Hospes received numerous awards for personal gallantry.

== Biography ==
=== Early career ===
Originally a member of the equestrian order, Gaius Vettius Sabinianus may have originated from Roman North Africa. At some point he was adopted by the aristocratic Vettii Sabini. He began his military career as the praefectus cohortis, a junior officer position, of II Commagenorum, a battalion sized army unit. He was promoted to the rank of military tribune, a senior officer position, in Legio I Italica. Sabinianus returned to Rome to participate in the magistracies of the cursus honorum, the sequential mixture of military and political administrative positions held by aspiring politicians in the early Roman Empire. In succession he was appointed: quaestor, a junior position administering the public treasury; plebeian tribune, a senior position with – in theory – extensive powers over the legislature; and praetor, a senior administrative and judicial position reporting directly to the emperor. He was then appointed legatus of the proconsular governor of Asia. Vettius Sabinianus’ next appointment was a special command, functioning as the imperial legate responsible for investigating the status of the Cyclades in relation to their administration by the Roman province of Asia.

=== Later career ===
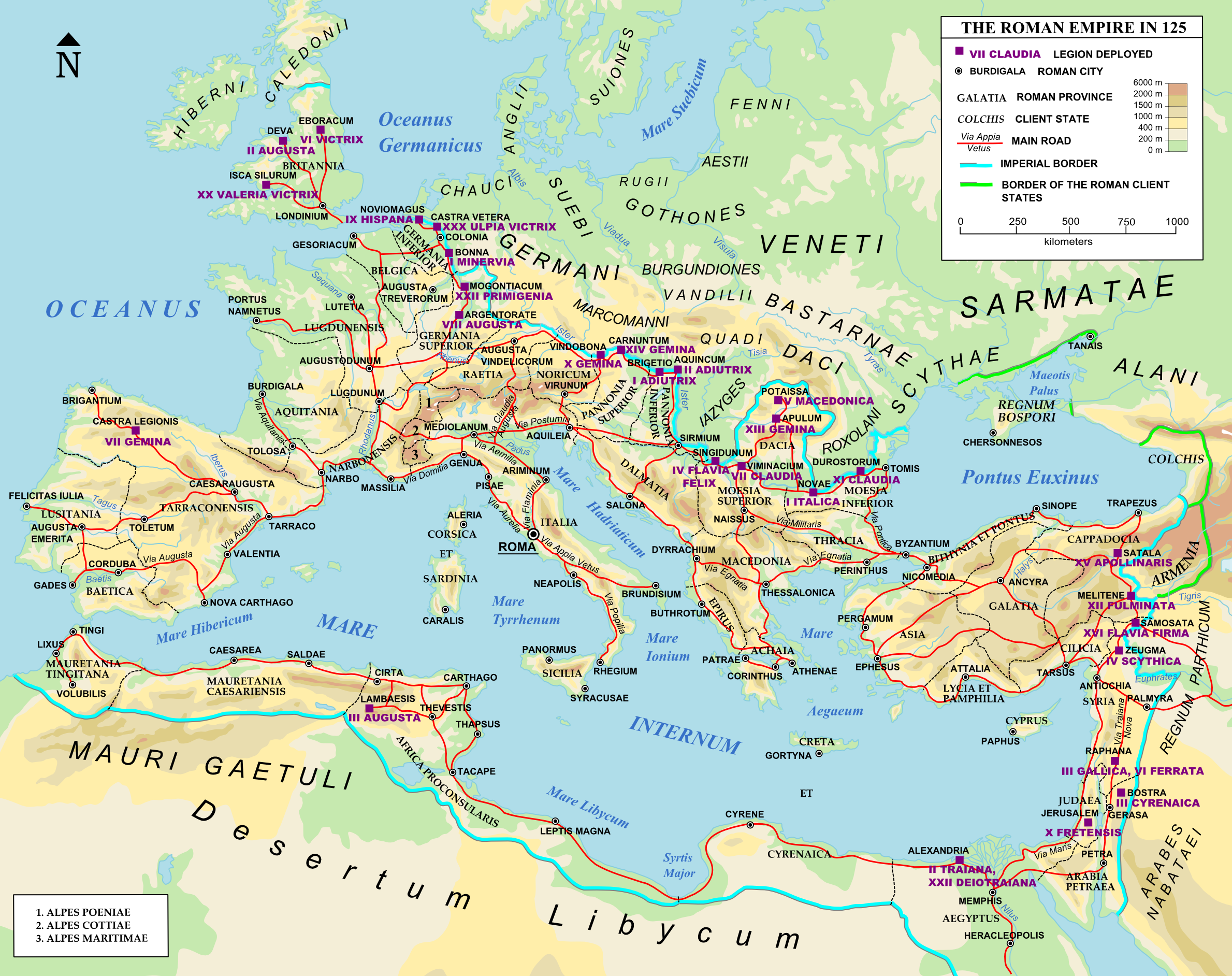
Roman Empire at the time of Vettius Sabinianus

At the beginning of the joint reigns of Marcus Aurelius and Lucius Verus, Sabinianus was appointed juridicus of the Italian circuit comprising Aemilia; Etruria and Liguria; Mireille Corbier states he is the earliest known juridicus for that circuit. Around 165 Emperor Marcus Aurelius raised a new legion, Legio III Italica, to fight in the Marcomannic Wars and Sabinianus was appointed its first commander as a legatus legionis, senior legionary commander. This was followed by another special appointment, as Legatus Aug. Rationibus putandis trium Galliarum or legate in control of the urban finances of the three Gallic provinces, again reporting directly to the Emperor. This appointment may reflect a growing debt problem in the province, triggered by the demands of the Marcomannic Wars. His next appointment was legatus legionis of another legion, XIV Gemina, together with military and civil jurisdiction over Pannonia Superior, following a Roman defeat in the province in about 170 and the death of the governor. After a brief period in Rome as praefect of the aerarium Saturni (state treasury), he was again posted to the frontier, this time as legatus Augusti pro praetore, imperial governor, of Pannonia Superior, where he served from around 170 to 175. Here he fought in the First Marcomannic War, taking part in several battles against Germanic tribes. For his services Marcus Aurelius rewarded him with a large share of the booty from the campaign.

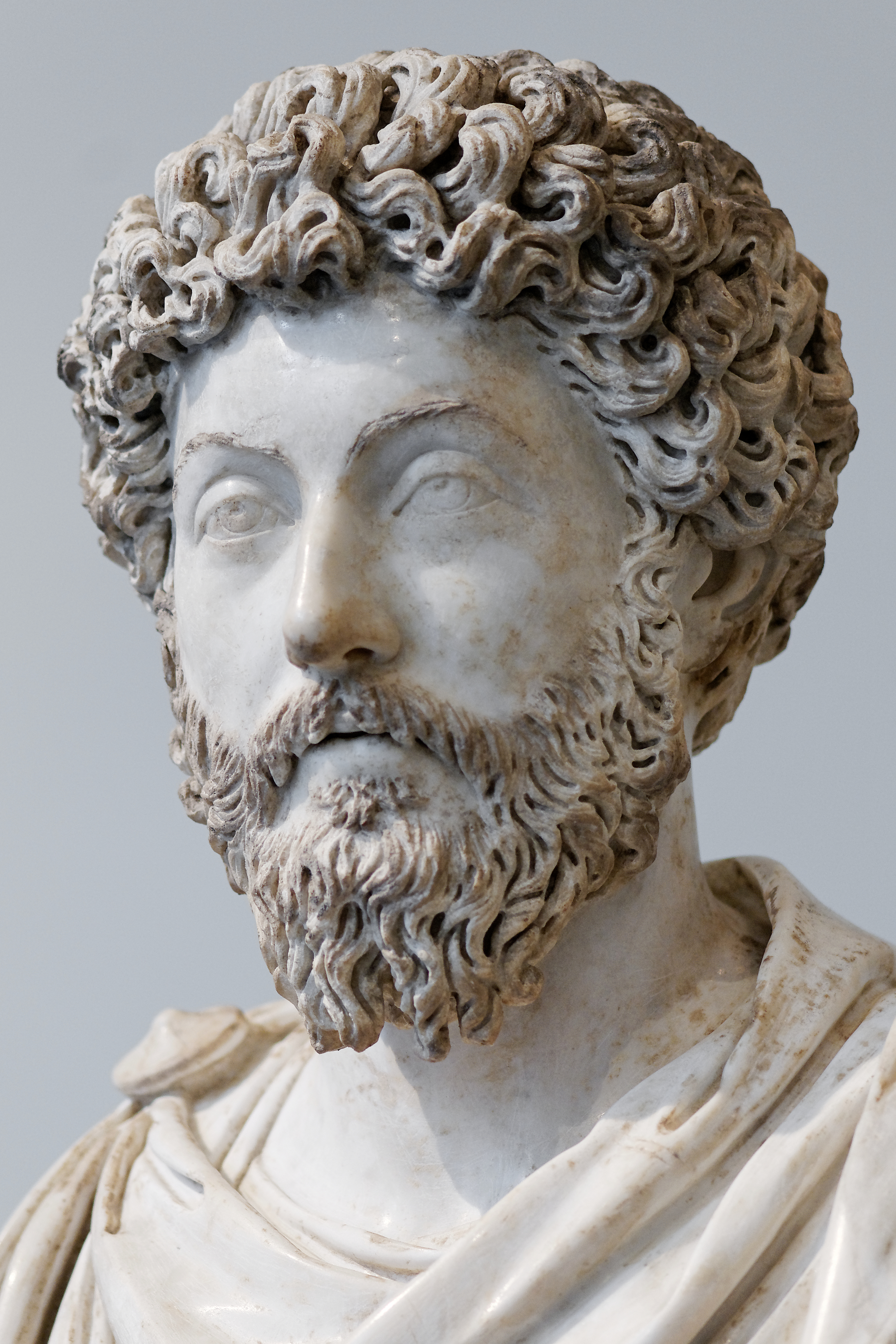
The emperor Marcus Aurelius, whom Vettius Sabinianus loyally supported during the rebellion of Avidius Cassius.

During the usurpation of Avidius Cassius in AD 175, Vettius Sabinianus was sent by Marcus Aurelius to take charge of the vexillations (detachments) from Illyricum and defend Rome against a possible advance by Cassius. Positioning himself in Rome, Sabinianus also had to ensure that those within the city opposed to the continued war against the Germans, headed by the family of Lucius Verus, did not take advantage of Cassius' rebellion to undermine imperial authority. As a reward for his loyalty during the crisis, Vettius Sabinianus was appointed consul by the emperor around AD 175. Becoming a consul was the highest honour of the Roman state, and as such candidates were chosen carefully by the emperor. He was then appointed proconsular curator of Puteoli, followed by a tenure as curator aedium sacrarum, curator of the temples, a senior religious position. Next he was appointed legatus Augusti pro praetore (imperial legate) of Dalmatia in AD 177, with instructions to deal with the bandits which infested the areas around modern Albania and Montenegro, which the previous governor Didius Julianus had been unable to eradicate.

From 179 to 182 Vettius Sabinianus held the post of imperial governor of Tres Daciae, during which he subdued some 12,000 Free Dacians on the border of the province and settled them inside the provincial border. He was probably the governor who fought in a victorious but brutal war against the Buri until 182, which saw the creation of a five-mile wide security zone along the borders of the province. This was followed by his posting as imperial legate of the province of Pannonia Superior. The last position Sabinianus is recorded to have held, in around AD 191, was proconsular governor of Africa which, because of the reliance of the city of Rome on its grain, was considered the most important Roman governorship.

=== Decorations and family ===
Vettius Sabinianus was awarded the civic crown, the second highest military decoration to which a Roman citizen could aspire, three times. (Note: Only the grass crown was held in higher regard.) A chaplet of common oak leaves woven to form a crown, it was reserved for Roman citizens who saved the lives of fellow citizens by slaying an enemy. He was also awarded the Hasta pura, a decoration for military valour and the Vexilla twice each. He was married to the daughter of Servius Cornelius Scipio Salvidienus Orfitus, proconsular governor of Africa in AD 163/164. His grandson was Gaius Vettius Gratus Sabinianus, who was consul in AD 221.

== Sources ==
- Alföldy, Géza Konsulat und Senatorenstand unter der Antoninen (1977) Bonn: Rudolf Habelt Verlag. ISBN 978-3-7749-1334-9
- Arnheim, Michael, The senatorial aristocracy in the later Roman empire (1972) Oxford: Clarendon. Press. OCLC 848446152
- Birley, Anthony, Marcus Aurelius (2000a) London: Routledge. ISBN 978-0-415-17125-0
- Birley, A. R., "Senators as Generals" in Kaiser, Heer und Gesellschaft in der Römischen Kaiserzeit (ed. Eric Birley, Géza Alföldy, Brian Dobson, Werner Eck) (2000b) Stuttgart: Steiner. ISBN 978-3-515-07654-8
- Buraselis, Kostas, Transactions of the American Philosophical Society. Vol. 90, pt. 4: Kos between Hellenism and Rome: Studies on the Political, Institutional and Social History of Kos from ca. the Middle Second Century B.C. until Late Antiquity (2000) Philadelphia American Philosophical Society. ISBN 978-0-87169-904-6
- Dumitrascu, Sever, "Research and Discovery in Northwest Rumania" in Rumanian Studies: An International Annual of the Humanities and Social Sciences, Vol III 1973 – 1975 (1976)
- Grant, Michael, The Antonines: The Roman Empire in Transition (1996) London: Routledge. ISBN 978-0-415-13814-7
- Kovács, Péter, Marcus Aurelius' Rain Miracle and the Marcomannic Wars (2009) Leiden: Brill. ISBN 978-90-474-4326-1
- Maxfield, Valerie, A., The Military Decorations of the Roman Army (1981) Berkeley (Calif.) University of California Press. ISBN 978-0-520-04499-9
- McLynn, Frank, Marcus Aurelius: Warrior, Philosopher, Emperor (2011) London: Vintage Digital, 2011. ISBN 978-1-4464-4933-2
- Mennen, Inge, Power and Status in the Roman Empire, AD 193–284 (2011) Leiden: Brill. ISBN 978-90-04-20359-4
- Potter, David S., The Roman Empire at Bay: AD 180–395 (2004) London: Routledge. ISBN 978-0-415-10058-8

Political offices
Preceded by Uncertain	Consul suffectus of the Roman Empire around 176	Succeeded by Uncertain
