= Pinaria gens =

Ancient Roman family

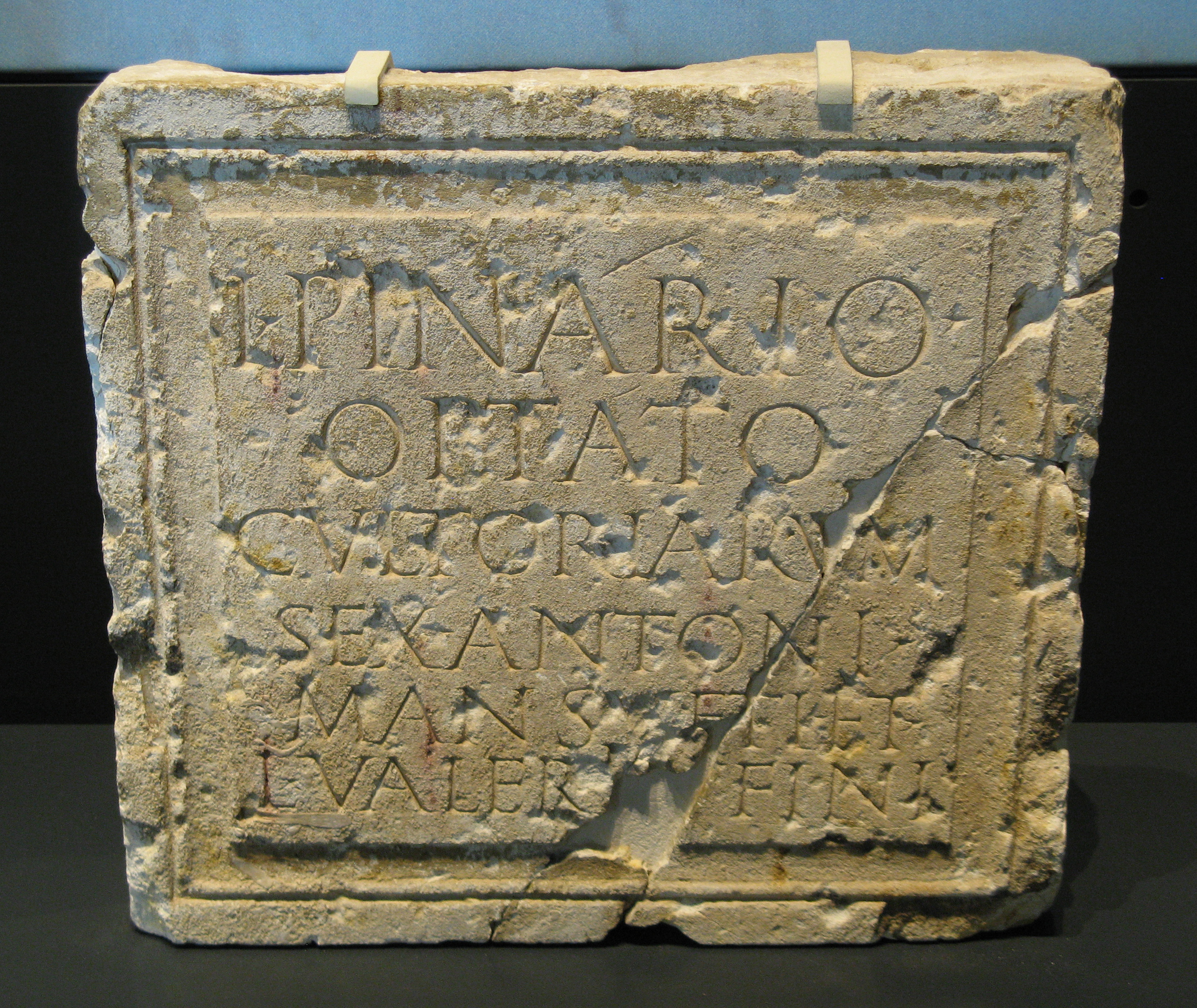
Funerary inscription of Lucius Pinarius Optatus, from Alba Helviorum, first century

The gens Pinaria was one of the most ancient patrician families at Rome. According to tradition, the gens originated long before the founding of the city. The Pinarii are mentioned under the kings, and members of this gens attained the highest offices of the Roman state soon after the establishment of the Republic, beginning with Publius Pinarius Mamercinus Rufus, consul in 489 BC.

== Origin ==
The origin of the Pinarii is related in two different traditions. The more famous of these held that a generation before the Trojan War, Hercules came to Italy, where he was received by the families of the Potitii and the Pinarii. He taught them a form of worship, and instructed them in the rites by which he was later honored; but due to the tardiness of the Pinarii to the sacrificial banquet, Hercules assigned them the subordinate position. For centuries, these families supplied the priests for the cult of Hercules, until nearly the entire Potitian gens perished in a plague at the end of the fourth century BC.

The extinction of the Potitii was frequently attributed to the actions of Appius Claudius Caecus, who in his censorship in 312 BC, directed the families to instruct public slaves in the performance of their sacred rites. Supposedly the Potitii were punished for their impiety in doing so, while the Pinarii refused to relinquish their office, which they held until the latest period. (Note: In some versions of the story, Claudius' blindness was a further punishment for inducing the Potitii to abandon their sacred duty. Although the traditional account is that the Potitii were utterly extinguished, leading some scholars to doubt their existence as a separate gens, at least one family of Potitii was known to Cicero, while another Potitius appears in an inscription dating to the early Empire.)

In the later Republic, it was sometimes asserted that the Pinarii were descended from Pinus, a son of Numa Pompilius, the second King of Rome. Several other families made similar claims; the Aemilii had long claimed to be descended from Mamercus, the son of Numa, while in later times the Pomponii and Calpurnii claimed to be descended from sons named Pompo and Calpus. Mamercus and Pompo were genuine praenomina of Sabine origin, like Numa himself, although Calpus and Pinus are not otherwise attested. The Marcii also claimed descent from Numa's grandson, Ancus Marcius, the fourth Roman king.

== Praenomina ==
The Pinarii of the early Republic used the praenomina Publius and Lucius. They are also thought to have used Mamercus, although no examples of this name as a praenomen amongst the Pinarii are found in ancient writers; however, the use of Mamercus or Mamercinus as a cognomen by the oldest family of the gens seems to prove that the praenomen was once used by the gens. In later times, some of the Pinarii bore the names Marcus and Titus.

== Branches and cognomina ==
The only family of the Pinarii mentioned in the early days of the Republic bore the cognomen Mamercinus. Later, the surnames of Natta, Posca, Rusca, and Scarpus appear, but no members of these families obtained the consulship. Natta and Scarpus are the only cognomina that occur on coins.

The family of the Pinarii Mamercini, all of whom bore the agnomen Rufus, meaning "red", derived their surname from the praenomen Mamercus, which must have been borne by an ancestor of the gens. In Greek authors, it is sometimes found as Mamertinus, apparently by analogy with the Mamertini, a group of Italian mercenaries.

Natta or Nacca, referring to a fuller, was the surname of an old and noble family of the Pinarii, which flourished from the fourth century BC into imperial times. Cicero mentions the family, and an ancient bronze statue of one of its members, which was struck by lightning in 65 BC.

== Members ==
This list includes abbreviated praenomina. For an explanation of this practice, see filiation.

=== Early Pinarii ===
- Publius Pinarius, father of the Vestal.
- Pinaria P. f., a Vestal Virgin put to death for violating her vow of chastity during the reign of Lucius Tarquinius Priscus.
- Pinarius, husband of Thalaea, whose quarrel with her mother-in-law, Gegania, during the reign of Lucius Tarquinius Superbus, is mentioned by Plutarch as a rare example of domestic disharmony in early Rome.

=== Pinarii Mamercini ===
- Publius Pinarius Mamercinus Rufus, consul in 489 BC.
- Lucius Pinarius Mamercinus Rufus, consul in 472 BC.
- Lucius Pinarius L. f. P. n. Mamercinus Rufus, consular tribune in 432 BC.

=== Pinarii Nattae ===
- Lucius Pinarius Natta, magister equitum in 363 BC, and praetor in 349.
- Lucius Pinarius Natta, brother-in-law of Publius Clodius Pulcher.
- Pinaria Natta, possible wife of Publius Clodius Pulcher.
- Pinarius Natta, a client of Sejanus, and one of the accusers of Aulus Cremutius Cordus in AD 25.
- (Pinarius) Natta, a person satirized by Horatius for his meanness.

=== Others ===
- Publius Pinarius, censor in 430 BC, levied heavy taxes, leading to the passage of a law allowing the payment of fines in coin instead of livestock.
- Lucius Pinarius, commander of the Roman garrison at Enna in 214 BC, during the Second Punic War, vigororously suppressed an attempted insurrection by the inhabitants.
- Marcus Pinarius Posca, praetor in 181 BC, obtained Sardinia as his province; he put down an insurrection on Corsica, and returning to Sardinia, he successfully carried on the war against the Ilienses.
- Marcus Pinarius Rusca, brought forward a lex annalis, which was opposed by Marcus Servilius; he is mentioned only by Cicero, and may perhaps have been the same person as Marcus Pinarius Posca.
- Titus Pinarius, ridiculed by the orator Gaius Julius Caesar Strabo, curule aedile in 90 BC.
- Pinarius, the husband of Julia Major, sister of the dictator Gaius Julius Caesar.
- Titus Pinarius, a friend of Cicero, mentioned several times in his letters.
- Lucius Pinarius, a grand-nephew of Caesar, who was named one of his heirs in his will. He later served in the army of the triumvirs during the war against Brutus and Cassius. He is likely the same person as Lucius Pinarius Scarpus, placed by Marcus Antonius over Cyrene shortly before the Battle of Actium, he submitted to Octavianus, and was subsequently given the command of Libya.
- Pinarius, an eques, put to death by order of Augustus.
- Gaius Pinarius Scarpus, a veteran soldier in either the Legio VII Claudia or the Legio VII Gemina, buried at Salona in Dalmatia, along with his son, in a tomb built by his freedwoman, Pinaria, dating between the latter half of the first century, and the first half of the second.
- Pinaria C. l., the freedwoman of Gaius Pinarius Scarpus, for whom she built a tomb at Salona, dating from the latter half of the first century, or the first half of the second.
- Gnaeus Pinarius Cornelius Clemens, consul suffectus during the reign of Vespasian.
- Gnaeus Pinarius Aemilius Cicatricula, consul suffectus in AD 72.
- Gnaeus Pinarius Cornelius Severus, consul suffectus in AD 112.

== Pinarii in popular culture ==
The Pinarii are the focus of the novels Roma, Empire, and Dominus by Steven Saylor. These novels follow the history of Rome, and concern the fortunes of the Potitii and Pinarii, through the passing down of a family heirloom. Most of the Pinarii depicted in the novels are fictional, though Saylor keeps to the known facts about the family.

== See also ==
- List of Roman gentes
