= Marcus Aemilius Papus =

Roman senator and suffect consul AD 135

Marcus Cutius Priscus Messius Rusticus Aemilius Papus Arrius Proculus Julius Celsus (known by the short name Marcus Aemilius Papus) was a Roman senator who held a series of offices in the emperor's service. He was suffect consul for the nundinium of May to August 135 as the colleague of Lucius Burbuleius Optatus Ligarianus. Papus is known solely through inscriptions.

Although Papus bears the gentilicium and cognomina of a distinguished Republican stirps, the Aemilii Papi, his connection is obscure; the previous attested member of the Republican family lived in the early third century BC. For the other elements in his name, "Messius Rusticus" is shared with his father, and presumably came as part of a legacy to his father from the consul of 114, Marcus Messius Rusticus; "Cutius Priscus" comes from his mother's family. However the origins of other elements in his name, "Arrius Proculus" and "Julius Celsus" are unknown. Details about his immediate family are more definite. His father was Marcus Messius Rusticus Aemilius Papus, and his mother Cutia Prisca; a brother is attested, Marcus Messius Rusticus Aemilius Afer Cutius, who died young. Elements in the name of a military tribune of Legio II Adiutrix, Gaius Julius Pisibanus Maximus Aemilius Papus, son of Gaius Julius Pisibanus, suffect consul in 141, suggests his mother (presumably named Aemilia Papa) is somehow related to Papus, either as his sister or his daughter.

== Career ==
His cursus honorum can be reconstructed from two inscriptions, one found at Callenses and dated to AD 128, the other found at Salpensa (near Utrera in modern Spain). His public career began with the quatraviri viarum curandorum, one of the four boards that comprise the vigintiviri; this board of four men was tasked with maintaining the city roads of Rome. This was followed by his commission as a military tribune with Legio III Augusta, stationed in Mauritania; Mireille Corbier dates this between the years 110 and 125. After completing three years with the legion, Papus advanced through the traditional Republican magistracies: quaestor, which he served in Africa, plebeian tribune, and peregrine praetor. Anthony Birley notes that despite his father's friendship with emperor Hadrian, Papus received no signs of special favor: he was never a candidatus of the emperor for any Republican magistracy, nor did he hold a major priesthood. The only such religious duty was as sodalis Augustalis.

Having achieved the rank of ex-praetor, Papus was then qualified to hold a number of substantial offices. The first was curator of the Via Aurelia, then legatus legionis or commander of Legio XX Valeria Victrix, then stationed in Roman Britain; this was the last office listed on the inscription dated to the year 128, and attests his command includes that year. He was then prefect of the aerarium Saturni, or the public treasury; in her monograph on the administration of Roman public finances, Corbier dates his tenure from the years 132 to 134. His consulate followed, and afterwards Papus is known to have held two more appointments in the emperor's service. The first was curator operum publicorum, which an inscription recovered from Rome attests he held on 13 December 138. He was then governor of Dalmatia; Géza Alföldy dates his tenure in that imperial province from the years 147 to 150.

Aemilius Papus fades from history at that point; since the minimum legal age for the consulate at this time was 40, and, when he stepped down from his administration of Dalmatia 15 years later, he was presumably at least 55 years old; it is possible Papus had died not long after.

Political offices
Preceded by Lucius Tutilius Lupercus Pontianus, and Publius Calpurnius Atilianus as ordinary consuls	Suffect consul of the Roman Empire; 135 with Lucius Burbuleius Optatus Ligarianus	Succeeded by Publius Rutilius Fabianus, and Gnaeus Papirius Aelianus as suffect consuls
