= Rasinia gens =

The gens Rasinia was an obscure plebeian family at ancient Rome. Hardly any members of this gens are mentioned in history, but a number are known from inscriptions. In imperial times a Gaius Rasinius Silo was governor of Noricum.

== Origin ==
From the large number of inscriptions mentioning the Rasinii in and around Etruria, and especially from Arretium and Pisae, as well as the surnames Pisanus and Pisaurensis, referring to members who were natives of Pisae and of the Etruscan colony at Pisaurum, it seems beyond doubt that the Rasinii were Etruscans, and that their nomen, Rasinius, must be derived from the Etruscan Rasenna, the Etruscan name for their own culture.

== Praenomina ==
The chief praenomina of the Rasinii were Lucius, Gaius, and Marcus, with Decimus and Sextus being used to a lesser extent. Lucius, Gaius, and Marcus were the three most common names throughout Roman history, while Sextus was fairly common, and Decimus somewhat more distinctive. Other names occur infrequently among the Rasinii, although examples of Publius, Quintus, and Titus are known.

== Members ==
This list includes abbreviated praenomina. For an explanation of this practice, see filiation.

- Rasinia, buried at Rome, in a tomb built by Publius Julius Trophimus, together with Marcus Rasinius Hermadio, Javolena Capitolina, and Javolena Sempronia.
- Rasinia, built a sepulchre at Rome for herself, her husband, Decimus Rasinius Celadus, her son, Decimus Rasinius Memor, Rasinia Aucta, a house slave, and Decimus Rasinius, a freedman.
- Rasinia, a freedwoman named in an inscription from Aquinum in Latium, together with Rufa Rasinia.
- Decimus Rasinius, a freedman buried in the family sepulchre built by Rasinia at Rome.
- Gaius Rasinius, a potter at Arretium in Etruria, whose works have been found all over the Roman world.
- Rufa Rasinia, named in an inscription from Aquinum, together with a freedwoman named Rasinia.
- Sextus Rasinius M. f., son of Marcus Rasinius Martialis, was buried at Thysdrus in Africa Proconsularis, aged two years, four months.
- Rasinius Amerimnus, built a tomb at Rome for himself and his daughter.
- Lucius Rasinius Antiochus, buried at Rome, together with Lucius Rasinius Daphnus, and two others.
- Rasinia Attica, daughter of Vesia Secunda, who built a tomb for her at Clusium in Etruria.
- Rasinia Aucta, a house-slave belonging to Rasinia, the wife of Decimus Rasinius Celadus, was buried in the family sepulchre at Rome, aged twenty-three.
- Publius Rasinius L. f. Bassus, named in two inscriptions from Pisae in Etruria, dating between AD 4 and 14.
- Rasinia Beronice, dedicated a monument at Rome to her daughter, Juventia Beronice, aged one year, eleven months, and four days.
- Rasinia Bithynia, buried at Rome, in a tomb built by Paccius Onesimus.
- Rasinia D. l. C[...], a freedwoman buried at Rome, together with another freedwoman of the same family.
- Sextus Rasinius Can[...], named in an inscription from Arretium.
- Lucius Rasinius Castus, buried at Lambaesis in Numidia, aged eighty-three years, five months.
- Decimus Rasinius Celadus, the husband of Rasinia, and father of Decimus Rasinius Memor, buried in the family sepulchre built by his wife at Rome.
- Lucius Rasinius Celer, buried at Masclianae in Africa Proconsularis, aged eighty-five, with a tomb built by his son, Quintus Rasinius Saturninus.
- Lucius Rasinius Cirus, named in inscriptions found at Felsina in Etruria, and at Gruissan, formerly part of Gallia Narbonensis.
- Lucius Rasinius Daphnus, buried at Rome, together with Lucius Rasinius Antiochus and two others.
- Lucius Rasinius Draucus, named in an inscription from Emporiae in Hispania Tarraconensis, and Caesaria in Mauretania Caesariensis.
- Lucius Rasinius Epicurus, buried at Rome, aged thirty.
- Lucius Rasinius Ger[manus?], known from inscriptions at Carthage in Africa Proconsularis, and Caesaria in Mauretania Caesariensis.
- Titus Rasinius Ger[manus?], known from an inscription from Volsinii in Etruria.
- Rasinia Glypte, built a monument at Rome for a slave, Pholoe, aged sixteen years, seven days.
- Rasinia D. l. H[...], a freedwoman buried at Rome, together with another freedwoman of the same family.
- Marcus Rasinius Hermadio, buried at Rome, in a tomb built by Publius Julius Trophimus, together with Rasinia, Javolena Capitolina, and Javolena Sempronia.
- Rasinia Hilaritas, named in an inscription from Volsinii.
- Gaius Rasinius Januarius, a cornicularius, or hornblower, in the century of Marcus Mummius Verinus, part of the fifth cohort of the vigiles, at the beginning of the third century.
- Rasinia Leda, the wife of Lucius Faenius Successus, buried at Rome in the second century AD.
- Rasinia Lucifera, the wife of Marcus Acutius Valentinus, with whom she dedicated a monument at Rome to their son, Marcus Acutius Valentinus, aged eleven years, one month, and eighteen days, and a slave, Eutychianus, aged six years, five months, and fifteen days, dating between AD 71 and 130.
- Marcus Rasinius Martialis, the father of Sextus Rasinius, a child buried at Thysdrus.
- Decimus Rasinius D. f. Memor, son of Decimus Rasinius Celado and Rasinia, buried in the family sepulchre built by his mother at Rome, aged eleven months.
- Rasinia Mustice, built a monument at Rome for her slave, Appta, aged seventeen years, thirty days.
- Rasinia Pietas, nursemaid to the daughters of Lucius Burbuleius Optatus Ligarianus, consul in AD 135.
- Lucius Rasinius Pisanus, a potter at Arretium during the Augustan period, whose name appears on pottery found all over the Roman world, along with the names of the various slaves who worked under him.
- Lucius Rasinius Pisaurensis, known from a number of inscriptions from Hispania Tarraconensis.
- Marcus Rasinius Postumus, a soldier at Lambaesis, perhaps the same Rasinius Postumus who buried his wife, Maria Caecina, at Lambaesis.
- Rasinia Prim[a?], named in a funerary inscription from Rome.
- Lucius Rasinius Primigenius, named in an inscription from Pisae.
- Lucius Rasinius Saturninus, named in an inscription from Rome,
- Lucius Rasinius L. f. Saturninus Maximianus, aedile and duumvir at Sufetula in Africa Proconsularis.
- Quintus Rasinius L. f. Saturninus, built a tomb for his father, Lucius Rasinius Celer, at Masclianae. Probably the same Quintus Rasinius Saturninus who was a member of the fullers' guild, named in an inscription from Mactaris.
- Rasinia Secunda, named in an inscription from Tipasa in Mauretania Caesariensis, commemorating her return on the sixteenth day before the Kalends of November, in AD 238.
- Rasinia Secundina, built a monument to Saturninus, one of the duumvirs at Cupra Montana in Picenum, perhaps her father.
- Lucius Rasinius Severus, named in an inscription from Mutina in Etruria.
- Gaius Rasinius Silo, procurator of Noricum in an uncertain year, known from a libationary inscription dedicated to Jupiter Optimus Maximus.
- Gaius Rasinius C. f. Tettianus, prefect of the engineers stationed at Asisium in Umbria, in the early or middle first century AD.
- Gaius Rasinius Valens, named in an inscription from Philippi in Macedonia, dedicated to Neptune and the Dioscuri.

== See also ==
- List of Roman gentes

== Bibliography ==
- Dionysius of Halicarnassus, Romaike Archaiologia (Roman Antiquities).
- Theodor Mommsen et alii, Corpus Inscriptionum Latinarum (The Body of Latin Inscriptions, abbreviated CIL), Berlin-Brandenburgische Akademie der Wissenschaften (1853–present).
- Notizie degli Scavi di Antichità (News of Excavations from Antiquity, abbreviated NSA), Accademia dei Lincei (1876–present).
- René Cagnat et alii, L'Année épigraphique (The Year in Epigraphy, abbreviated AE), Presses Universitaires de France (1888–present).
- Paul von Rohden, Elimar Klebs, & Hermann Dessau, Prosopographia Imperii Romani (The Prosopography of the Roman Empire, abbreviated PIR), Berlin (1898).
- George H. Chase, The Loeb Collection of Arretine Pottery, James Loeb, New York (1908), Catalogue of Arretine Pottery, Houghton Mifflin, Cambridge (1916).
- La Carte Archéologique de la Gaule (Archaeological Map of Gaul, abbreviated CAG), Académie des Inscriptions et Belles-Lettres (1931–present).
- Giovanni Maria De Rossi, Bovillae, Olschki, Florence (1979).
- Attilio Mastino, L’Africa Romana (abbreviated AfrRom), University of Sassari (1983–present).
- Gian Luca Gregori, La collezione epigrafica dell'Antiquarium Comunale del Celio (The Epigraphic Collection of the Ancient Community of the Caelian Hill), Rome (2001).
- Shelley C. Stone, The Hellenistic and Roman Fine Pottery, Morgantina Studies, vol. VI, Princeton University Press (2015).
