= Gaius Julius Severus =

2nd century Roman senator, consul and proconsul of Asia

Gaius Julius Severus was a Roman senator and aristocrat of the second century. He was suffect consul around the year 138.

Severus was a member of the ancient aristocracy of Asia Minor that persisted into Roman times. He claimed to have descended from Celtic and Macedonian Greek royalty, especially Attalus II, ruler of Galatia. More certainly, he was the son of Gaius Julius Quadratus. He is known to have a brother, Julius Amyntianus, and he is attested to have married Claudia Aquilla.

== Career ==
Severus is notable for having held offices both in the cursus of his native Ancyra, the capital of Roman Galatia, as well as in the Roman cursus honorum. At a young age Severus held the offices of agoranoma, or overseer of the marketplace, agonothet; or overseer of the local games; and archon of Ancyra. He was also a flamen of the Imperial Cult at Ancyra, where he demonstrated his generosity by providing from his own purse oil to the inhabitants of the city, using the money allocated for this purpose to the maintenance of public buildings. Likewise his wife, also a priestess, showed munificence. He also demonstrated his generosity towards the emperor, providing provisions for the soldiers in the Winter of 113/114 as they marched to Trajan's Parthian campaign, and again in the Fall of 117 as they returned from the campaign. In return, the emperor Hadrian, Trajan's successor, adlected Severus into the Senate as an ex-plebeian tribune; few persons are known to have been adlected by Hadrian, so this was an even more prestigious honor.

His career as a Roman senator is recorded in an inscription from his home of Ancyra. He was praetor, the next magistracy after plebeian tribune, probably around the year 126. Not long after this, Hadrian appointed Severus legate, or assistant, to the proconsular governor of Asia; usually the proconsul selected his own assistant, so this is another unusual step Severus benefited from. Mireille Corbier suspects Hadrian had wanted him to handle some thorny problems of administering some of the cities of the province. An inscription from Dorylaeum attests to his adjudication of the boundary between that city and one of its neighbors; Corbier believes that second city was Midaeum. Severus was then appointed legatus legionis or commander of Legio IV Scythica from approximately the year 130 to 132, then stationed in Syria; Corbier notes his homonymous son served as military tribune of that legion under him. The most noteworthy event of his command was that the governor of Syria, Gaius Poblius Marcellus, was called away to attend to the Bar Kochba revolt, which required Severus to fill in as governor of this strategic province.

His interim term as governor must have been successful, for Severus was constantly in the imperial service for the rest of the 130s; this close sequence of offices make dating the exact year he held any office controversial. He won the sortition to govern Achaea for 133/134. Next, Hadrian picked him to govern Bithynia and Pontus, which has been dated from 134 to 135 or 136. Corbier suspects his duties included the same charge that Pliny the Younger and Gaius Julius Cornutus Tertullus were given before him: to sort out the finances of its cities. This he handled with a success that brought him fame with its inhabitants that was still remembered in Dio Cassius' time. After returning to Rome from that province, Severus was appointed prefect of the aerarium Saturni; the time he held this office must be squeezed in between his governorship and his suffect consulship, possibly as early as the year 135 to the year 138. Either in 138 or 139 Severus was honored with a consulship.

His residency in Rome was extended with more appointments by Hadrian. First he was curator operum locarumque publicorum et aedium sacrarum ("overseer of public buildings, places, and sacred works") around 140. About this time he was admitted to the College of Pontiffs, the most prestigious of the ancient Roman priesthoods. This was followed by an appointment as governor of Germania Inferior from the year 142 to 145. Corbier notes his son accompanied him again, this time as commander of Legio XXX Ulpia Victrix.

Severus returned to Rome in time to participate in the sortition for one of the two consular public provinces, and he received Asia as his to govern in the years 152/153. Corbier imagines him at this point as having felt like an exile, having spent so many years away from his ancestral Asia Minor. Seeing this province, where he began his imperial career some 25 years earlier, must have been a welcoming event. Here he came into conflict with the Greek orator Aelius Aristides, who had protested he could not discharge his civic duties due to his illness; despite his pleas, Severus ruled Aelius was liable for them.

At this point Severus leaves the pages of history. Since he was, at the youngest, in his sixties, Severus probably died not long after leaving the province of Asia.
