= Legio III Italica =

Roman legion founded in 165 AD

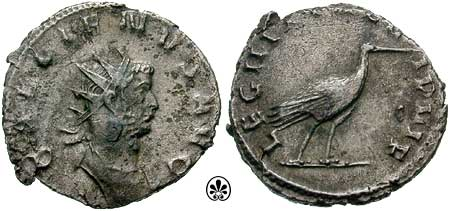
An antoninianus issued by Gallienus in 260 to celebrate III Italica. Note the stork, the legion's symbol, on the obverse. The legion is called VI Pia VI Fidelis, "six times faithful and six times loyal"

Legio III Italica ("Italian Third Legion") was a legion of the Imperial Roman army founded in 165 AD by the emperor Marcus Aurelius (r. AD 161–80) for his campaign against the Marcomanni tribe. The cognomen Italica suggests that the legion's original recruits were drawn for the defence of Italy. The legion was still active in Raetia and other provinces in the early 5th century (Notitia Dignitatum, dated ca. 420 AD for Western Roman Empire entries).

Together with Legio II Italica and Legio I Adiutrix, Legio III Italica was in the Danube provinces from the beginning, fighting the Marcomanni invasion of the Raetia and Noricum provinces. In 171 AD, they built the camp Castra Regina, (modern Regensburg) designed as a strong defensive position.

In the civil war of 193 AD, this legion supported Septimius Severus and helped him defeat his opponents: first Didius Julianus, then Pescennius Niger, and Clodius Albinus. Their loyalty was extended to Severus' successor, Emperor Caracalla, for whom they fought in 213 AD in a campaign against the Alamanni.

== History ==
Antonine Dynasty

In AD 165, the Emperor Marcus Aurelius raised two new legions – the Legio II Italica and Legio III Italica, in preparation for a major campaign. Gaius Vettius Sabinianus was the legion's first commander. Immediately after receiving their eagles, both legions were sent to Pannonia, which was being invaded by the Marcomanni. An inscription from Salona in Dalmatia attest to detachments (vexillationes) of the legion fortifying that strategic port city.

Under the command of Quintus Antistius Adventus, the Legio III Italica took part in the expeditio Germanica that protected Italy against Germanic tribes. In AD 170, the legion probably attacked the Germanic tribes under the command of the later Emperor Pertinax and in part succeeded in the process of expelling the Germanic invaders from the provinces of Raetia and Noricum.

During the AD 170s, the legion didn't have an established base but was dispersed in detachments. Between AD 172 and 179, some cohorts of the legion were stationed in the large temporary fort of Eining. Other detachments were stationed at Alkofen and Regensburg Kumpfmuehl. A headquarters for the legion was established around AD 175, as attested by an inscription at the east gate of Castra Regina (modern Regensburg).

From AD 179, the entire legion was stationed in Castra Regina. In AD 182, the legion participated in a military campaign against the Germanic Burer tribe. Soon after their arrival in Raetia, the legion was involved in the construction and, among other things, the repairing of damage to the Limes forts that had occurred in the course of the Marcomanni wars. They also built forts in Ellingen, Pfünz, Künzing, Dambach, Passau and Straubing. For this operation, inter alia, the Legion used brickworks in Bad Abbach.

A section built in the year AD 181, under the supervision of a centurion, the safety fence of the fort Böhming is inscribed:

Transferred soldiers (vexillarii) of Legio III Italica have the wall (vallum), built under the supervision of Julius Iulinus, centurion of Legio III Italica.

The majority of reinforcements for the legion came from the numerous villae rusticae in Raetia and initially served the legion well.

After the catastrophic German invasions from the middle of the 3rd century, many of these farms were destroyed and not rebuilt.

Earlier, reinforcements were partly brought from northern Italy; in Trento an inscription was discovered dating from the late 2nd century from Gaius Valerius Marianus annonae, there as adlectus legionis III Italicae – (literally, selected for the food supply of the Legio III Italica). However, the route over the Brenner Pass was not the only supply line, also from the Great St. Bernard is a dedicatory inscription (200 AD) of Titus Claudius Severus, a frumentarius legionis (Logistics Officer). He donated a bronze votive tablet to Jupiter Poeninus while travelling through the pass, possibly as a courier on the orders of the governor.

Aurelius Silvinus, another frumentarius legionis, left behind in Rome a dedicatory inscription. He was probably an official under Severus Alexander, and consecrated on the Caelian a small marble statue of the god in the "camp of the strangers" (castra peregrina).

Severan Dynasty

In the civil war of 193 (so-called Second Year of the Four Emperors), the legion supported Septimius Severus against Didius Julianus, and later against Clodius Albinus and Pescennius Niger in the struggle for the imperial throne.

As a reward for their loyalty, a series of coins were struck, which had a lapel one flanked by the eagle legion standards and the inscription LEG(io) III ITAL(ica).

Their loyalty continued with Severus' successor and son Caracalla, under whose guidance in 213 they took part in a campaign against the Alemanni, and in 214 against the Karpen in Dacia and Syria in 217.

From this time the legion held the honorary title Antoniniana. Two inscriptions from the Dacian garrison city of Alba Iulia record the presence of two centurions of the III Legion, Marcus Ulpius Caius and Marcus Ulpius Vitalis. As part of the most battle-worthy army of the Danube, the III Italica was often involved in the conflicts of the so-called "soldier-emperors" in the Crisis of the Third Century.

They also served under the last two Severans Elagabalus (218–222) and Severus Alexander (222–235). The latter gave the Legion the honorary title Severiana.

Soldier Emperors

In an inscription from Celeia (Celje, Slovenia), another name of honor was added, Gordiana, suggesting that a detachment of the legion under Gordian III was proven in a campaign against the Sassanid Empire (242–244).

In 253 the legion supported the connection of their commander to the emperor Valerian. A detachment went with him in 259/60, again in the East, where an inscription of Shapur I. Sassanide, who Valerian defeated at Edessa and captured, talks of soldiers " from the people of Raeter " in the Roman army.

Meanwhile, in the West under the leadership of his son and second emperor Gallienus (253-268), the legion won multiple victories against German tribes, for which VI Pia VI Fidelis (six times faithful and loyal) and VII Pia VII Fidelis (seven times faithful and loyal) was awarded.

The Legio III Italica is not mentioned on the historically significant dedicatory inscription of the Augsburger Siegesaltar (made in 260), which has given rise to speculation about their whereabouts at the time.

A complete withdrawal of the Legion of Raetia is unlikely, as it was marching at this time only with the more flexible detachments in the field.

The Legion had been repeatedly deployed to the Persian front to fight against the usurper Ingenuus, and against the Alemanni. A complete withdrawal of the Legion would have been unlikely in view of the tense security situation.

In the year 273, the Legion was fighting in the war of Emperor Aurelian against the secession of the queen of Palmyra, Zenobia, in the east of the empire.

The legion was joined on the Palmyrenean campaign by a detachment of the Norian II Italica, and was involved in a decisive battle at Emesa (now Homs, Syria) in 272:

"... The Palmyrene army of 70 000 men strong [ ... ] and gathered in the plain before Emesa .

Opposite them is [Aurelian] placed with his Dalmatian cavalry, and with the Moesiern, the Pannonians [...], and the Noriker and Rhaetians, the Celtic legions are ..."

According to the Historia Augusta, in 275 Aurelian led an expedition to Raetia to again repulse sunken barbarians.

The Emperor Probus (276–282) was active militarily in Raetia and won a decisive victory at Lech in 278/279 over a coalition of Burgundians and Vandals. Despite this victory, in 282, Legio II and III Italica proclaimed the usurper Carus as a new emperor, by raising him on their shields.

Late Antiquity

In 285, a detachment of the Legion possibly took part in the campaign of Maximian to Africa. Selected existing soldiers of the Legion cohort was as Tertiani by the year 300 as legionis comitatenses in the field army Comes the Illyrici had been incorporated. They were under the command of the Magister Peditum Praesentalis.

Since the end of the 5th century the Rhaetian Legion no longer appears as a cohesive unit. Rather, they had been reorganized under the leadership of a sub-prefect into six major detachments. Approximately 1,000 men were probably still stationed at Castra Regina.

Since the main source for this is the Notitia Dignitatum, apparently it no longer reflects the original unit with the pars inferior (the section between Regensburg and Passau), and can probably be taken more as detachments for the early 4th century. According to the Notitia Dignitatum, the northern border of Raetia was now formed of the pars superior (upper part), with larger departments of the Legion stationed in Submuntorio and Vallato.

The western boundary was the pars media (middle part) with the city Cambodunum and border post Vemania to Cassilacum. The Legio III Italica was now "under the decree of the Most Honourable General of the provinces Raetiae I and II" (Sub dispositione viri spectabilis ducis provinciae Raetiae primae et secundae). It was spread over five locations, where each detachment was again led by its own Praefectus.

The soldiers from Zirl transported food and consumer goods over the Brenner pass to Seefeld by horse and handed them over to the cohort on foot. From there supply boats could transport supplies further down the Lech Valley, to provide, for example, the departments in Submuntorio (Burghöfe or Mertingen) and others units.

The road on foot led northwest via Cambodunum (Kempten), where again the forts could be built at the Iller.

The detachments in forts probably oversaw the section of road to the nearby provincial capital of Augusta Vindelicorum (Augsburg). It is likely that this unit was also equipped with rowing boats and so controlled the Danube marshes west and east of the mouth of the Lech.

With the loss of Dekumatlandes, Cambodunum had become a border town. From Cambodunum to the mouth of the Iller, the Empire's border ran along the route of the river.

There is a probable reference in the Notitia Dignitatum of a detachment of the Legio III Italica comprising about 200 men stationed on the higher grounds of the castle mound in this area. This detachment was likely responsible for the defense of the fort chain of Vimania (Isny) to Cassiliacum (Memmingen?).

== In the Crisis of the Third Century ==
Since the cognomen III Italica Gordiana is recorded, vexillationes (detachments) of the legion were involved in Emperor Gordian III's campaign against the Sassanid Empire in 243–244.

As part of the powerful Danubian army, Legio III Italica took part in the frequent 3rd century internal power struggles. The legion fought for Gallienus against his rival Postumus, so it was awarded with the VI Pia VI Fidelis (six times faithful and six times loyal) and VII Pia VII Fidelis (seven times faithful and seven times loyal) cognomen. Legio III Italica main camp was still Regensburg, but they were included in the 273 AD campaign commanded by Emperor Aurelian against Queen Zenobia.

Shield pattern of the Tertiani Italica, the comitatensis legion derived from Legio III Italica.

== Notitia Dignitatum ==
Detachments (vexillationes) of the legion, comitatensis units, are mentioned in Notitia Dignitatum as still being in Castra Regina and the Danubian provinces during the early 5th century.

== Attested members ==
Name	Rank	Time frame	Province	Source
Gaius Vettius Sabinianus	legatus legionis	c. 168	Pannonia	AE 1920, 45
Marius Maximus	tribunus laticlavius	c. 178-180	Pannonia	
Aurelius Argivus	centurion	182	Raetia	AE 1983, 730

== See also ==
- List of Roman legions
