= Marcus Aemilius Avianus =

Roman nobleman of the 1st century BC

Marcus Aemilius Avianus was a nobleman of the Aemilia gens of ancient Rome who lived in the 1st century BCE. He was a friend of the writer Cicero, and the patron of the sculptor Avianus Evander and the freedman Gaius Avianus Hammonius.
