= Gnaeus Pinarius Cornelius Severus =

Roman politician 2nd century AD

Gnaeus Pinarius Cornelius Severus was a Roman politician and senator in the 2nd century AD.

== Biography ==
Severus came from the gens Pinaria, an ancient patrician family that had held several consulships since the 5th century BC. He was probably the grandson of Gnaeus Pinarius Cornelius Clemens, consul in 71/72 AD. Severus belonged to the Salian priesthood, an order of patrician youths dedicated to Mars. Emperor Trajan advanced his political career, resulting in Severus achieving the quaestorship and praetorship. In 112 AD, he was appointed suffect consul. He also held the offices of augur and rex sacrorum.
