= Potitia gens =

Ancient Roman family

The gens Potitia was an ancient patrician family at ancient Rome. None of its members ever attained any of the higher offices of the Roman state, and the gens is known primarily as a result of its long association with the rites of Hercules, and for a catastrophic plague that was said to have killed all of its members within a single month, at the end of the fourth century BC. However, a few Potitii of later times are known from literary sources and inscriptions.

== Origin ==
The story of the Potitii is inextricably intertwined with that of the Pinarii. According to legend, Hercules came to Italy a generation before the Trojan War, and was received by the families of the Potitii and the Pinarii. He instructed them in a form of worship by which they honoured him for generations. The priesthood of this cult was carried out exclusively by members of these two families, as a sacrum gentilicium—the sacred duty of a particular gens. Michael Grant suggests that the worship overseen by these families was originally introduced to Italy by the Phoenicians, and was devoted to one of the Phoenician gods, who afterwards became assimilated with Hercules.

The position of the Potitii in this cult was superior to that of the Pinarii, who were excluded from partaking of the entrails of the sacrifice, supposedly because they had arrived late to the sacrificial banquet given by Hercules. The two families are said to have carried out their religious obligations for centuries, as hereditary priests of Hercules, until the period of the Samnite Wars, at the end of the fourth century BC.

== Destruction ==
In 312 BC, Appius Claudius Caecus, during his censorship, attempted to persuade the Potitii and the Pinarii to instruct the public slaves in these rites. The Pinarii refused, but the Potitii accepted Claudius' offer of 50,000 pounds of copper. Niebuhr explains that Claudius' intention was to introduce the worship of Hercules, formerly sacra privata, into the religion of the Roman state, thus making them sacra publica. However, because no flamen could be appointed for a foreign god, it was necessary to entrust the rites to slaves.

For their impiety, Hercules sent a plague that carried off the entire gens in the span of thirty days; twelve families and thirty grown men perished, and Claudius himself was struck blind, which is how he obtained his cognomen. (Note: Caecus means "blind".) There is some uncertainty as to the chronology of this legend; Claudius could hardly have been blinded during his censorship, as he went on to be consul in 307, and again in 296 BC, and was then nominated dictator in 292 and 285. Niebuhr suggests that the Potitii may instead have died in a terrible plague that struck Rome in 292.

The disappearance of an entire gens was extraordinary; together with the fact that no magistrates or other important Potitii are mentioned in surviving records, this has led some historians to suspect that they were not in fact a distinct gens, but instead a branch of another patrician family that became extinct around the period of the Samnite Wars, such as the Valerii Potiti, whose surname, Potitus, might have been mistaken for a nomen, Potitius. However, the ancient historians unanimously describe the Potitii as a gens. There are also a few indications that some Potitii survived the destruction of the gens. Cicero mentions a Publius Potitius who lived in the first century BC, and others are known from inscriptions. (Note: The presence of a surname, Potitianus, in several inscriptions implies that others were adopted from the Potitia gens, or descended from it through the female line.)

== In popular culture ==
The Potitii are the focus of the novels Roma and Empire, by Steven Saylor. These novels follow the history of Rome, up to the reign of Hadrian, and concern the fortunes of the Potitii and Pinarii, through the passing down of a family heirloom. As depicted by Saylor, the Potitii who suddenly died were in fact murdered, a clever and ruthless killer poisoning them one by one and never being discovered.

== Members ==
This list includes abbreviated praenomina. For an explanation of this practice, see filiation.

- Potitia, named in an inscription from Rome.
- Potitia, mentioned in an inscription from Tarraco in Hispania.
- Potitia, named in an inscription from Ateste in Venetia and Histria.
- Decimus Potitius, along with Gaius and Lucius Potitius, named in a maker's mark from a work of pottery found at Telo Martius in Gallia Lugdunensis.
- Gaius Potitius, along with Decimus and Lucius Potitius, named in a maker's mark from a work of pottery found at Telo Martius.
- Lucius Potitius, along with Decimus and Gaius Potitius, named in a maker's mark from a work of pottery found at Telo Martius.
- Publius Potitius, (Note: Alternate readings of his name are Titius, Tettius, and Tertius. The C. D. Yonge translation (1903) calls him "Publius Potitius"; the William Peterson Edition (Latin, 1916) gives his name as "Publius Titius", but notes the other possible readings.) one of the guardians of the son of Publius Junius, custodian of the temple of Castor, who died in 80 BC. After five years, the boy's guardians and stepfather became embroiled in a dispute with Verres, who extracted considerable sums of money, supposedly to make extensive repairs to the temple, which in fact was in sound condition.
- Potitia Alpina, the mother of Titus Tincius Alpinus, a municipal official at Lugdunum in Gallia Lugdunensis, to whom she dedicated a monument.
- Marcus Potitius Aurelianus, buried at Tichilla in Africa Proconsularis, aged eighty-five.
- Lucius Potitius Bulicus, husband of Potitia Secundina and father of Potitia Paterna, buried at Nemausus in Gallia Narbonensis.
- Potitia L. f. Paterna, daughter of Lucius Potitius Bulicus and Potitia Secundina.
- Potitius Romulus, an artisan and silversmith buried at Lugdunum, aged twenty years, five months, with a monument dedicated by his wife, Martinia Lea.
- Potitia Secundina, wife of Lucius Potitius Bulicus and mother of Potitia Paterna.
- Roscius Potitius Memmianus, a man of senatorial rank, erected a monument to his mother, Seia Potitia Consortiana, at Thibaris in Africa Proconsularis.
- Seia Potitia Consortiana, the mother of Roscius Potitius Memmianus, buried at Thibaris.

== See also ==
- List of Roman gentes
- Pinaria gens

== Bibliography ==
- Marcus Tullius Cicero, In Verrem.
- Dionysius of Halicarnassus, Romaike Archaiologia (Roman Antiquities).
- Titus Livius (Livy), History of Rome.
- Valerius Maximus, Factorum ac Dictorum Memorabilium (Memorable Facts and Sayings).
- Sextus Pompeius Festus, Epitome de M. Verrio Flacco de Verborum Significatu (Epitome of Marcus Verrius Flaccus' On the Meaning of Words).
- Maurus Servius Honoratus (Servius), Ad Virgilii Aeneidem Commentarii (Commentary on Vergil's Aeneid).
- Ambrosius Theodosius Macrobius, Saturnalia.
- Barthold Georg Niebuhr, The History of Rome, Julius Charles Hare and Connop Thirlwall, trans., John Smith, Cambridge (1828).
- Johann Adam Hartung, Die Religion der Römer (The Religion of the Romans), Palm und Enke, Erlangen (1836).
- Karl Wilhelm Göttling, Geschichte der Römischen Staatsverfassung von Erbauung der Stadt bis zu C. Cäsar's Tod (History of the Roman State from the Founding of the City to the Death of Caesar), Buchhandlung des Waisenhauses, Halle (1840).
- Dictionary of Greek and Roman Biography and Mythology, William Smith, ed., Little, Brown and Company, Boston (1849).
- Theodor Mommsen et alii, Corpus Inscriptionum Latinarum (The Body of Latin Inscriptions, abbreviated CIL), Berlin-Brandenburgische Akademie der Wissenschaften (1853–present).
- René Cagnat et alii, L'Année épigraphique (The Year in Epigraphy, abbreviated AE), Presses Universitaires de France (1888–present).
- Michael Grant, Roman Myths (1971).
