= Titus Flavius Longinus Quintus Marcius Turbo =

2nd century Roman senator, consul and governor

Titus Flavius Longinus Quintus Marcius Turbo was a Roman senator who held a series of offices in the emperor's service. He was suffect consul for one of the nundinia in the years 149 through 151. Longinus is known primarily from inscriptions.

Authorities agree that Longinus was the birth son of Titus Flavius Longinus, a decurion of a city in Dacia, and was later adopted by the prefect of the Praetorian Guard, Quintus Marcius Turbo. Nevertheless, Longinus remained a member of the equestrian order until he was adlected into the Senate.

== Career ==
His cursus honorum can be reconstructed from an inscription. While still an equestrian, Longinus was prefect, or commander, of an unspecified ala; his adlection followed this. He advanced through the traditional Republican magistracies: quaestor, aedile, and praetor. After stepping down from the last magistracy, Longinus was commissioned legatus legionis or commander of Legio I Adiutrix, stationed on the Danube frontier; Géza Alföldy dates his command from around 143 to the year 146. This was followed by a term governing the imperial province of Gallia Lugdunensis, which Alföldy dates from around 146 to around the year 149. His consulship followed.

After completing his term as suffect consul, Longinus is known to have been appointed to two more offices. The first was curator operum locumque publicorum et aedium sacrarum, which Alföldy dates to around 151. The second was governing the imperial province of Moesia Inferior; although primary sources attest him in that position in the year 155, Alföldy extends his tenure in Moesia Inferior from around 153 to 156.

Details for Longinus' life after he stepped down from administering Moesia Inferior have not yet been recovered.
