= Legio II Italica =

Roman legion

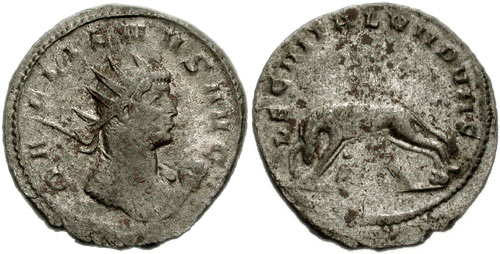
The symbol of II Italica, the she-wolf with twins, on this antoninianus mint by Gallienus. The reverse has LEG II ITAL VII P VII F, "Legio II Italica seven times faithful and loyal".

Legio II Italica ("Italian Second Legion") was a legion of the Imperial Roman army.

== Formation ==
Originally having the cognomen Pia, the legion was raised alongside III Italica by emperor Marcus Aurelius when legions sent from the Danube frontier to the East to take part in the Parthian War could not be quickly recalled. There is good evidence to show both legions were raised in AD 165.

== Unit history ==
The legion's main theatre of operations was the Roman province of Noricum, in the southern margin of the Danube, where Germanic incursions were frequent.

In 180 II Italica was stationed in Lauriacum, modern Lorch.

=== Year of the five emperors ===
In 193, II Italica marched into Rome with Septimius Severus, then fighting for power. The new emperor awarded them the title of Fidelis (loyal) to acknowledge their support. Later Septimius Severus would use II Italica against the rebellions of Pescennius Niger and Clodius Albinus, as well as in his Parthian campaigns.

=== Under Gallienus ===
In the 3rd century, support of the legions was of crucial importance to candidates for the throne. Well aware of this fact, Gallienus granted II Italica the cognomina VII Pia VII Fidelis (seven times faithful, seven times loyal) to secure their continuing support.

=== Later service ===
There are still records of the II Italica in Noricum in the beginning of the 5th century.

== Symbol ==
The legion symbol is a she-wolf and the twins Romulus and Remus, a reference to the rule of Marcus Aurelius and his colleague Lucius Verus.

== See also ==
- List of Roman legions
- Roman legion
- Saint Florian
