= Gnaeus Papirius Aelianus =

2nd century Roman senator, consul and governor

Gnaeus Papirius Aelianus Aemilius Tuscillus was a Roman senator, who was active during the reign of Antoninus Pius. He was suffect consul in the nundinium of September-December 135 as the colleague of Publius Rutilius Fabianus, as attested by two different military diplomas. Aelianus is best known for being governor of Roman Britain in 146.

Anthony Birley notes two fragmentary inscriptions recorded at Iliberris bear his name, which leads Birley to conclude Aelianus was a native of the town. From these inscriptions we know two of the earliest steps of his cursus honorum. The earliest mentioned in the surviving fragments is quaestor of Achaea; upon completion of this traditional Republican magistracy he would be enrolled in the Senate. After this Aelianus was commissioned military tribune for an unknown legion. Birley identifies Aelianus as the governor of Dacia Superior named on a building inscription dated to 132 at Sarmizegetusa.

Little is known of his tenure in Britain, although Aelianus was probably in charge of the occupation of the Scottish Lowlands following its reconquest by Quintus Lollius Urbicus. This may have been peaceful as he was able to spare troops to take part in the Moorish campaign of 145–47. Nor is anything known of Aelianus after he left Britain. Birley notes "it may be presumed that the homonymous cos. ord. of 184 was his grandson."

Political offices
| Preceded by Marcus Aemilius Papus, and Lucius Burbuleius Optatus Ligarianus as suffect consul | Suffect consul of the Roman Empire; 135 with Publius Rutilius Fabianus | Succeeded by Lucius Ceionius Commodus, and Sextus Vettulenus Civica Pompeianus as ordinary consul |
| Preceded by Quintus Lollius Urbicus | Roman governors of Britain; 146 | Succeeded by Unknown, then Titus Caesernius Statianus |
