= Curator aedium sacrarum et operum locorumque publicorum =

Ancient Roman political position

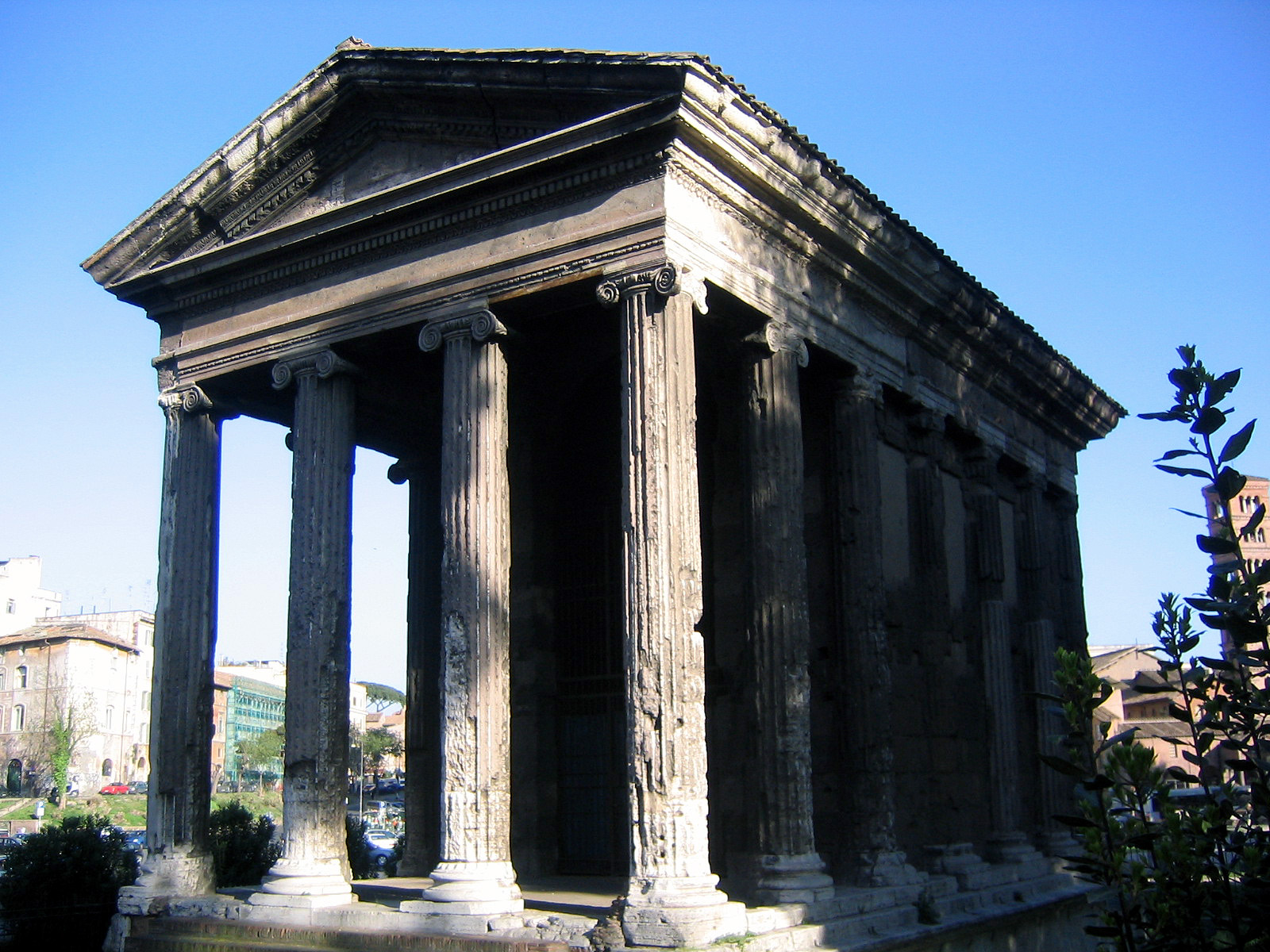
The Temple of Portunus, Rome. The curatores aedium would have been responsible for managing such buildings.

The curator aedium sacrarum et operum locorumque publicorum (pl. curatores) was a political position in ancient Rome. The name translates to 'curator of sacred buildings and public works'. In surviving Roman inscriptions, the words aedium sacrarum are usually preceded by the word curator, but sometimes by resitutor or subcurator. The name utilized for this office was not officially standardized in ancient Rome. Inscriptions use any combination of the words curator, aedium sacrarum, et operum, locorumque publicorum, and populi Romani to refer to the office.

This position may have been reserved for a pair of senators typically of praetorian but sometimes of consular rank. It is also possible the position was a local, municipal title; rather than an imperial position reserved for prominent politicians. One inscription records an individual named Julius Galerius Asper, who was allowed to hold this position before he had become a quaestor. Possibly due to his prestigious father, although it could also mean that the position was not exclusively for high-ranking senators. This claim is evidenced by the omission of this title in other attestations to Asper. It has been argued that if the title was important to Roman politics, it would have been mentioned.

Equestrians typically held the office of subcurator aedium sacrarum. Although, one equestrian named Furius Octavianus is recorded during the third century as a curator. One inscription from Bremenium mentions a subcurator operum publicorum who is the husband of a woman named Julia Lucilla. This may be Rufinus, who is mentioned as the husband of a Julia Lucilla in another inscription from Bremenium. Equestrian subcurators were attached to the senatorial position of curator aedium sacrarum.

It was established between 11 BCE and 14 CE by Augustus or Tiberius to manage the upkeep and construction of public works, sacred places, and temples. These tasks were previously accomplished by the aediles. There were two curatores aedium sacrarum, and they only held their office for one year. Sometimes one of the curators was tasked with managing the public works, while another one of the curators was tasked with managing the sacred buildings. They used a workforce consisting of freedmen. The position may not have continued existing after the Julio-Claudian dynasty. It is also possible that it continued to exist, even into the Later Roman Empire, becoming known as the curator operum publicorum vir clarissimus by the time of Diocletian. They may have assumed responsibility for the management of imperial edifices during this time.

== List of known curatores aedium ==
Name	Date	Reference
Quintus Varius Geminus	Early parts of the reign of Tiberius	
Publius Sulpicius Scribonius Proculus	Reign of Nero	
Marcus Hirrius Fronto Neratius Pansa	Reign of Nero	
Gnaeus Pinarius Cornelius Clemens	Reign of Vespasian	
Tiberius Julius Celsus Polemaeanus	Reign of Domitian	
Salvius Julianus	Reign of Trajan	
Gaius Bruttius Praesens Lucius Fulvius Rusticus	Around 121 CE	
Publius Metilius Secundus	Reign of Hadrian	
Gaius Vettius Sabinianus Julius Hospes	Reign of Marcus Aurelius	
Lucius Burbuleius Optatus Ligarianus	136 CE	
Marcus Aemilius Papus	138 CE	
Gaius Julius Severus	Around 140 CE	
Claudius Maximus	Around 144 CE	
Titus Statilius Maximus	146 CE	
Titus Flavius Longinus Quintus Marcius Turbo	Around 151 CE	
Caecillius ...illianus Maximus	159 CE	
Marcus Servilius Fabianus Maximus	160 CE	
Marcus Iallius Bassus	161 CE	
Cingius Severus	183 CE	
Seius Superstes	193 CE	
Fabius Magnus	193 CE	
Gaius Julius Galerius Asper	197 CE	
Lucius Plotius Sabinus	Reign of Caracalla	
Publius Catius Sabinus	210 CE	
Clodius Pompeianus	244 CE	
Cethegius Pelagius	280–340 CE	
Furius Octavianus	Reign of Maxentius	
