= Mamercus (praenomen) =

Ancient Roman praenomen

Mamercus (Latin pronunciation: [maˈmɛrkʊs]), feminine Mamerca, is a Latin praenomen, or personal name, which was used in pre-Roman times and throughout the Roman Republic, falling out of usage in imperial times. The patronymic gens Mamercia was derived from this name, as were the cognomina Mamercus and Mamercinus. The name was usually abbreviated Mam.

The praenomen Mamercus is best known from gens Aemilia, one of the greatest of the patrician houses at Rome. The gens claimed descent from Mamercus, who was said to have been a son of Numa Pompilius, the second king of Rome. Several prominent members of this family bore the name during the Roman Republic. The Pinarii, another patrician family, was also believed to have used the praenomen Mamercus, although no examples from this gens have been preserved. According to one tradition, the Pinarii were descended from another son of Numa Pompilius. However, in his history of Rome, Titus Livius records that the gens was still more ancient, and predated the founding of the city.

Both the Aemilii and the Pinarii used Mamercus and Mamercinus as cognomina. Other families which used these names as cognomina may have used the praenomen Mamercus at one time.

== Origin and meaning of name ==
According to Festus, the praenomen Mamercus was derived from the name of the god Mamers, who was worshipped throughout Italy in pre-Roman times, and was particularly associated with the Oscans. Since classical times, scholars have postulated that Mamers was the Oscan form of Mars, although the names Marcus and Mamercus frequently existed side-by-side. Whatever the case, Mamercus is generally believed to have been an Oscan praenomen that was brought to Rome during the reign of Numa Pompilius, if not earlier.

Although Mamercus was never widely used at Rome, it came to be regarded as a Latin praenomen. It was always included in lists of personal names, and even received its own regular abbreviation.

The Etruscan form of the name, borrowed from either Latin or Oscan, is Mamarce.
