= Lucius Burbuleius Optatus Ligarianus =

Lucius Burbuleius Optatus Ligarianus was a Roman senator of the second century, who held several offices in the emperor's service. He was suffect consul in the nundinium of May-August 135 as the colleague of Marcus Aemilius Papus. He died while governor of Syria.

An inscription in Minturnae, erected after his death and honoring him as patron of the city, records his cursus honorum. Anthony Birley notes that this inscription and his patronage of the colony both point to Ligarianus having a residence there, but as his tribe was Quirina, and the city was enrolled in the Terentina tribe, it was not his place of origin. "Although the very rare gentilicium is not found outside of Italy", concludes Birley, "he may have been a provincial."

== Life ==
His first recorded office was as a tresviri capitales, one of the magistracies that comprised the vigintiviri. This was the least desirable office to hold, for men who held it rarely had a successful career: Anthony Birley could find only five tresviri capitales who went on to be governors of consular imperial provinces. This was followed by a stint as military tribune with Legio IX Hispana in the reign of Hadrian, about the time it was transferred from Roman Britain to a new base along the Rhine frontier. Next he served his quaestorship in Bithynia and Pontus; his time in that province must have come after the governorship of Pliny the Younger, whose letters of the period never mention Ligarianus. Ligarianus then held in order the next two republican magistracies, aedile and praetor, which, like the majority of his recorded career, were held during the reign of Hadrian.

That he had to work to achieve his consulship is reflected in the number of offices he had to hold between being praetor and his consulship. First he was curator of the Viarum Clodia, Cassia and Cimina; oversight of the three Italian roads was usually combined. Next he was curator of the public funds of cities in Gallia Narbonensis, and of the cities Ancona and Tarracina in Italy. According to Mireille Corbier, this was part of an effort by the emperor Hadrian to regularize the finances of cities in the Roman Empire; the senator Publius Pactumeius Clemens carried out similar duties at the same time. Next Ligarianus was commissioned legatus legionis or commander of Legio XVI Flavia Firma, stationed in Syria. Upon returning to Rome, he was appointed proconsular governor of Sicily (130/131); this was followed by another administrative position, prefect of the aerarium Saturni with Marcus Aemilius Papus (132-135).

Papus and Ligarianus became acquaintances, for their paths crossed more than once again, most notably as consuls in the same nundinium. Ligarianus' first consular office was curator operarum locorumque publicorum, or overseer of the public works and places of Rome, around 136; his immediate successor was Papus, who is attested in that position 15 May and 13 December 138.

Ligarianus succeeded the historian Arrian as governor of Cappadocia, an office he held at the time of Hadrian's death (10 July 138); which years his tenure began and ended are uncertain. Géza Alföldy dates his tenure from c. 138 to c. 141, while Werner Eck offers the years 137 and 140. Birley writes Ligarianus "might never have held a consular command but for the fact that Hadrian, in the closing years of his reign, had come to distrust many of his former friends." Despite lack of military experience, Ligarianus must have been a success in this role for when he completed his tenure in Cappadocia, Antoninus Pius appointed him governor of Syria; this new responsibility must have followed without a break after he had left Cappadocia, for Alföldy offers the dates of c. 141 and c. 144 as when Ligarianus began and ended his tenure in Syria.

Political offices
| Preceded by Lucius Tutilius Lupercus Pontianus, and Publius Calpurnius Atilianus as ordinary consuls | Suffect consul of the Roman Empire; 135 with Marcus Aemilius Papus | Succeeded by Publius Rutilius Fabianus, and Gnaeus Papirius Aelianus as suffect consuls |
