= Gnaeus Pinarius Cornelius Clemens =

Gnaeus Pinarius Cornelius Clemens (fl. 1st century AD) was a Roman military officer and senator who was appointed Suffect consul during the reign of Vespasian. He is primarily known through inscriptions.

== Biography ==
Possibly originating from Hispania, son of a Lucius, Clemens Pinarius' polyonymous name poses a challenge: C. Castillo has argued that he was born a Cornelius L.f. who was adopted by a Gnaeus Pinarius; Olli Salomies, however, reports that "among the numerous Pinarii I can find only one Gnaeus, whereas, on the other hand, this praenomen was much in use among the Cornelii." This led Salomies to speculate that he was originally a Gnaeus Cornelius L.f. who added the element "Pinarius" from his mother's side; but noting the existence of Gnaeus Pinarius Aemilius Cicatricula, suffect consul in 72, Salomies concluded that "it is much better to assume" the existence of a Gnaeus Pinarius, despite lack of evidence otherwise of the senator, who adopted both men. In a later article, Salomies noted the existence of Gnaeus Pinarius Caecilius Simplex, suffect consul in 69; this forced him to conclude "the most economical explanation for the existence of the three contemporary Cn. Pinarii would be to postulate an otherwise unknown Cn. Pinarius, probably a man of means but perhaps without an offspring, who could have adopted by testament three promising younger senators."

Prior to AD 74, most probably either AD 71 or 72, Clemens Pinarius was appointed consul suffectus. Following this he was appointed curator aedium sacrarum (or the official responsible for maintaining the religious and public buildings of Rome). His next posting was as Legatus Augusti pro praetore (or imperial governor) of the province of Germania Superior, a position he held from AD 72 to 75. Taking vexillations of the Legio VIII Augusta and the Legio XI Claudia, he undertook a campaign on the right bank of the Rhine in Germania Magna, for which the emperor Vespasian awarded him the ornamenta triumphalia (or insignia of a triumph). Travelling through the sparsely populated Agri Decumates in AD 74, Clemens Pinarius constructed a road from Argentoratum through to the upper Danube. This road shortened the distance between Augusta Vindelicorum and Mogontiacum by 160 km or seven days' march.

Clemens Pinarius was buried in the town of Hispellum. Gnaeus Pinarius Cornelius Severus, the suffect consul of AD 112, is probably his grandson.

== Sources ==
- CIL XIII, 9082
- CIL XI, 5271
- CIL XII, 113
- Peter-Andrew Black: Pinarius Cornelius Clemens, Gnaeus in German, French and Italian in the online Historical Dictionary of Switzerland.

Political offices
Preceded by Uncertain	Consul suffectus of the Roman Empire around AD 71/72	Succeeded by Uncertain
