= Ligaria gens =

The gens Ligaria was a minor family at ancient Rome, best remembered for three brothers who conspired against Caesar, and were afterward proscribed and put to death by the triumvirs. According to Cicero, they were of Sabine origin.

== Members ==
- Publius Ligarius, served against Caesar during the Civil War, but was pardoned after his capture in Hispania in 49 BC, on the condition that he not serve against Caesar again. Disregarding his promise, he returned to arms and was captured by Caesar's forces during the African War in 46; this time he was put to death. His relation to the other Ligarii who opposed Caesar is uncertain. He may have been a fourth brother, but no ancient author so describes him.
- Quintus Ligarius, another opponent of Caesar during the Civil War, was taken prisoner at Adrumentum following the Battle of Thapsus, but spared and allowed to go into exile; Cicero pleased his case before Caesar, and won Ligarius a pardon; but rather than showing gratitude for this act of mercy, Ligarius joined the conspirators who murdered Caesar the following year. He appears to have perished in the proscriptions of the triumvirs, in 43 BC.
- Titus Ligarius, brother of Quintus, was appointed quaestor by Caesar, but was proscribed and put to death by the triumvirs after Caesar's murder.
- Ligarius, also a brother of Quintus, who perished during the proscriptions of the triumvirs.

== See also ==
- List of Roman gentes

== Bibliography ==
- Marcus Tullius Cicero, Pro Ligario, Epistulae ad Familiares, Epistulae ad Atticum.
- Gaius Julius Caesar, (attributed), De Bello Africo (On the African War).
- Plutarchus, Lives of the Noble Greeks and Romans.
- Appianus Alexandrinus (Appian), Bellum Civile (The Civil War).
- Dictionary of Greek and Roman Biography and Mythology, William Smith, ed., Little, Brown and Company, Boston (1849).
