= Aemilia (chief Vestal) =

Ancient Roman priestess

Aemilia was a Vestal virgin who supposedly miraculously restored the sacred fire of the goddess after it had gone out. According to the author the 1st-century CE author Valerius Maximus, one of her students messed up in some manner, allowing the fire to fade. However, Valerius claims that this brief crisis was put to an end when Aemilia, the chief Vestal virgin (Vestalis Maxima), uttered a prayer and placed a piece of her fine clothing upon the hearth, reigniting it. The 1st-century BCE historian Dionysius of Halicarnassus recounts the same story, stating that Aemilia had negligently entrusted the care of the flame to some trainee Vestal, and that the flame had gone out on account of this mistake. Dionysius adds that that there was great commotion in the city of Rome and even an inquiry begun by the Pontiffs into whether there had been some defilement of one of the priestesses, thus accounting for the extinction of the flame. During this affair, Aemilia uttered a prayer, then tore off part of her linen garment, and tossed it into the ashes, and then afterwards a great flame blazed.
