= Gnaeus Pinarius Aemilius Cicatricula =

1st century Roman Senator and suffect consul

Gnaeus Pinarius Aemilius Cicatricula was a Roman senator, who was active during the reign of Domitian. He was suffect consul in the nundinium of November-December 72 as the colleague of Sextus Marcius Priscus. He is known entirely from inscriptions.

== Biography ==
Cicatricula's polyonymous name poses a challenge. Olli Salomies at first reported that "among the numerous Pinarii I can find only one Gnaeus, whereas, on the other hand, this praenomen was much in use among the Cornelii", which lead him to suggest that he was originally a Gnaeus Cornelius L.f. who added the element "Pinarius" from his mother's side. However, he noted the existence of Gnaeus Pinarius Cornelius Clemens, suffect consul in either 71 or 72, and Gnaeus Pinarius Caecilius Simplex, suffect consul in 69, which forced him to conclude "the most economical explanation for the existence of the three contemporary Cn. Pinarii would be to postulate an otherwise unknown Cn. Pinarius, probably a man of means but perhaps without an offspring, who could have adopted by testament three promising younger senators."

Another possible relative is Gnaeus Pompeius Longinus (full name Gnaeus Pinarius Aemilius Cicatricula Pompeius Longinus), whom Salomies postulated was Cicatricula's adopted son.

Cicatricula is known to have held one more office. A fragmentary inscription recovered from Thugga in modern-day Tunisia attests that he was present in Roman Africa in 79/80. The inscription can be restored one of two ways: if restored to read Cn(aeo) Pinar[io Aemilio] / Cicatr[icula leg(ato) Aug(usti) pr(o) pr(aetore)] (as several authorities restore this section), Cicatricula was a legatus sent to Africa on the Emperor's orders; if restored to read Cn(aeo) Pinar[io Aemilio] / Cicatr[icula proco(n)s(ule)] (as Salomies appears to restore it), he was proconsular governor of Roman Africa.

Political offices
Preceded by Marcus Ulpius Trajanus, and Titus Flavius Sabinus as suffect consuls	Suffect consul of the Roman Empire; 72 with Sextus Marcius Priscus	Succeeded by Domitian II, and Lucius Valerius Catullus Messalinus as ordinary consuls
