= Aemilius Asper =

Latin grammarian who possibly lived in the 1st century AD or late 2nd century AD

Aemilius Asper was a Latin grammarian who likely lived in the 1st or late 2nd century AD.

== Works ==
Aemilius Asper wrote commentaries on Terence, Sallust and Virgil dealing with content and form, and including parallels with other authors. Numerous fragments of the commentary on Virgil show that as both critic and commentator he possessed good judgment and taste. They are printed in Keil, Probi in Vergilii Bucolica Commentarius (1848); see also Suringar, Historia Critica Scholiastarum Latinum (1834); Grafenhan, Geschichte der klassischen Philologie im Alterthum, iv (1843–1850).

Two short grammatical treatises of little value survive under the name of Asper, but belong to a much later period, that of Priscian in the 6th century. Both are printed in Keil, Grammatici Latini.

Aelius Donatus is thought to have borrowed freely from Asper.
