= Mireille Corbier =

French historian of Classical history

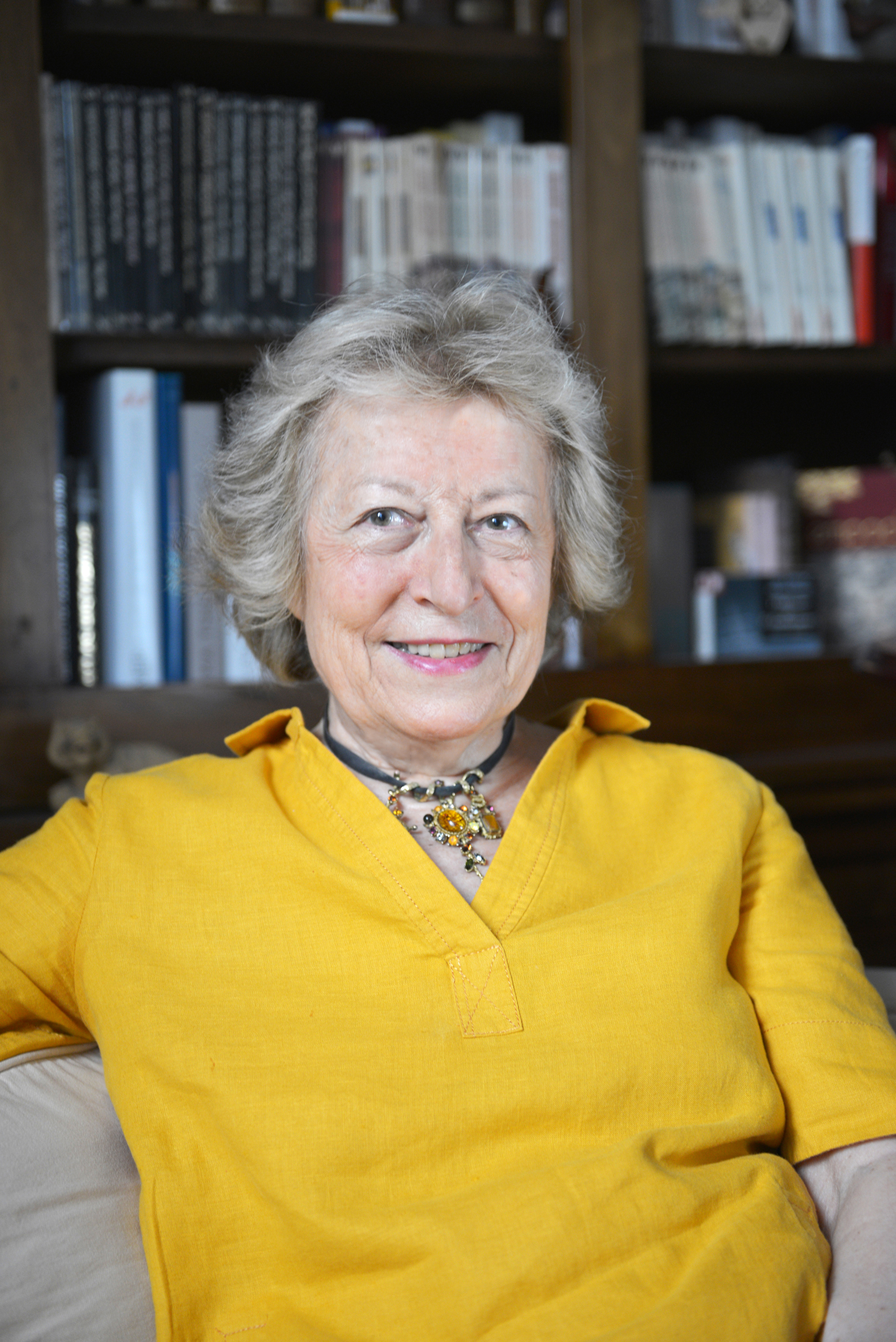
- Born: 24 May 1943 (age 82)
- Occupations: Historian of Classical Antiquity, Epigraphist, Editor-in-Chief of "L'année épigraphique"

Mireille Corbier (born 24 May 1943) is a French historian of Classical history. Currently Research Director Emerita at Centre national de la recherche scientifique (CNRS), she has published a number of books and articles, and since 1992 has been editor-in-chief of L'Année épigraphique.

== Career ==
Corbier began her studies at the Ecole Normale Superieure (1962–1966), during which she became a Fellow of Gonville and Caius College, Cambridge. From 1967 to 1972 she taught ancient history at the University of Paris, X Nanterre. From 1972 to 1975 she was a member of the École française de Rome, where she produced her monograph, L'aerarium saturni et l'aerarium militare. Administration et prosopographie sénatoriale (1974). She then joined CNRS in 1975, meanwhile teaching anthropology at the University of Paris VIII Vincennes.

== Awards ==
Corbier is a Chevalier de l’Ordre National du Mérite, and a member of several professional associations and learned societies. She gave the M. V. Taylor lecture for the Roman Society in January 2020.

== Bibliography ==
- (1974) L'aerarium saturni et l'aerarium militare. Administration et prosopographie sénatoriale. Rome: Ecole française de Rome.
- (1987) "L'écriture dans l'espace public romain." Publications de l'École Française de Rome 98, no. 1: 27–60.
- (1991) "Cité, territoire et fiscalité." Publications de l'École Française de Rome 143, no. 1: 629–665.
- (1999) ed. Adoption et fosterage. Paris: de Boccard.
- (2006) Donner à voir, donner à lire. Mémoire et communication dans la Rome ancienne. Paris: CNRS.
- (2011) ed. with Jean-Pierre Guilhembet. L’écriture dans la maison romaine. Paris: de Boccard.
