= Lucius Verus =

Roman emperor from 161 to 169

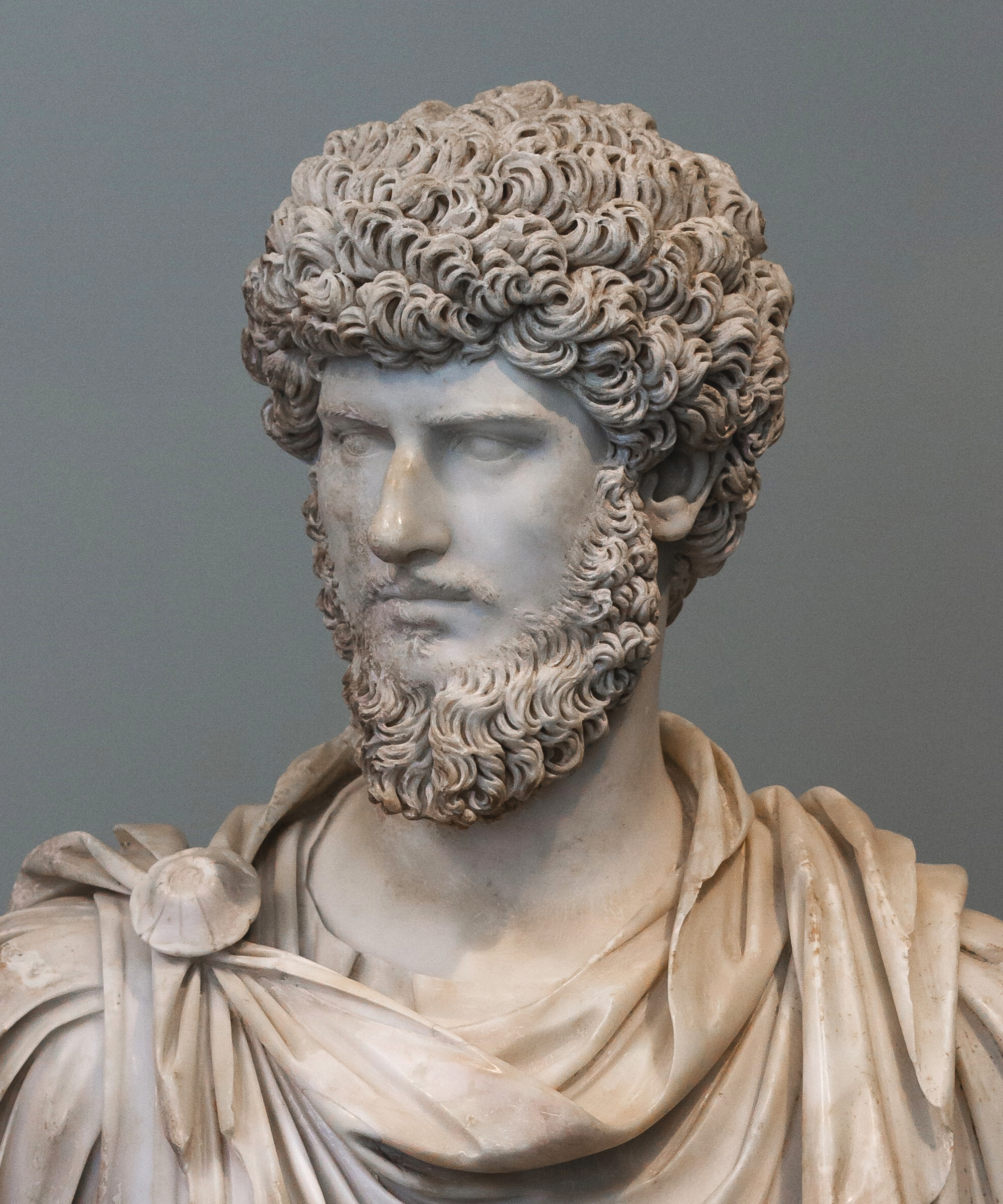
- Bust, Metropolitan Museum of Art

Roman emperor
- Reign: 7 March 161 – January/February 169
- Predecessor: Antoninus Pius
- Successor: Marcus Aurelius
- Co-emperor: Marcus Aurelius
- Born: Lucius Ceionius Commodus; 15 December 130; Rome, Italia, Roman Empire
- Died: January/February 169 (aged 38); Altinum, Italia, Roman Empire
- Burial: Hadrian's Mausoleum
- Spouse: Lucilla (m. 164)
- Issue: Aurelia Lucilla; Lucilla Plautia; Lucius Verus
Names
- Lucius Aelius Aurelius Commodus (after adoption)
Regnal name
- Imperator Caesar Lucius Aurelius Verus Augustus
- Dynasty: Nerva–Antonine
- Father: Lucius Aelius Caesar (natural); Antoninus Pius (adoptive, from February 138)
- Mother: Avidia

Lucius Aurelius Verus (/ˈvɪərəs/; 15 December 130 – January/February 169) was Roman emperor from 161 until his death in 169, alongside his adoptive brother Marcus Aurelius. He was a member of the Nerva–Antonine dynasty. Verus' succession together with Marcus Aurelius marked the first time that the Roman Empire was ruled by more than one emperor simultaneously, an increasingly common occurrence in the later history of the Empire.

Born on 15 December 130, he was the eldest son of Lucius Aelius Caesar, first adopted son and heir to Hadrian. Raised and educated in Rome, he held several political offices prior to taking the throne. After his biological father's death in 138, he was adopted by Antoninus Pius, who was himself adopted by Hadrian. Hadrian died later that year, and Antoninus Pius succeeded to the throne. Antoninus Pius would rule the empire until 161, when he died, and was succeeded by Marcus Aurelius, who later raised his adoptive brother Verus to co-emperor.

As emperor, the majority of his reign was occupied by his direction of the war with Parthia which ended in Roman victory and some territorial gains. After initial involvement in the Marcomannic Wars, he fell ill and died in 169. He was deified by the Roman Senate as the Divine Verus (Divus Verus).

== Early life ==
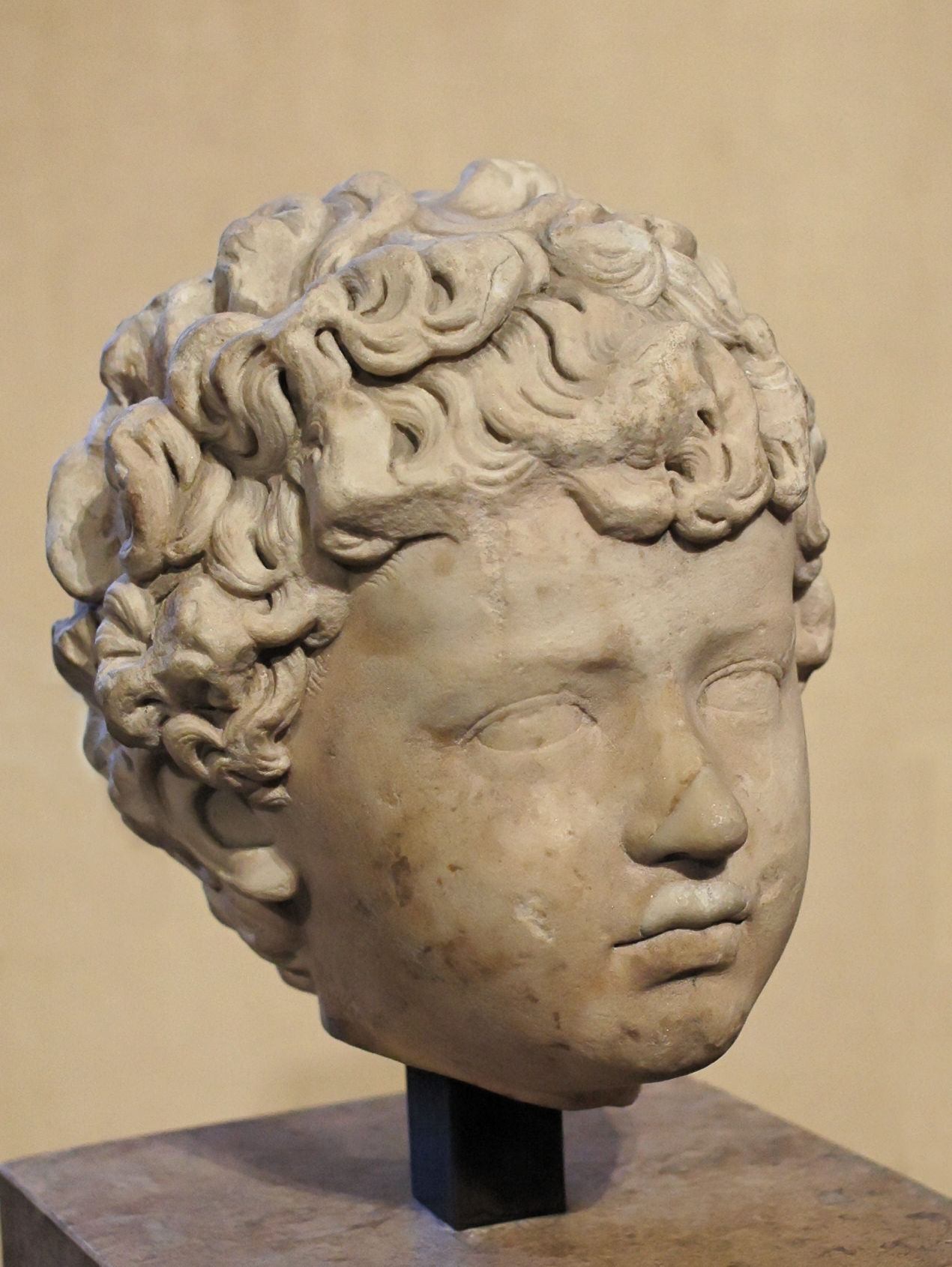
Lucius Verus as a child

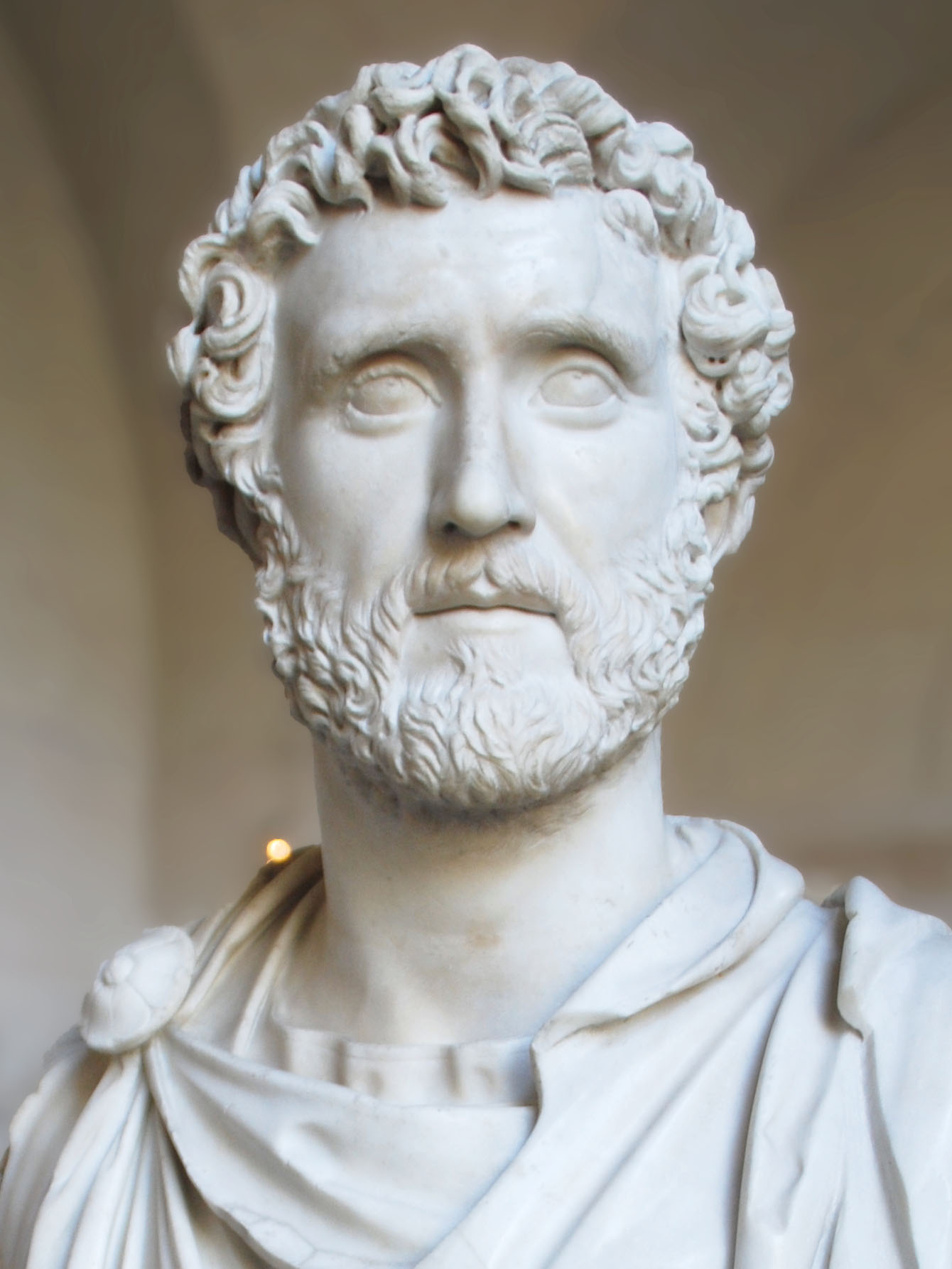
Bust of Antoninus Pius, Glyptothek, Munich

Born Lucius Ceionius Commodus on 15 December 130, Verus was the first-born son of Avidia and Lucius Aelius Caesar, the first adopted son and heir of Emperor Hadrian. He was born and raised in Rome. Verus had two sisters, Ceionia Fabia and Ceionia Plautia. His maternal grandparents were the senator Gaius Avidius Nigrinus and the unattested noblewoman Plautia.

When his father died on 1 January 138, Hadrian chose Titus Aurelius Antoninus as his new heir, giving him the title of caesar. Antoninus was instructed to adopt Lucius alongside Marcus, Antoninus' nephew by marriage. By this scheme, Lucius, who was already Hadrian's adoptive grandson through his natural father, remained as such through his new father. Antoninus also betrothed his daughter Faustina to Lucius, although the arrangement was canceled soon after.

Immediately after Hadrian's death, Antoninus approached Marcus and requested that his marriage arrangements be amended: Marcus' betrothal to Ceionia Fabia would be annulled, and he would be betrothed to Faustina, Antoninus' daughter, instead. Faustina's betrothal to Lucius, who was Ceionia's brother, would also have to be annulled. Marcus consented to Antoninus' proposal.

As a prince and future emperor, Verus received careful education from the famous grammaticus Marcus Cornelius Fronto. He was reported to have been an excellent student, fond of writing poetry and delivering speeches. Verus started his political career as a quaestor in 153 (one year before the legal age), became consul in 154, and in 161 was consul again with Marcus Aurelius.

== Emperor ==
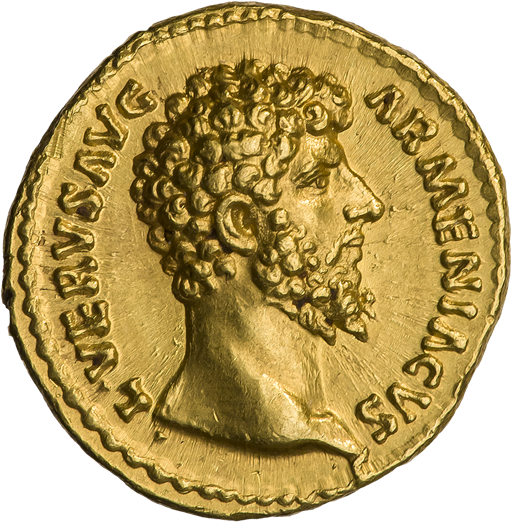
Aureus of Lucius marked: L. VERVS AVG. ARMENIACVS

=== Accession of Lucius and Marcus (161) ===
Antoninus died on 7 March 161, and was succeeded by Marcus Aurelius. Marcus Aurelius bore deep affection for Antoninus, as evidenced by the first book of Meditations. Although the senate planned to confirm Marcus alone, he refused to take office unless Lucius received equal powers.

The senate accepted, granting Lucius the imperium, the tribunician power, and the title augustus. Marcus became, in official titulature, Imperator Caesar Marcus Aurelius Antoninus Augustus; Lucius, forgoing his name Commodus and taking Marcus's original cognomen, Verus, became Imperator Caesar Lucius Aurelius Verus Augustus. (Note: These name-swaps have proven so confusing that even the Historia Augusta, the main source for the period, cannot keep them straight. The fourth-century ecclesiastical historian Eusebius of Caesarea shows even more confusion. The mistaken belief that Lucius had the name "Verus" before becoming emperor has proven especially popular.) It was the first time that Rome was ruled by two emperors. (Note: There was, however, much precedent. The consulate was a twin magistracy, and earlier emperors had often had a subordinate lieutenant with many imperial offices (under Pius, the lieutenant had been Marcus). Many emperors had planned a joint succession in the past—Augustus planned to leave Gaius Caesar and Lucius Caesar as joint emperors on his death; Tiberius wished to have Gaius Caligula and Tiberius Gemellus do so as well; Claudius left the empire to Nero and Britannicus, imagining that they would accept equal rank—but all of these arrangements had ended in failure, either through premature death (Gaius and Lucius Caesar) or judicial murder (Gemellus by Caligula and Britannicus by Nero).)

In spite of their nominal equality, Marcus held more auctoritas, or authority, than Verus. He had been consul once more than Lucius, he had shared in Pius' administration, and he alone was Pontifex maximus. It would have been clear to the public which emperor was the more senior. As the biographer wrote, "Verus obeyed Marcus...as a lieutenant obeys a proconsul or a governor obeys the emperor."

Immediately after their senate confirmation, the emperors proceeded to the Castra Praetoria, the camp of the praetorian guard. Lucius addressed the assembled troops, which then acclaimed the pair as imperatores. Then, like every new emperor since Claudius, Lucius promised the troops a special donative. This donative, however, was twice the size of those past: 20,000 sesterces (5,000 denarii) per capita, and more to officers. In return for this bounty, equivalent to several years' pay, the troops swore an oath to protect the emperors. The ceremony was perhaps not entirely necessary, given that Marcus' accession had been peaceful and unopposed, but it was good insurance against later military troubles.

Pius's funeral ceremonies were, in the words of the biographer, "elaborate". If his funeral followed the pattern of past funerals, his body would have been incinerated on a pyre at the Campus Martius, while his spirit would rise to the gods' home in the heavens. Marcus and Lucius nominated their father for deification. In contrast to their behavior during Pius's campaign to deify Hadrian, the senate did not oppose the emperors' wishes.

A flamen, or cultic priest, was appointed to minister the cult of the deified Pius, now Divus Antoninus. Pius's remains were laid to rest in Hadrian's mausoleum, beside the remains of Marcus's children and of Hadrian himself. The temple he had dedicated to his wife, Diva Faustina, became the Temple of Antoninus and Faustina. It survives as the church of San Lorenzo in Miranda.

=== Early rule (161–162) ===
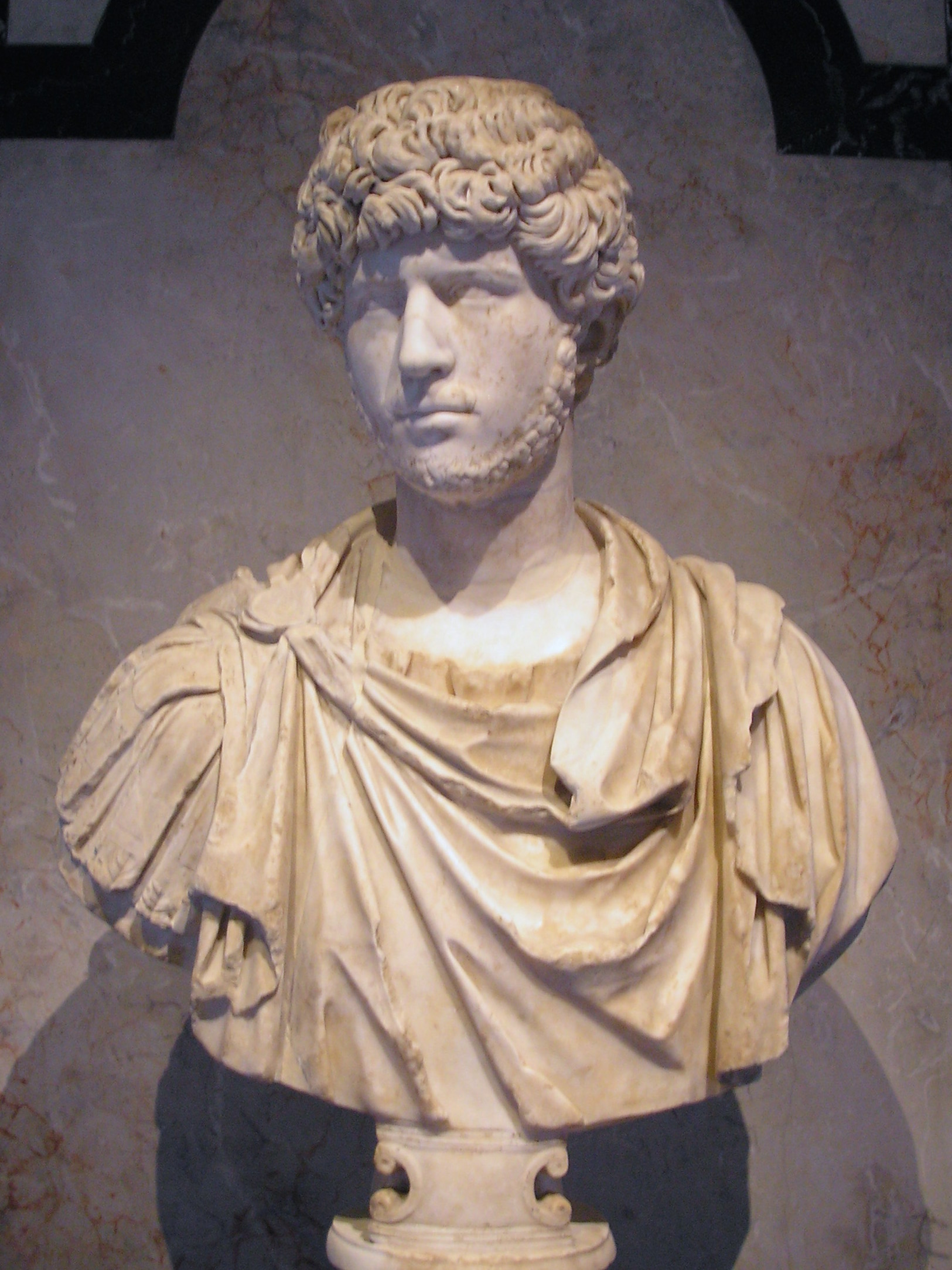
Bust of Lucius as a young man, in the Collection of Greek and Roman Antiquities in the Kunsthistorisches Museum, Vienna

Soon after the emperors' accession, Marcus's eleven-year-old daughter, Annia Lucilla, was betrothed to Lucius (in spite of the fact that he was her uncle). At the ceremonies commemorating the event, new provisions were made for the support of poor children, along the lines of earlier imperial foundations. Marcus and Lucius proved popular with the people of Rome, who strongly approved of their civiliter (lacking pomp) behavior.

The emperors permitted free speech, evidenced by the fact that the comedy writer Marullus was able to criticize them without suffering retribution. At any other time, under any other emperor, he would have been executed. But it was a peaceful time, a forgiving time. And thus, as the biographer wrote, "No one missed the lenient ways of Pius."

Fronto returned to his Roman townhouse at dawn on 28 March, having left his home in Cirta as soon as news of his pupils' accession reached him. He sent a note to the imperial freedman Charilas, asking if he could call on the emperors. Fronto would later explain that he had not dared to write the emperors directly. The tutor was immensely proud of his students. Reflecting on the speech he had written on taking his consulship in 143, when he had praised the young Marcus, Fronto was ebullient: "There was then an outstanding natural ability in you; there is now perfected excellence. There was then a crop of growing corn; there is now a ripe, gathered harvest. What I was hoping for then, I have now. The hope has become a reality." Fronto called on Marcus alone; neither thought to invite Lucius.

Lucius was less esteemed by his tutor than his brother, as his interests were on a lower level. Lucius asked Fronto to adjudicate in a dispute he and his friend Calpurnius were having on the relative merits of two actors. Marcus told Fronto of his reading—Coelius and a little Cicero—and his family. His daughters were in Rome, with their great-great-aunt Matidia Minor; Marcus thought the evening air of the country was too cold for them.

The emperors' early reign proceeded smoothly. Marcus was able to give himself wholly to philosophy and the pursuit of popular affection. Some minor troubles cropped up in the spring; there would be more later. In the spring of 162, (Note: Because both Verus and Marcus are said to have taken active part in the recovery (HA Marcus 8.4–5), the flood must have happened before Verus's departure for the east in 162; because it appears in the biographer's narrative after Pius' funeral has finished and the emperors have settled into their offices, it must not have occurred in the spring of 161. A date in autumn 161 or spring 162 is probable, and, given the normal seasonal distribution of Tiber flooding, the most probable date is in spring 162. (Birley dates the flood to autumn 161).) the Tiber flooded over its banks, destroying much of Rome. It drowned many animals, leaving the city in famine. Marcus and Lucius gave the crisis their personal attention. (Note: Since 15 CE, the river had been administered by a Tiber conservancy board, with a consular senator at its head and a permanent staff. In 161, the curator alevi Tiberis et riparum et cloacarum urbis (curator of the Tiber bed and banks and the city sewers") was A. Platorius Nepos, son or grandson of the builder of Hadrian's Wall, whose name he shares. He probably had not been particularly incompetent. A more likely candidate for that incompetence is Nepos' likely predecessor, M. Statius Priscus. A military man and consul for 159, Priscus probably looked on the office as little more than "paid leave".) In other times of famine, the emperors are said to have provided for the Italian communities out of the Roman granaries.

=== War with Parthia (161–166) ===
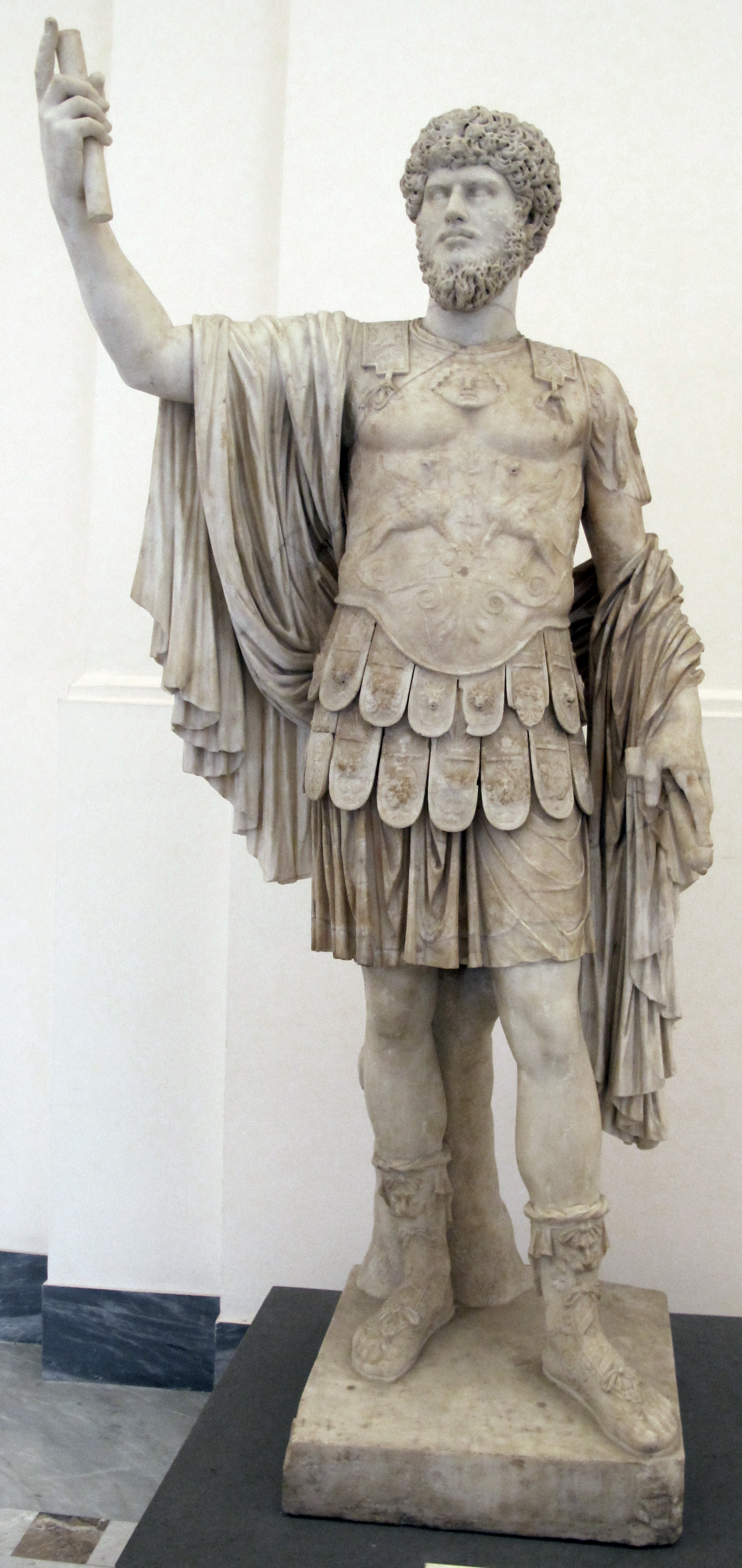
Head of Lucius Verus on an older statue from 50 to 75 AD, in military garb and wearing a muscle cuirass, Farnese Collection, Naples

==== Origins to Lucius's dispatch (161–162) ====
On his deathbed, Pius spoke of nothing but the state and the foreign kings who had wronged him. One of those kings, Vologases IV of Parthia, made his move in late summer or early autumn 161. Vologases entered the Kingdom of Armenia (then a Roman client state), expelled its king and installed his own—Pacorus, an Arsacid like himself.

At the time of the invasion, the Governor of Syria was Lucius Attidius Cornelianus. Attidius had been retained as governor even though his term ended in 161, presumably to avoid giving the Parthians the chance to wrong-foot his replacement. The Governor of Cappadocia, the front-line in all Armenian conflicts, was Marcus Sedatius Severianus, a Gaul with much experience in military matters. But living in the east had a deleterious effect on his character.

Severianus had fallen under the influence of Alexander of Abonoteichus, a self-proclaimed prophet who carried a snake named Glycon around with him, but was really only a confidence man. Alexander was father-in-law to the respected senator Publius Mummius Sisenna Rutilianus, then-proconsul of Asia, and friends with many members of the east Roman elite. Alexander convinced Severianus that he could defeat the Parthians easily, and win glory for himself.

Severianus led a legion (perhaps the IX Hispana) into Armenia, but was trapped by the great Parthian general Chosrhoes at Elegeia, a town just beyond the Cappadocian frontiers, high up past the headwaters of the Euphrates. Severianus made some attempt to fight Chosrhoes, but soon realized the futility of his campaign, and committed suicide. His legion was massacred. The campaign had only lasted three days.

There was threat of war on other frontiers as well—in Britain, and in Raetia and Upper Germany, where the Chatti of the Taunus mountains had recently crossed over the limes. Marcus was unprepared. Pius seems to have given him no military experience; the biographer writes that Marcus spent the whole of Pius's twenty-three-year reign at his emperor's side—and not in the provinces, where most previous emperors had spent their early careers. (Note: Alan Cameron adduces the fifth-century writer Sidonius Apollinaris's comment that Marcus commanded "countless legions" vivente Pio (while Pius was alive) while contesting Birley's contention that Marcus had no military experience. (Neither Apollinaris nor the Historia Augusta (Birley's source) are particularly reliable on second-century history).) Marcus made the necessary appointments: Marcus Statius Priscus, the Governor of Britain, was sent to replace Severianus as Governor of Cappadocia. Sextus Calpurnius Agricola took Priscus's former office.

===== Strategic emergency in the East =====
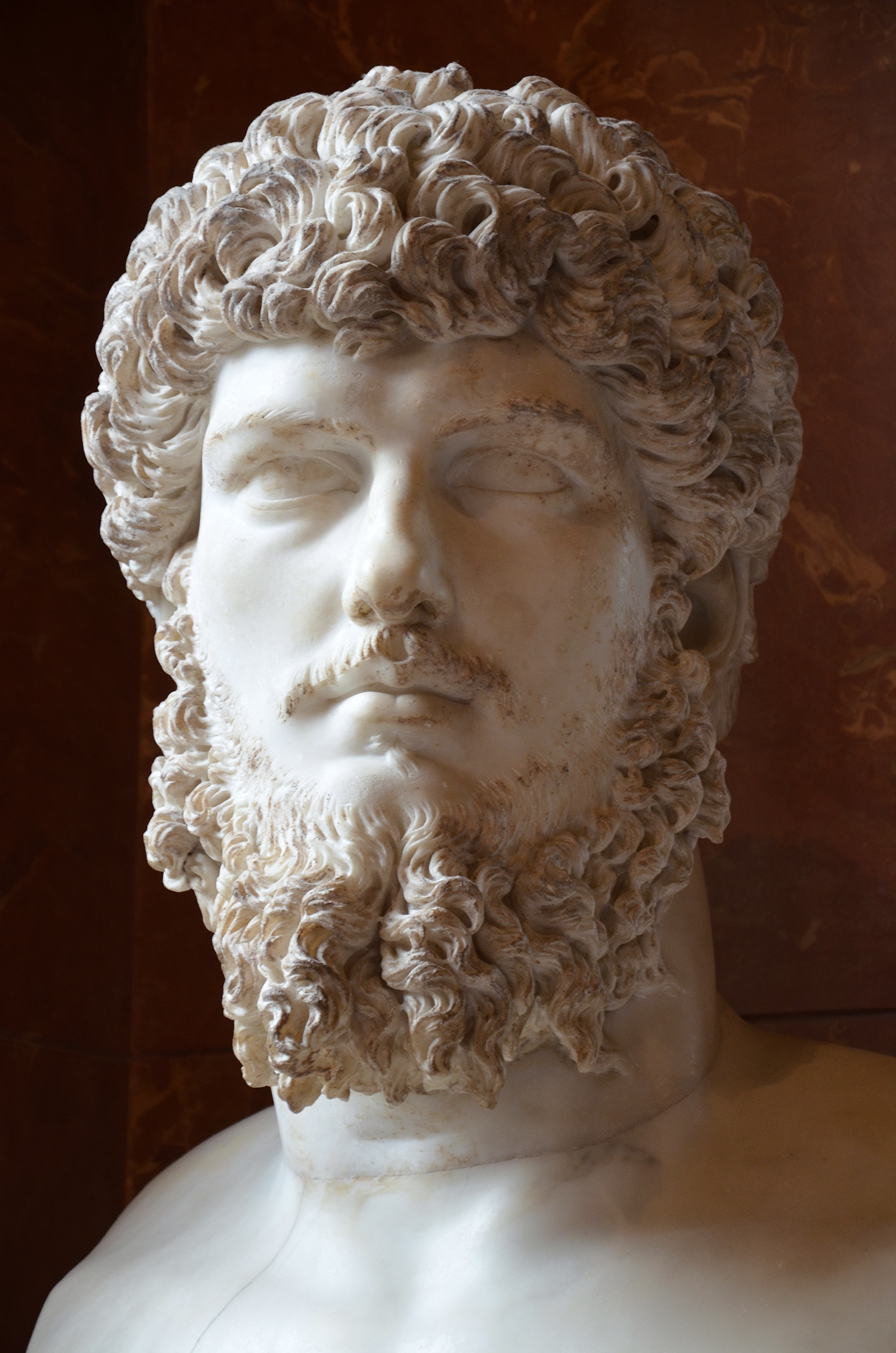
Colossal head of Lucius Verus (mounted on a modern bust), from a villa belonging to him in Acqua Traversa near Rome, between 180 and 183 AD, Louvre Museum, Paris

More news arrived: Attidius Cornelianus's army had been defeated in battle against the Parthians, and retreated in disarray. Reinforcements were dispatched for the Parthian frontier. Publius Julius Geminius Marcianus, an African senator commanding X Gemina at Vindobona (Vienna), left for Cappadocia with detachments from the Danubian legions. Three full legions were also sent east: I Minervia from Bonn in Upper Germany, II Adiutrix from Aquincum, and V Macedonica from Troesmis.

The northern frontiers were strategically weakened; frontier governors were told to avoid conflict wherever possible. Attidius Cornelianus himself was replaced by Marcus Annius Libo, Marcus's first cousin. He was young—his first consulship was in 161, so he was probably in his early thirties—and, as a mere patrician, lacked military experience. Marcus had chosen a reliable man rather than a talented one.

Marcus took a four-day public holiday at Alsium, a resort town on the Etrurian coast. He was too anxious to relax. Writing to Fronto, he declared that he would not speak about his holiday. Fronto replied ironically: "What? Do I not know that you went to Alsium with the intention of devoting yourself to games, joking and complete leisure for four whole days?" He encouraged Marcus to rest, calling on the example of his predecessors (Pius had enjoyed exercise in the palaestra, fishing, and comedy), going so far as to write up a fable about the gods' division of the day between morning and evening—Marcus had apparently been spending most of his evenings on judicial matters instead of at leisure. Marcus could not take Fronto's advice. "I have duties hanging over me that can hardly be begged off," he wrote back. Marcus put on Fronto's voice to chastise himself: "'Much good has my advice done you', you will say." He had rested, and would rest often, but "—this devotion to duty. Who knows better than you how demanding it is?"

Fronto sent Marcus a selection of reading material, including Cicero's pro lege Manilia, in which the orator had argued in favor of Pompey taking supreme command in the Mithridatic War. It was an apt reference (Pompey's war had taken him to Armenia), and may have had some impact on the decision to send Lucius to the eastern front. "You will find in it many chapters aptly suited to your present counsels, concerning the choice of army commanders, the interests of allies, the protection of provinces, the discipline of the soldiers, the qualifications required for commanders in the field and elsewhere [...] (Note: The text breaks off here.)" To settle his unease over the course of the Parthian War, Fronto wrote Marcus a long and considered letter, full of historical references. In modern editions of Fronto's works, it is labeled De bello Parthico (On the Parthian War). There had been reverses in Rome's past, Fronto writes, at Allia, at Caudium, at Cannae, at Numantia, Cirta, and Carrhae; under Trajan, Hadrian, and Pius; but, in the end, Romans had always prevailed over their enemies: "always and everywhere [Mars] has changed our troubles into successes and our terrors into triumphs".

==== Lucius's dispatch and journey east (162–163?) ====
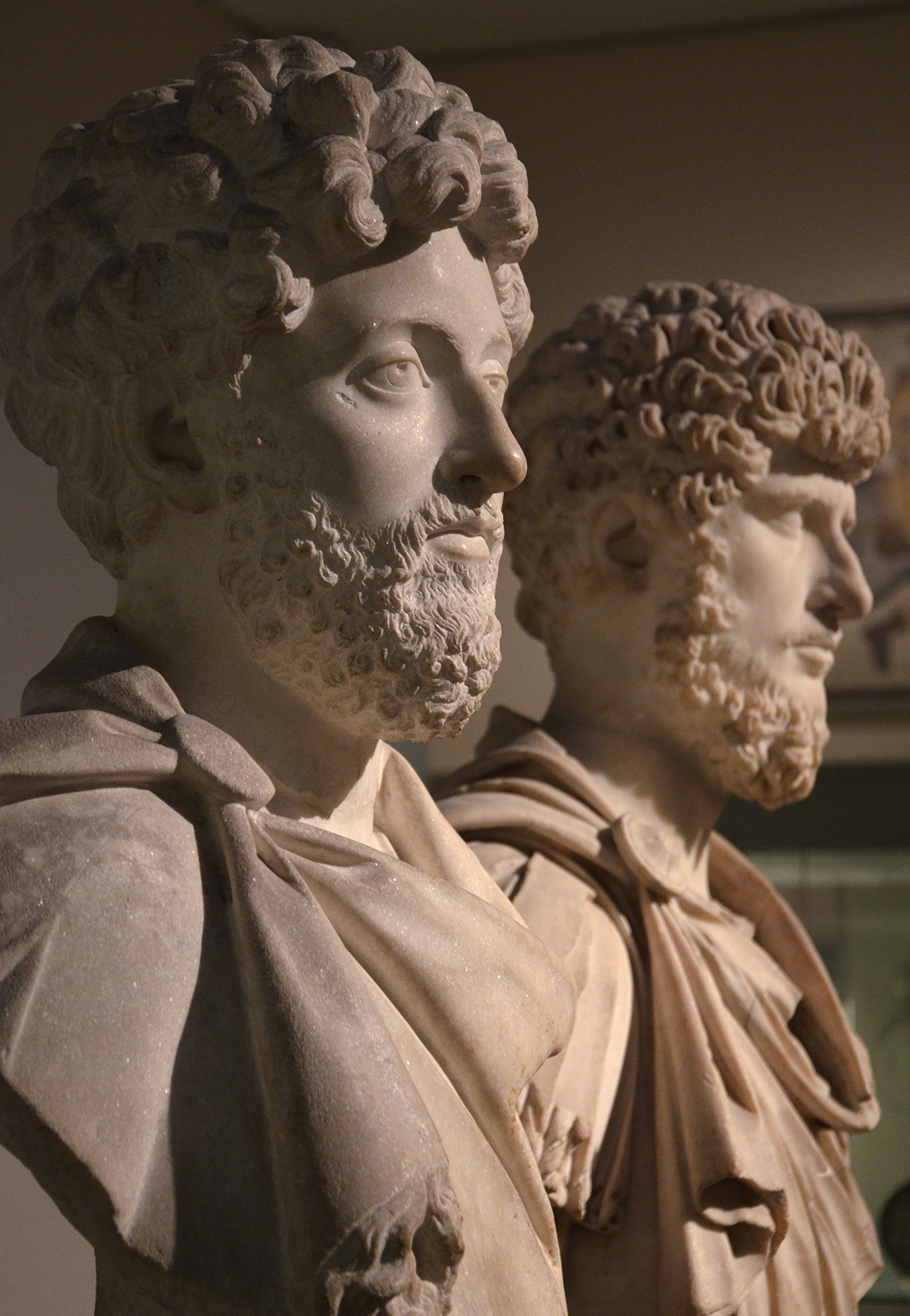
Busts of the co-emperors Marcus Aurelius (left) and Lucius Verus (right), British Museum

Over the winter of 161–62, as more troubling news arrived—a rebellion was brewing in Syria—it was decided that Lucius should direct the Parthian War in person. He was stronger and healthier than Marcus, the argument went, more suited to military activity. Lucius's biographer suggests ulterior motives: to restrain Lucius's debaucheries, to make him thrifty, to reform his morals by the terror of war, to realize that he was an emperor. (Note: Birley believes there is some truth in these considerations.) Whatever the case, the senate gave its assent, and Lucius left. Marcus remained in Rome; the city "demanded the presence of an emperor".

Furius Victorinus, one of the two praetorian prefects, was sent with Lucius, as were a pair of senators, M. Pontius Laelianus Larcius Sabinus and M. Iallius Bassus, and part of the praetorian guard. Victorinus had previously served as procurator of Galatia, giving him some experience with eastern affairs. (Note: Victorinus had also served in Britain, on the Danube, in Spain, as prefect of the Italian fleets, as prefect of Egypt, and in many posts in Rome itself.) Moreover, he was far more qualified than his praetorian partner, Cornelius Repentinus, who was said to owe his office to the influence of Pius's mistress, Galeria Lysistrate. Repentinus had the rank of a senator, but no real access to senatorial circles—his was merely a decorative title. Since a prefect had to accompany the guard, Victorinus was the clear choice.

Laelianus had been governor of both Pannonias and Governor of Syria in 153; thus he had first-hand knowledge of the eastern army and military strategy on the frontiers. He was made comes Augustorum ("companion of the emperors") for his service. Laelianus was, in the words of Fronto, "a serious man and an old-fashioned disciplinarian". Bassus had been Governor of Lower Moesia, and was also made comes. Lucius selected his favorite freedmen, including Geminus, Agaclytus, Coedes, Eclectus, and Nicomedes, who gave up his duties as praefectus vehiculorum to run the commissariat of the expeditionary force. The fleet of Misenum was charged with transporting the Emperor and general communications and transport.

Lucius left in the summer of 162 to take a ship from Brundisium; Marcus followed him as far as Capua. Lucius feasted himself in the country houses along his route, and hunted at Apulia. He fell ill at Canosa, probably afflicted with a mild stroke, and took to bed. Marcus made prayers to the gods for his safety in front of the senate, and hurried south to see him. Fronto was upset at the news, but was reassured when Lucius sent him a letter describing his treatment and recovery. In his reply, Fronto urged his pupil to moderate his desires, and recommended a few days of quiet bedrest. Lucius was better after three days' fasting and a bloodletting.

Verus continued eastward via Corinth and Athens, accompanied by musicians and singers as if in a royal progress. At Athens he stayed with Herodes Atticus, and joined the Eleusinian Mysteries. During sacrifice, a falling star was observed in the sky, shooting west to east. He stopped in Ephesus, where he is attested at the estate of the local aristocrat Publius Vedius Antoninus, and made an unexpected stopover at Erythrae. The journey continued by ship through the Aegean and the southern coasts of Asia Minor, lingering in the famed pleasure resorts of Pamphylia and Cilicia, before arriving in Antioch. It is not known how long Verus's journey east took; he might not have arrived in Antioch until after 162. Statius Priscus, meanwhile, must have already arrived in Cappadocia; he would earn fame in 163 for successful generalship.

==== Luxury and logistics at Antioch (162?–165) ====
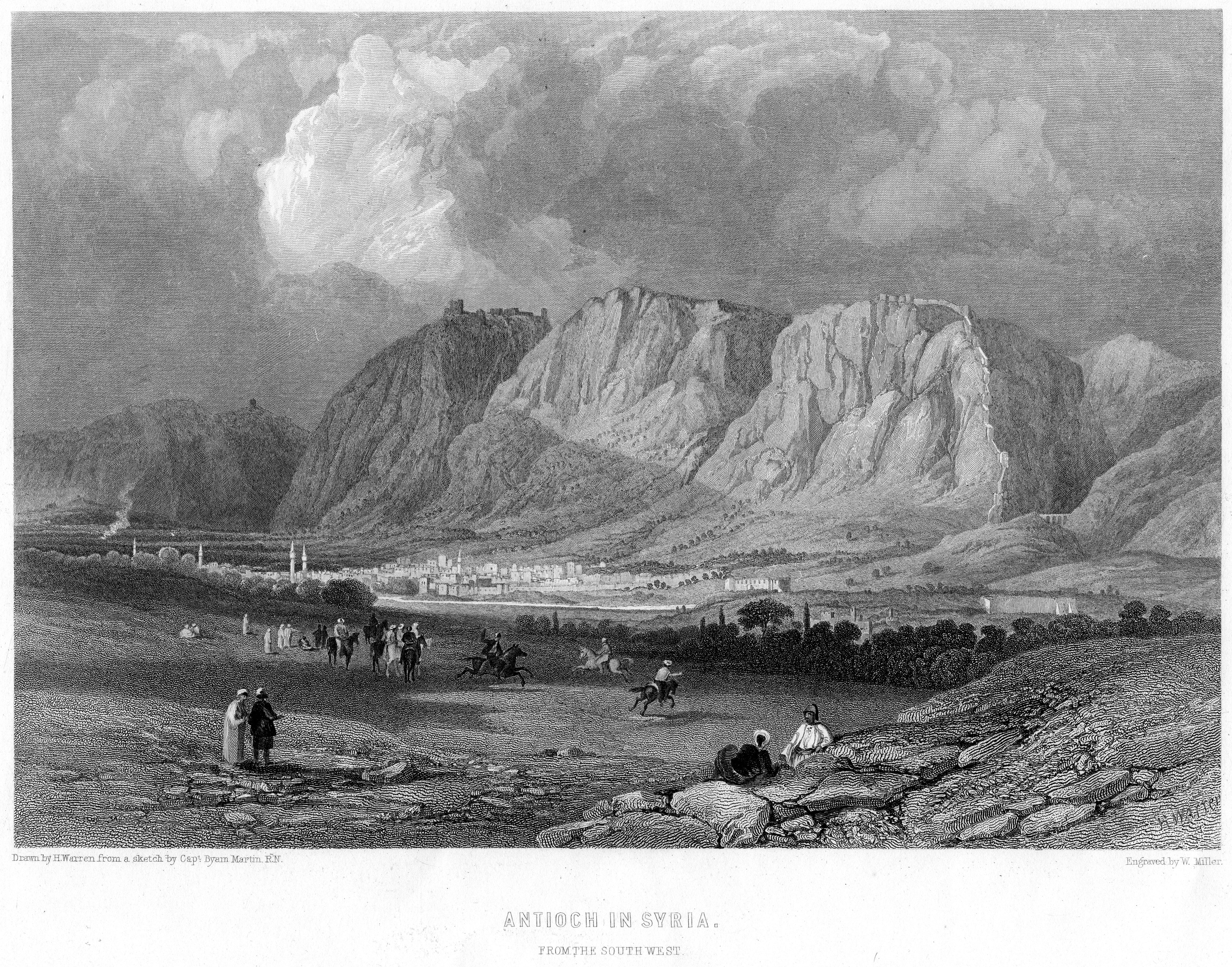
Antioch from the southwest (engraving by William Miller after a drawing by H. Warren from a sketch by Captain Byam Martin, R.N., 1866)

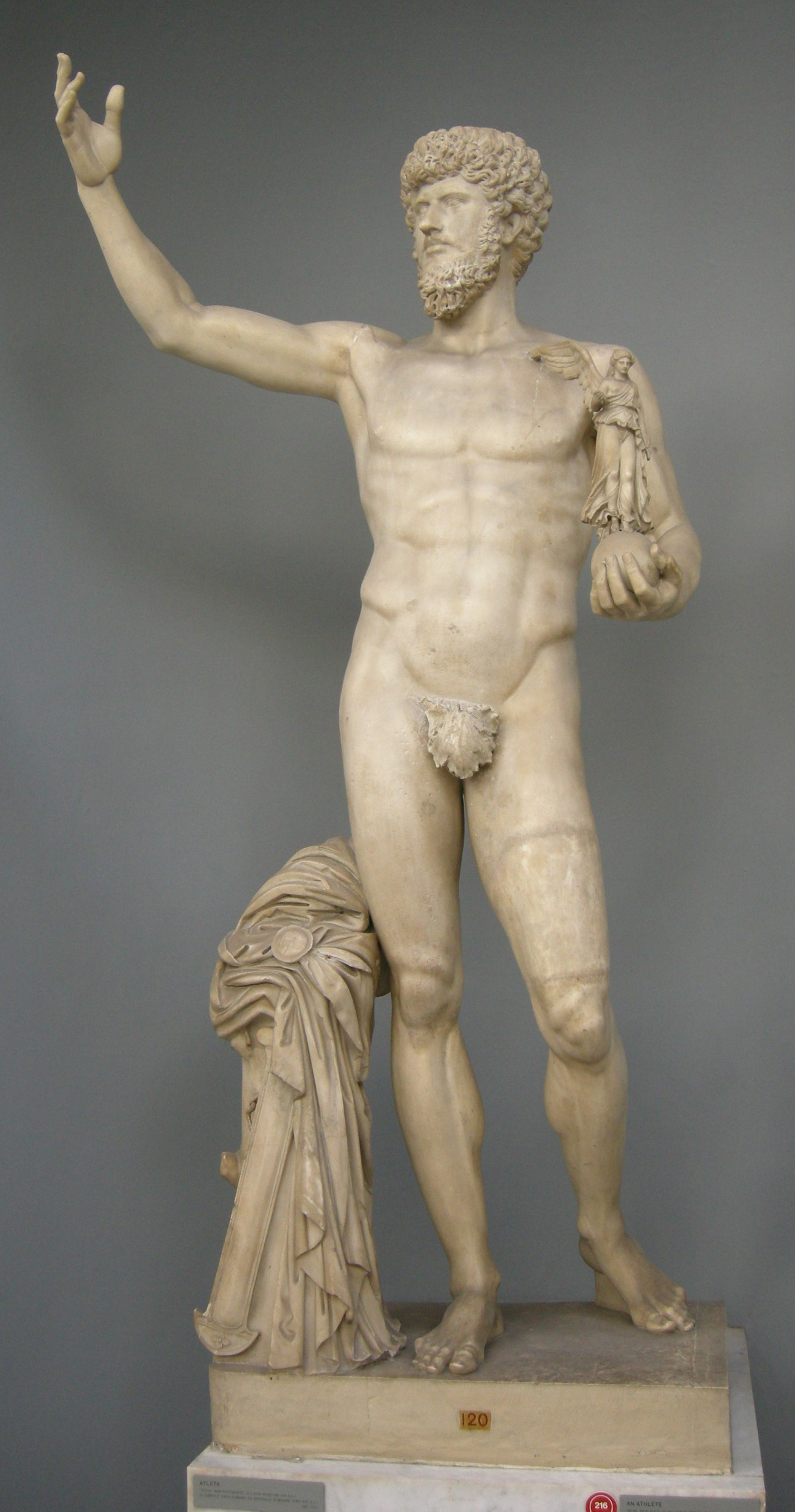
Statue of Lucius Verus on a body modelled after a sculpture by the ancient Athenian sculptor Myron, Vatican Museums

Lucius spent most of the campaign in Antioch, though he wintered at Laodicea and summered at Daphne, a resort just outside Antioch. He took up a mistress named Panthea, (Note: Or "Pantheia".) from Smyrna. The biographer calls her a "low-born girl-friend", but she was described as a "woman of perfect beauty" by Lucius. One biographer has postulated that Panthea may have been more beautiful than any of Phidias and Praxiteles' statues. The mistress was musically inclined and spoke Ionic Greek, spiced with Attic wit.

Panthea read Lucian's first draft, and criticized him for flattery. He had compared her to a goddess, which frightened her—she did not want to become the next Cassiopeia. She had power, too. She made Lucius shave his beard for her. The Syrians mocked him for this, as they did for much else.

Critics decried Lucius' luxurious lifestyle. He had taken to gambling, they said; he would "dice the whole night through". He enjoyed the company of actors. He made a special request for dispatches from Rome, to keep him updated on how his chariot teams were doing. He brought a golden statue of the Greens' horse Volucer around with him, as a token of his team spirit. Fronto defended his pupil against some of these claims: the Roman people needed Lucius' bread and circuses to keep them in check. (Note: Fronto called it "the corn-dole and public spectacles" (annona et spectaculis), preferring his own pompous rephrase to Juvenal's plain panem et circenses. (Fronto was, in any case, unfamiliar with Juvenal; the author was out of style through the classicizing mania of the Second Sophistic, and would not become popular until the later fourth century).)

This, at least, is how the biographer has it. The whole section of the vita dealing with Lucius' debaucheries (HA Verus 4.4–6.6) is an insertion into a narrative otherwise entirely cribbed from an earlier source. Some few passages seem genuine; (Note: In the judgment of T.D. Barnes: 4.8, "He was very fond also of charioteers, favouring the 'Greens'."; 4.10, "He never needed much sleep, however; and his digestion was excellent."; perhaps 5.7, "After the banquet, moreover, they diced until dawn.".) others take and elaborate something from the original. (Note: In the judgment of T.D. Barnes: 4.8 ("He was very fond also of charioteers, favouring the 'Greens'.") and 10.9 ("Among other articles of extravagance he had a crystal goblet, named Volucer after that horse of which he had been very fond, that surpassed the capacity of any human draught.") are the seed for 6.2–6, "And finally, even at Rome, when he was present and seated with Marcus, he suffered many insults from the 'Blues,' because he had outrageously, as they maintained, taken sides against them. For he had a golden statue made of the 'Green' horse Volucer, and this he always carried around with him; indeed, he was wont to put raisins and nuts instead of barley in this horse's manger and to order him brought to him, in the House of Tiberius, covered with a blanket dyed with purple, and he built him a tomb, when he died, on the Vatican Hill. It was because of this horse that gold pieces and prizes first began to be demanded for horses, and in such honour was this horse held, that frequently a whole peck of gold pieces was demanded for him by the faction of the 'Greens'."; 10.8, "He was somewhat halting in speech, a reckless gambler, ever of an extravagant mode of life, and in many respects, save only that he was not cruel or given to acting, a second Nero.", for the comparison with other "bad emperors" at 4.6 ("...he so rivalled Caligula, Nero, and Vitellius in their vices..."), and, significantly, the excuse to use Suetonius.) The rest is by the biographer himself, relying on nothing better than his own imagination.

Lucius faced quite a task. Fronto described the scene in terms recalling Corbulo's arrival one hundred years before. The Syrian army had turned soft during the east's long peace. They spent more time at the city's open-air cafés than in their quarters. Under Lucius, training was stepped up. Pontius Laelianus ordered that their saddles be stripped of their padding. Gambling and drinking were sternly policed. Fronto wrote that Lucius was on foot at the head of his army as often as on horseback. He personally inspected soldiers in the field and at camp, including the sick bay.

Lucius sent Fronto few messages at the beginning of the war. He sent Fronto a letter apologizing for his silence. He would not detail plans that could change within a day, he wrote. Moreover, there was little thus far to show for his work: "not even yet has anything been accomplished such as to make me wish to invite you to share in the joy". Lucius did not want Fronto to suffer the anxieties that had kept him up day and night. One reason for Lucius' reticence may have been the collapse of Parthian negotiations after the Roman conquest of Armenia. Lucius' presentation of terms was seen as cowardice. The Parthians were not in the mood for peace.

Lucius needed to make extensive imports into Antioch, so he opened a sailing route up the Orontes. Because the river breaks across a cliff before reaching the city, Lucius ordered that a new canal be dug. After the project was completed, the Orontes' old riverbed dried up, exposing massive bones—the bones of a giant. Pausanias says they were from a beast "more than eleven cubits" tall; Philostratus says that it was "thirty cubits" tall. The oracle at Claros declared that they were the bones of the river's spirit. These bones would later be understood to be that of several large unspecified animals.

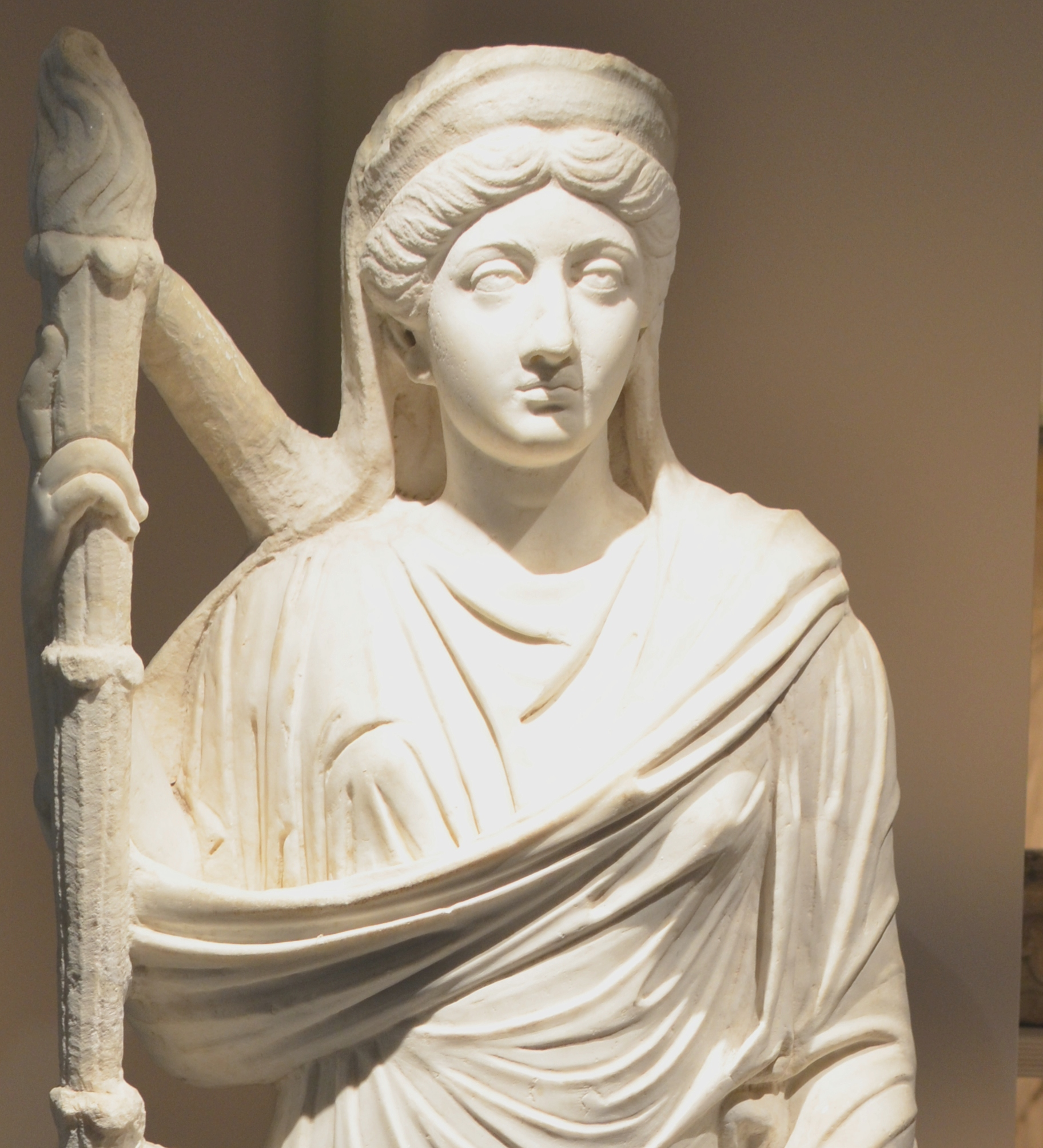
Lucilla depicted as Ceres

In the middle of the war, perhaps in autumn 163 or early 164, Lucius made a trip to Ephesus to be married to Marcus' daughter Lucilla. Lucilla's thirteenth birthday was in March 163; whatever the date of her marriage, she was not yet fifteen. Marcus had moved up the date: perhaps stories of Panthea had disturbed him. Lucilla was accompanied by her mother Faustina and M. Vettulenus Civica Barbarus, the half-brother of Lucius' father.

Marcus may have planned to accompany them all the way to Smyrna (the biographer says he told the senate he would); this did not happen. Marcus only accompanied the group as far as Brundisium, where they boarded a ship for the east. Marcus returned to Rome immediately thereafter, and sent out special instructions to his proconsuls not to give the group any official reception. Lucilla would bear three of Lucius' children in the coming years. Lucilla became Lucilla Augusta.

==== Counterattack and victory (163–166) ====
I Minervia and V Macedonica, under the legates M. Claudius Fronto and P. Martius Verus, served under Statius Priscus in Armenia, earning success for Roman arms during the campaign season of 163, including the capture of the Armenian capital Artaxata. At the end of the year, Verus took the title Armeniacus, despite having never seen combat; Marcus declined to accept the title until the following year. When Lucius was hailed as imperator again, however, Marcus did not hesitate to take the Imperator II with him. The army of Syria was reinforced by II Adiutrix and Danubian legions under X Gemina's legate Geminius Marcianus.

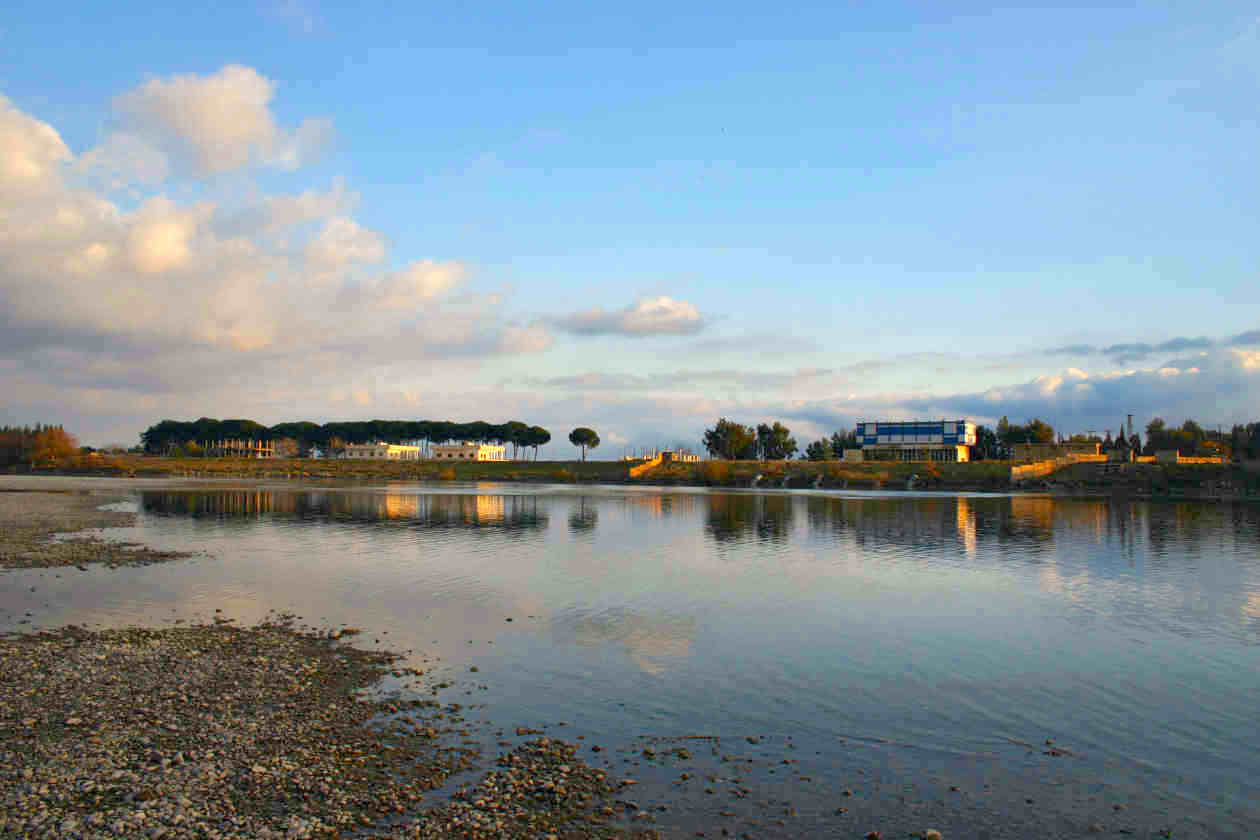
The Euphrates river near Raqqa, Syria

Occupied Armenia was reconstructed on Roman terms. In 164, a new capital, Kaine Polis ('New City'), replaced Artaxata. On Birley's reckoning, it was thirty miles closer to the Roman border. Detachments from Cappadocian legions are attested at Echmiadzin, beneath the southern face of Mount Ararat, 400 km east of Satala. It would have meant a march of twenty days or more, through mountainous terrain, from the Roman border; a "remarkable example of imperialism", in the words of Fergus Millar.

A new king was installed: a Roman senator of consular rank and Arsacid descent, Gaius Julius Sohaemus. He may not even have been crowned in Armenia; the ceremony may have taken place in Antioch, or even Ephesus. Sohaemus was hailed on the imperial coinage of 164 under the legend Rex armeniis Datus: Verus sat on a throne with his staff while Sohaemus stood before him, saluting the emperor.

In 163, while Statius Priscus was occupied in Armenia, the Parthians intervened in Osroene, a Roman client in upper Mesopotamia, just east of Syria, with its capital at Edessa. They deposed the country's leader, Mannus, and replaced him with their own nominee, who would remain in office until 165. (The Edessene coinage record actually begins at this point, with issues showing Vologases IV on the obverse and "Wael the king" (Syriac: W'L MLK') on the reverse). In response, Roman forces were moved downstream, to cross the Euphrates at a more southerly point.

On the evidence of Lucian, the Parthians still held the southern, Roman bank of the Euphrates (in Syria) as late as 163 (he refers to a battle at Sura, which is on the southern side of the river). Before the end of the year, however, Roman forces had moved north to occupy Dausara and Nicephorium on the northern, Parthian bank. (Note: The letter noting the victories (Ad Verum Imperator 2.1) dates to 164 (Fronto makes a reference to Marcus' delay in taking the Armeniacus; since he took the title in 164, the letter can be no earlier than that date), but the battles themselves date to 163.) Soon after the conquest of the north bank of the Euphrates, other Roman forces moved on Osroene from Armenia, taking Anthemusia, a town south-west of Edessa. There was little movement in 164; most of the year was spent on preparations for a renewed assault on Parthian territory.

==== Invasion of Mesopotamia (165) ====
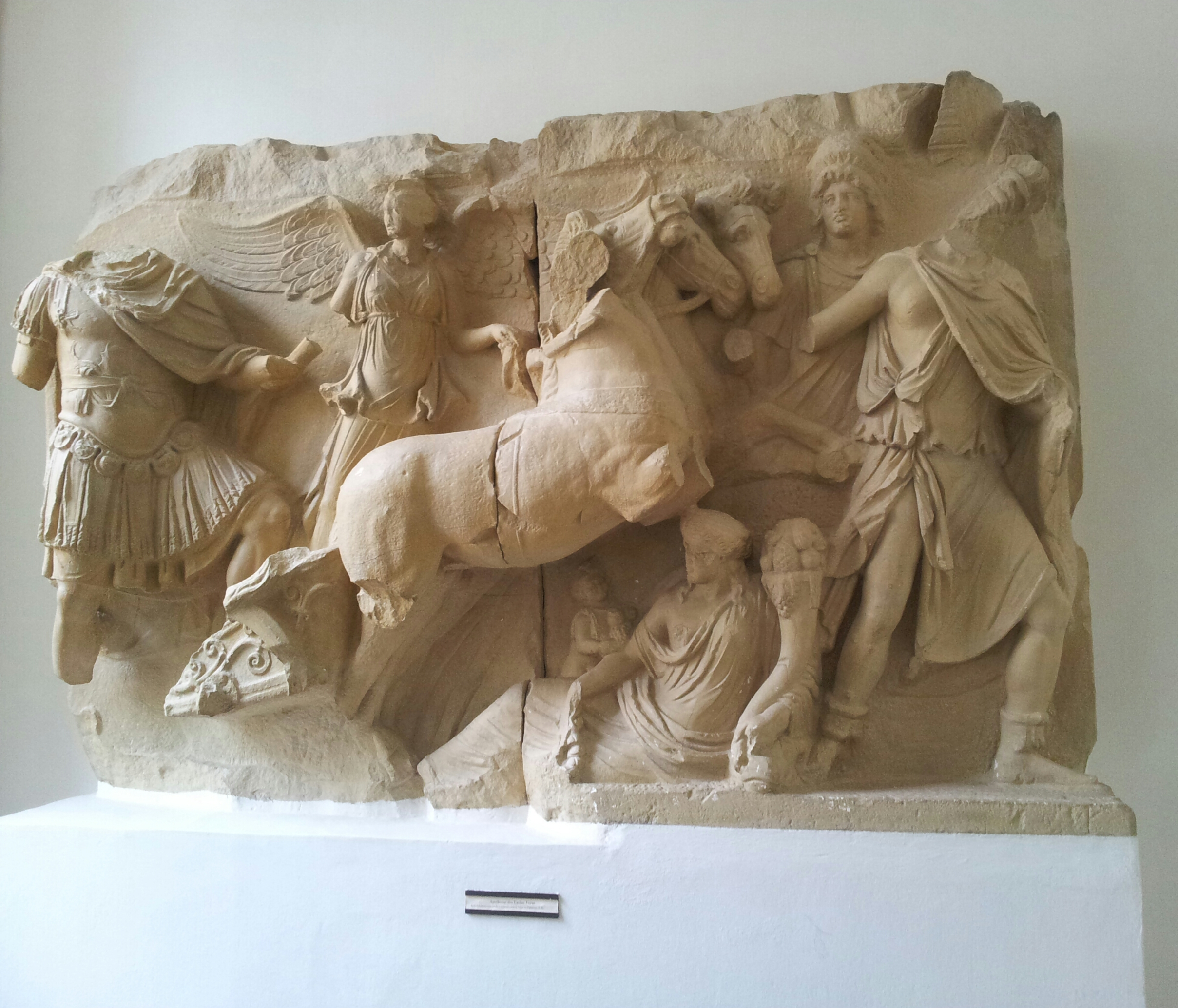
The apotheosis of Lucius Verus, 2nd-century relief plates from Ephesus, on display at Humboldt University of Berlin

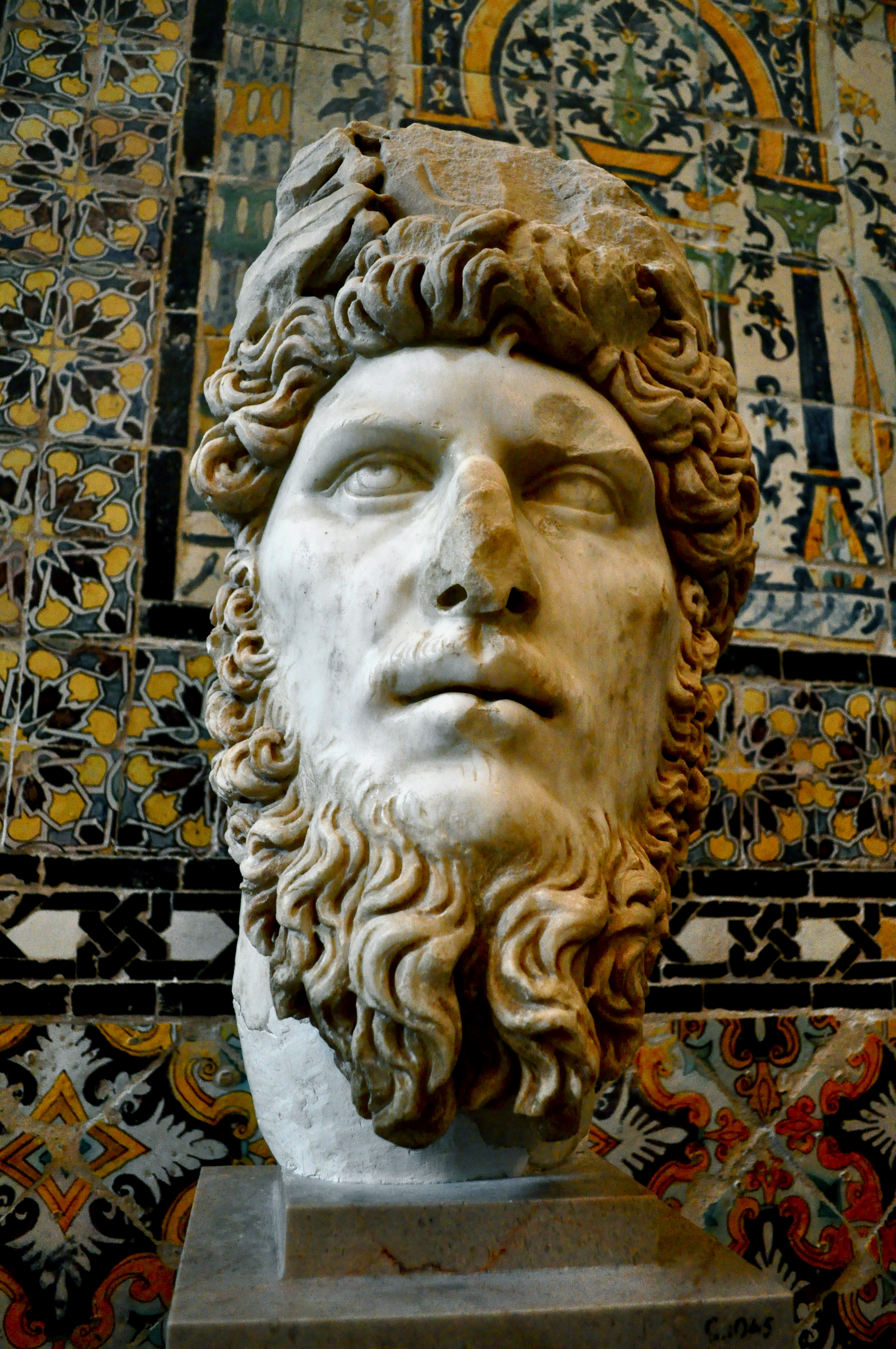
Ancient bust in the Bardo National Museum, Tunis, 2nd century AD

In 165, Roman forces, perhaps led by Martius Verus and the V Macedonica, moved on Mesopotamia. Edessa was re-occupied, Mannus re-installed. His coinage resumed, too: 'Ma'nu the king' (Syriac: M'NW MLK') or Antonine dynasts on the obverse, and 'King Mannos, friend of Romans' (Greek: Basileus Mannos Philorōmaios) on the reverse. The Parthians retreated to Nisibis, but this too was besieged and captured. The Parthian army dispersed in the Tigris; their general Chosrhoes swam down the river and made his hideout in a cave. A second force, under Avidius Cassius and the III Gallica, moved down the Euphrates, and fought a major battle at Dura.

By the end of the year, Cassius' army had reached the twin metropolises of Mesopotamia: Seleucia on the right bank of the Tigris and Ctesiphon on the left. Ctesiphon was taken and its royal palace set to flame. The citizens of Seleucia, still largely Greek (the city had been commissioned and settled as a capital of the Seleucid Empire, one of Alexander the Great's successor kingdoms), opened its gates to the invaders. The city got sacked nonetheless, leaving a black mark on Lucius' reputation. Excuses were sought, or invented: the official version had it that the Seleucids broke faith first. Whatever the case, the sacking marks a particularly destructive chapter in Seleucia's long decline.

Cassius' army, although suffering from a shortage of supplies and the effects of a plague contracted in Seleucia, made it back to Roman territory safely. Iunius Maximus, a young tribunus laticlavius serving in III Gallica under Cassius, took the news of the victory to Rome. Maximus received a generous cash bounty (dona) for bringing the good news, and immediate promotion to the quaestorship. Lucius took the title Parthicus Maximus, and he and Marcus were hailed as imperatores again, earning the title 'imp. III'. Cassius' army returned to the field in 166, crossing over the Tigris into Media. Lucius took the title 'Medicus', and the emperors were again hailed as imperatores, becoming 'imp. IV' in imperial titulature. Marcus took the Parthicus Maximus now, after another tactful delay.

Most of the credit for the war's success must be ascribed to subordinate generals. The forces that advanced on Osroene were led by M. Claudius Fronto, an Asian provincial of Greek descent who had led I Minervia in Armenia under Priscus. He was probably the first senator in his family. Fronto was consul for 165, probably in honor of the capture of Edessa. P. Martius Verus had led V Macedonica to the front, and also served under Priscus. Martius Verus was a westerner, whose patria was perhaps Tolosa in Gallia Narbonensis.

The most prominent general, however, was C. Avidius Cassius, commander of III Gallica, one of the Syrian legions. Cassius was a young senator of low birth from the north Syrian town of Cyrrhus. His father, Heliodorus, had not been a senator, but was nonetheless a man of some standing: he had been Hadrian's ab epistulis, followed the emperor on his travels, and was prefect of Egypt at the end of Hadrian's reign. Cassius also, with no small sense of self-worth, claimed descent from the Seleucid kings. Cassius and Martius Verus, still probably in their mid-thirties, took the consulships for 166.

=== Years in Rome ===
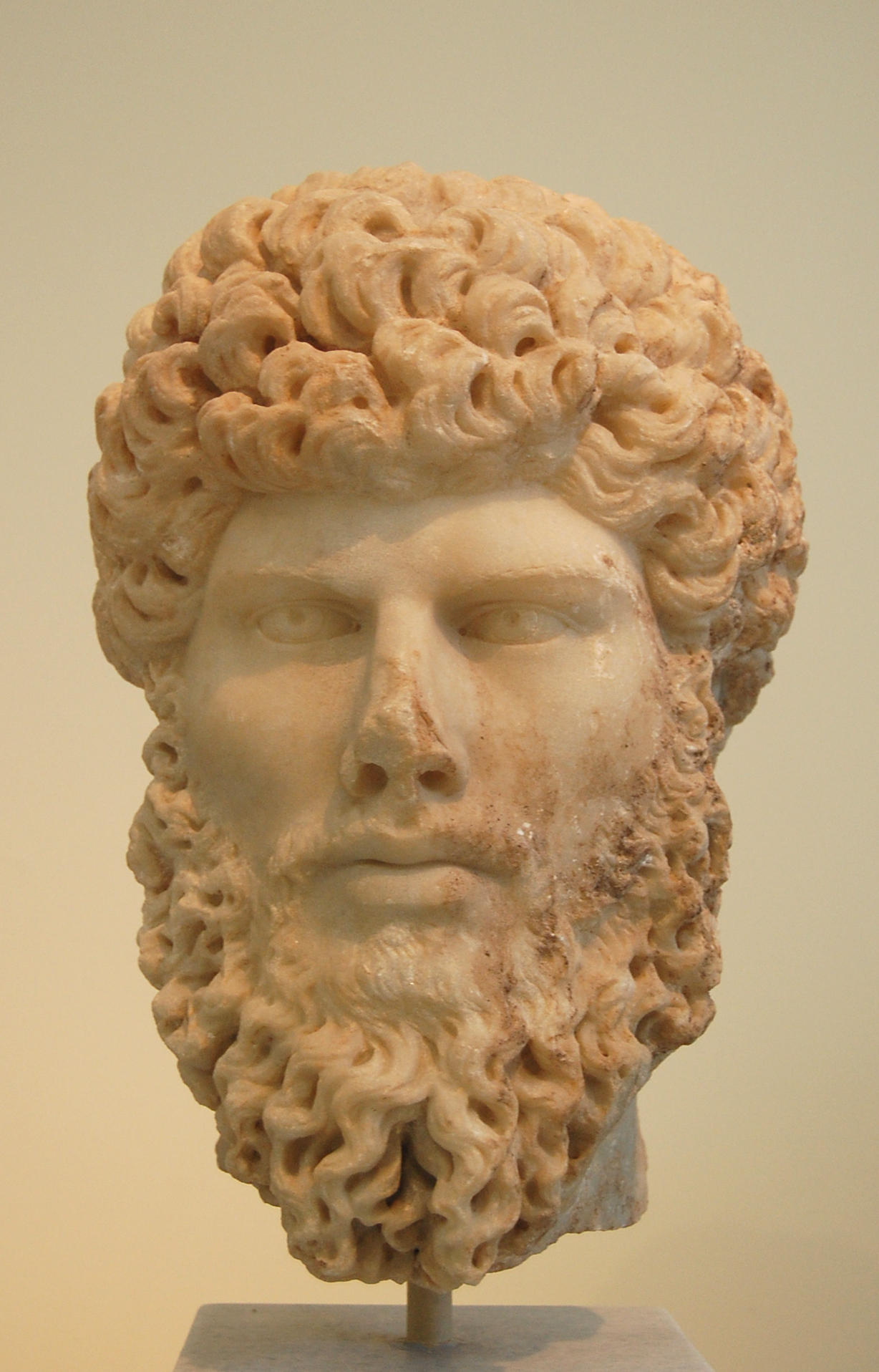
Portrait head of Verus found in Athens (National Archaeological Museum of Athens). He used to sprinkle gold-dust on his blond hair to make it brighter.

The next two years (166–168) were spent in Rome. According to the Historia Augusta, Verus continued with his glamorous lifestyle and kept the troupe of actors and favourites with him. He had a tavern built in his house, probably at Acquatraversa, where he celebrated parties with his friends until dawn. He also enjoyed roaming around the city among the population, without acknowledging his identity. The games of the circus were another passion in his life, especially chariot racing. Marcus Aurelius disapproved of his conduct but, since Verus continued to perform his official tasks with efficiency, there was little that he could do.

=== Wars on the Danube and death ===
In 168 war broke out in the Danubian border when the Marcomanni invaded the Roman territory. This war would last until 180, but Verus did not see the end of it. In 168, as Verus and Marcus Aurelius returned to Rome from the field, Verus fell severely ill and died soon afterwards. Some authors suggest that he was poisoned, but this is unlikely. He may have died due to the widespread epidemic known as the Antonine Plague.

Despite the minor differences between them, Marcus Aurelius grieved the loss of his adoptive brother. He accompanied the body to Rome, where he offered games to honour his memory. After the funeral, the senate declared Verus divine to be worshipped as Divus Verus.

== Nerva–Antonine family tree ==
Nerva–Antonine family tree

Q. Marcius Barea Soranus	Q. Marcius Barea Sura	Antonia Furnilla	M. Cocceius Nerva	Sergia Plautilla	P. Aelius Hadrianus
Titus (r. 79–81)	Marcia Furnilla	Marcia	Trajanus Pater	Nerva (r. 96–98)	Ulpia (Note: Sister of Trajan's father: Giacosa (1977), p. 7.)	Aelius Hadrianus Marullinus
Flavia (Note: Giacosa (1977), p. 8.)	Marciana (Note: Levick (2014), p. 161.)	C. Salonius Matidius (Note: Husband of Ulpia Marciana: Levick (2014), p. 161.)	Trajan (r. 98–117)	Plotina	P. Acilius Attianus	P. Aelius Afer (Note: Giacosa (1977), p. 7.)	Paulina Major (Note: DIR contributor (Herbert W. Benario, 2000), "Hadrian".)
Lucius Mindius (2)	Libo Rupilius Frugi (3)	Salonia Matidia (Note: Giacosa (1977), p. 9.)	L. Vibius Sabinus (1) (Note: Husband of Salonia Matidia: Levick (2014), p. 161.)
Paulina Minor	L. Julius Ursus Servianus (Note: Smith (1870), "Julius Servianus".)
Matidia Minor	Sabina	Hadrian (Note: Smith (1870), "Hadrian", pp. 319–322.) (r. 117–138)	Antinous (Note: Lover of Hadrian: Lambert (1984), p. 99 and passim; deification: Lamber (1984), pp. 2–5, etc.)
C. Fuscus Salinator I	Julia Serviana Paulina
M. Annius Verus (Note: Husband of Rupilia Faustina: Levick (2014), p. 163.)	Rupilia Faustina (Note: Levick (2014), p. 163.) (Note: It is uncertain whether Rupilia Faustina was Frugi's daughter by Salonia Matidia or another woman.)	Boionia Procilla	Cn. Arrius Antoninus
L. Ceionius Commodus	Appia Severa	C. Fuscus Salinator II
L. Caesennius Paetus	Arria Antonina	Arria Fadilla (Note: Levick (2014), p. 162.)	T. Aurelius Fulvus
L. Caesennius Antoninus	L. Commodus	Plautia	unknown (Note: Levick (2014), p. 164.)	C. Avidius Nigrinus
M. Annius Verus	Calvisia Domitia Lucilla (Note: Wife of M. Annius Verus: Giacosa (1977), p. 10.)	Fundania (Note: Wife of M. Annius Libo: Levick (2014), p. 163.)	M. Annius Libo	Faustina	Antoninus Pius (r. 138–161)	L. Aelius Caesar	Avidia
Cornificia	Marcus Aurelius (r. 161–180) (Note: Giacosa (1977), p. 10.)	Faustina Minor	C. Avidius Cassius (Note: The epitomator of Cassius Dio (72.22) gives the story that Faustina the Elder promised to marry Avidius Cassius. This is also echoed in HA "Marcus Aurelius" 24.)	Aurelia Fadilla	Lucius Verus (r. 161–169) (1)	Ceionia Fabia	Plautius Quintillus (Note: Husband of Ceionia Fabia: Levick (2014), p. 164.)	Q. Servilius Pudens	Ceionia Plautia
Cornificia Minor (Note: Levick (2014), p. 117.)	M. Petronius Sura	Commodus (r. 177–192)	Fadilla	M. Annius Verus Caesar	Ti. Claudius Pompeianus (2)	Lucilla	M. Plautius Quintillus	Junius Licinius Balbus	Servilia Ceionia
Petronius Antoninus	L. Aurelius Agaclytus (2)	Aurelia Sabina	L. Antistius Burrus (1)	Plautius Quintillus	Plautia Servilla	C. Furius Sabinus Timesitheus	Maecia Faustina	Junius Licinius Balbus?
Furia Sabinia Tranquillina	Gordian III (r. 238–244)

- (1) = 1st spouse
- (2) = 2nd spouse
- (3) = 3rd spouse
- Reddish-purple indicates emperor of the Nerva–Antonine dynasty
  lighter purple indicates designated imperial heir of said dynasty who never reigned
  grey indicates unsuccessful imperial aspirants
  bluish-purple indicates emperors of other dynasties
- dashed lines indicate adoption; dotted lines indicate love affairs/unmarried relationships
- Small Caps = posthumously deified (Augusti, Augustae, or other)

Notes:

Except where otherwise noted, the notes below indicate that an individual's parentage is as shown in the above family tree.

References:
- DIR contributors (2000). "De Imperatoribus Romanis: An Online Encyclopedia of Roman Rulers and Their Families".
- Giacosa, Giorgio (1977). Women of the Caesars: Their Lives and Portraits on Coins. Translated by R. Ross Holloway. Milan: Edizioni Arte e Moneta. ISBN 0-8390-0193-2.
- Lambert, Royston (1984). Beloved and God: The Story of Hadrian and Antinous. New York: Viking. ISBN 0-670-15708-2.
- Levick, Barbara (2014). Faustina I and II: Imperial Women of the Golden Age. Oxford University Press. ISBN 978-0-19-537941-9.
- Smith, William, ed. (1870). Dictionary of Greek and Roman Biography and Mythology.

== See also ==
- Augustan History

== Citations ==
Lucius Verus Antonine dynasty Cadet branch of the Nervan-Antonian Dynasty Born: 15 December 130 Died: 169
Regnal titles
Preceded by Antoninus Pius	Roman emperor 161–169; With: Marcus Aurelius	Succeeded by Marcus Aurelius (alone)
Political offices
Preceded by Gaius Cattius Marcellus; Quintus Petiedius Gallus	Roman consul 154 with Titus Sextius Lateranus	Succeeded by (Prifernius?) Paetus; Marcus Nonius Macrinus
Preceded by Tiberius Oclatius Severus; Novius Sabinianus	Roman consul II; 161 with Marcus Aurelius III	Succeeded by Marcus Annius Libo; Q. Camurius Numisius Junior
Preceded by Marcus Vibius Liberalis; Publius Martius Verus	Roman consul III; 167 with Marcus Ummidius Quadratus Annianus	Succeeded by Quintus Caecilius Dentilianus; Marcus Antonius Pallas
