= Roman–Parthian War of 161–166 =

Conflict between the Roman and Parthian Empires

Roman–Parthian war of 161–166
- Part of the Roman–Parthian Wars
Date	161–166 AD
Location	Armenia, Mesopotamia and Media
Result	Roman victory
Territorial changes	Minor Roman gains in upper Mesopotamia

Belligerents
Roman Empire: Roman Egypt	Parthian Empire

Commanders and leaders
Lucius Verus; Avidius Cassius; Marcus Claudius Fronto; Marcus Statius Priscus; Publius Martius Verus	Vologases IV of Parthia; Chosrhoes

The Roman–Parthian War of 161–166 (also called the Parthian War of Lucius Verus) was fought between the Roman and Parthian Empires over Armenia and Upper Mesopotamia. It concluded in 166 after the Romans made successful campaigns into Lower Mesopotamia and Media and sacked Ctesiphon, the Parthian capital.

== Origins to Lucius' dispatch, 161–162 ==
On his deathbed in the spring of 161, Emperor Antoninus Pius had spoken of nothing but the state and the foreign kings who had wronged him. One of those kings, Vologases IV of Parthia, made his move in late summer or early autumn 161. Vologases entered the Kingdom of Armenia (then a Roman client state), expelled its king and installed his own—Pacorus, an Arsacid like himself. At the time of the invasion, the governor of Syria was Lucius Attidius Cornelianus. Attidius had been retained as governor even though his term had ended in 161, presumably to avoid giving the Parthians the chance to wrong-foot his replacement. The governor of Cappadocia, the front-line in all Armenian conflicts, was Marcus Sedatius Severianus, a Gaul with much experience in military matters. But living in the east had a deleterious effect on his character.

Alexander of Abonutichus, a prophet who carried a snake named Glycon around with him, had enraptured Severianus, as he had many others. Father-in-law to the respected senator Publius Mummius Sisenna Rutilianus, then-proconsul of Asia, Alexander was friends with many members of the east Roman elite. Alexander convinced Severianus that he could defeat the Parthians easily, and win glory for himself. Severianus led a legion (perhaps the IX Hispana) into Armenia, but was trapped by the great Parthian general Chosrhoes at Elegeia, a town just beyond the Cappadocian frontiers, past the headwaters of the Euphrates. Severianus made some attempt to fight Chosrhoes, but soon realized the futility of his campaign, and committed suicide. His legion was massacred, with around 5,000–6,000 Romans killed. The campaign had only lasted three days.

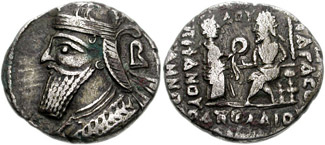
Coin of Vologases IV, king of Parthia, from 162

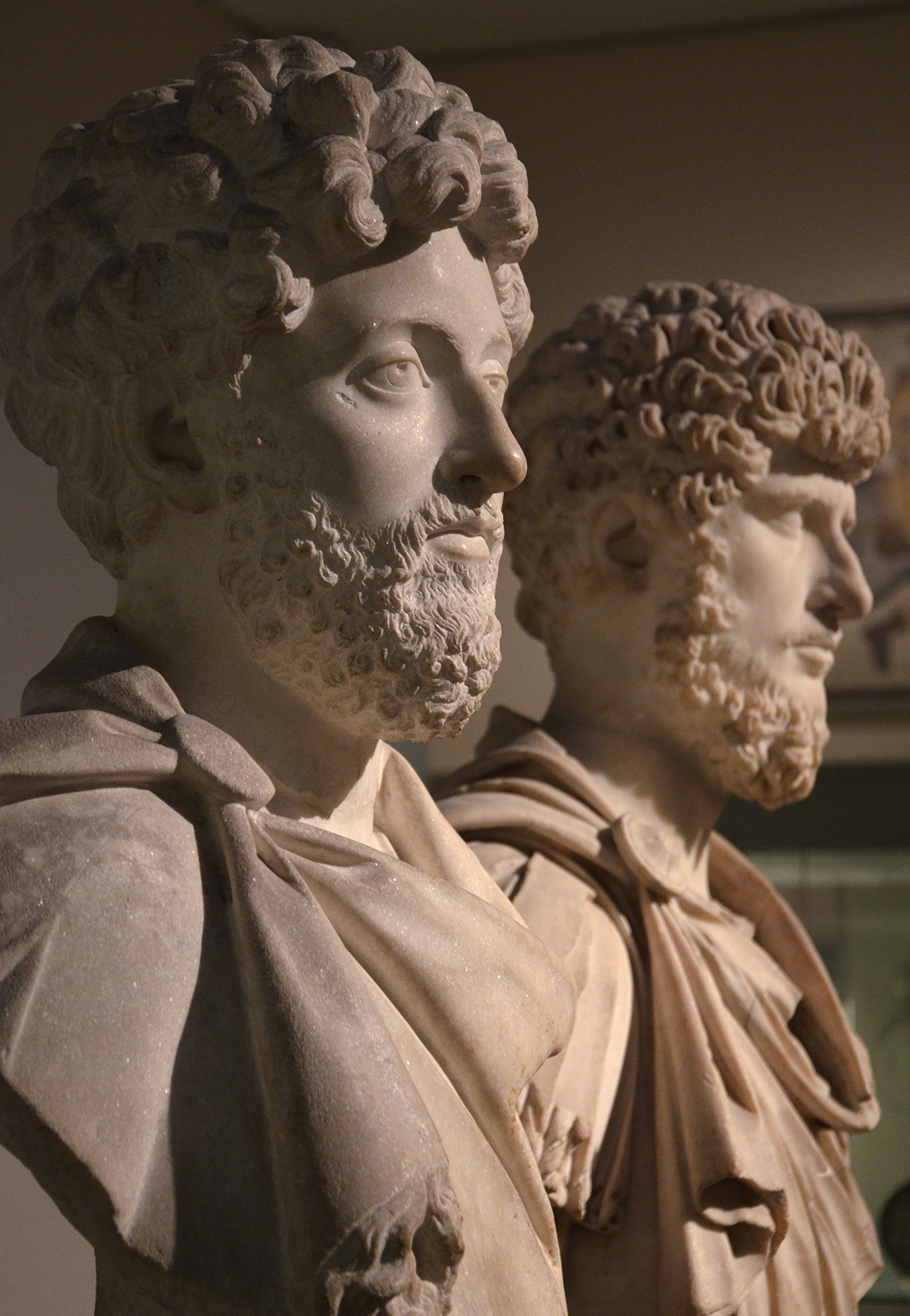
Busts of the co-emperors Marcus Aurelius (left) and Lucius Verus (right), British Museum

There was threat of war on other frontiers as well—in Britain, and in Raetia and Upper Germany, where the Chatti of the Taunus mountains had recently crossed over the limes. Marcus Aurelius, who had become emperor on Pius' death on 7 March 161, was unprepared. Pius seems to have given him no military experience; the Historia Augusta states that Marcus spent the whole of Pius' twenty-three-year reign at the emperor's side, and not in the provinces where most previous emperors had spent their early careers. (Note: Alan Cameron adduces the 5th-century writer Sidonius Apollinaris's comment that Marcus commanded "countless legions" vivente Pio (while Pius was alive) while contesting Birley's contention that Marcus had no military experience. (Neither Apollinaris nor the Historia Augusta (Birley's source) are particularly reliable on 2nd-century history.)) Marcus sent Marcus Statius Priscus to replace Severianus as governor of Cappadocia, while Sextus Calpurnius Agricola took Priscus' place as governor of Britain.

More bad news arrived: Attidius Cornelianus' army had been defeated in battle against the Parthians, and retreated in disarray. Reinforcements were dispatched for the Parthian frontier. Publius Julius Geminius Marcianus, an African senator commanding X Gemina at Vindobona (Vienna), left for Cappadocia with vexillations from the Danubian legions. Three full legions were also sent east: I Minervia from Bonn in Upper Germany, II Adiutrix from Aquincum, and V Macedonica from Troesmis. The northern frontiers were strategically weakened; frontier governors were told to avoid conflict wherever possible. Attidius Cornelianus himself was replaced by M. Annius Libo, Marcus' first cousin. He was young—his first consulship was in 161, so he was probably in his early thirties—and, as a mere patrician, lacked military experience. Marcus had chosen a reliable man rather than a talented one.

Marcus took a four-day public holiday at Alsium, a resort town on the Etrurian coast. He was too anxious to relax. Writing to his former tutor Marcus Cornelius Fronto, he declared that he would not speak about his holiday. Fronto replied ironically: "What? Do I not know that you went to Alsium with the intention of devoting yourself to games, joking and complete leisure for four whole days?" He encouraged Marcus to rest, calling on the example of his predecessors (Pius had enjoyed exercise in the palaestra, fishing, and comedy), going so far as to write up a fable about the gods' division of the day between morning and evening—Marcus had apparently been spending most of his evenings on judicial matters instead of leisure. Marcus could not take Fronto's advice. "I have duties hanging over me that can hardly be begged off," he wrote back. Marcus put on Fronto's voice to chastise himself: "'Much good has my advice done you', you will say!" He had rested, and would rest often, but "—this devotion to duty! Who knows better than you how demanding it is!"

Fronto sent Marcus a selection of reading material, including Cicero's pro lege Manilia, in which the orator had argued in favor of Pompey taking supreme command in the Mithridatic War. It was an apt reference (Pompey's war had taken him to Armenia), and may have had some impact on the decision to send Lucius to the eastern front. "You will find in it many chapters aptly suited to your present counsels, concerning the choice of army commanders, the interests of allies, the protection of provinces, the discipline of the soldiers, the qualifications required for commanders in the field and elsewhere [...] (Note: The text breaks off here.)" To settle his unease over the course of the Parthian war, Fronto wrote Marcus a long and considered letter, full of historical references. In modern editions of Fronto's works, it is labeled De bello Parthico (On the Parthian War). There had been reverses in Rome's past, Fronto writes, at Allia, at Caudium, at Cannae, at Numantia, Cirta, and Carrhae; and under Trajan (against the Dacians and the Parthians), Hadrian (against the Jews and the Britons), and again under Pius; but, in the end, Romans had always prevailed over their enemies: "always and everywhere [Mars] has changed our troubles into successes and our terrors into triumphs".

== Lucius' dispatch and journey east, 162–163? ==
Over the winter of 161–62, as more bad news arrived—a rebellion was brewing in Syria—it was decided that Lucius should direct the Parthian war in person. He was stronger and healthier than Marcus, the argument went, more suited to military activity. Lucius' biographer suggests ulterior motives: to restrain Lucius' debaucheries, to make him thrifty, to reform his morals by the terror of war, to realize that he was an emperor. (Note: Birley believes there is some truth in these considerations.) Whatever the case, the senate gave its assent, and Lucius left. Marcus would remain in Rome; the city "demanded the presence of an emperor".

Titus Furius Victorinus, one of the two praetorian prefects, was sent with Lucius, as were a pair of senators, Marcus Pontius Laelianus Larcius Sabinus and Marcus Iallius Bassus, and a detachment of the Praetorian Guard. Victorinus had previously served as procurator of Galatia, giving him some experience with eastern affairs. (Note: Victorinus had also served in Britain, on the Danube, in Spain, as prefect of the Italian fleets, as prefect of Egypt, and in many posts in Rome itself.) Moreover, he was far more qualified than his praetorian partner, Sextus Cornelius Repentinus, who was said to owe his office to the influence of Pius' mistress Galeria Lysistrate. Repentius had the rank of a senator, but no real access to senatorial circles—his was merely a decorative title. Since a prefect had to accompany the Guard, Victorinus was the clear choice.

Laelianus had been governor of both Pannonias and governor of Syria in 153; hence he had first-hand knowledge of the eastern army and military strategy on the frontiers. He was made comes Augustorum ("companion of the emperors") for his service. Laelianus was, in the words of Fronto, "a serious man and an old-fashioned disciplinarian". Bassus had been governor of Lower Moesia, and was also made comes. Lucius selected his favorite freedmen, including Geminus, Agaclytus, Coedes, Eclectus, and Nicomedes, who gave up his duties as praefectus vehiculorum to run the commissariat of the expeditionary force. The fleet of Misenum was charged with transporting the emperor and general communications and transport.

Lucius left in the summer of 162 to take a ship from Brundisium; Marcus followed him as far as Capua. Lucius feasted himself in the country houses along his route, and hunted at Apulia. He fell ill at Canosa, probably afflicted with a mild stroke, and took to bed. Marcus made prayers to the gods for his safety in front of the senate, and hurried south to see him. Fronto was upset at the news, but was reassured when Lucius sent him a letter describing his treatment and recovery. In his reply, Fronto urged his pupil to moderate his desires, and recommended a few days of quiet bedrest. Lucius was better after three days' fasting and a bloodletting. It was probably only a mild stroke.

Verus continued eastward via Corinth and Athens, accompanied by musicians and singers as if in a royal progress. At Athens he stayed with Herodes Atticus, and joined the Eleusinian Mysteries. During sacrifice, a falling star was observed in the sky, shooting west to east. He stopped in Ephesus, where he is attested at the estate of the local aristocrat Publius Vedius Antoninus, and made an unexpected stopover at Erythrae, where an elegiac poem in the voice of the local sibyl alludes to his visit. The journey continued by ship through the Aegean and the southern coasts of Asia Minor, lingering in the famed pleasure resorts of Pamphylia and Cilicia, before arriving in Antioch. It is not known how long Verus' journey east took; he might not have arrived in Antioch until after 162. Statius Priscus, meanwhile, must have already arrived in Cappadocia; he would earn fame in 163 for successful generalship.

== Dissipation and logistics at Antioch, 162?–165 ==
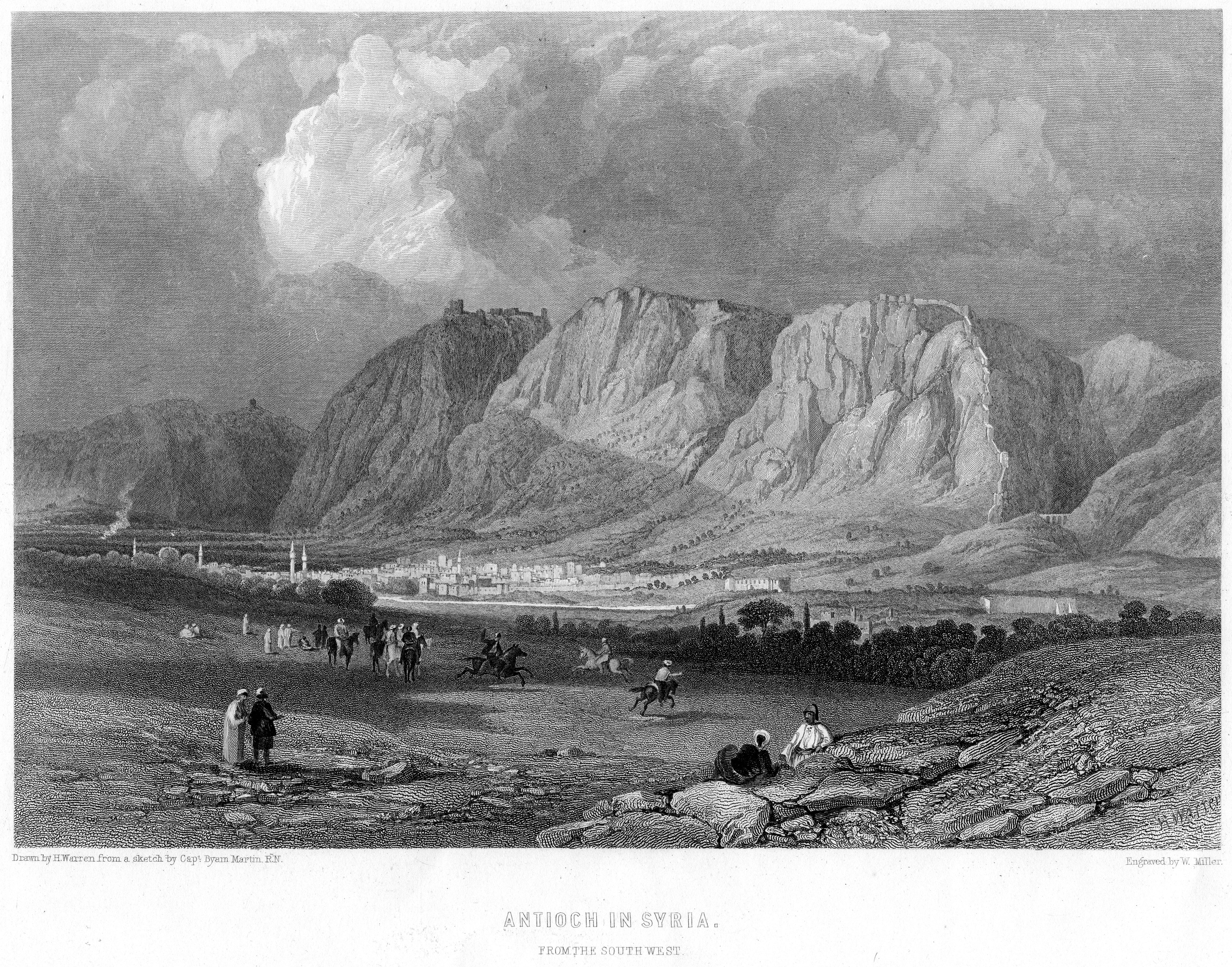
Antioch from the southwest (engraving by William Miller after a drawing by H. Warren from a sketch by Captain Byam Martin, R.N., 1866)

Lucius spent most of the campaign in Antioch, though he wintered at Laodicea and summered at Daphne, a resort just outside Antioch. He took up a mistress named Panthea, (Note: Or "Pantheia".) from Smyrna. The biographer calls her a "low-born girl-friend", but she is probably closer to Lucian's "woman of perfect beauty", more beautiful than any of Phidias and Praxiteles' statues. Polite, caring, humble, she sang to the lyre perfectly and spoke clear Ionic Greek, spiced with Attic wit. Panthea read Lucian's first draft, and criticized him for flattery. He had compared her to a goddess, which frightened her—she did not want to become the next Cassiopeia. She had power, too. She made Lucius shave his beard for her. The Syrians mocked him for this, as they did for much else.

Critics declaimed Lucius' luxurious lifestyle. He had taken to gambling, they said; he would "dice the whole night through". He enjoyed the company of actors. He made a special request for dispatches from Rome, to keep him updated on how his chariot teams were doing. He brought a golden statue of the Greens' horse Volucer around with him, as a token of his team spirit. Fronto defended his pupil against some of these claims: the Roman people needed Lucius' bread and circuses to keep them in check. (Note: Fronto called it "the corn-dole and public spectacles" (annona et spectaculis), preferring his own pompous rephrase to Juvenal's plain panem et circenses. (The notion was a commonplace, and Fronto was, in any case, unfamiliar with Juvenal; the author was out of style through the classicizing mania of the Second Sophistic, and would not become popular until the later 4th century.))

This, at least, is how the biographer has it. The whole section of the vita dealing with Lucius' debaucheries (HA Verus 4.4–6.6) is an insertion into a narrative otherwise entirely cribbed from an earlier source. Some few passages seem genuine; (Note: In the judgment of T.D. Barnes: 4.8, "He was very fond also of charioteers, favouring the 'Greens'."; 4.10, "He never needed much sleep, however; and his digestion was excellent."; perhaps 5.7, "After the banquet, moreover, they diced until dawn.".) others take and elaborate something from the original. (Note: In the judgment of T.D. Barnes: 4.8 ("He was very fond also of charioteers, favouring the 'Greens'.") and 10.9 ("Among other articles of extravagance he had a crystal goblet, named Volucer after that horse of which he had been very fond, that surpassed the capacity of any human draught.") are the seed for 6.2–6, "And finally, even at Rome, when he was present and seated with Marcus, he suffered many insults from the 'Blues,' because he had outrageously, as they maintained, taken sides against them. For he had a golden statue made of the 'Green' horse Volucer, and this he always carried around with him; indeed, he was wont to put raisins and nuts instead of barley in this horse's manger and to order him brought to him, in the House of Tiberius, covered with a blanket dyed with purple, and he built him a tomb, when he died, on the Vatican Hill. It was because of this horse that gold pieces and prizes first began to be demanded for horses, and in such honour was this horse held, that frequently a whole peck of gold pieces was demanded for him by the faction of the 'Greens'."; 10.8, "He was somewhat halting in speech, a reckless gambler, ever of an extravagant mode of life, and in many respects, save only that he was not cruel or given to acting, a second Nero.", for the comparison with other "bad emperors" at 4.6 ("...he so rivalled Caligula, Nero, and Vitellius in their vices..."), and, significantly, the excuse to use Suetonius.) The rest is by the biographer himself, relying on nothing better than his own imagination.

Lucius faced quite a task. Fronto described the scene in terms recalling Corbulo's arrival one hundred years before. The Syrian army had turned soft during the east's long peace. They spent more time at the city's open-air bars than in their quarters. Under Lucius, training was stepped up. Pontius Laelianus ordered that their saddles be stripped of their padding. Gambling and drinking were sternly policed. Fronto wrote that Lucius was on foot at the head of his army as often as on horseback. He personally inspected soldiers in the field and at camp, including the sick bay.

Lucius sent Fronto few messages at the beginning of the war. He sent Fronto a letter apologizing for his silence. He would not detail plans that could change within a day, he wrote. Moreover, there was little thus far to show for his work: "not even yet has anything been accomplished such as to make me wish to invite you to share in the joy". Lucius did not want Fronto to suffer the anxieties that had kept him up day and night. One reason for Lucius' reticence may have been the collapse of Parthian negotiations after the Roman conquest of Armenia. Lucius' presentation of terms was seen as cowardice. The Parthians were not in the mood for peace.

Lucius needed to make extensive imports into Antioch, so he opened a sailing route up the Orontes. Because the river breaks across a cliff before reaching the city, Lucius ordered that a new canal be dug. After the project was completed, the Orontes' old riverbed dried up, exposing massive bones—the bones of a giant. Pausanias says they were from a beast "more than eleven cubits" tall; Philostratus says that it was "thirty cubits" tall. The oracle at Claros declared that they were the bones of the river's spirit.

In the middle of the war, perhaps in autumn 163 or early 164, Lucius made a trip to Ephesus to be married to Marcus' daughter Lucilla. Lucilla's thirteenth birthday was in March 163; whatever the date of her marriage, she was not yet fifteen. Marcus had moved up the date: perhaps stories of Panthea had disturbed him. Lucilla was accompanied by her mother Faustina and Marcus Vettulenus Civica Barbarus, the half-brother of Lucius' father. Marcus may have planned to accompany them all the way to Smyrna (the biographer says he told the senate he would); this did not happen. Marcus only accompanied the group as far as Brundisium, where they boarded a ship for the east. Marcus returned to Rome immediately thereafter, and sent out special instructions to his proconsuls not to give the group any official reception. Lucilla would bear three of Lucius' children in the coming years. Lucilla became Lucilla Augusta.

== Counterattack and victory, 163–166 ==
The Legions I Minervia, commanded by M. Claudius Fronto and V Macedonica, commanded by P. Martius Verus, served under Marcus Statius Priscus in Armenia, achieving success during the campaign season of 163, culminating with the capture of the Armenian capital Artaxata. At the end of the year, Verus took the title Armeniacus, despite having never seen combat; Marcus declined to accept the title until the following year. When Lucius was hailed as imperator again, however, Marcus did not hesitate to take the title Imperator II with him. The army of Syria was reinforced by II Adiutrix and Danubian legions under X Gemina's legate Geminius Marcianus.

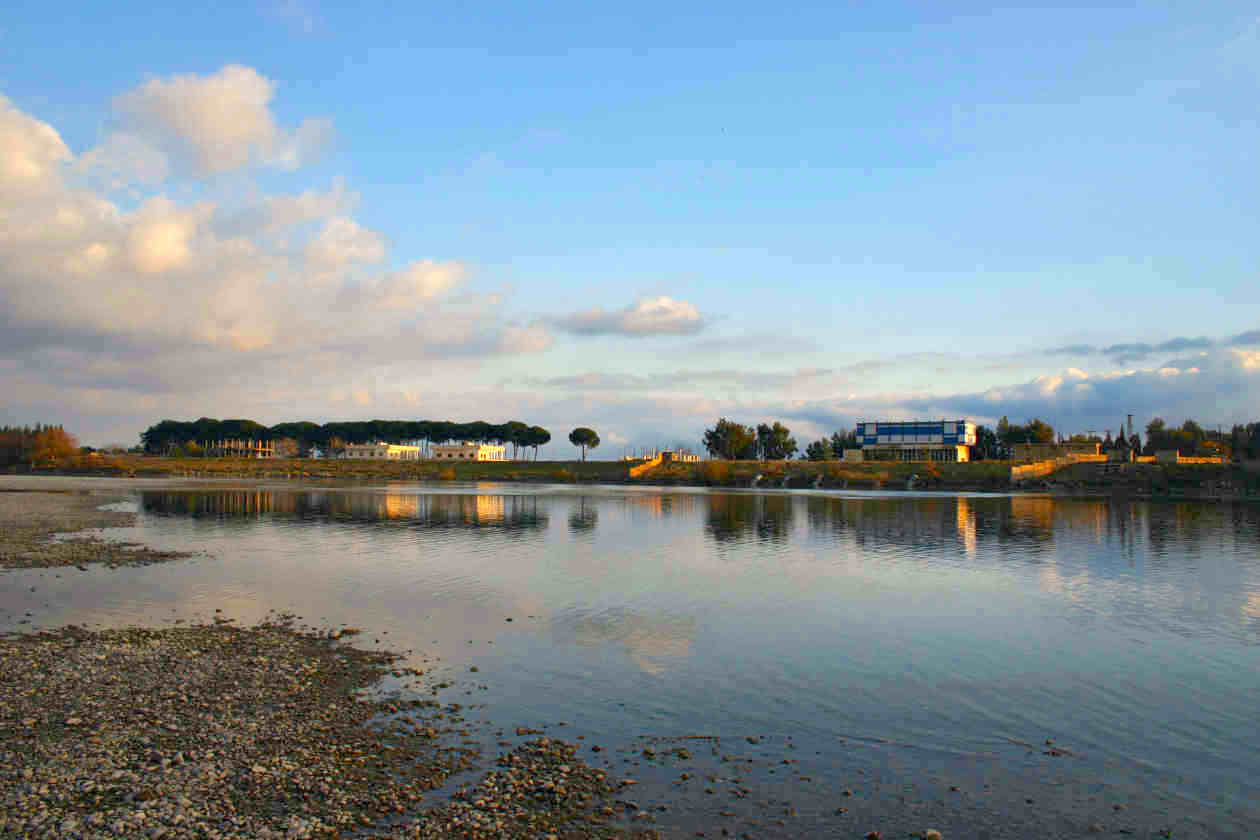
The Euphrates river near Raqqa, Syria

Occupied Armenia was reconstructed on Roman terms. In 164, a new capital, Kaine Polis ("New City" in Greek), replaced Artaxata. On Birley's reckoning, it was thirty miles closer to the Roman border. Detachments from Cappadocian legions are attested at Echmiadzin, beneath the southern face of Mount Ararat, 400 km east of Satala. It would have meant a march of twenty days or more, through mountainous terrain, from the Roman border; a "remarkable example of imperialism", in the words of Fergus Millar. A new king was installed: a Roman senator of consular rank and Arsacid descent, C. Iulius Sohaemus. He may not even have been crowned in Armenia; the ceremony may have taken place in Antioch, or even Ephesus. Sohaemus was hailed on the imperial coinage of 164 under the legend Rex armeniis Datus: Verus sat on a throne with his staff while Sohamenus stood before him, saluting the emperor.

In 163, while Statius Priscus was occupied in Armenia, the Parthians intervened in Osroene, a Roman client in upper Mesopotamia, just east of Syria, with its capital at Edessa. They deposed the country's leader, Mannus, and replaced him with their own nominee, who would remain in office until 165. (The Edessene coinage record actually begins at this point, with issues showing Vologases IV on the obverse and "Wael the king" (Syriac: W'L MLK') on the reverse.) In response, Roman forces were moved downstream, to cross the Euphrates at a more southerly point. On the evidence of Lucian, the Parthians still held the southern, Roman bank of the Euphrates (in Syria) as late as 163 (he refers to a battle at Sura, which is on the southern side of the river). Before the end of the year, however, Roman forces had moved north to occupy Dausara and Nicephorium on the northern, Parthian bank. (Note: The letter noting the victories (Ad Verum Imperator 2.1) dates to 164 (Fronto makes a reference to Marcus' delay in taking the Armeniacus; since he took the title in 164, the letter can be no earlier than that date.), but the battles themselves date to 163.) Soon after the conquest of the north bank of the Euphrates, other Roman forces moved on Osroene from Armenia, taking Anthemusia, a town south-west of Edessa. There was little movement in 164; most of the year was spent on preparations for a renewed assault on Parthian territory.

In 165, Roman forces, perhaps led by Martius Verus and the V Macedonica, moved on Mesopotamia. Edessa was re-occupied, Mannus re-installed. His coinage resumed, too: 'Ma'nu the king' (Syriac: M'NW MLK') or Antonine dynasts on the obverse, and 'King Mannos, friend of the Romans' (Greek: Basileus Mannos Philorōmaios) on the reverse. The Parthians retreated to Nisibis, but this too was besieged and captured. The Parthian army dispersed in the Tigris; their general Chosrhoes swam down the river and made his hideout in a cave. A second force, under Avidius Cassius and the III Gallica, moved down the Euphrates, and fought a major battle at Dura-Europos. In this battle, a certain Priscus, as retold by Lucian, reports that the Romans "slaughtered 70,236 of the Enemy" while only suffering 2 killed and 7 wounded, however Lucian himself denies this claim.

By the end of 165, Cassius' army had reached the twin metropolises of Mesopotamia: Seleucia on the right bank of the Tigris and Ctesiphon on the left. Ctesiphon was taken and its royal palace set to flame. The citizens of Seleucia, still largely Greek (the city had been commissioned and settled as a capital of the Seleucid Empire, one of Alexander the Great's successor kingdoms), opened its gates to the invaders. The city got sacked nonetheless, leaving a black mark on Lucius' reputation. Excuses were sought, or invented: the official version (promulgated, according to the Historia Augusta, by Asinius Quadratus) had it that the Seleuceni broke faith first. Whatever the case, the sacking marks a particularly destructive chapter in Seleucia's long decline. (Note: Birley states that the siege marked the end of the city's history; Matthews denies that the end of Seleucia can be tied to any one event, and points to other factors in the city's decline, like the rise of Ctesiphon, the shifting course of the Tigris, and a decline in royal patronage.) During the sacking, Roman troops stole the statue of Apollo Comaeus from its temple and brought it back to Rome, where it was installed at the temple of the Palatine Apollo. This blasphemy may have been on Marcus' mind when he called a lectisternium, a great meal offered to the gods, at the beginning of the Marcomannic Wars (c. 167) to ward off the evils then being visited on the state.

Cassius' army, although suffering from a shortage of supplies and the effects of a plague, contracted in Seleucia, made it back to Roman territory safely. Iunius Maximus, a young tribunus laticlavius serving in III Gallica under Cassius, took the news of the victory to Rome. Maximus received a generous cash bounty (dona) for bringing the good news, and immediate promotion to the quaestorship. Lucius took the title Parthicus Maximus, and he and Marcus were hailed as imperatores again, earning the title Imp. III. Cassius' army returned to the field in 166, crossing over the Tigris into Media. Lucius took the title Medicus, and the emperors were again hailed as imperatores, becoming Imp. IV in imperial titulature. Marcus too took the Parthicus Maximus now, after another tactful delay.

== Conclusion of the war, mid-160s–167 ==
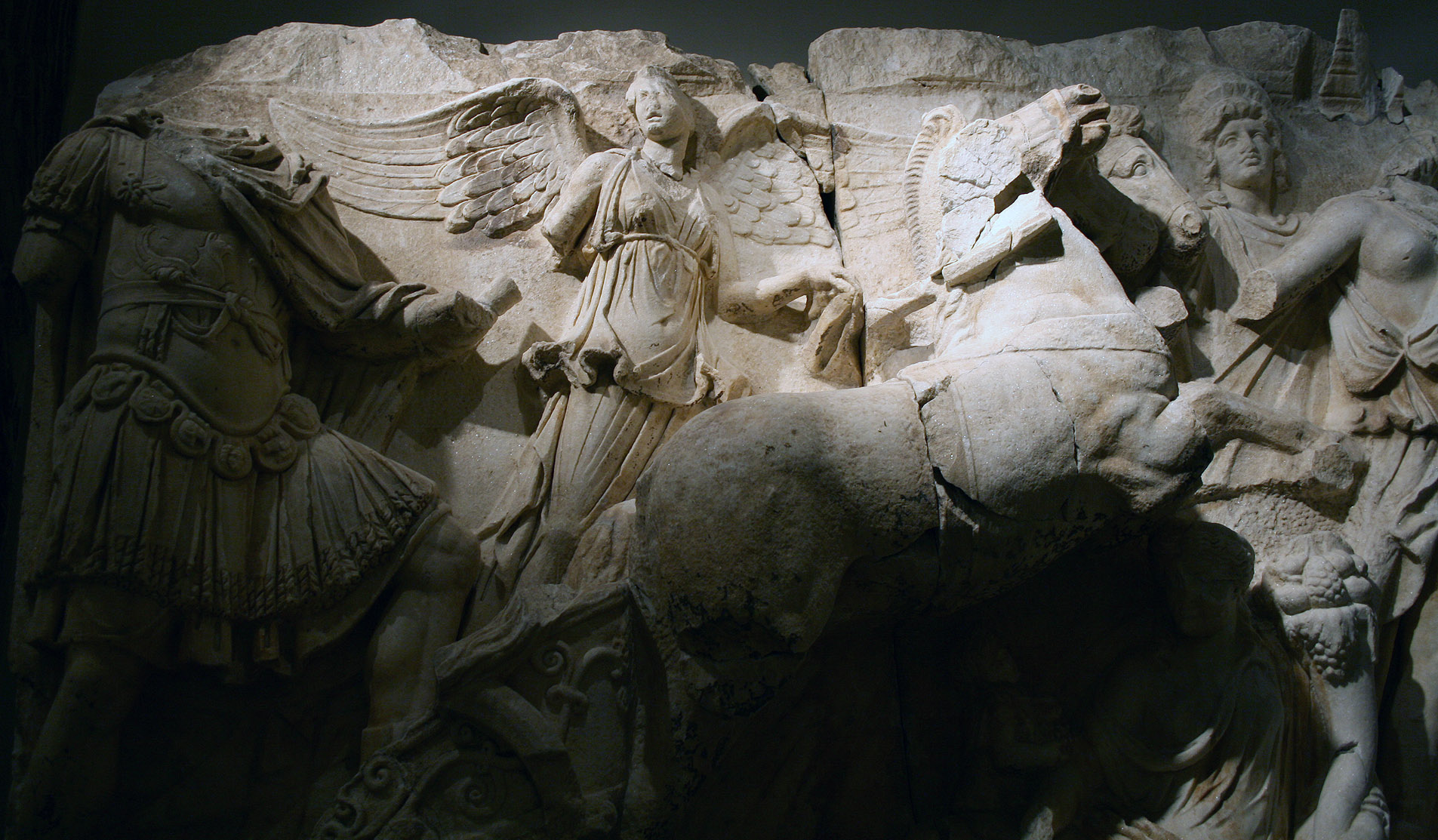
Lucius Verus' apotheosis from Ephesus (the so-called Parthian Monument; today in Ephesos Museum in Wien).

Most of the credit for the war's success must be ascribed to subordinate generals. The forces that advanced on Osroene were led by M. Claudius Fronto, an Asian provincial of Greek descent who had led I Minervia in Armenia under Priscus. He was probably the first senator in his family. Fronto was consul for 165, probably in honor of the capture of Edessa. Claudius Fronto returned to Italy for his consulship; the governor of Syria, Gnaeus Julius Verus, also returned. Publius Martius Verus had led V Macedonica to the front, and also served under Priscus. Martius Verus was a westerner, whose patria was perhaps Tolosa in Gallia Narbonensis. The most prominent general, however, was C. Avidius Cassius, commander of III Gallica, one of the Syrian legions. Cassius was a young senator, the son of Gaius Avidius Heliodorus, a noted orator who was augustal prefect of Egypt from 137 to 142 AD under Hadrian, and wife Julia Cassia Alexandra. Cassius also, with no small sense of self-worth, claimed descent from the Seleucid kings and the Julio-Claudians through his mother Julia Cassia Alexandra, who descended (via Junia Lepida) from Julia, daughter and only child of Augustus. Cassius and Martius Verus, still probably in their mid-thirties, took the consulships for 166. After their consulships, they were made governors: Cassius, of Syria; Martius Verus, of Cappadocia.

On the return from the campaign, Lucius was awarded with a triumph; the parade was unusual because it included the two emperors, their sons and unmarried daughters as a big family celebration. Marcus Aurelius' two sons, Commodus five years old and Marcus Annius Verus of three, were elevated to the status of Caesar for the occasion.

A statue base survives in Sardis to commemorate Lucius' victory (the emperor had presumably visited the city on his return to Rome). The wealthy sophist T. Flavius Damianus also hosted the emperor and his army during their return trip.

Nisibis on the upper Euphrates remained in Roman hands for several decades after the end of the war. By the mid-3rd century, when it was frequently contested by and exchanged between Persia and Rome, it had taken on the appearances of a typical Roman garrison town.

== Citations ==
All citations to the Historia Augusta are to individual biographies, and are marked with a "HA". Citations to the works of Fronto are cross-referenced to C.R. Haines' Loeb edition.
