= Marcus Statius Priscus =

2nd century Roman senator, general and consul

Marcus Statius Priscus Licinius Italicus (M. Statius M. f. Cl. Priscus Licinius Italicus) (Note: The name M. Statius M. f. Cl. Priscus Licinius Italicus says he is the son of a Marcus as M. f.; Cl. refers to the tribe he belonged to, which in this case was "Claudia". See Roman naming conventions) was a Roman senator and general active during the reigns of Hadrian, Antoninus Pius, and Marcus Aurelius. Contemporary sources refer to him as Marcus Statius Priscus or simply Statius Priscus. He was consul for the year 159 as the colleague of Plautius Quintillus; Priscus was one of only two homines novi to attain the ordinary consul in the reigns of Antoninus Pius and Marcus Aurelius.

== Life ==
The cursus honorum of Statius Priscus is preserved in an inscription found in Rome. His career began as an equestrian officer, first as praefectus or commander of the Cohors IV Lingonum, an auxilia nominally one thousand men in strength. Next he was a military tribune in three different legions: Legio III Gallica, Legio X Gemina, and Legio I Adiutrix. It was at this time he received dona militaria, or decorations while fighting in the Bar Kokhba revolt of 132–136; Anthony Birley believes Priscus was commissioned with the III Gallica when he earned this distinction. His third step in his equestrian career was as praefectus with an ala stationed in Cappadocia. He then advanced from military appointments, and served as procurator of the vicesima hereditatium in Gallia Narbonensis and Aquitania.

At this point Statius Priscus entered the Senate. No details are provided, but we can surmise a few details. One is that this happened under emperor Antoninus Pius. Another was that he owed his advance to the patronage of Quintus Lollius Urbicus, of whom Birley writes, "his influence in the 140s was no doubt considerable." More importantly, instead of being adlected into the Senate at praetorian or even quaestorian rank, he was forced to proceed through the traditional Republican magistracies of quaestor, plebeian tribune, and peregrine praetor. "This reflects the conservatism of the reign of Antoninus Pius," Birley states. "Priscus must have been well over thirty when he entered the senate as a quaestor, and well over fifty when he finally became consul." It was at this point he was admitted into the priesthood of the sacerdoti Titali. Once praetor, Priscus was commissioned legatus legionis or commander of Legio XIV Gemina; Birley suggests this was while Claudius Maximus, a friend of heir apparent Marcus Aurelius governed Pannonia Superior.

Statius Priscus was appointed governor of Dacia between 157 and 158, as attested by a number of surviving military diplomas. Birley notes that Priscus had distinguished himself in Dacia: "he undoubtedly had some military success in Dacia, as a number of inscriptions from that province reveal." His success was recognized upon his return to Rome, with his ordinary consulship. The following year he was made curator alvei Tiberis et cloacarum urbis, the official responsible for maintaining the channels of the Tiber River, as well as the sewers of Rome, but his tenure was brief. Priscus is attested as governor of Moesia Superior by another military diploma dated to February 161, as well as a dedication he erected after the death of Antoninus Pius to the new emperors Marcus Aurelius and Lucius Verus at Viminacium. The northern frontier of Roman Britain came under threat that required an experienced general, so the new emperors reassigned him there later that year.

He had been in Britain only a few months when a more serious threat presented itself—the war with Parthia. In 162 Vologases IV defeated Marcus Sedatius Severianus in Armenia; Roman Syria was threatened. Priscus was made governor of Cappadocia. His forces, made up of Eastern auxiliaries and several legions transferred from the Rhine and the Danube, quickly crushed the Parthians and destroyed the town of Artaxata. Priscus then installed Sohaemus, who was under the protection of Rome, on the Armenian throne, and rebuilt the city of Valarshapat. The satirist Lucian records how one contemporary historian described "how Priscus the general merely shouted out and 27 of the enemy dropped dead." Birley comments, "It is foolhardy to try to squeeze some truth out of evidence of this kind, but one might perhaps suppose, at least, that Priscus was a man with an aggressive and boisterous style of leadership."

According to Cassius Dio, when Avidius Cassius (the governor of Egypt and Syria) was declared emperor by his legions, it was Priscus who informed Emperor Aurelius. Cassius declared himself emperor at the behest of Aurelius' wife who convinced Cassius and his legions that the emperor had died. Aurelius quickly defeated Cassius and installed Priscus as governor of Syria.

== Family ==
Although no wife is attested for Priscus, Giuseppe Camodeca published the inscription of a statue honoring one Fufidia Clementiana, a clarissima puella, who is described as the granddaughter of Priscus. This implies he had a daughter, who married Lucius Fufidius Pollio, ordinary consul in 166. There is also a Marcus Statius Longinus, governor of Moesia Inferior under the emperor Macrinus, who is possibly Statius Priscus' grandson. If Longinus is his grandson, the existence of a son follows.

== Notes ==
Political offices
Preceded by Quintus Pomponius Musa, and Lucius Cassius Juvenalis	Consul of the Roman Empire; 159 with Plautius Quintillus	Succeeded by Marcus Pisibanius Lepidus, and Lucius Matuccius Fuscinus
Preceded by Longinus	Roman governors of Britain; 161- later in the 160s	Succeeded by Uncertain, then Sextus Calpurnius Agricola
