= Publius Martius Verus =

2nd century Roman senator, consul and general

Publius Martius Verus was a Roman senator and general. He was twice consul. Verus played a major role in the suppression of the revolt of Avidius Cassius by remaining loyal to the emperor Marcus Aurelius.

== Life ==
Verus came from the Roman colony of Tolosa in Gallia Narbonensis. His first recorded post was as legatus legionis or commander of Legio V Macedonica in 162, during the Roman–Parthian War. Upon the resolution of that conflict, Verus was appointed suffect consul in 166 with Marcus Vibius Liberalis. That same year he was made governor of Roman Cappadocia, which post he held upon the revolt of Avidius Cassius.

Following the defeat and death of Avidius Cassius, in 175 Verus was replaced as governor of Cappadocia by Gaius Arrius Antoninus, and made governor of Avidius Cassius' former province, Syria, apparently to aid in re-establishing Imperial control of that province. Verus was also rewarded for his loyalty with being appointed consul ordinarius in 179, with the co-emperor Commodus.

His life after the ordinary consulship is not recorded.

== Family ==
Verus married a Sergia Saturnina, a native of Ostia. They are known to have had a son, Publius Martius Sergius Saturninus, ordinary consul in 198.

Political offices
Preceded by Quintus Servilius Pudens, and Lucius Fufidius Pollio as ordinary consuls	Suffect consul of the Roman Empire; 166 with Marcus Vibius Liberalis	Succeeded by Lucius Verus III, and Marcus Ummidius Quadratus Annianus as ordinary consuls
Preceded by Servius Cornelius Scipio Salvidienus Orfitus, and Decimus Velius Rufus as ordinary consuls	Ordinary consul of the Roman Empire; 179 with Imp. Caesar Lucius Aurelius Commodus Augustus II	Succeeded by Titus Flavius Claudianus, and Lucius Aemilius Iuncus as suffect consuls
