= Publius Julius Geminius Marcianus =

2nd century Roman senator, consul and general

Publius Julius Geminius Marcianus was a Roman senator and general. He participated in the Roman–Parthian War of 161–166. Marcianus was appointed suffect consul in either 165 or 166.

== Life ==
Marcianus was a native of Cirta in North Africa. Debrowa considers that he "was probably the first representative of his family in the Roman senate", making him a novus homo. Professor Edward Champlin included him as a member of "a Cirtan community at Rome" he infers existed there, whose members included: Quintus Lollius Urbicus, consul in either 135 or 136; Gaius Arrius Antoninus, consul c. 170; and the rhetorician Fronto. Champlin speculates Marcianus may be the "Marcianus noster" who assisted Fronto in his prosecution of Herodes Atticus.

The beginning of his senatorial career was not impressive. As a member of the vigintiviri, a preliminary and required first step toward gaining entry into the Roman Senate, Marcianus was allocated to the tresviri capitalis, which was not a prestigious office. Following this he held the typical series of offices: a hitch as military tribune in Legio IV Scythica, then another hitch as military tribune in Legio X Fretensis. He returned to Rome to serve as quaestor, then plebeian tribune, praetor, legate to the proconsul of Africa, and legate or commander of Legio X Gemina.

The outbreak of the Roman–Parthian War of 161–166 provided Marcianus with the opportunity to show his abilities. He was commissioned as commander of a collection of vexillations from Pannonia that was sent to the Parthian front, and showed he was successful as legate of Legio X Gemina. He was promoted to govern the imperial province of Roman Arabia, then returned to be appointed consul.

Shortly after his consulship, Marcianus was appointed proconsular governor of Macedonia. This is unusual, since Macedonia was considered a province whose administration was allocated to senators before they achieved the consulship. Dabrowa explains this oddity "because of the danger of Marcomanni and Germans attacking the province was really serious." The last office Marcianus is known to have held is the proconsular governorship of Asia around 182.
