= Sextus Cornelius Repentinus (praetorian prefect) =

2nd century Roman official and praetorian prefect

Sextus Cornelius Repentinus was a Roman eques who held a number of senior positions during the reigns of Emperors Antoninus Pius and Marcus Aurelius.

The course of his career can be followed in an inscription reconstructed by Giuseppe Camodeca and conserved at Museo Nazionale Romano in Rome. The earliest position Repentinus is known to have held is the office of advocatus fisci, or tax collector. He was next promoted to ab commentariis, then to ab epistulis, offices in the imperial secretariat.

Then in the year 160, when Gaius Tattius Maximus the praetorian prefect died, Repentinus and Titus Furius Victorinus were promoted to succeed him. According to the Historia Augusta, Repentinus received this appointment through the intervention of Galeria Lysistrate, the freedwoman of Annia Faustina, the wife of Antoninus Pius. A tombstone from Rome mentioning Repentinus attests that he was still Praetorian prefect 28 February 167.

A surviving letter of the orator Marcus Cornelius Fronto is addressed to Repentinus; that Fronto addresses him with a nickname -- "brother Contuccius" -- makes it very likely the two were friends.

It is believed that Cornelius Repentinus, the son-in-law of emperor Didius Julianus, was his son.
