= Alsium =

Ancient city in Etruria, Italy

Coordinates: 41°56′N 12°06′E

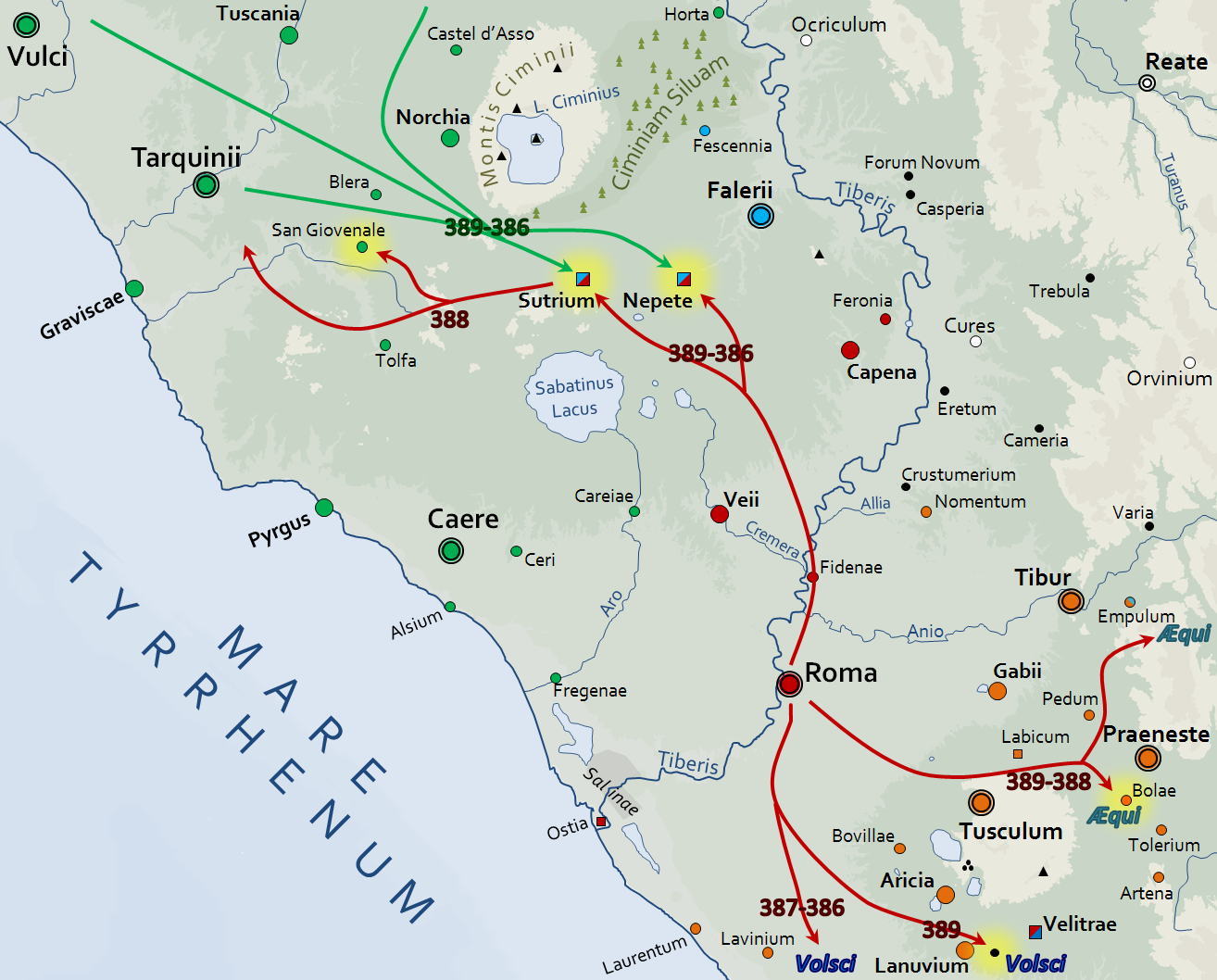
Map of Etruria and operations in the wars of 389-386 BC

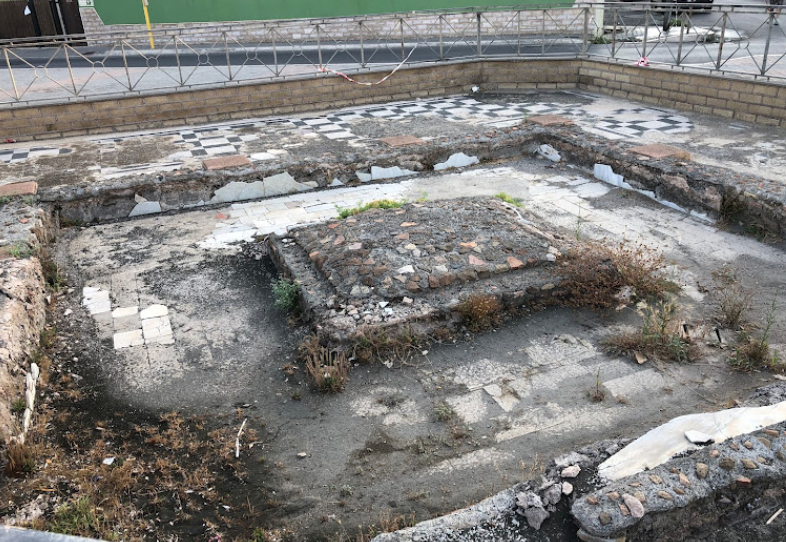
Villa of "Pompey"

Alsium (modern: Palo) was an ancient city on the coast of Etruria, between Pyrgi and Fregenae, on the Via Aurelia, by which it is about 35 km from Rome near the modern Ladispoli. It was one of the oldest towns of Etruria, but did not appear in history until the Roman colonisation of 247 BC. It was never of great importance, except as a resort of wealthy Romans, many of whom (including Pompey and the Antonine emperors) had villas there.

== History ==
It is mentioned by Dionysius among the cities which were founded by the Pelasgians in connection with the aborigines, and afterwards wrested from them by the Tyrrhenians (Etruscans). But no mention of it occurs in history as an Etruscan city, or during the wars of that people with Rome. In 247 BC a Roman colonia maritima was established there and which exempted them from all military service, which was, however, overruled during the exigencies of the Second Punic War. It is mentioned by Strabo, Pliny, and Ptolemy, and it still retained its colonial rank (from an inscription of the time of Caracalla), and corresponding municipal organisation.

It became a favourite resort with wealthy Romans as a place of retirement and pleasure; and Pompey the Great had a villa there, and Julius Caesar also, where he landed on his return from Africa, and at which all the nobles of Rome hastened to greet him. Another is mentioned as belonging to Lucius Verginius Rufus, the guardian of Pliny, and emperor Marcus Aurelius had a villa there, to which several of his epistles are addressed. At a later period the town itself had fallen into utter decay, but the site was still occupied by villas, as well as that of the neighbouring Pyrgi.

== The site ==
The 17th-century fort and mole at Palo Laziale use many ancient materials, probably from the site of Alsium.

Northeast of Palo is a row of large mounds called I Monteroni, which belong to tombs of the Etruscan cemetery. Over more than a mile of the shore to the east of Palo Laziale is occupied by considerable remains of ancient villas of the most magnificent scale and style of construction one of which, just east of Palo, occupies an area of some 400 by 250 yards (370 by 230 m).
