= Marcus Cornelius Fronto =

2nd century AD Roman rhetorician and advocate

Marcus Cornelius Fronto (c. 100 – late 160s AD), best known as Fronto, was a Roman grammarian, rhetorician, and advocate. Of Berber origin, he was born at Cirta (modern-day Constantine, Algeria) in Numidia. He was suffect consul for the nundinium of July–August 142 with Gaius Laberius Priscus as his colleague. Emperor Antoninus Pius appointed him tutor to his adopted sons, the future emperors Marcus Aurelius and Lucius Verus.

== Life ==
Fronto was born a Roman citizen in the year 100 in the Numidian capital, Cirta. He described himself as a Libyan of the nomadic Libyans. He was taught as a child by the Greek paedagogus Aridelus.

Later, he continued his education at Rome with the philosopher Athenodotus and the orator Dionysius. He soon gained such renown as an advocate and orator as to be reckoned inferior only to Cicero. He amassed a large fortune, erected magnificent buildings, and purchased the famous gardens of Maecenas.

In 142 he was consul for two months (August and September) but declined the proconsulship of Asia on the grounds of ill-health. His latter years were embittered by the loss of all his children except one daughter. His talents as an orator and rhetorician were greatly admired by his contemporaries, a number of whom were later regarded as forming a school called Frontoniani after him; his object in his teaching was to inculcate the exact use of the Latin language in place of the artificialities of such 1st-century authors as Seneca the Younger and to encourage the use of "unlooked-for and unexpected words", to be found by diligent reading of pre-Ciceronian authors. He found fault with Cicero for inattention to that refinement, though admiring his letters without reserve. He may well have died in the late 160s as a result of the Antonine Plague that followed the Parthian War, though conclusive proof is lacking. C.R. Haines asserts he died in 166 or 167.

== Surviving works ==
Until 1815, the only extant works ascribed (erroneously) to Fronto were two grammatical treatises, De nominum verborumque differentiis and Exempla elocutionum (the latter being really by Arusianus Messius). In that year, Angelo Mai discovered in the Ambrosian library at Milan a palimpsest manuscript, on which had been originally written some of Fronto's letters to his imperial pupils and their replies; four years later Mai found several more sheets from this manuscript in the Vatican. These palimpsests had originally belonged to the famous convent of St Columbanus at Bobbio and had been written over by the monks with the acts of the First Council of Chalcedon.

The letters from the Ambrosian palimpsest, along with the other fragments, were published at Rome in 1815. The Vatican texts were added in 1823, as was the end of his Gratiarum actio pro Carthaginiensibus from another Vatican manuscript. It was not until 1956 that Bernhard Bischoff identified a third manuscript (consisting of a single leaf) that contained fragments of Fronto's correspondence with Verus which overlapped the Milan palimpsest; however, the actual manuscript had been first published in 1750 by Dom Tassin, who conjectured that it might have been the work of Fronto.

These fragments disappointed Romantic scholars as not matching the writer's great reputation, partly because Fronto's teachings, with their emphasis on studying ancient writers in search of striking words, were not in accordance with current fashion (Italy, where not only Mai but Leopardi enthused over them, was an exception), partly because they gave no support to the assumption that Fronto had been a wise counsellor to Marcus Aurelius (indeed, they contain no trace of political advice), and partly because his frequent complaints about ill health, especially those collected in book 5 of Ad M. Caesarem, aroused more annoyance than compassion. These adverse judgements were reversed once Fronto was read for what he was rather than what he was not, as already in the sympathetic treatment by Dorothy Brock, Studies in Fronto and his Age (Cambridge: Cambridge University Press, 1911).

The bulk of the letters consist of correspondence with Antoninus Pius, Marcus Aurelius and Lucius Verus, in which the character of Fronto's pupils appears in a very favourable light, especially in the affection they both seem to have retained for their old master. There are also letters to friends, chiefly letters of recommendation, but including one (Ad amicos 1. 19) in which an out-of-sorts Fronto (ego epistulas invitissime scribo, "I hate writing letters") complains of Aulus Gellius' attempts to procure copies of his writings for publication. (Fronto appears in five chapters of the Noctes Atticae, though expressing tastes that sometime seem closer to Gellius' own than to those evinced in the letters.) The collection also contains treatises on eloquence, some historical fragments, and literary trifles on such subjects as the praise of smoke and dust, of negligence, and a dissertation on Arion. In addition, a fragment of a speech is preserved by Minucius Felix (Octavius 9. 6–7) in which Fronto accuses the Christians of incestuous orgies.

Marcus Aurelius, in his Meditations, says nothing of Fronto's rhetorical teaching; nor, although writing in Greek, does he so much as mention his teacher of Greek rhetoric and longtime friend Herodes Atticus. He does, however, credit Fronto with teaching him about the vices of tyranny and the lack of affection in the Roman upper class (1.11); since the former were commonplaces, there may be a concealed reference to life under Hadrian, whom Fronto retrospectively claims to have feared rather than loved, but the latter is borne out by the master's remark that there is no Latin equivalent for the Greek philóstorgos, meaning "affectionate". The letters between Aurelius and Fronto, which reveal the intimate nature of their relationship, are the only love letters to survive from antiquity.

The editio princeps was by Mai, as described above; the standard edition is the Teubner text by M. van den Hout (Leipzig, 1988). The Loeb Classical Library printed an edition of Fronto's correspondence with a facing English translation by C. R. Haines in two volumes (1919–1920). Van den Hout also published a full-scale commentary in English (Leiden, 1999).

Political offices
Preceded by Lucius Granius Castus, and Tiberius Junius Julianus as suffect consuls	Suffect consul of the Roman Empire; 142 with Gaius Laberius Priscus	Succeeded by Lucius Tusidius Campester, and Quintus Cornelius Senecio Annianus as suffect consuls
