= Galeria Lysistrate =

Concubine of Roman Emperor Antoninus Pius

Galeria Lysistrate or Lysistrata (2nd-century) was the concubina of the Roman emperor Antoninus Pius.

She was originally the slave of Pius's wife, Faustina the Elder and later manumitted. She became the acknowledged companion of Antoninus Pius after the death of Faustina in 138. Emperors often refrained from taking a second wife so as not to complicate issues of inheritance but committed to monogamous concubinage with a woman of markedly lower social status as an alternative to marriage. Lysistrata reportedly had a great deal of influence during the later reign of Pius.

== See also ==
- Claudia Acte
- Antonia Caenis
- Marcia (mistress of Commodus)
