= Marcomannic Wars =

166–180 AD series of Roman wars with Danubian tribes

- Part of the Roman–Germanic Wars
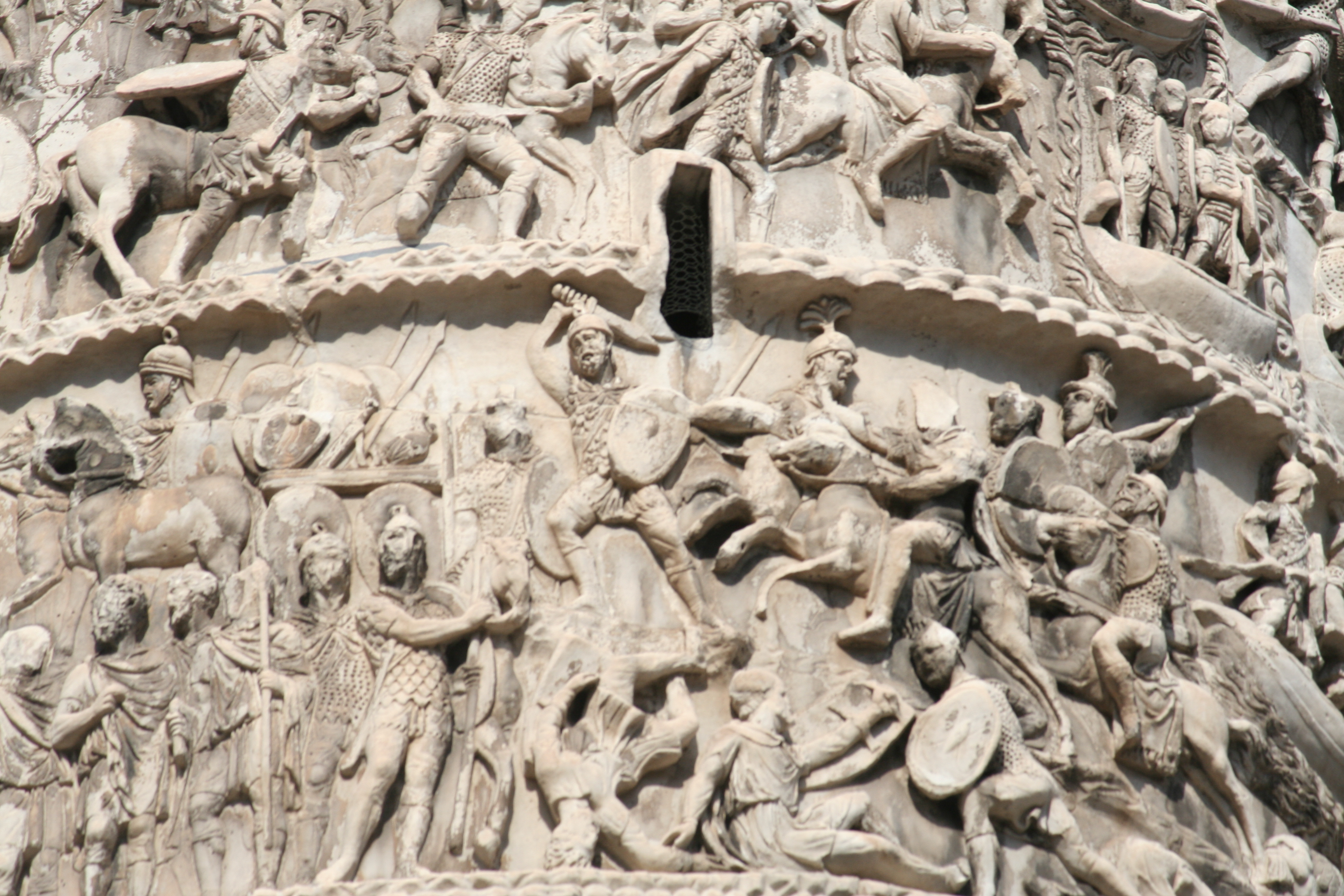
- Detail of a relief scene on the Column of Marcus Aurelius (in Rome, Italy), depicting a battle of the Marcomannic Wars, late 2nd century AD
Date	AD 166–180 (14 years)
Location	Course of the Danube, the northeastern European border of the Roman Empire
Result	Roman victory
Territorial changes	Status quo ante bellum: Roman plans to annex Sarmatia (Hungarian Plain) and Marcomannia (Moravia, Slovakia, and Bavaria north of Danube) abandoned

Belligerents
Roman Empire	Principal Belligerents: Marcomanni; Quadi; Iazyges; Naristi; Chatti; Chauci; Langobardi; Hermunduri; Suebi; Buri; Cotini; Vandals (Hasdingi, Lacringi, and Victohali); Roxolani; Bastarnae; Costoboci

Commanders and leaders
Imperial family: Marcus Aurelius; Lucius Verus # Tiberius Claudius Pompeianus; Commodus Praetorian prefects: Titus Furius Victorinus; Marcus Bassaeus Rufus; Marcus Macrinius Vindex †; Publius Tarrutenius Paternus Field marshals (legati): Publius Helvius Pertinax; Marcus Claudius Fronto †; Marcus Didius Julianus; Gaius Pescennius Niger; Decimus Clodius Albinus; M. Valerius Maximianus; Lucius Gallus Julianus; Gaius Vettius Sabinianus; Titus Vitrasius Pollio	Marcomanni: Ballomar Quadi: Ariogaesus Iazyges: Banadaspus; Zanticus Naristi: Valao

Units involved
Full list	Unknown

Strength
13 legions; 2 vexillationes; Danubian fleet; 58 auxiliary cohorts	977,000 (Note: Justin Martyr, at The Apostolic Fathers with Justin Martyr and Irenaeus, Letter from Marcus Aurelius to the Senate (document handed down from the 4th century).)

Casualties and losses
Unknown	Unknown

The Marcomannic Wars (Latin: bellum Germanicum et Sarmaticum, lit. 'German and Sarmatian war' (Note: Historian Péter Kovács spells out the various Latin derivatives for each of the Marcomannic Wars.)) were a series of wars lasting from about CE 166 until 180. These wars pitted the Roman Empire against principally the Germanic Marcomanni and Quadi and the Sarmatian Iazyges; there were related conflicts with several other Germanic, Sarmatian, and Gothic peoples along both sides of the whole length of the Roman Empire's northeastern European border, the river Danube.

The struggle against the Germans and Sarmatians occupied the major part of the reign of Roman emperor Marcus Aurelius, and it was during his campaigns against them that he started writing his philosophical work Meditations. (Note: Marcus Aurelius mentions these peoples in Book 1, annotating them with the note "Among the Quadi at the Granua".)

== Background ==
Secure for many years following his ascension to power, the Roman Emperor Antoninus Pius never left Italy; neither did he embark on substantial conquests, all the while allowing his provincial legates to command his legions entirely. Historian Adrian Goldsworthy posits that Pius's reluctance to take aggressive military action throughout his reign may have contributed to Parthian territorial ambitions. The resulting war between Parthia and Rome lasted from 161 to 166 AD (under the joint rule of Marcus Aurelius and Lucius Verus) and, although it ended successfully, its unforeseen consequences for the Empire were great. The returning troops brought with them a plague (the so-called Antonine Plague), which would eventually kill an estimated 7 to 8 million people, severely weakening the Empire. Despite the consequences of the plague, historian Kyle Harper contends that the event should not be treated as a fatal blow to the Empire. Instead, Rome's resilience was demonstrated since the Empire remained intact and Roman birth rates in the decade following the plague subsequently increased.

At the same time, in Central Europe during the second-century AD, the first movements of the Great Migrations were occurring, as the Goths began moving south-east from their ancestral lands at the mouth of River Vistula (see Wielbark culture), putting pressure on the Germanic tribes from the north and east. As a result, Germanic tribes and other nomadic peoples launched raids south and west across Rome's northern border, particularly into Gaul and across the Danube. Whether this sudden influx of peoples with which Marcus Aurelius had to contend was the result of climate change or overpopulation remains unknown. Theories exist that the various Germanic tribes along the periphery of the Empire may have conspired to test Roman resolve as part of an attempt to bring to possible fruition Arminius's dream of a future united Germanic empire.

Up until these subsequent wars, the Marcomanni and Quadi generally enjoyed amicable relations and access to the Empire's wares—archaeological evidence of Roman household goods and practices illustrate such contact. As with almost all areas within the Empire's reach, the Romans aimed for a combination of military–territorial dominance, while at the same time engaging in mutually beneficial commerce. However, the Marcomanni did not want to submit to Roman territorial dominance or be annexed; instead, they sought "incorporation into the Roman Empire" with favorable economic terms—something Marcus was not willing to tolerate since it went against his policy of dividing and ruling his erstwhile competitors. Eagerness on the part of the Marcommani for terms perhaps left Marcus too comfortable to the degree that he never anticipated any initial aggressive moves from them.

== History ==
=== First Marcomannic War ===
==== Initial invasions ====
By the early 160s AD, mounting pressures along the Rhine and Danube frontiers led several Germanic tribes to invade Roman territory. Between 162 and 165, incursions by the Chatti and Chauci into Raetia and Germania Superior were repelled. In late 166, thousands of Langobardi and Lacringi (possibly the Obii) crossed into Pannonia. These movements increased pressure on other tribes along the Roman frontier.

The invaders were quickly defeated by local forces, including detachments from the Legio I Adiutrix under a commander named Candidus and the Ala Ulpia contariorum under Marcus Macrinius Avitus Catonius Vindex. Despite the swift victory, the incursion marked the beginning of a broader crisis. Marcus Iallius Bassus, governor of Pannonia, initiated negotiations with eleven tribes. (Note: Cassius Dio, LXXII, p. 12.) The Marcomannic king Ballomar, a Roman client, mediated and dismissed the raid as unrepresentative. A truce was reached and the tribes withdrew, though no permanent agreement followed. As Rome was still engaged in war with Parthia, the resolution—considered a bellum suspensum (Note: Roughly translates to unresolved conflict or suspended war.)—was seen as a diplomatic success, though the identities of the original raiders remain uncertain.

==== First Roman expedition in Pannonia (168) ====
The Antonine Plague severely limited Roman responses in the late 160s. A punitive expedition planned by Marcus Aurelius was postponed until 168. That spring, Marcus and Lucius Verus departed Rome and established headquarters at Aquileia. They reorganized defenses in Italy and Illyricum, raised the Legio II Italica and Legio III Italica, and crossed the Alps into Pannonia. The approach of the imperial army reportedly prompted the Marcomanni and Victuali to withdraw and pledge good conduct. The emperors returned to Aquileia for winter quarters, but in January 169, Lucius Verus suffered a fatal stroke en route and died. (Note: Historia Augusta, Lucius Verus, 9.7–11) Marcus returned to Rome to oversee his funeral and deification.

==== Campaign against the Iazyges and the Germanic invasion of Italy ====
In autumn 169, Marcus Aurelius, accompanied by his son-in-law Claudius Pompeianus, resumed the campaign. To finance the war effort, Marcus auctioned off imperial property—a measure historian Michael Kulikowski describes as the only viable alternative to raising taxes. The primary Roman objective was to punish the Iazyges, a Sarmatian people inhabiting the region between the Danube and Roman Dacia. Early in the campaign, the Iazyges killed Marcus Claudius Fronto, the governor of Lower Moesia.

While the Roman army was preoccupied, other tribes launched opportunistic raids across the frontier. In the east, the Costoboci crossed the Danube, pillaging Thrace and reaching as far south as Eleusis, where they destroyed the sanctuary of the Eleusinian Mysteries, but Rome reclaimed the Balkans with support from the port of Salonae in Dalmatia.

The Germanic tribes of Central Europe in the 1st century. The Marcomanni and Quadi occupied the region of modern Bohemia.

A more serious threat came from the Marcomanni in the west. Led by King Ballomar, they formed a coalition of Germanic tribes, crossed the Danube, and defeated a Roman force of 20,000 near Carnuntum, in what is sometimes called the Battle of Carnuntum. They then advanced south, ravaging Noricum and reaching northern Italy. The Marcomanni destroyed Oderzo (Opitergium) and besieged Aquileia, marking the first hostile incursion into Italy since the Cimbri invasion of 101 BC. Titus Furius Victorinus, the Praetorian prefect, attempted to relieve the city but was defeated and likely killed, though some sources attribute his death to plague. (Note: The precise date of the major Germanic incursion toward Aquileia remains debated. Some scholars, including biographer Frank McLynn, argue it occurred in 167, noting that by 170 the newly constructed Praetentura Italiae et Alpium (built 168–169) would have likely prevented such a breakthrough. They cite contemporary reports describing the invasion as a military walkover, inconsistent with fortified defenses. The panic in Rome during 167–168, McLynn contends, is also inexplicable if the tribes remained north of the Danube. Additionally, no sources place Marcus Aurelius near the front during the disaster, though he was there by 170. McLynn argues the Emperor and Lucius Verus traveled to Aquileia in 168 to stabilize morale after the defeat, as the city held no strategic value for a Danubian campaign. He further suggests that the later dating to 170 is based on overreliance on Lucian's questionable chronology regarding Alexander of Abonoteichos, whose relevance to the events is uncertain.)

==== Roman counter-offensive and defeat of the Marcomanni ====
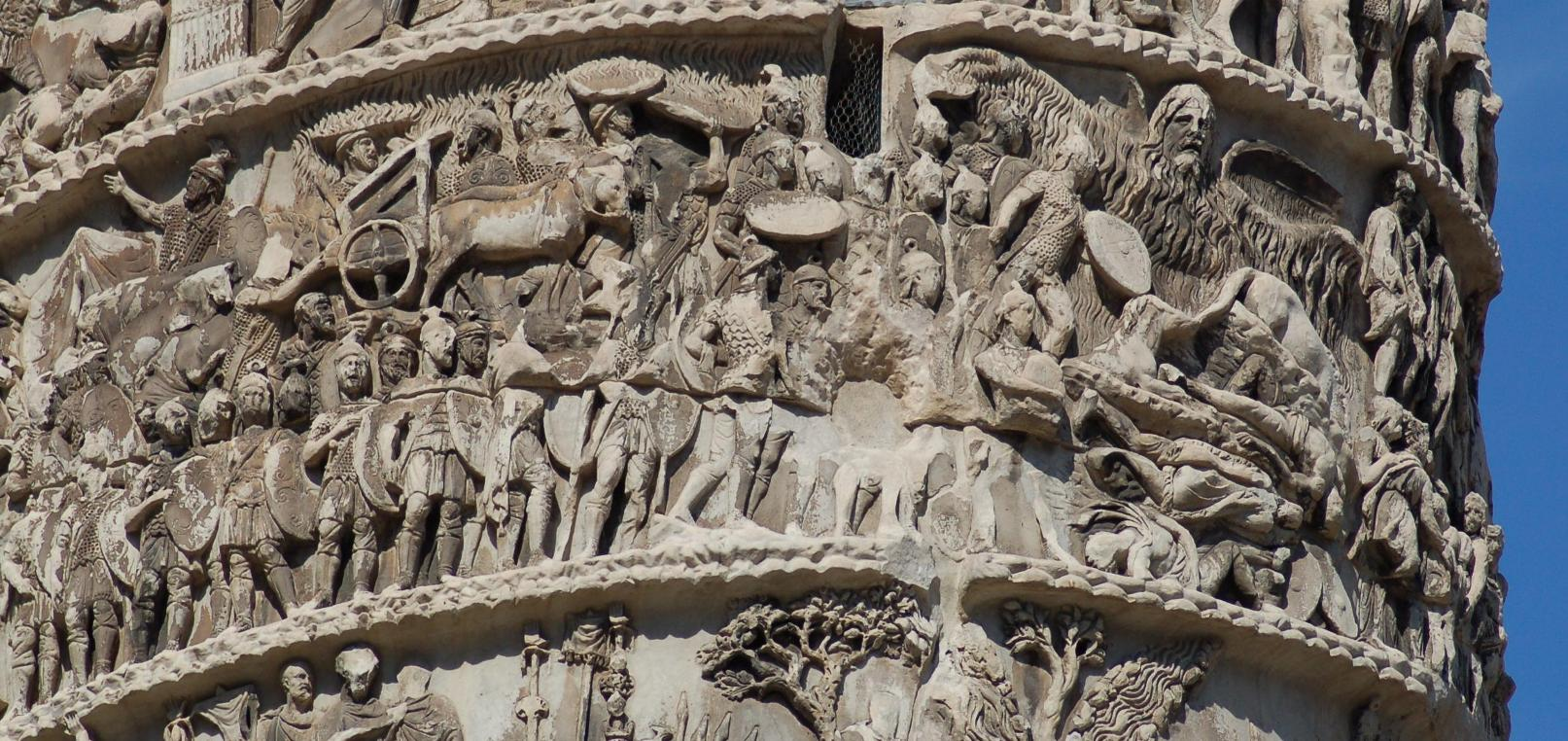
The "Miracle of the Rain", from the Aurelian column. An unidentified "rain god" (top right) saves the Roman army.

In response to the Marcomannic invasion, Marcus Aurelius reoriented Roman priorities and dispatched reinforcements from other frontiers. Command was entrusted to Tiberius Claudius Pompeianus, with the future emperor Pertinax serving under him. A new defensive zone, the Praetentura Italiae et Alpium, was established to safeguard northern Italy, and the Danube fleet was strengthened. Aquileia was relieved, and by late 171, invading forces had been expelled from Roman territory. Meanwhile, Rome pursued diplomatic efforts to divide its adversaries. Peace treaties were signed with the Quadi and Iazyges, while the Hasdingi Vandals and Lacringi became Roman allies.

During 172, Roman forces crossed the Danube into Marcomannic territory to push back the invasions undertaken by the various Germanic peoples. Although specific details are scarce, the campaign resulted in the subjugation of the Marcomanni and their allies, the Naristi (or Varistae) and the Cotini. Marcus Aurelius added the title "Germanicus" to his cognomen.

By 173, the Romans began to turn on the Quadi, who had violated their treaty. The campaign culminated in the so-called "Miracle of the Rain," in which the surrounded Legio XII Fulminata was saved by a sudden storm. (Note: Cassius Dio, LXXII.8–10.) Ancient accounts differ: Cassius Dio attributed the event to an Egyptian magician invoking Mercury, while Christian writers like Tertullian claimed it was the result of Christian prayer.

Bas-relief scenes depicting events of the Marcomannic Wars

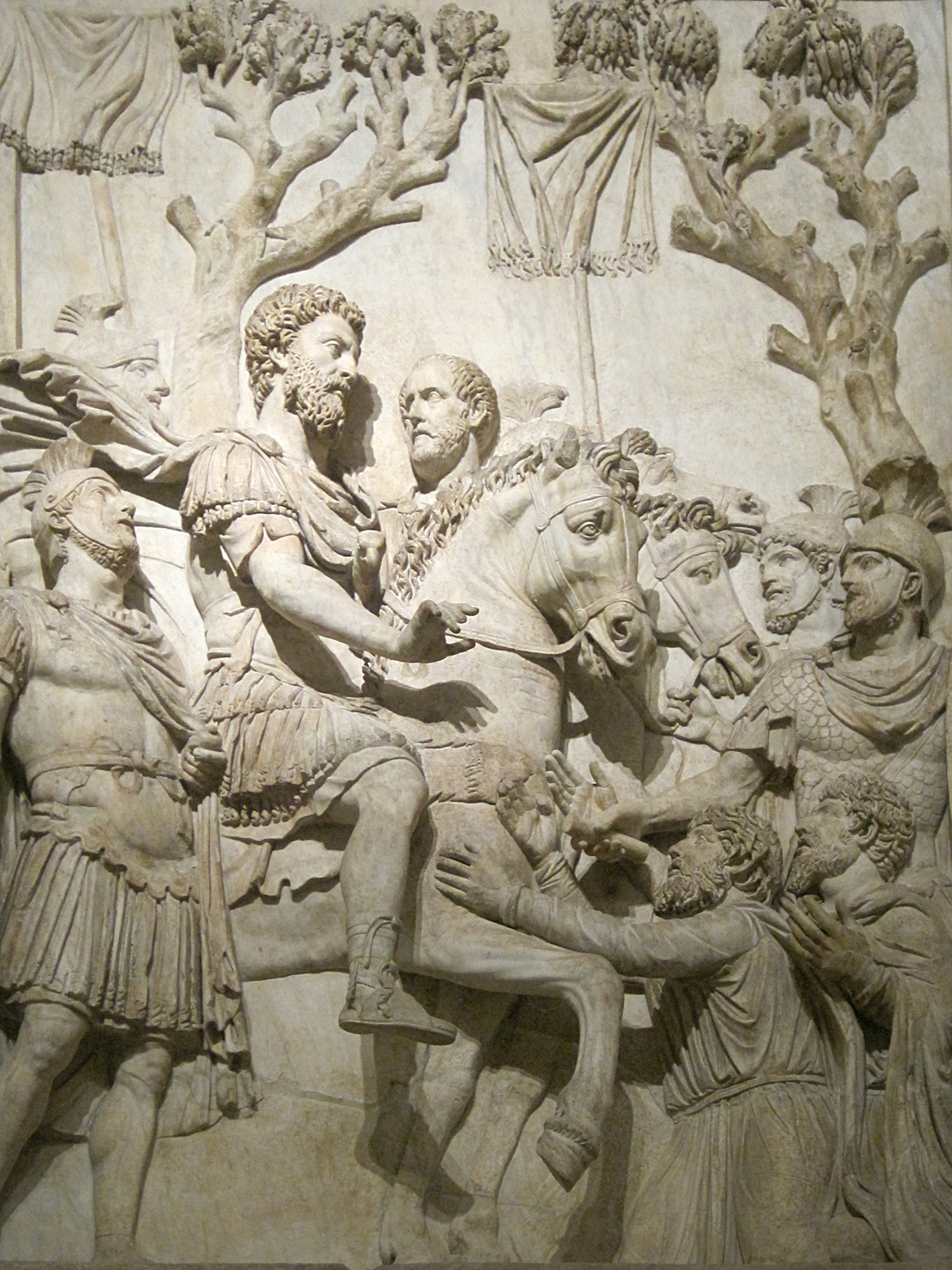
Marcus Aurelius receiving the submission of Germanic leaders

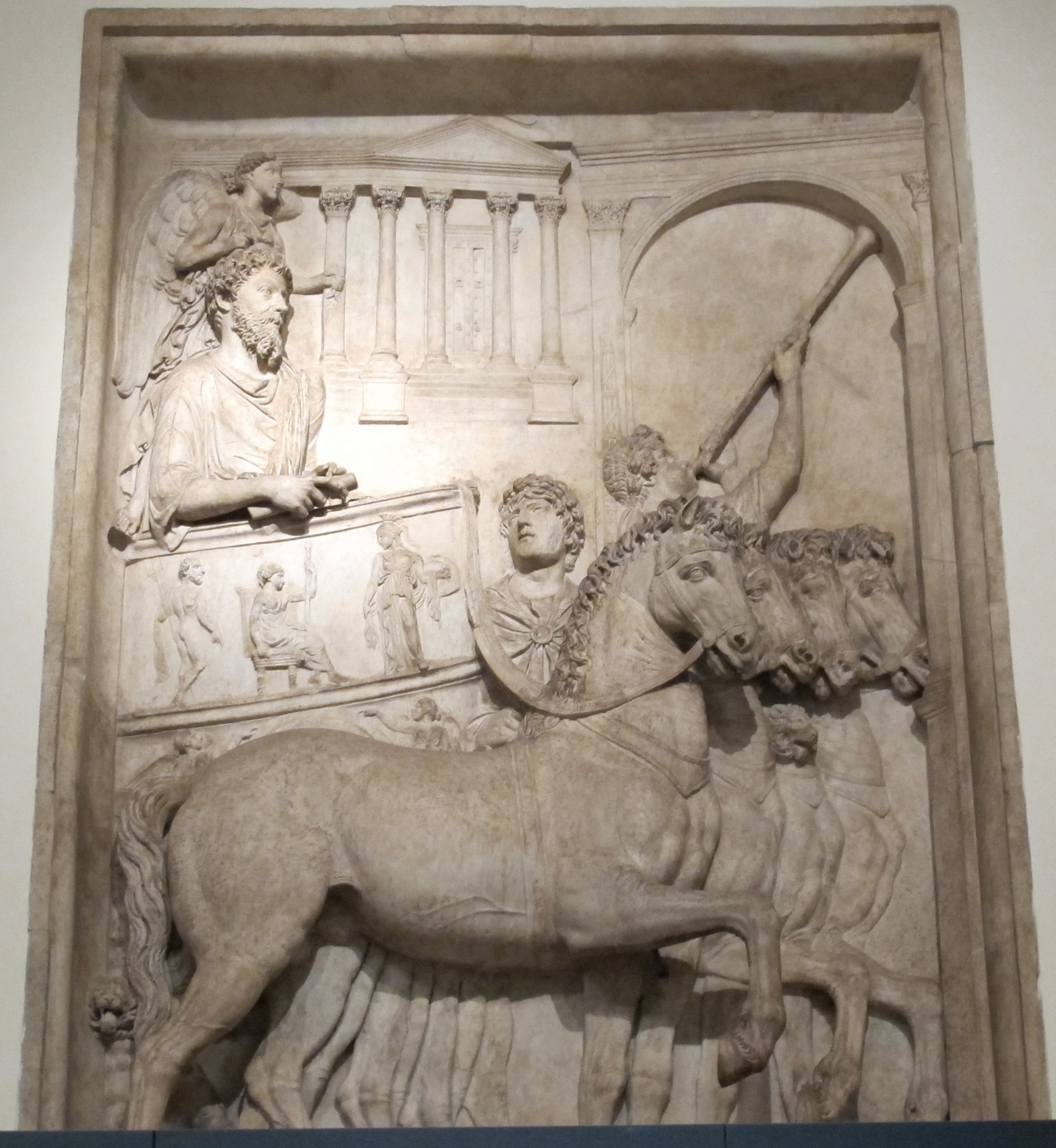
Marcus Aurelius celebrating his triumph in a quadriga

Reliefs from the now-lost Arch of Marcus Aurelius (176–180 AD), Capitoline Museums

In the same year, Didius Julianus, commanding the Rhine frontier, repelled invasions by the Chatti and Hermunduri, while the Chauci raided the coast of Gallia Belgica.

In 174, another campaign was launched against the Quadi. After deposing the pro-Roman king Furtius, they elevated Ariogaesus, whom Marcus refused to recognize. Marcus captured and exiled him to Alexandria. (Note: Cassius Dio, LXXII.13–14.) The Quadi were subdued and compelled to provide hostages, auxiliary troops, and accept Roman garrisons. Following the subjugation of the Quadi, Marcus Aurelius focused on the Iazyges, who occupied the plains along the Tisza River—a campaign known as the expeditio sarmatica. After a series of Roman victories, the Iazyges surrendered in 175. Their king, Zanticus, returned 100,000 Roman prisoners and provided 8,000 cavalry auxiliaries, of whom 5,500 were dispatched to Britain. (Note: A branch of the Sarmatians, the Iazyges were renowned for their use of heavily armored cataphract cavalry. See Cassius Dio, LXXII.16.) In recognition of the victory, Marcus adopted the title "Sarmaticus".

Marcus may have intended to consolidate the region by forming two new provinces, Marcomannia and Sarmatia, incorporating modern-day Czech Republic and Slovakia. However, these plans were interrupted by the rebellion of Avidius Cassius, governor of Syria, who declared himself emperor. (Note: Primary source: Historia Augusta, Marcus Aurelius, 24.5)

Marcus marched east with his army, accompanied by auxiliary detachments from the Marcomanni, Quadi, and Naristi, under the command of Marcus Valerius Maximianus. After suppressing the revolt, Marcus returned to Rome—the first time in nearly eight years. On 23 December 176, he and his son Commodus celebrated a joint triumph for victories over the Germans and Sarmatians ("de Germanis" and "de Sarmatis"). The Column of Marcus Aurelius was later erected in Rome to commemorate the campaigns, modeled after Trajan's Column.

=== Second Marcomannic War ===
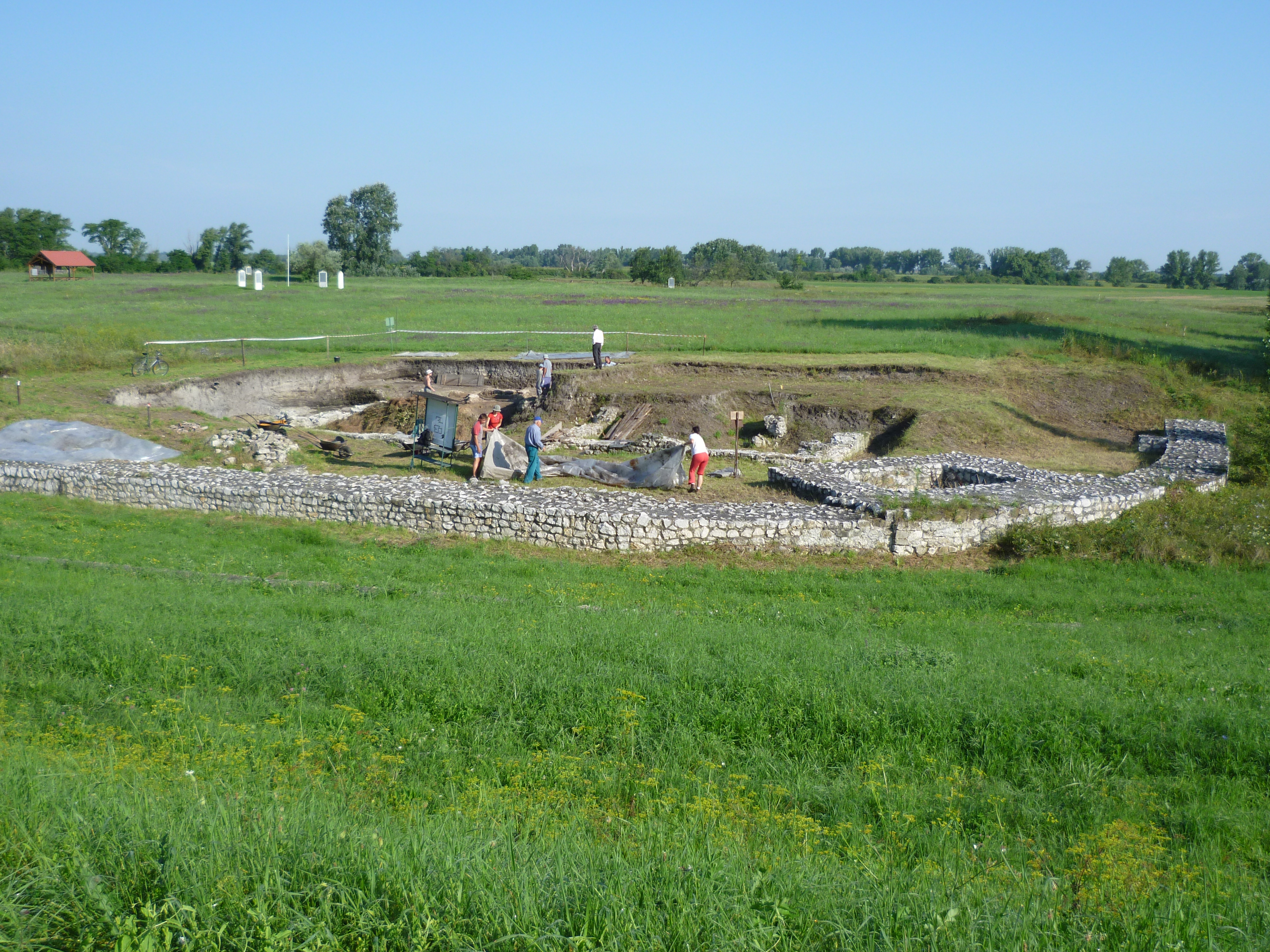
Celemantia, a Roman castellum on the left bank of Danube in Slovakia

Although Marcus Aurelius celebrated his victories in 176, hostilities resumed the following year. In 177, the Quadi rebelled, soon joined by the Marcomanni. Marcus once again marched north to launch a second campaign, the secunda expeditio Germanica. He arrived at Carnuntum in August 178 and led Roman forces into hostile territory, targeting first the Marcomanni, then the Quadi between 179 and 180.

In a decisive engagement near Laugaricio (modern-day Trenčín, Slovakia), Roman forces under Marcus Valerius Maximianus defeated the Quadi. The survivors retreated deeper into Germania Magna, where Publius Tarrutenius Paternus, the praetorian prefect, secured another major victory. However, on 17 March 180, Marcus Aurelius died at Vindobona (modern Vienna). His son and successor, Commodus, showed little interest in continuing the campaign. Ignoring the counsel of his generals, Commodus negotiated peace with the Marcomanni and Quadi. He returned to Rome later that year and celebrated a triumph on 22 October 180.

=== Third Marcomannic War ===
Following Marcus Aurelius’s death, operations continued beyond the Danube. Roman forces campaigned against the Iazyges, the Buri, and the so-called "free Dacians" inhabiting the region between the Danube and Roman Dacia. Details of this phase are sparse, but commanders included Marcus Valerius Maximianus, Pescennius Niger, and Clodius Albinus. An inscription (CIL III 5937) refers to a campaign against the Lugii or Buri (Expeditio Burica). These victories were evidently sufficient for Commodus to adopt the title "Germanicus Maximus" by 182.

== Aftermath ==
The Marcomannic Wars revealed vulnerabilities in Rome’s northern defenses. Thereafter, half of the Empire’s legions (16 out of 33) were stationed along the Rhine and Danube. Germanic settlement increased in frontier regions including Dacia, Pannonia, Germania, and parts of Italy. While such integration was not unprecedented, the scale necessitated new administrative measures. Plans were made to establish the provinces of Marcomannia and Sarmatia on the north side of the Danube, encompassing parts of modern Czech Republic and Slovakia. However, not all integration was successful. A group of Germanic settlers in Ravenna rebelled and briefly seized control of the city. In response, Marcus Aurelius banned further settlement of "barbarians" in Italy and expelled those already present. (Note: Cassius Dio, LXXII, p. 11.)

Though the Germanic tribes were checked temporarily, the Marcomannic Wars foreshadowed the large-scale invasions of the 4th and 5th centuries that would contribute to the disintegration of the Western Roman Empire.

== In popular culture ==
- Two films, The Fall of the Roman Empire (1964) and Gladiator (2000), open with a fictionalized portrayal of a final battle of the Marcomannic Wars.

== Maps ==
Key: Red arrows: Romans. Green arrows: Marcomanns. Italy and Adriatic Sea at bottom left corner.

First Marcomannic War

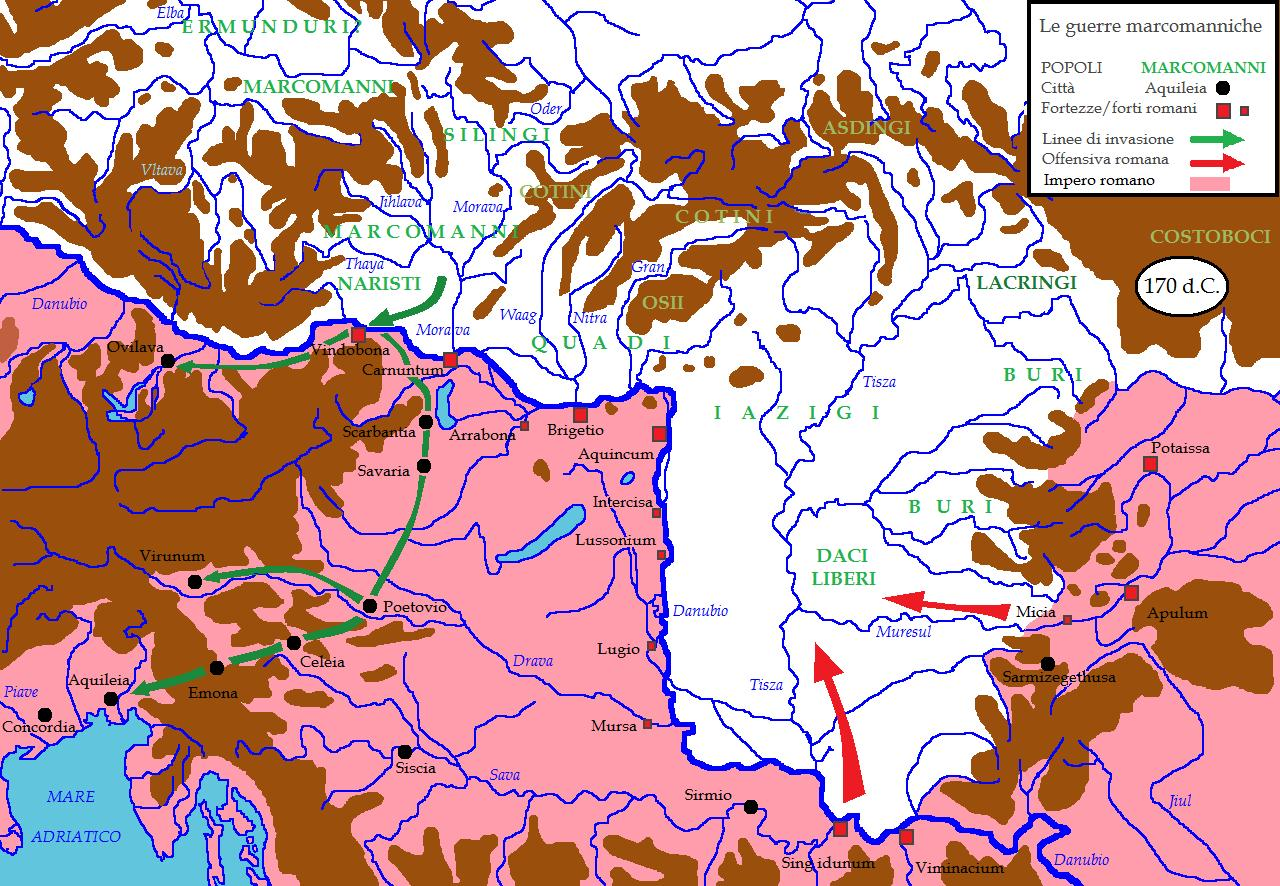
Roman expedition against the Iazyges in the eastern Pannonian Plain and the great Marcomannic invasion (either 167 or 170)

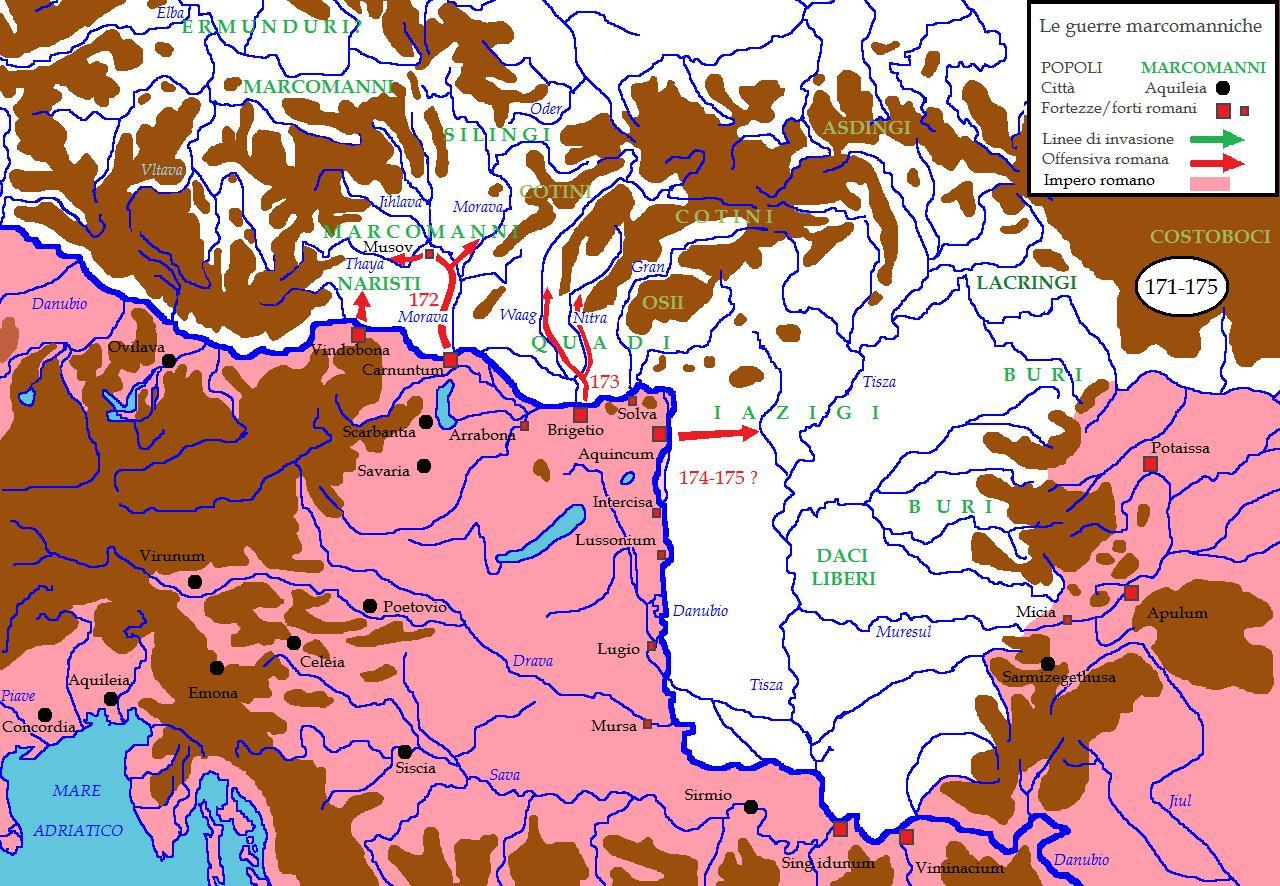
Roman counter-offensive across the Danube, 171–175

Second Marcomannic War

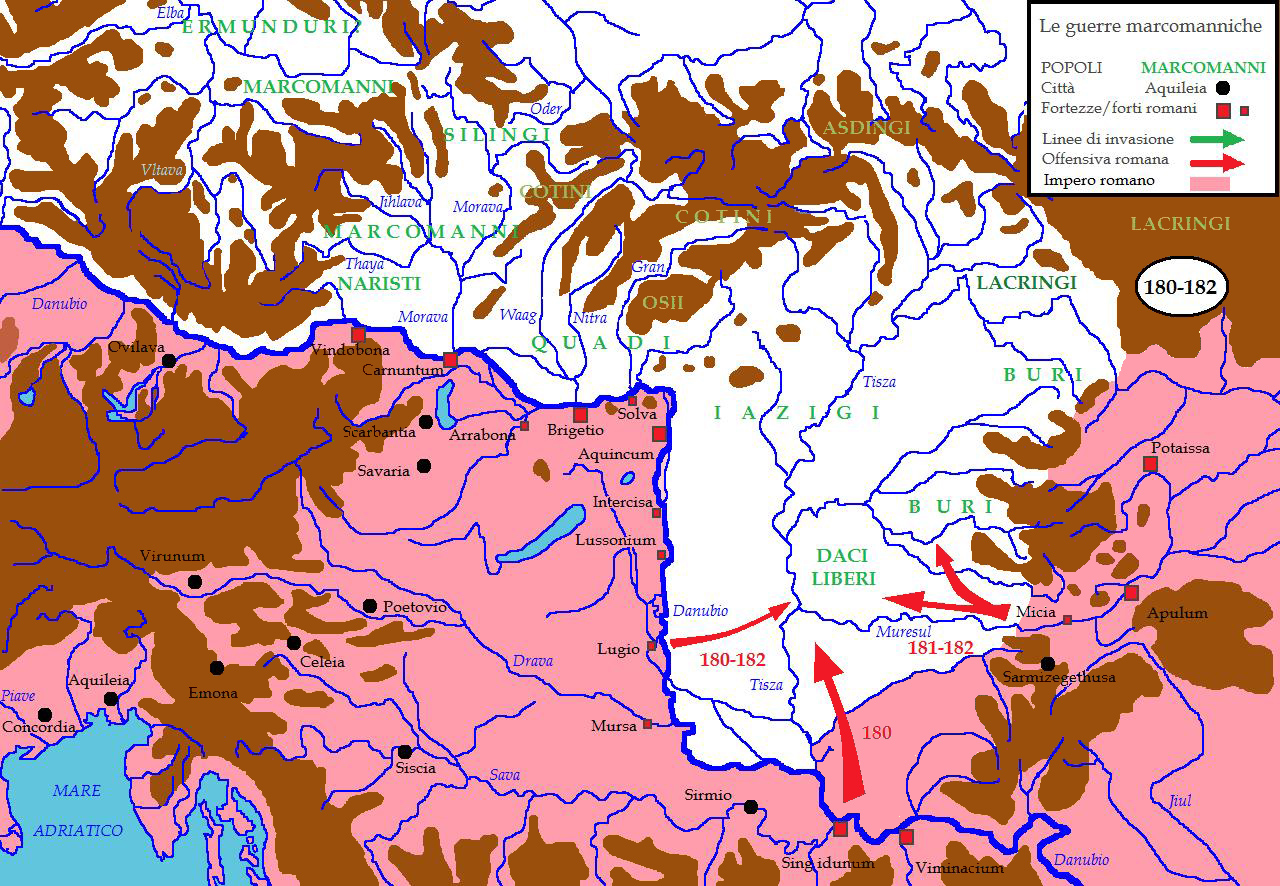
Roman operations, 180–182

== Bibliography ==
- Bunson, Matthew (1995). A Dictionary of the Roman Empire. Oxford and New York: Oxford University Press. ISBN 978-0-19510-233-8.
- Cassius Dio, Historia romana, Books LXXII & LXXIII
- Fitz, Jenő (1966). "Der markomannisch-quadische Angriff gegen Aquileia und Opitergium". Historia: Zeitschrift für alte Geschichte. 15 (3): 336–367. JSTOR 4434940.
- Goldsworthy, Adrian (2016). Pax Romana. New Haven and London: Yale University Press. ISBN 978-0-30017-882-1.
- Harper, Kyle (2017). The Fate of Rome: Climate, Disease, and the End of an Empire. Princeton and Oxford: Princeton University Press. ISBN 978-0-69116-683-4.
- Herodian, History of the Roman Empire since the Death of Marcus Aurelius Archived 4 May 2015 at the Wayback Machine, Book I, Ch. 1–6.
- Historia Augusta, The. Lives of Marcus Aurelius. 1 & 2, Lucius Verus and Commodus (Loeb Classical Library edition).
- Kehne, Peter; Tejral, Jaroslav (2001). "Markomannenkrieg". In Beck, Heinrich; Geuenich, Dieter; Steuer, Heiko (eds.). Reallexikon der Germanischen Altertumskunde (in German). Vol. 19 (2 ed.). De Gruyter. pp. 308–321. ISBN 978-3-11-017163-1.
- Kershaw, Stephen P. (2019). The Enemies of Rome: The Barbarian Rebellion Against the Roman Empire. New York and London: Pegasus Books. ISBN 978-1-64313-310-2.
- Kovács, Péter (2009). Marcus Aurelius' Rain Miracle and the Marcomannic Wars. Leiden and Boston: Brill. ISBN 978-9-00416-639-4.
- Kulikowski, Michael (2016). The Triumph of Empire: The Roman World from Hadrian to Constantine. Cambridge, MA: The Belknap Press of Harvard University Press. ISBN 978-0-67465-961-2.
- Lacey, James (2022). Rome: Strategy of Empire. Oxford and New York: Oxford University Press. ISBN 978-0-67466-013-7.
- Mackay, Penny (2004). Ancient Rome: A Military and Political History. Cambridge and New York: Cambridge University Press. ISBN 978-0-52171-149-4.
- Marcus Aurelius (2007). "Meditations". Internet Classics Archive. Archived from the original on 13 October 2007.
- McLynn, Frank (2009). Marcus Aurelius: A Life. Cambridge, MA: Da Capo Press. ISBN 978-0-30681-830-1.
- Robertson, Donald. How to Think Like a Roman Emperor: The Stoic Philosophy of Marcus Aurelius. New York: St. Martin's Press, 2019.
- Wolfram, Herwig (1988). History of the Goths. Berkeley and Los Angeles: University of California Press. ISBN 0-520-05259-5.

=== Further reading ===
- Erdrich, Michael; Komoróczy, Balázs; Madejski, Paweł; Vlach, Marek (eds) (2020). Marcomannic Wars and Antonine Plague. Selected Essays on two disasters that shook the Roman World. Die Markomannenkriege und die Antoninische Pest. Ausgewählte Essays zu zwei Desastern, die das Römische Reich erschütterten. Brno/Lublin: Czech Academy of Sciences/Maria Curie-Skłodowska University, ISBN 978-80-7524-026-2 and ISBN 978-83-227-9223-0.
- Hund, Ragnar (2017). Studien zur Außenpolitik der Kaiser Antoninus Pius und Marc Aurel im Schatten der Markomannenkriege [Studies on the foreign policy of the emperors Antoninus Pius and Marcus Aurelius in the shadow of the Marcomannic Wars]. Pharos, vol. 40. Rahden: Marie Leidorf, ISBN 978-3-86757-268-2.
