= List of Roman governors of Upper Moesia =

This is a list of Roman governors of Upper Moesia (Moesia Superior), located where the modern state of Serbia currently is. This province was created from the province of Moesia by the Emperor Domitian in AD 86.

86/87-87/88	Lucius Funisulanus Vettonianus
88/89-89/90	Lucius Tettius Julianus
93/94-96/97	Gnaeus Pinarius Aemilius Cicatricula Pompeius Longinus
100-c. 101/102	Gaius Cilnius Proculus
101?/102–103/106	Lucius Herennius Saturninus
c. 109–112	Titus Prifernius Paetus
c. 115	Lucius Tutilius Lupercus
c. 120	Lucius Coelius Rufus
c. 126	Gaius Julius Gallus
Between 126 and 129/130	Titus Minicus Opimianus
c. 130-132	Lucius Vitrasius Flamininus
After 132	Publius Tullius Varro
Between 143 and c. 149	Publius Cluvius Maximus Paullinus
c. 149-c. 152	Publius Mummius Sisenna Rutilianus
c. 152-c. 155	Quintus Egrilius Plarianus
c. 155-c. 157	Marcus Valerius Etruscus
c. 157-c. 159	Gaius Curtius Justus
c. 159-Beginning 161	Marcus Pontius Sabinus
Beginning 161 - Summer/Fall 161	Marcus Statius Priscus Licinius Italicus
161-162	Marcus Servilius Fabianus Maximus
168-169	Marcus Claudius Fronto
c.172-c.175	Marcus Macrinius Avitus Catonius Vindex
c. 177-c. 179	Publius Helvius Pertinax
c. 193-195	Lucius Fabius Clio
195-199	Gaius Gabinius Barbarus Pompeianus
c. 202-205	Quintus Anicius Faustus
Between 211 and 214	Lucius Marius Perpetuus
Between 230 and 242	Egnatius Victor Marinianus
c. 242	Lucius Catius Celer

== See also ==
- List of Roman governors of Moesia
- List of Roman governors of Lower Moesia
