= List of Roman governors of Moesia =

First-century provincial leaders

This is a list of Roman governors of Moesia, located where the modern states of Bulgaria and Romania (Dobruja) currently are. In AD 86 this province was divided in to Moesia Superior and Moesia Inferior by the Emperor Domitian.

Date	Name
before 4 BC, or AD 9-11	Aelius Catus
15-35	Gaius Poppaeus Sabinus
between 47 and c. 53	Gaius Terentius Tullius Geminus
c. 53-60	Titus Flavius Sabinus
60-66	Tiberius Plautius Silvanus Aelianus
66-68	Gaius Pomponius Pius
69	Marcus Aponius Saturninus
69/70	Gaius Fonteius Agrippa
70-71	Rubrius Gallus
74-79	Sextus Vettulenus Cerialis
81-84	Gaius Vettulenus Civica Cerealis
84/85	Gaius Oppius Sabinus
85/86	Marcus Cornelius Nigrinus Curiatius Maternus

== See also ==
- List of Roman governors of Lower Moesia
- List of Roman governors of Upper Moesia
