= Ballomar =

Mid-2nd century king of the Marcomanni

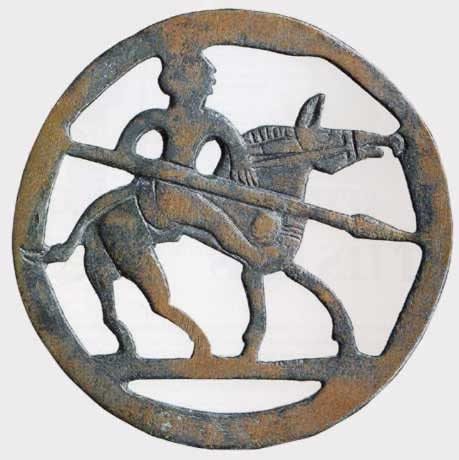

Ballomar or Ballomarios (AD 140 – AD 170–180) was a leader of the Marcomanni during the Marcomannic Wars.

The name "Ballomar" can be broken down into two Celtic elements, ballo- meaning "limb, member" (cf. Gaulish ballos Irish ball), and maro meaning "great" (cf. Gaulish maros, Welsh mawr, Irish mór).^{;}^{;}

Ballomar is first mentioned by Cassius Dio as conducting peace talks with the governor of Pannonia Superior, Marcus Jallius Bassus, following the breakthrough of the limes by his allies the Germanic Lombards and Ubii. Ballomar led the great invasion of Italy by a coalition of Celtic and Germanic tribes in 167–170 AD, which was the first time a hostile force had entered Italy since the Cimbri of Boiorix during the Cimbrian War. Ballomar defeated a force of 20,000 Roman soldiers near Carnuntum, destroyed Opitergium (Oderzo) and besieged Aquileia.

Ballomar might be the character on episode XXV on the Column of Marcus Aurelius, who surrenders on behalf of the Marcomannic to Marcus Aurelius. The dating of this episode is around 172 AD.

== In fiction ==
Ballomar is a character in the 1964 film The Fall of the Roman Empire, played by John Ireland.

== Sources ==
- Cassius Dio, Historia romana, Books LXXII & LXXIII
- The column of Marcus Aurelius in Rome, which apparently depicts Ballomar
