= Catus =

Catus may refer to:

- Catus, Lot, a commune in France
- Aelius Catus, Roman commander

== See also ==
- Felis catus, the scientific name for cat
- Aelia gens
