= List of Roman governors of Lower Moesia =

Provincial leaders AD 86–275

This is a list of Roman governors of Lower Moesia (Moesia Inferior), located where the modern states of Bulgaria and Romania (Dobruja) currently are. This province was created from the province of Moesia by the Emperor Domitian in AD 86.

c. 86-89	Marcus Cornelius Nigrinus Curiatius Maternus
c. 89-93	Sextus Octavius Fronto
c. 95-98	[ ? Lucius] Julius Mar(inus)?
c. 98-100	Quintus Pomponius Rufus
c. 100-102	Manius Laberius Maximus
c. 102-103	Quintus Fabius Postuminus
c. 103-105	Aulus Caecilius Faustinus
c. 105-108	Lucius Fabius Justus
c. 110-113	Publius Calpurnius Macer Caulius Rufus
c. 115-118	Quintus Pompeius Falco
c. 118-122	Gaius Ummidius Quadratus Sertorius Severus
c. 124-128	Gaius Bruttius Praesens Lucius Fulvius Rusticus
c. 128-131	Sextus Julius Severus
c. 131-135	Sextus Julius Major
c. 136-c.139	Marcus Antonius Hiberus
c. 142-c. 145	Lucius Minicius Natalis Quadronius Verus
c. 145-c. 148	Tiberius Claudius Saturninus
c. 148-c. 151	Gaius Prastina Messalinus
c. 151-c. 153/154	Quintus Fuficius Cornutus
c. 153/154-c. 156	Titus Flavius Longinus Quintus Marcius Turbo
c. 156-c. 159	Titus Pomponius Proculus Vitrasius Pollio
c. 159-160	Lucius Julius Statilius Severus
c. 162	Marcus Iallius Bassus Fabius Valerianus
162-c. 166	Marcus Servilius Fabianus Maximus
c. 166-c. 169	(Marcus) Pontius Laelianus
c. 172	Marcus Valerius Bradua
c. 175-c. 176	Marcus Macrinius Avitus Catonius Vindex
c. 176-c. 177	Publius Helvius Pertinax
c. 176-178	Gaius Junius Faustinus Placidus Postumianus
(?) 193-194	Publius Septimius Geta
193/194-195	Pollenius Auspex (minor)
195-198	Cosconius Gentianus Ge[---]
198-201	Gaius Ovinius Tertullus
201-(?)204	Lucius Aurelius Gallus
(?)204-(?)207	?C. Junius Faustinus [?Pl]a[ci]dus Postumianus
(?)207-210	Lucius Julius Faustinianus
210-(?)213	Flavius Ulpianus
(?)213-(?)216	Quintilianus
(?)216-June/Aug. 217	Marcus Statius Longinus
June/Aug. 217-Nov./Dec. 217	Pontius Fu(rius) Pontianus
Nov./Dec. 217-(?)218	Marcius Clau(dius) Agrippa
c. 218-c. 220	Titus Flavius Novius Rufus
c. 220-221	Julius Antonius Seleucus
c. 222	Sergius Titianus
c. 222-c. 224	Julius Gaetulicus
c. 224	Lucius Annius Italicus Honoratus
between 224 and 226	Fir[mus] Philopappus
between 224 and 226	Tiberus Julius Festus
between 226 and 227	Um[...] Tereventinus
c. 227-229	Lucius Mantennius Sabinus
229-230 or c. 230-232	[Sextus ?] Anicius Faustus Paulinus
c. 234	Gaius Messius Quintus Decius
between 193 and 238	Gaius Titius Similis
c. 235-236	Domitius Antigonus
c. 236-238	Lucius Flavius Honoratus Lucilianus
c. 238-241	Tullius Menophilus
c. 241-242/243	Sabinius Modestus
c. 242/243-244	Prosius Tertullianus
c. 244	Gaius Prastina Messalinus
c. 246-247	Severianus
c. 247-248	Tiberius Claudius Marinus Pacatianus
c. 248	Gaius Messius Quintus Decius
c. ?	Gaius Pe[...]
c. 249-250	Publius Post[...]
c. 250-251	Gaius Vibius Trebonianus Gallus
c. 253	Marcus Aemilius Aemilianus
c. 256-257	Vitennius Iuvenis
c. 257-258	Ingenuus
c. 258-259	Publius Gaius ... Regalianus
c. 272-275	Marcus Aurelius Sebastianus
c. ?	Claudius Natalianus
Reign of Diocletian	Silvius Silvanus

== See also ==
- List of Roman governors of Moesia
- List of Roman governors of Upper Moesia
