= Marcus Macrinius Avitus Catonius Vindex =

Roman general, senator and consul (c.134–c.176)

Suffect consul of the Roman Empire
- In office c. 175
- Monarch: Marcus Aurelius

Governor of Moesia Inferior
- In office 175–176
- Preceded by: Marcus Valerius Bradua
- Succeeded by: Pertinax

Governor of Moesia Superior
- In office 172–175
- Preceded by: Marcus Claudius Fronto
- Succeeded by: Pertinax

Procurator of Dacia Malvensis
- In office Around 170

Personal details
- Born: c. 134 Unclear, possibly Camulodunum or Colonia Agrippa, Roman Empire
- Died: c. 176 (aged 42) Moesia Inferior, Roman Empire
- Roman tribe: Claudia
- Military career
- Branch: Imperial Roman army
- Rank: Military tribune and prefectus
- Commands: Cohors VI Gallorum; Ala III Thracum; Ala Ulpia contariorum
- Awards: dona militaria

Marcus Macrinius Avitus Catonius Vindex (c. 134 – c. 176) was a Roman senator who was active during the reign of Marcus Aurelius. Originally a member of the equestrian order, Vindex demonstrated courage and intelligence that led to his award of dona militaria and elevation into the Senate, followed by his appointment to the consulate, which Géza Alföldy dates to an undetermined nundinium around the year 175.

== Family background ==
The family origins of the Macrinii Vindices are unusual. Anthony Birley notes the possibility – "however remote" – that Vindex came from Camulodunum (modern Colchester) in Britannia. Birley notes the only equites attested as living in Britain, Macr[...], was a resident of that city; he also notes Vindex was enrolled in the Roman tribe Claudia, to which Camulodunum belonged. While Alföldy offers Camuldounum as one possibility, he also mentions Colonia Agrippa as equally plausible alternative, but in any case Vindex came from one of the Western provinces.

If Vindex came from a family native to Camuldounum, then he would be a member of a very tiny elite group: Roman senators from Roman Britain. According to Birley, "At any rate, no certain British senators can be detected, apart from the anomalous King Cogidubnus". One more Roman senator possibly came from Britain, Marcus Statius Priscus, consul in 159, although Alföldy, amongst others, argues more persuasively that Priscus came from Dalmatia. A prerequisite to becoming a consul, as with all of the traditional Roman magistracies, is that one must be enrolled in the Senate. While Cognidubnus was a senator, he never acceded to the consulship. Of the remaining two, Vindex is more certain to have come from Britain than Priscus, which could make him the only consul known to have come from Roman Britain.

Of interest is the praetorian prefect, Marcus Macrinius Vindex, also a member of the tribus Claudia. Alföldy is confident he was the father of the younger Vindex, while Birley merely states that the older Vindex "perhaps" was the father of the younger. An inscription on the tombstone of the younger Vindex in Rome mentions the name of his wife, Junia Flaccinila, and his daughter Macrinia Rufus.

== Career as an equites ==
The same Roman tombstone provides details of his career. The first part of Vindex's career was an example of the tres militiae of an equestrian officer. His first recorded commission was praefectus of the Cohors VI Gallorum, which was stationed in Roman Britain. This was followed by a commission as tribunus angusticlavius in Legio VI Victrix also stationed in Britannia. His next two commissions were to units stationed in Pannonia Superior. The first was as prefectus of the Ala III Thracum, the second unit was prefectus of the Ala Ulpia contariorum, a cavalry military unit -- a unit one thousand strong.

His tres militiae presents some issues. One is that normally the equestrian career consists of three posts; Eric Birley has suggested that in the second and third centuries, possibly an innovation of Hadrian, that a fourth post was added, the command of an ala miliara, which would explain this fourth posting. As there were only a dozen units of this type in the Roman Empire of the 2nd century AD according to Birley's count, their commanders could be considered the elite of the equestrian military service.

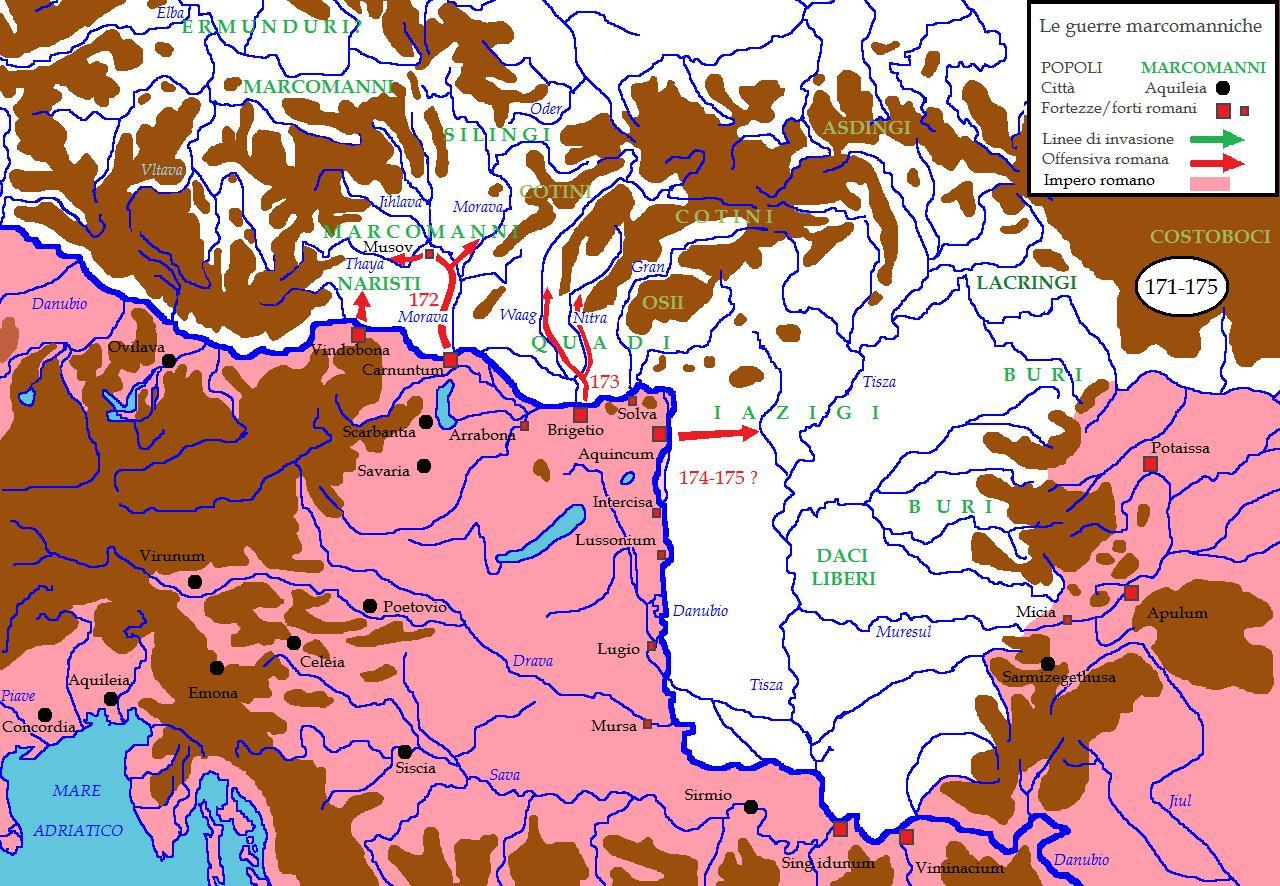
The lowlands of Panonnia and western Dacia, circa AD 171-175

The second issue is for which act Vindex received military honors. According to Valerie Maxwell, the scale of his awards better fit a tribunus laticlavus than an equestrian officer, which is what a tribunus angusticlavius was. It was while commander of a cavalry unit – most likely the Ala Contariorum – that Vindex appears in history: Cassius Dio records that, in the winter of 166/167 and with the help of some infantry under one Candidus, Vindex and his cavalry repulsed a force of Langobards and Obii who had crossed the Danube into Roman territory. This victory as a very senior equestrian officer may have been sufficient to justify the awards.

The last posting Vindex held as an equites was as procurator of Dacia Malvensis. This was not part of the tres militiae, but an administrative posting, and its duties included collecting taxes and rents. Anthony Birley suggests the emperor Marcus Aurelius assigned him this posting because of his military experience, however, due to continued pressure from the barbarians who had re-entered the Great Hungarian Plain and perhaps even crossed the Tisza river from the northwest. Vindex had a crucial role in defending Roman territory, for there was a gap in leadership in the time between the disappearance of the governor of Roman Dacia, Sextus Calpurnius Agricola – possibly dead from the Antonine Plague, or killed in action – and Marcus Claudius Fronto, governor of the neighboring province of Moesia Superior, was able to assume authority in the beleaguered province.

== Career as a Roman senator ==
The second part of his career began when Vindex was adlected into the Senate inter praeterio, that is, he was admitted into that deliberative body with the rank of ex-praetor. The reason for this has not been recorded. While he had shown military skill, Vindex had been decorated once for his victory over the Germans. Another possibility is the likelihood his father may have been the praetorian prefect; Alföldy connects his adlection to the date the older Vindex died in combat. Nevertheless, their familial connection is not certain. A third possibility was the effects of the above-mentioned Antonine Plague, which doubtlessly claimed the lives of at least a few senators: besides Calpurnius Agricola, another senator who is thought to have possibly died from this epidemic was the orator Fronto. The emperor Marcus Aurelius would have appointed leading men in order to bring the Senate up to full strength, as had Vespasian after the Year of Four Emperors.

The first honor Vindex achieved after being enrolled in the Senate was curator of the city of Ariminum; Alföldy believes he succeeded Gaius Arrius Antoninus, consul a few years before Vindex, in this role. At some point after his adlection, Vindex was admitted to the collegium of augurs. He was appointed governor of the imperial province of Moesia Superior; Alföldy dates his tenure in this appointment from about the year 172 to 175. His suffect consulate followed; Alföldy believes he held this magistracy in absentia; Vindex did not return to Rome to hold the fasces, but remained in his province.

Upon completion of his tenure in Moesia Superior, Vindex was appointed governor of the adjacent province of Moesia Inferior. While governor of this province, a soldier by the name of Quintus Valerius Atinianus erected an altar dedicated to the goddess Diana; this monument provides independent confirmation of Vindex's posting. Alföldy dates his tenure in this province from about the year 175 to his death, which he dates to 176. The tombstone of Vindex states he was 42 years and 5 months old at the time of his death, which if Alföldy is correct would put his birth in the year 134.
