= Moesi =

Ancient Paleo-Balkan tribe

In Roman literature of the early 1st century CE, the Moesi (/ˈmiːsaɪ/ or /ˈmiːzaɪ/; Ancient Greek: Μοισοί, Moisoí or Μυσοί, Mysoí; Latin: Moesi or Moesae) appear as a tribe who lived in the region around the Timok River to the south of the Danube. The Moesi do not appear in ancient sources before Augustus's death in 14 CE and are mentioned only by three authors dealing with the Roman warfare in the region and the ethnonymic situation between mid-1st century BC and mid-1st century CE: Ovid, Strabo and Livy. A Paleo-Balkan tribe known as the Moesi never actually existed in the Danube area before that period, it was a Roman invention. The ethnonym was transplanted from Asia Minor Mysians to the Balkans by the Romans as a replacement of the name of the Dardani who lived in the territory that later became the province of Moesia Superior. This decision in Roman literature is linked to the appropriation of the name Dardani in official Roman ideological discourse as Trojan ancestors of the Romans and the creation of a fictive name for the actual Dardani who were seen as barbarians and antagonists of Rome in antiquity. This new fictive Augustan terminology was illogically and controversially argumented by Strabo as the result of Aelius Catus's displacement of 50,000 Getae from the north to the south of the Danube, who settled areas in the north-eastern parts of the later province of Moesia Superior, thereafter being called "Moesi".

The Latin name Moesia was given first to the province of Moesia Superior and expanded into Moesia Inferior along the Danube. After the recreation of Dardania, Moesia referred to Moesia Prima, the northern part of Moesia Superior. A civitas of the Moesi which was reorganized as a Roman colony was located around Ratiaria in the first century AD.

== Name ==
The ethnic name of the Balkan Μοισοί Moesi, as well as of the Anatolian Μυσοί Mysoi, seems to be based on the root Masa, from the Paleo-Balkan word for 'horse', *me(n)za-; also the ethnic name Muška seems to be a suffixal derivative holding some kind of semantic distinction from the original root. They have been connected with the Albanian word for 'mule' mushk(ë) (virtually identical to Muška/i), Romanian muşcoiu and Aromanian musca, as well as in almost all Slavic languages (cf. Old Church Slavonic мьзгъ or мьскъ, Serbo-Croatian mazak or maz(a)g, Old Czech mesh, mzha, mezek, mezk 'hinny', Old Russian москъ, мъскъ or мьскъ etc.). The root is generally considered to have originated in the Balkans and thereafter spreading into the Slavic zone.

Already in the 19th century German linguist Gustav Meyer suggested a link between Μυσοί and Albanian mushk. He perceived mushk as a suffixal formation *mus-k-o-, noting the phonetic similarity between the terms. Furthermore, he provided the evidence of a fragment written by Anacreon mentioning the Mysians of Anatolia as 'inventors' of the interbreeding between jacks and mares. Also according to Mayer the northern parts of Anatolia might have been the homeland of the mules. A connection of Mysians with mules is also present already in Homer's Iliad.

An alternative Paleo-Balkan comparison has been drawn with Iuppiter Menzanas, mentioned in a passage written by Festus in relation to a Messapian horse sacrifice, and in ΜΕΖΗΝΑ̣Ι from a Thracian inscription on the Duvanli gold ring also bearing the image of a horseman. Both these attestations might indicate that *me(n)zana- means 'horseman' and consequently that the root *me(n)za- means 'horse'. The term has been further compared with Albanian mëz or mâz 'foal', which also finds a correlation with Romanian mînz. (Note: Although Alb. mëz/mâz is usually considered to be inherited from Proto-Albanian *mandja-, related to PAlb. *mänd (cf. Alb. mënd, 'to suckle'), from a Paleo-Balkan perspective it seems more likely to explain the usage of the name *me(n)-za- ('horse') for 'foal' after a later semantic shift 'horse' > 'foal' in Albanian, which was triggered by the loan from Latin caballus into Albanian kalë ('horse').)

The province of Moesia was named after the name Moesi.

=== Ancient literature ===
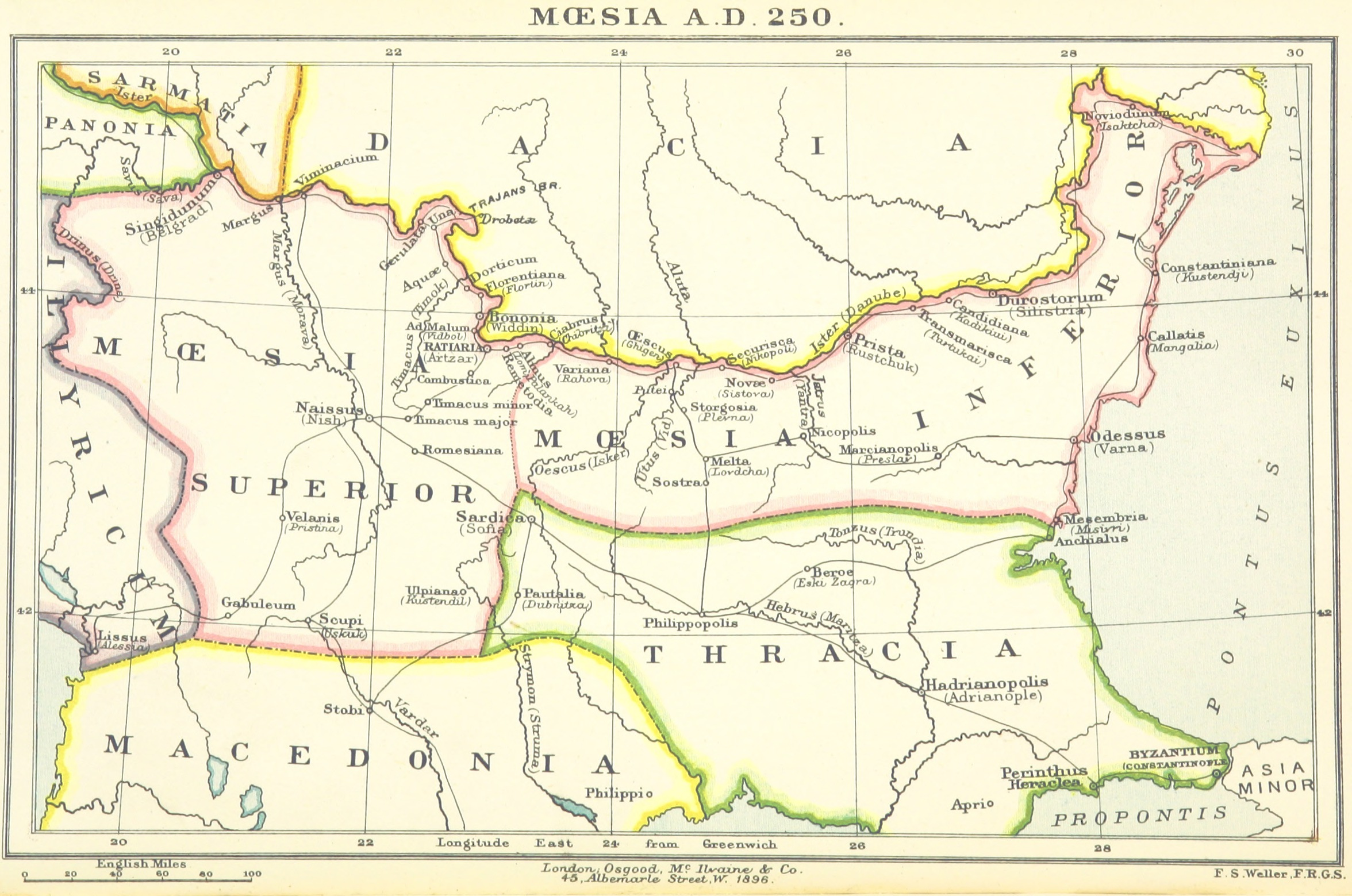
Roman Moesia in 250 AD, divided into the provinces of Moesia Superior to the west and Moesia Inferior to the east

In the late 1st century BCE, in Rome a new ideological discourse was formed. Propagated by poets like Horace and Ovid, it constructed a glorious Trojan past for the Romans, who were claimed to be descendants of Trojan Dardanians. In the years before the Trojan origin story became the official Roman narrative about their origins, the Romans came into conflict in the Balkans with a people who were known as the Dardani. In public discourse this created the problem that the Roman army could be seen as fighting against a people who could be related to the ancestors of the Romans. The image of the historical Dardani in the 1st century BC was that of Illyrian barbarians who raided their Macedonian frontier and had to be dealt with. In this context, the name of a people known as the Moesi appeared in Roman sources. The Moesi are mentioned only in three ancient sources in the period after the death of Emperor Augustus in 14 CE. The name itself was taken from the name of the Mysians in Asia Minor. The choice seems to be related to the fact that the Trojan-era Mysians lived close to the Trojan-era Dardanians. Ovid mentions the Moesi as a people who raided the inner Balkan provinces of Romans. Strabo is the first who linked the Balkan Moesi considering them to be of the same origin as the Homeric Mysi of northwest Anatolia. Strabo constructs a story according to which Moesian presence in the Danubian area dates to the campaigns of Aelius Catus, who moved 50.000 Moesians from coastal Thrace near the Getae around 4 CE. Strabo's argumentation that the Moesi were moved in the region by Aelius Catus has been criticized for its "illogical and controversial arguments". Strabo in Geography mentions no historical events in relation to the Moesi in contrast to the historical details he reports about the Getae and the Triballi who would have been their neighbours. This is seen as more evidence that the Moesi as a people were in fact a recent construct.

As the name of the Dardani in Roman discourse became linked to the ancestors of the Romans, the actual Dardani began to be covered in Roman literature by other names. After the death of Augustus, their name in connection to the Balkans became a political problem. After the death of Augustus, the new emperor was Tiberius, his stepson and the most senior Roman general in the Balkans. As Tiberius had played a key role in the Roman conquest of the Balkans, as emperor he could not be portrayed as the conqueror of Dardanians, whose name had been constructed as the name of the mythical progenitors of the Romans. Thus, the decision to create a new name for Dardania and the Dardani was made. Despite this decision and the administrative use of the names Moesia and Moesi for the Dardani and Dardania, the original use of the name persisted by authors like Appian. The name Dardania was not used for several hundred years after this period in an administrative context. It was only recreated by Emperor Diocletian in the 3rd century CE.

=== Medieval usage ===
With the formation of the Bulgarian ethnicity in the mid-10th century, the Byzantines usually called the Bulgarians Moesi, and their lands, Moesia. Byzantine official and historian Niketas Choniates (c. 1155 – 1217) wrote that the barbarians of the Haemus region, formerly known as Moesians, were now known as Vlachs. Byzantine eastern orthodox priest and judge Demetrios Chomatenos (c. 1216 - 1236) wrote the following:

"This great father of ours and a luminary of Bulgaria was descended from the European Moesi whom the people usually know as Bulgarians. They were displaced in old times by the military force of Alexander the Great, from the situated near Brusa mount Olympus, to the Northern Ocean and the Dead Sea, and after a long time had passed, they crossed the Danube with a formidable army, and took possession of all the neighbouring provinces of Pannonia, Dalmatia, Thrace and Illyricum, and a great part of Macedonia and Thessaly."

== See also ==
- List of ancient tribes in Thrace and Dacia
- List of ancient cities in Thrace and Dacia
- Daco-Thracian

== Bibliography ==
- Cary, Max; Wilkes, John (2012). "Moesia". In Hornblower, Simon; Spawforth, Antony; Eidinow, Esther (eds.). The Oxford Classical Dictionary. OUP Oxford. p. 966. ISBN 978-0-19-954556-8.
- Gavrilović Vitas, Nadežda (2021). Ex Asia et Syria Oriental Religions in the Roman Central Balkans. Archaeopress Roman Archaeology. Vol. 78. Archaeopress Publishing LTD. ISBN 978-1-78969-914-2.
- Oreshko, Rostislav (2020). "The onager kings of Anatolia: Hartapus, Gordis, Muška and the steppe strand in early Phrygian culture" (PDF). Kadmos. 59 (1/2). De Gruyter: 77–128. doi:10.1515/kadmos-2020-0005. S2CID 235451836.
- Šašel Kos, Marjeta (2005). Appian and Illyricum. Narodni muzej Slovenije. ISBN 961616936X.
- Wilkes, J. J. (1996). "The Danubian and Balkan provinces". In Alan K. Bowman; Edward Champlin; Andrew Linto (eds.). The Cambridge Ancient History: The Augustan Empire, 43 B.C—A.D. 69. Vol. 10. Cambridge University Press. pp. 545–585. ISBN 0521264308.
- Boteva, Dilyana (2021). Mitthof, Fritz; Cenati, Chiara; Zerbini, Livio (eds.). "Society and Myths: How was the Name of Moesia Invented?". Ad Ripam Fluminis Danuvi: Papers of the 3rd International Conference on the Roman Danubian Provinces, Vienna, 11th–14th November 2015.
- Rama, Zana (2021). "Dardania in late antiquity: An overview of 4th-6th century fortification in the territory of Kosovo". Archaeologia Adriatica. 14. doi:10.15291/archeo.3392. S2CID 244293507.
- Zhivkov, Vladislav; Dimitrov, Zdravko (2023). "The Getae who were called Moesi. Changing landscape in the LT D2 / Augustan age between the Timok and Ogosta rivers (north-western Bulgaria)". In Rustoiu, Aure; Egri, Mariana (eds.). The Archaeology of Communities and Landscapes in the Carpathian Basin Interdisciplinary Perspectives. Mega Publishing House. pp. 199–204. ISBN 9786060206934.
