= Joyeuse, Ardèche =

Joyeuse Juèsa (Occitan)
- Commune
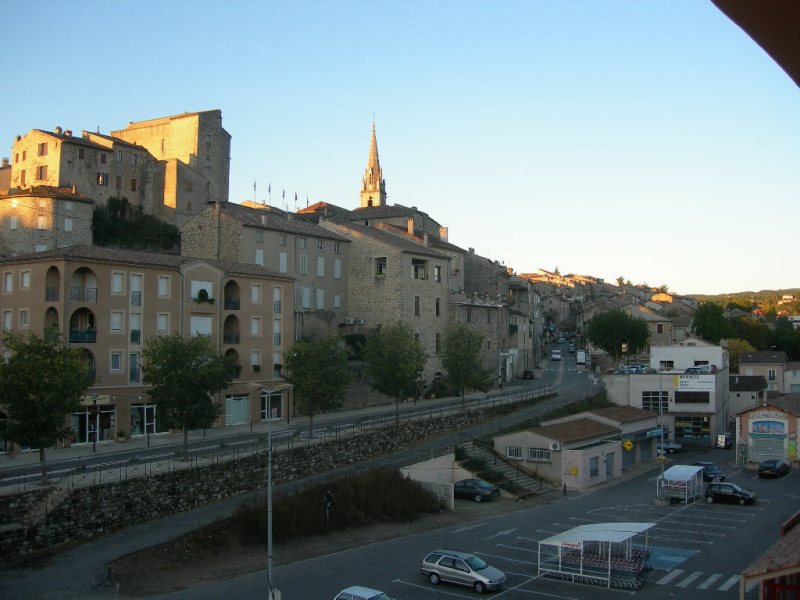
- The railway station car park and the D104 road, with the chateau and the church beyond

- Coat of arms
- Location of Joyeuse
- Location within France Location within Auvergne-Rhône-Alpes
- Coordinates: 44°28′49″N 4°14′19″E
- Country: France
- Region: Auvergne-Rhône-Alpes
- Department: Ardèche
- Arrondissement: Largentière
- Canton: Les Cévennes ardéchoises
- Intercommunality: Pays Beaume Drobie

Government
  - Mayor (2020–2026): Brigitte Pantoustier
- Area^{1}: 13.04 km^{2} (5.03 sq mi)
- Elevation: 180 m (590 ft)
- Highest elevation: 323 m (1,060 ft)
- Lowest elevation: 120 m (390 ft)
- Population (2023): 1,811
  - Density: 138.9/km^{2} (359.7/sq mi)
- Time zone: UTC+01:00 (CET)
  - Summer (DST): UTC+02:00 (CEST)
- INSEE/Postal code: 07110 /07260
- ^{1} French Land Register data, which excludes lakes, ponds, glaciers > 1 km^{2} (0.386 sq mi or 247 acres) and river estuaries.

Joyeuse (French: [ʒwajøz]; Occitan: Juèsa) is a commune in the Ardèche department. It is located in the Auvergne-Rhône-Alpes region in southern France, and is supposedly named for Charlemagne's legendary sword.

== Geography ==
Joyeuse lies in the historic region of Bas-Vivarais, in the valley of the Beaume, a tributary of the Ardèche.

== Population ==
Historical population

Year	Pop.	±% p.a.
1793	1,050	—
1800	1,074	+0.32%
1806	1,303	+3.27%
1821	1,607	+1.41%
1831	1,850	+1.42%
1836	2,280	+4.27%
1841	2,351	+0.62%
1846	2,572	+1.81%
1851	2,688	+0.89%
1856	2,686	−0.01%
1861	2,498	−1.44%
1866	2,576	+0.62%
1872	2,520	−0.37%
1876	2,235	−2.96%
1881	2,020	−2.00%
1886	1,974	−0.46%
1891	2,082	+1.07%
1896	2,062	−0.19%
1901	1,909	−1.53%

Year	Pop.	±% p.a.
1906	1,960	+0.53%
1911	1,877	−0.86%
1921	1,541	−1.95%
1926	1,654	+1.43%
1931	1,648	−0.07%
1936	1,573	−0.93%
1946	1,437	−0.90%
1954	1,251	−1.72%
1962	1,294	+0.42%
1968	1,317	+0.29%
1975	1,293	−0.26%
1982	1,368	+0.81%
1990	1,411	+0.39%
1999	1,483	+0.55%
2007	1,612	+1.05%
2012	1,678	+0.81%
2017	1,721	+0.51%
2023	1,811	+0.85%

Source: EHESS and INSEE (1968-2023)

== Personalities ==
- Marcus Jallius Bassus, Roman consul, whose tomb is near Joyeuse
- Charlemagne, founder of Joyeuse according to tradition
- Duke Anne de Joyeuse
- Cardinal François de Joyeuse
- Duchess Henriette Catherine de Joyeuse
- la Grande Mademoiselle
- François Boissel

== Sights ==
- The Château de Joyeuse is a classed as a monument historique. An earlier castle was largely destroyed and rebuilt in the 16th century. Today it serves as the mairie.
- The Oratorian college is a monument historique. It was founded by Duchess Henriette in 1617 with the permission of Pope Paul V. It served as an educational institution until the French Revolution. It is now the home of a museum dealing with the cultivation and use of the sweet chestnut, from foodstuffs to furniture.
- The church of Saint Peter, a third monument historique, dates from the eleventh century. The church was reconstructed in the 17th century.
- The hôtel de Montravel was built between the 12th and 14th centuries although the front façade dates from 1775.
- Museums include a museum of local history, the Espace historique et légendaire, and the Maison de la caricature et du dessin d'humour, a museum of caricature.

== Twin town ==
Joyeuse is twinned with Jupille and Vilassar de Dalt.

== Gallery ==
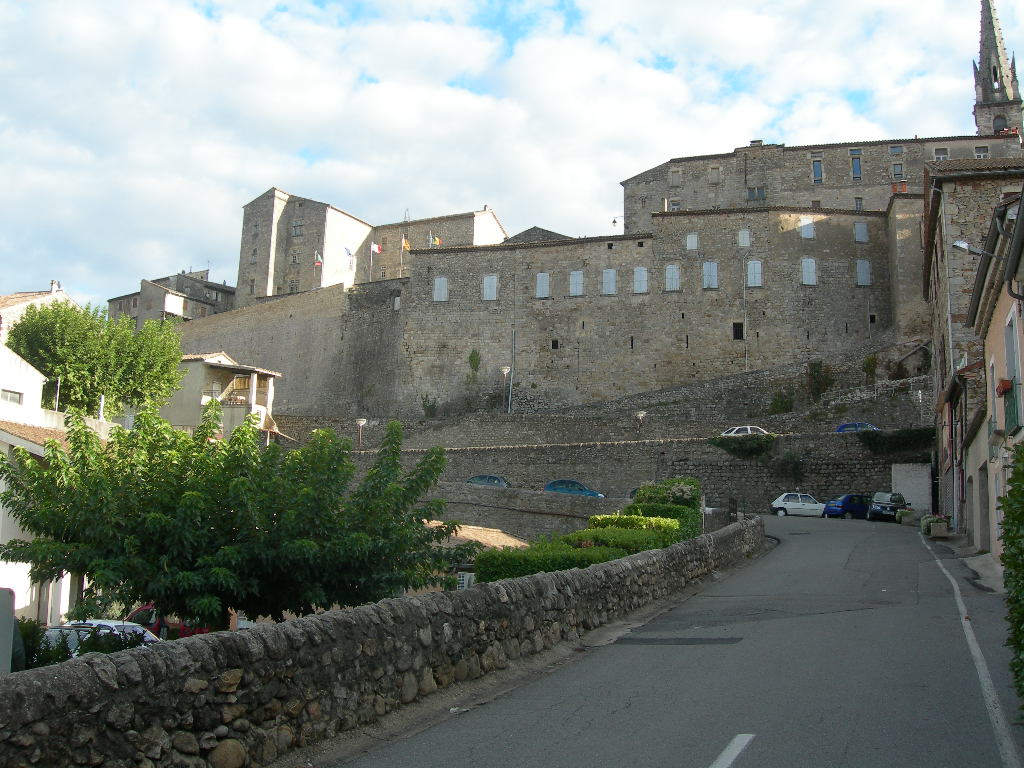
Château de Joyeuse

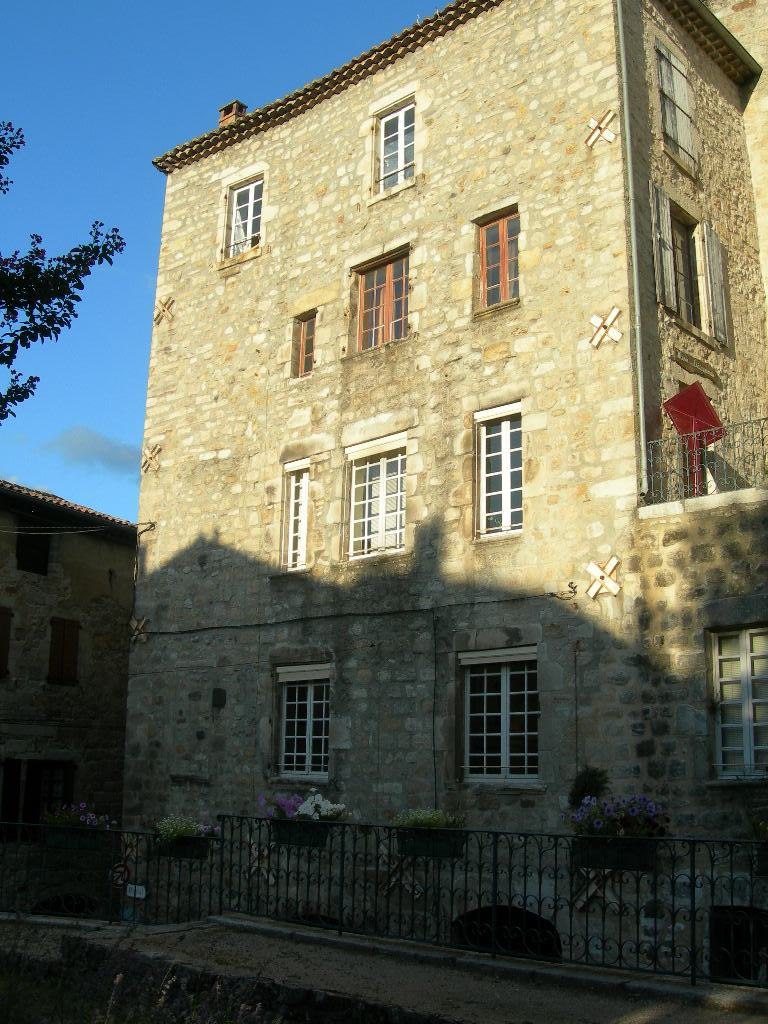
Former college of the Oratorians

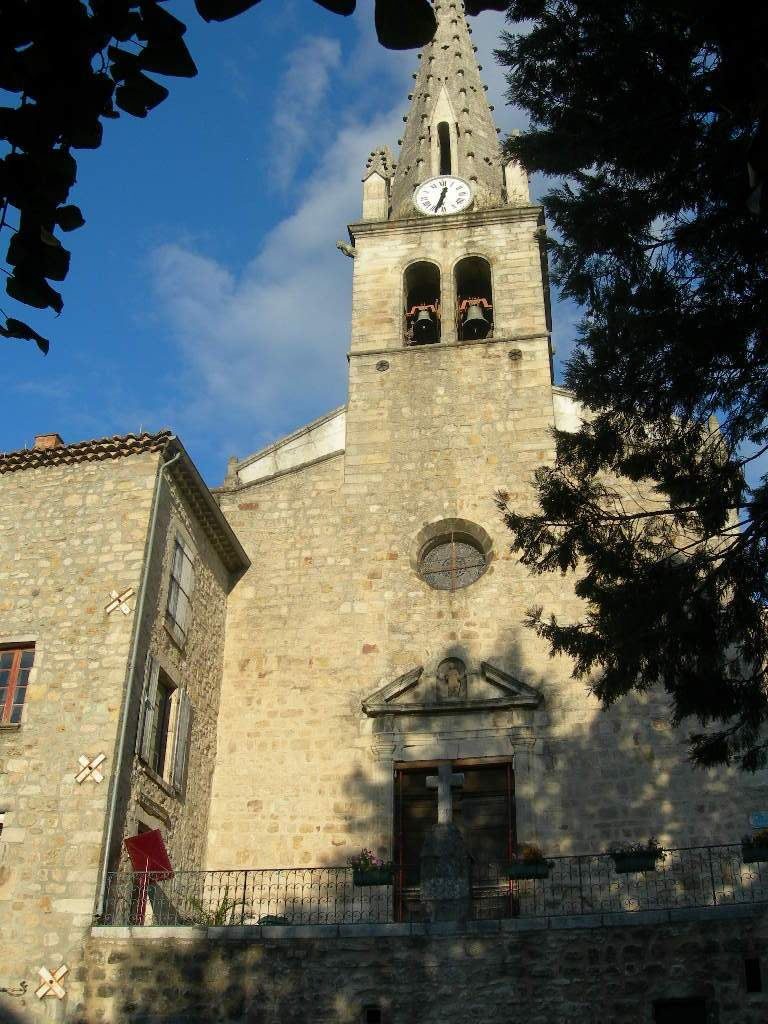
Church of Saint Peter

== See also ==
- Communes of the Ardèche department
