= Furtius =

2nd century ruler of the Germanic Quadi tribe

Furtius (flourished in 2nd century AD) was a ruler of the Quadi, a Germanic tribe, during the Marcomannic War.

Furtius is mentioned in the Historia romana of Cassius Dio. He had negotiated a peace treaty with Roman Emperor Marcus Aurelius. Since he considered the Quadi untrustworthy and because they were not fulfilling the conditions of the treaty, in particular with respect to the return of Roman prisoners of war, Marcus decided to invade the Quadi and destroy them completely. At this point the Quadi deposed Furtius and replaced him with Ariogaesus.

== Sources ==
- Cassius Dio, Historia romana, Book LXXII. 13
