= Varisci =

Roman-era Germanic people who lived north of Danube

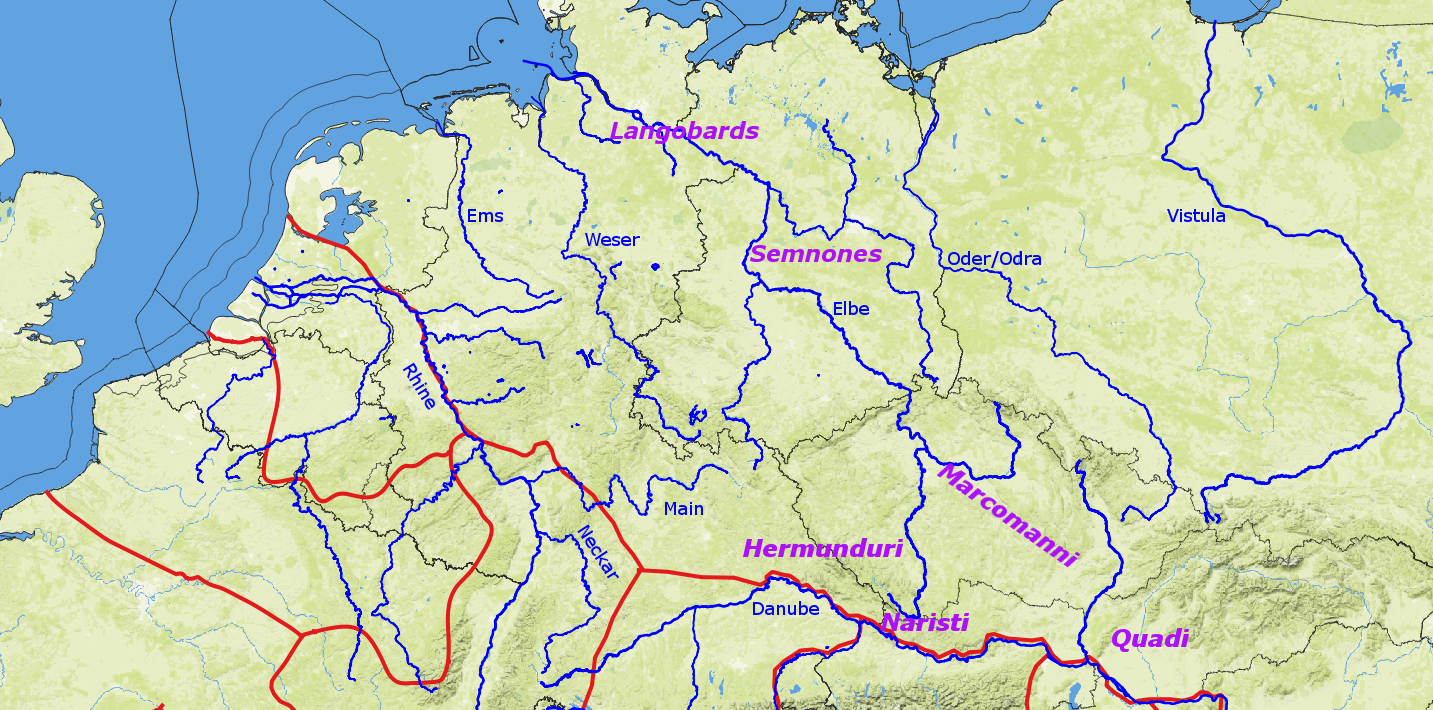
Approximate positions of some major Suebi peoples in the early 2nd century, in purple

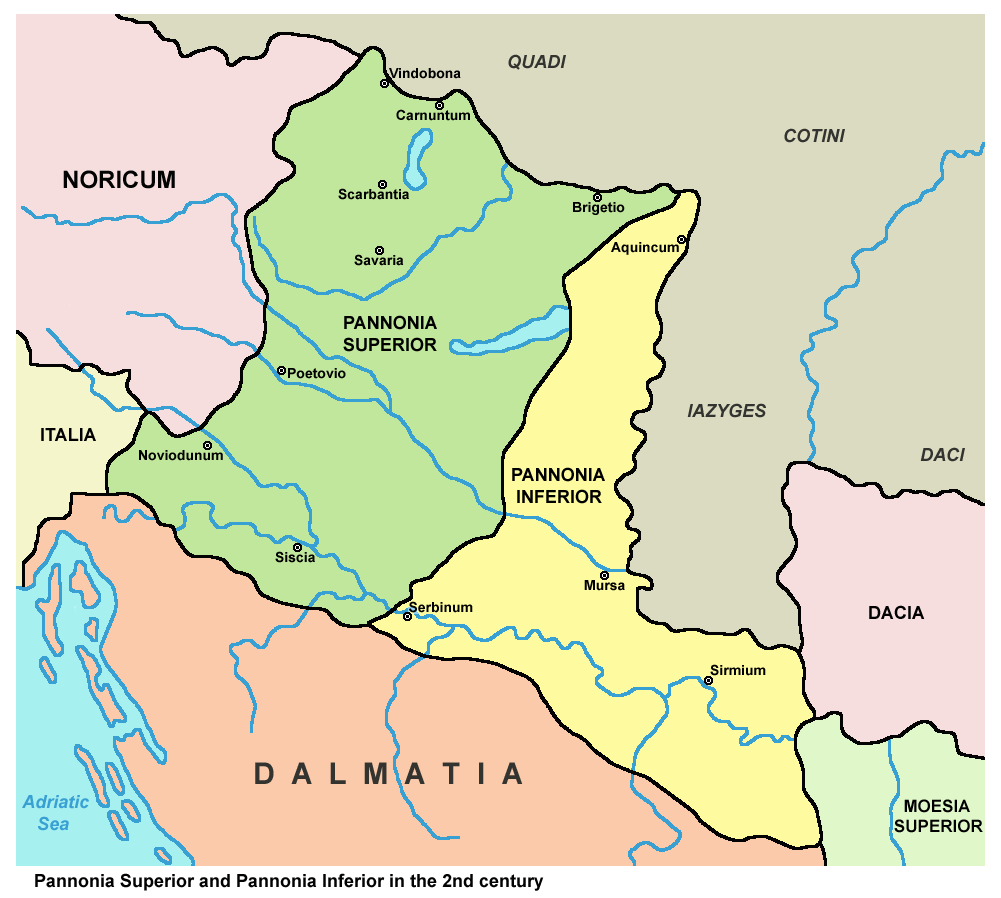
Roman Pannonia

Despite the large variations in spellings of their name the Varisci, Varisti, Naristi, or Narisci were a single Germanic people, known from several historical records from the Roman era.

Tacitus reported their location in about 100 AD as being just north of the Roman frontier on the Danube river, east of the Hermunduri, whose territory stretched from the Raetian part of the Danube to the sources of the Elbe, and west of the Marcomanni and Quadi. The Roman geographer Ptolemy described the Ouaristoi living south of the "Sudeten" Mountains and north of the "Gabreta" Forest. These sources have been interpreted in many ways, but the best records would be consistent with a location not far from the Roman province of Pannonia Superior, possibly in the area north of present day Linz.

Roman authors associated the Varisti, Hermunduri, Marcomanni and Quadi as Suebian peoples who moved into the Danube region under Marcomanni leadership, taking over from the remaining Boii still living in this part of their ancient homelands. Very likely, then, all three allies were not from that region, but moved into it from the north under pressure from the Roman invasions into Germania during the reign of Augustus.

During the Marcomannic Wars which occurred during the reign of Marcus Aurelius, the chief of the Naristi was killed by the Roman General Marcus Valerius Maximianus.

The Marcomannic Wars are chronicled and explained in Marcellinus Ammianus, although the Varisci are not mentioned there. They do find brief mention as the Varistae of the Vita Marci Antonini Philosophi (Chapter 22) of Julius Capitolinus. They were among the tribes who crossed the Danube, but are not mentioned after that.

The best guess as to their eventual fate is that they were transplanted to Italy, along with many other Danube-dwelling warrior peoples, by Marcus Aurelius, where he could watch over them.

They are the presumed prior inhabitants of a medieval district, Provincia Variscorum, the same (in presumption) as the Vogtland district of Saxony in Germany.

== See also ==
- List of ancient Germanic peoples
- Noricum
