= Ariogaesus =

2nd century ruler of the Germanic Quadi tribe

Ariogaesus (flourished in 2nd century AD) was a ruler of the Quadi, a Germanic tribe, during the Marcomannic War.

Ariogaesus is mentioned in the Historia romana of Cassius Dio. Before Ariogaesus became the ruler of his people, their king Furtius had made a peace treaty with Marcus Aurelius. When the Quadi deposed Furtius they elected Ariogaesus as their king, but Marcus Aurelius refused to renew the treaty and recognize their new ruler. In turn the Quadi declined to hand over Roman prisoners of war. As a result, Marcus decided to completely destroy the Quadi. He promised a thousand gold pieces to anyone who could bring him Ariogaesus alive, and five hundred to those who could kill him and deliver his head. When Ariogaesus eventually was captured however, Marcus merely sent him to Alexandria.

== Sources ==
- Cassius Dio, Historia romana, Books LXXII. 13-14
