= Pipara =

Pipara or Pipa (3rd century AD) was the daughter of Attalus (Marcomanni), king of the Marcomanni in present-day Bohemia. She is notable for having a love affair with the emperor Gallienus, having been given to him by Attalus as a tool of appeasement. Attalus' invasion was one of many foreign invasions, contributing to the crisis of the third century.

In 254 AD, the Marcomanni invaded Pannonia. Loath to fight the invaders, Gallienus forged a treaty with Attalus, concluded possibly in 258 AD. The treaty stipulated that part of Pannonia superior be ceded to the Marcomanni, who were in turn trusted to prevent further incursions across the border. The emperor was given Pipara or Pipa, as a hostage or concubine. Whereas the Historia Augusta claims it was a genuine love they felt for each other, Aurelius Victor speaks of a shameful love affair.
