= Battle of Carnuntum =

Battle during the Marcomannic Wars (170)

- Part of Marcomannic Wars
Date	Spring 170 AD
Location	near Carnuntum, Pannonia Superior, Roman Empire (modern-day Austria)
Result	Germanic victory

Belligerents
Marcomanni; Quadi	Roman Empire

Commanders and leaders
Ballomar	Marcus Aurelius

Strength
Unknown	Unknown

Casualties and losses
Unknown	About 20,000 killed

The Battle of Carnuntum took place in 170 AD during the Marcomannic Wars. In the spring of 170 AD swarms of Germanic warrior bands attacked Roman provinces along the Danube River. In furtherance of this endeavor, and for mutual protection, the king of the Marcomanni, Ballomar, had allied with the Quadi tribe. Roman Emperor Marcus Aurelius with his son-in-law and chief military adviser Tiberius Claudius Pompeianus crossed the Danube River to drive back the raiders. The Romans and Germans met outside Carnuntum in Upper Pannonia, which was the headquarters for the Legio XIV Gemina. The Roman army was inexperienced and outmatched, and the ensuing battle was a disaster for the Romans. Although the legions fought hard and bravely, they were no match for the Germanic warriors. 20,000 Romans were killed. Following this victory the Germans besieged Aquileia and sacked Opitergium.

== Historiography ==
There is only one ancient source for the battle and that is Lucian in his book Alexander which is either a polemic or a witty satire aimed at Alexander of Abonoteichus, depending on the point of view. The description of 20,000 Roman dead might have been dismissed by historians, were it not for the fact that other historical information in that work is supported by independent ancient authors and by epigraphical and numismatic evidence.

The chronology of events of the Marcomannic Wars has a number of problems, but scholars now agree that these events took place in the Spring of 170 A.D.
