= Marcus Iallius Bassus =

2nd century Roman senator, governor and legate

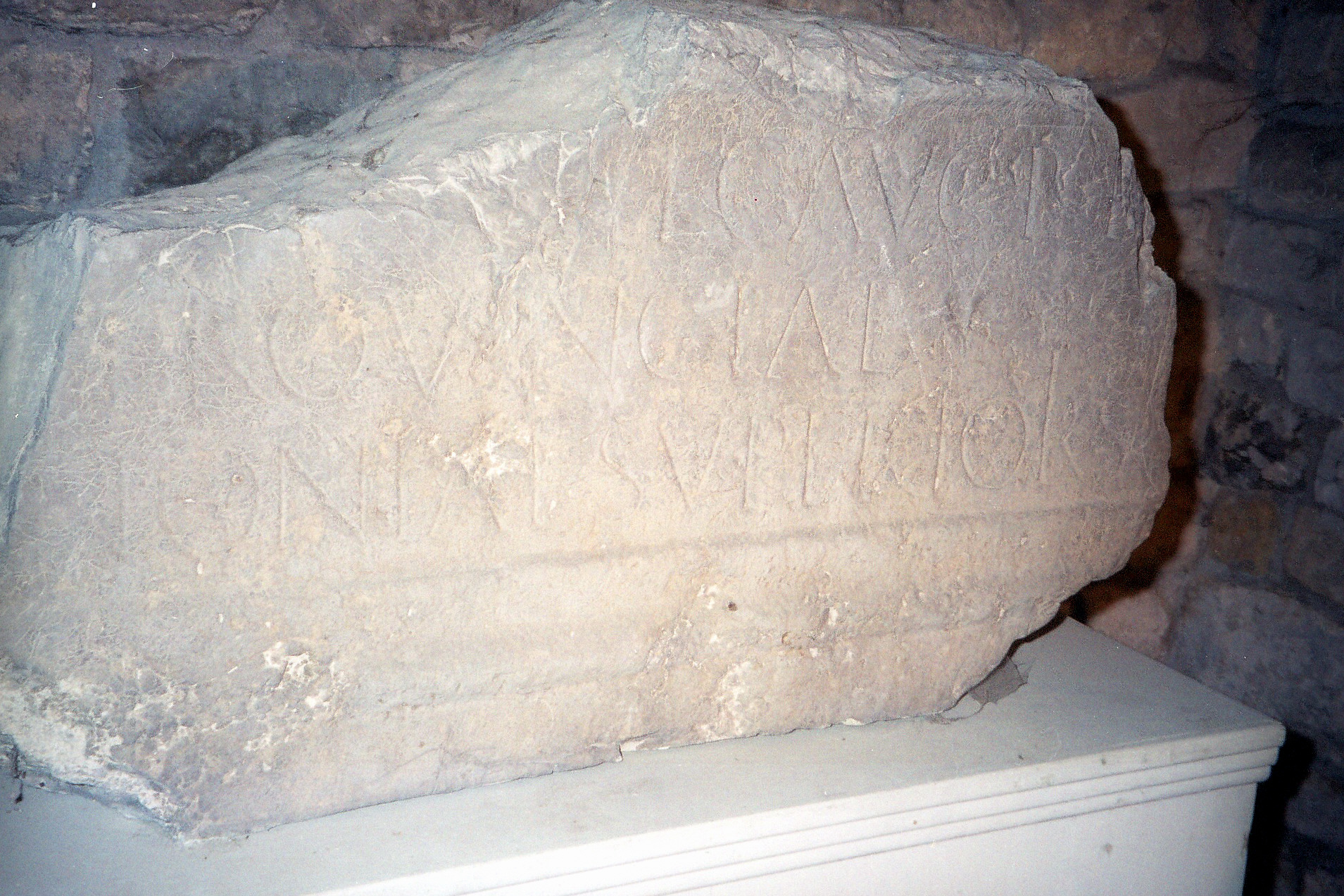
Fragment of an inscription detailing the cursus honorum of Marcus Iallius Bassus.

Marcus Iallius or Jallius Bassus was a Roman senator, general, and literary figure who held several offices in the imperial service during the mid-second century AD. He was suffect consul around the year 159. Bassus is known primarily from inscriptions. His full name was Marcus Iallius Bassus Fabius Valerianus.

Bassus was from Alba Helviorum (modern Joyeuse, Ardèche), where two inscriptions record his cursus honorum. These inscriptions give his father's name as Marcus; he might be the Marcus Iallius Bassus who was buried at Alba Helviorum. He was probably closely related to the Quintus Iallius Bassus who was consul in 158.

Bassus' senatorial career began with his adlection inter tribunicios, that is as having held the office of plebeian tribune. After his accession to praetor, he was commissioned legatus legionis, or commander of a legion, but its name was not preserved on either inscription; Géza Alföldy dates his command from around the year 153 to 156, and suggests that the unknown legion could be either Legio I Adiutrix or Legio X Gemina. Then Bassus was governor of Pannonia Inferior, which Alföldy dates from around the year 156 to 159. His consulate followed.

His senatorial career as an ex-consul encompasses more than the average number of offices. First Bassus held the post of curator operum locorumque publicorum et aedium sacrum, which Alföldy dates to the year 161. Then he was appointed governor of Moesia Inferior; Alföldy dates his office to the year 162. Bassus was then made one of the Emperor Marcus Aurelius' comites, an inner circle of advisors, during the Parthian War. Upon the resolution of that conflict, Bassus was appointed governor of Pannonia Superior; Alföldy dates his tenure in that province from around 166 to 169.

== See also ==
- Iallia gens
