= Aelius Catus =

Early 1st century Roman military commander

- Military career
- Allegiance: Roman
- Rank: Commander

Aelius Catus was a Roman commander near the Danube who, according to Strabo's geography, transplanted 50,000 Getae from what is now Muntenia in Romania far to the south of Danube, in Moesia.

The Roman Empire had reached the Danube as early as 14 AD, when the commander Aelius Catus conducted an expedition beyond the river in order to keep away the restless Dacians and their new allies, the Sarmatians. But the legions deployed their troops only up to Durostorum, as modern northern Dobruja was left to the forces of the kings of the Sapaei, the allies of the Romans, helped by the forces commanded by a Praefectus orae maritimae (commander of the seashore).

There has been some debate both on the identity of Aelius Catus and on the date of this action. Some historians identified Aelius Catus with Sextus Aelius Catus, a consul in 4 AD.

== See also ==
- Capidava
- Dacia
- Moesia
- Scythia Minor
- Domitian's Dacian War, 86–87 AD
- Trajan's Dacian Wars, 101–102 AD and 105–106 AD

== Notes ==
=== Ancient ===
- Strabo, Geographica

=== Modern ===
- Florescu, Radu; Manea, Florentina. Oberländer-Târnoveanu, Irina; Bor, Corina (eds.). "Capidava". Bucharest, Romania: Institute for Cultural Memory (Institutul de Memorie Culturală) - cIMeC. Archived from the original on 31 October 2010.
- Strabo, Geography, VII C
- Dicționar de istorie veche a României ("Dictionary of ancient Romanian history") (1976) Editura Științifică și Enciclopedică, pp. 536–537
