= Moesia =

Province of the Roman Empire

Moesia Moesia (Latin) Μοισίας
- Province of the Roman Empire
- AD 6–AD 87
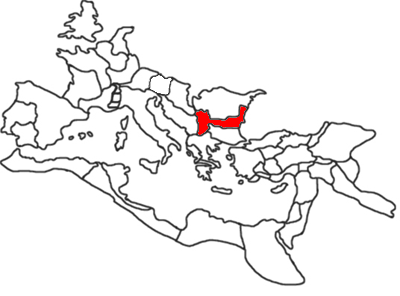
- Capital: Tomis
- Demonym: Moesian
- Historical era: Late antiquity
  - Conquered in c. 28 BC, it was a military district.: c. AD 6
  - Division into Upper Moesia, Dacia, and Lower Moesia: c. AD 87
Succeeded by
Diocese of Moesiae
Moesia Inferior
Moesia Superior
- Today part of: Romania, Bulgaria, Serbia, Ukraine

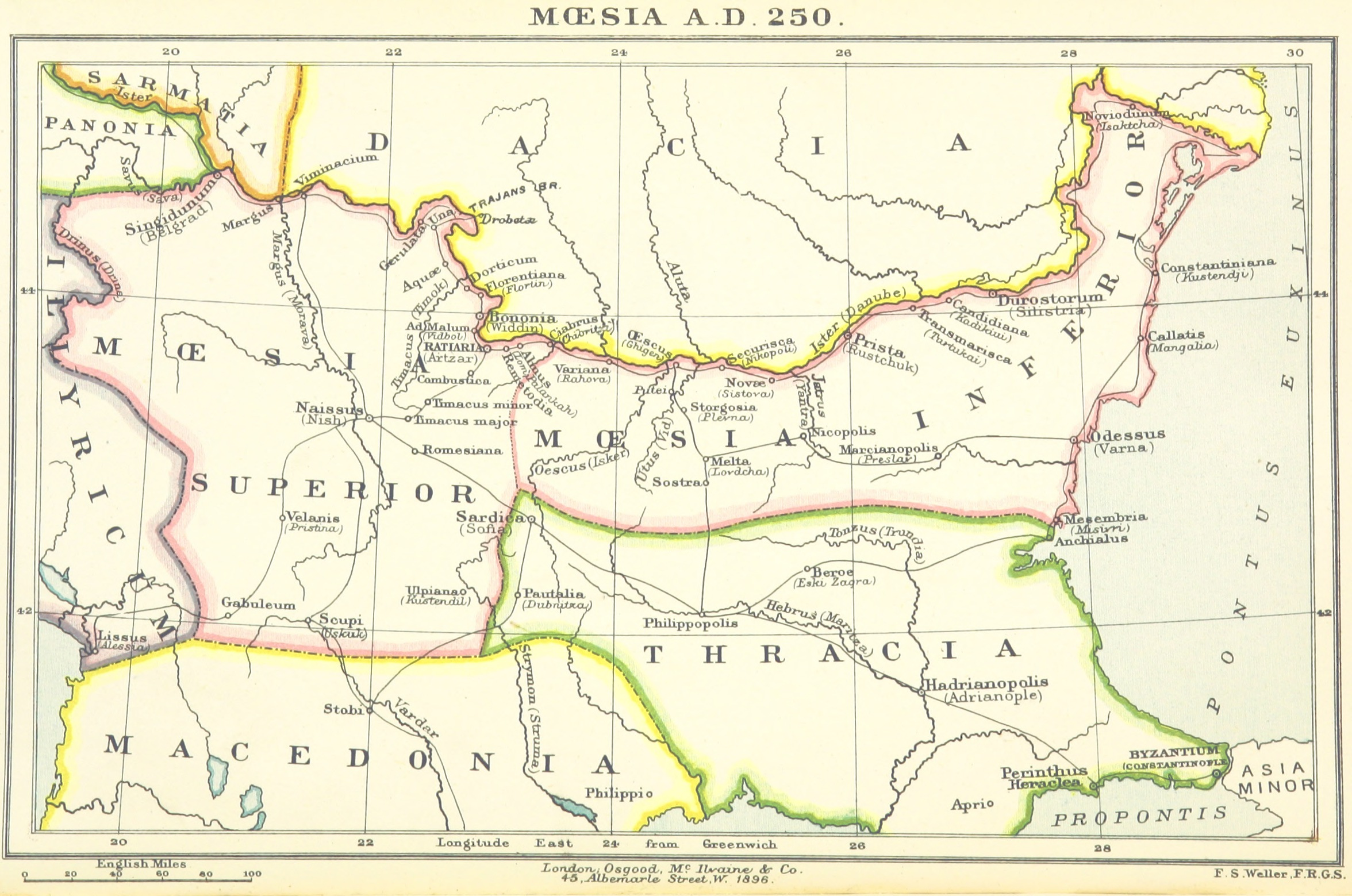
Roman Moesia in AD 250, divided into the provinces of Moesia Superior to the west and Moesia Inferior to the east

Moesia (/ˈmiːʃə, -siə, -ʒə/; Latin: Moesia; Greek: Μοισία, romanized: Moisía) was a Roman province situated in the Haemus Peninsula, south of the Danube River. Created after the Danubian-Hæmus conquest during the reign of Augustus, Moesia included most of the territory of modern eastern Serbia, Kosovo, north-eastern Albania, northern parts of North Macedonia (Moesia Superior), Northern Bulgaria, Northern Dobruja and small parts of Southern Ukraine (Moesia Inferior).

== Extension ==
The Roman province of Moesia (both Moesia Superior and Moesia Inferior) was bounded to the south by the Haemus (Balkan Mountains) and Scardus (Šar) mountains, to the west by the Drinus (Drina) river, on the north by the Donaris (Danube) and on the east by the Euxine (Black Sea).

The province was later divided into Moesia Superior and Moesia Inferior, with the river Ciabrus (modern Tsibritsa) forming the boundary between them.

== Name ==
A Paleo-Balkan tribe known as the "Moesi" never actually existed in the Danube area, it was a Roman invention of the Augustan era. The Moesi do not appear in ancient sources before Augustus's death in AD 14 and are mentioned only by three authors dealing with the Roman warfare in the region and the ethnonymic situation between mid-1st century BC and mid-1st century AD: Ovid, Strabo and Livy. The ethnonym was transplanted from Asia Minor Mysians to the Balkans by the Romans as a replacement of the name of the Dardani who lived in the territory that later became the province of Moesia Superior. This decision in Roman literature is linked to the appropriation of the name Dardani in official Roman ideological discourse as Trojan ancestors of the Romans and the creation of a fictive name for the actual Dardani who were seen as barbarians and antagonists of Rome in antiquity. This new fictive Augustan terminology was illogically and controversially argumented by Strabo as the result of Aelius Catus's displacement of 50,000 Getae from the north to the south of the Danube, who settled areas in the north-eastern parts of the later province of Moesia Superior, thereafter being called "Moesi".

The Latin name Moesia was given first to the province of Moesia Superior and expanded into Moesia Inferior along the Danube. After the recreation of Dardania, Moesia referred to Moesia Prima, the northern part of Moesia Superior. A civitas of the Moesi which was reorganized as a Roman colony was located around Ratiaria in the first century AD.

== History ==
=== Roman conquest ===
The territory that under Roman rule became known as the province of Moesia was inhabited chiefly by Thracian, Dacian, Illyrian, and Thraco-Illyrian peoples.

Before Roman rule, the territory that later became the province of Moesia Superior was dominated by the Dardani, who had constituted their own kingdom. The Dardani had resumed their enmity against Macedon since at least 230 BC. In the Roman-Macedonian Wars the Dardani sided with Rome and were among the biggest threats to Macedon. After the defeat of Macedon in the Third Macedonian War, the fragile Dardanian-Roman alliance weakened, in particular after the Senate's decision not to return to the Dardanian kingdom the territory that had been previously conquered by the Macedonians, notably Paeonia, which the Dardani claimed as their own territory. The Senate only recognized the Dardani the right to trade salt. Thereafter, from sworn enemies of Macedonia, the Dardani became enemies of Rome. Rome started its dominion over the Balkans establishing the protectorates of Illyricum and Macedonia after the Roman-Illyrian wars and Roman-Macedonian Wars. Roman offensives against the Dardani in the years 97 BC, 85 BC, and 77/6 BC were repelled. But in 75–73 BC the Dardani had to face terrible conflicts against Rome, known as Bellum Dardanicum. During the Mithridatic Wars (88–63 BC) between the Roman Republic and Mithridates VI of Pontus, the Dardani, Eneti, and Sintians were raiding Roman Macedonia; afer his arrival, the consul Sulla attacked them, reportedly devastating their territory. The Dardani continued to fight against Rome and its proconsuls, and were finally defeated probably by Marcus Antonius in 39 BC or by Marcus Licinius Crassus in 29/8 BC. The Romans created the province of Moesia also including the territory of Dardania. After the Roman emperor Domitian divided the province of Moesia into Moesia Superior and Moesia Inferior in AD 86, the Dardani were located in southern Moesia Superior. Emperor Diocletian later (284) made Dardania into a separate province with its capital at Naissus (Niš). The Romans found an ancient formed economy in Dardania, based on agriculture and animal husbandry, mining and metallurgy, in different handicrafts and in trade. The Romans focused especially in exploitation of mines, same as in other provinces, and in road construction.

Parts of the later province of Moesia belonged, before the Roman rule, to the polity of Burebista, a Getae (Dacian) king who established his rule over a large part of the northern Balkans between 82 BC and 44 BC. He led raids for plunder and conquest across Central and Southeastern Europe, subjugating most of the neighbouring tribes. After his assassination in a palace intrigue, the empire was divided into several smaller states. In 74 BC, C. Scribonius Curio, proconsul of Macedonia, took an army as far as the Danube and chased the Geto-Dacians to the border of their remote country. The expansion of the Dacians on the middle and lower reaches of the Danube worried the Romans and destruction of Dacian power became one of Julius Caesar's key political objectives, who made plans to launch an offensive from Macedonia in about 44 BC.

Once Augustus had established himself as sole ruler of the Roman state in 30 BC after the naval Battle of Actium in 31 BC, he took up Caesar's project and aimed to advance the empire's south-eastern European border from Macedonia to the line of the Danube. The main objective was to increase strategic depth between the border and Italy and also to provide a major river supply route between the Roman armies in the region. The lower Danube was given priority over the upper Danube and required the annexation of Moesia. It was therefore necessary to conquer the tribes who dwelt south of the Danube namely (from west to east) the Triballi, Moesi, Getae and the Bastarnae who had recently subjugated the Triballi, and with their capital at Oescus. Augustus also wanted to avenge the defeat of Gaius Antonius Hybrida at Histria 32 years before and to recover the lost military standards held in the powerful fortress of Genucla.

Marcus Licinius Crassus, grandson of Crassus the triumvir was appointed for the task. He was an experienced general at 33 years of age, and proconsul of Macedonia from 29 BC. After a successful campaign against the Moesi, he drove the Bastarnae back toward the Danube and finally defeated them in pitched battle, killing their King Deldo in single combat. Augustus formally proclaimed this victory in 27 BC in Rome but blocked Cassius' entitlement to the Spolia opima and use of the term imperator apparently in favour of his own prestige.

Moesia was split off as a separate military command some time before 10 BC.

As a result of the Dacians constant looting that occurred whenever the Danube froze, Augustus decided to send against them some of his proven generals such as Sextus Aelius Catus and Gnaeus Cornelius Lentulus Augur (sometime between AD 1–11). Lentulus pushed them back across the Danube and placed numerous garrisons on the right bank of the river to defend against possible and future incursions. These became the Moesian Limes frontier defensive system that was developed further later.

=== Roman Province ===
Borders of the Roman provinces of Moesia Superior and Dardania

The region, however, was not organised as a province until the last years of Augustus' reign; in AD 6, mention is made of its governor, Caecina Severus. As a province, Moesia was under an imperial consular legate (who probably also had control of Achaea and Macedonia). In AD 15 complaints about the corruption of the governors of Macedonia and Achaia led Tiberius to put these provinces under the control of the governor of Moesia.

In AD 86 the Dacian king Duras attacked Moesia after which the Roman emperor Domitian personally arrived in Moesia and reorganised it in 87 into two provinces, divided by the river Cebrus (Ciabrus): to the west Moesia Superior (meaning upriver) and to the east Moesia Inferior or Ripa Thracia (from the Danube river's mouth and then upstream). Each was governed by an imperial consular legate and a procurator.

From Moesia Domitian began planning future campaigns into Dacia and Domitian's Dacian War started by ordering General Cornelius Fuscus to attack who, in the summer of 87, led five or six legions across the Danube. The war ended without a decisive outcome and Decebalus, the Dacian King, later brazenly flouted the terms of the peace (AD 89) which had been agreed on.

=== Dacian Wars ===
Trajan's Dacian Wars (AD 101–102, AD 105–106) were two military campaigns fought between the Roman Empire and Dacia during Emperor Trajan's rule. The conflicts were triggered by the constant Dacian threat on Moesia and also by the increasing need for resources of the economy of the Empire.

Starting with AD 85, Dacia was unified under King Decebalus. Following an incursion into Moesia, which resulted in the death of its governor, Gaius Oppius Sabinus, a series of conflicts between the Romans and Dacians ensued. Although the Romans gained a major strategic victory at Tapae in AD 88, Emperor Domitian offered the Dacians favourable terms, in exchange for which Roman suzerainty was recognised. However, Emperor Trajan restarted the conflicts in 101–102 and then again in 105–106, which ended with the annexation of most of Dacia and its reorganisation as a Roman Province.

=== Gothic raids ===
Gothic invasions of 250–251

The first incursion in Moesia that can be attributed to Goths is by the Costoboci in 170 in the Marcomannic Wars when they destroyed Tropaeum Traiani.

In 238 the Carpi sacked Histria and Tropaeum Traiani. Afterwards Moesia was frequently invaded or raided by the Dacian Carpi, and the East Germanic tribes of the Goths.

In the Gothic War (248–253), the Gothic king Cniva captured the city of Philippopolis and then inflicted a devastating defeat upon the Romans at the Battle of Abrittus, in which the Roman Emperor Decius was killed, one of the most disastrous defeats in the history of the Roman army.

=== Retreat from Dacia ===
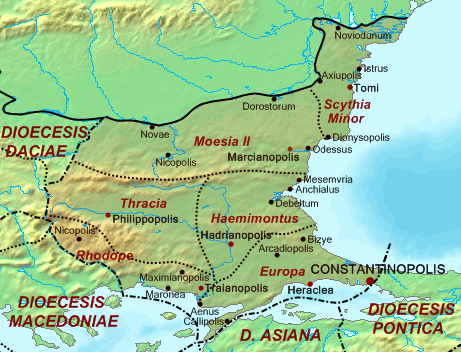
Provinces in AD 400

After the abandonment of Roman Dacia to the Goths by Aurelian (270–275) and the transfer of the Roman citizens from the former province to the south of the Danube, the central portion of Moesia took the name of Dacia Aureliana (later divided into Dacia Ripensis and Dacia Mediterranea).

During administrative reforms of Emperor Diocletian (284–305), both of the Moesian provinces were reorganised. Moesia Superior was divided in two, northern part forming the province of Moesia Prima including cities Viminacium and Singidunum, while the southern part was organised as the new province of Dardania with cities Scupi and Ulpiana. At the same time, Moesia Inferior was divided into Moesia Secunda and Scythia Minor.

The Moesian provinces and the northern Balkans in Late Antiquity

As a frontier province, Moesia was strengthened by stations and forts erected along the southern bank of the Danube, and a wall was built from Axiopolis to Tomis as a protection against the Scythians and Sarmatians. The garrison of Moesia Secunda included Legio I Italica and Legio XI Claudia, as well as auxiliary infantry units, cavalry units, and river flotillas.

Hard-pressed by the Huns, the Goths again crossed the Danube during the reign of Valens (376) and with his permission settled in Moesia. After they settled, quarrels soon took place, and the Goths under Fritigern defeated Valens in a great battle near Adrianople. These Goths are known as Moeso-Goths, for whom Ulfilas made the Gothic translation of the Bible.

=== Late Empire ===
The Slavs allied with the Avars invaded and destroyed much of Moesia in 583–587 in the Avar–Byzantine wars. Moesia was settled by Slavs during the 7th century. Bulgars, arriving from Old Great Bulgaria, conquered Lower Moesia by the end of the 7th century. During the 8th century the Byzantine Empire lost also Upper Moesian territory to the First Bulgarian Empire.. The region would return to Byzantine control under Basil II in 1018 and would last until the formation of the Second Bulgarian Empire in 1185.

== See also ==
- Diocese of Moesia
- Dacia Aureliana
- List of ancient cities in Thrace and Dacia
- List of Roman governors of Moesia
- List of Roman governors of Lower Moesia
- List of Roman governors of Upper Moesia
- Inscriptions of Upper Moesia
- Moesogoths
- Margus (city)

== Bibliography ==
- Alaj, Premtim (2019). Les habitats de l'Age du fer sur le territoire de l'actuel Kosovo (PhD thesis). Université de Lyon.
- Boteva, Dilyana (2021). Mitthof, Fritz; Cenati, Chiara; Zerbini, Livio (eds.). "Society and Myths: How was the Name of Moesia Invented?". Ad Ripam Fluminis Danuvi: Papers of the 3rd International Conference on the Roman Danubian Provinces, Vienna, 11th–14th November 2015.
- Ferri, Naser (2021). "L'odierno Kosovo Durante Il IIo secolo dopo Cristo". In Domagoj Tončinić, Livio Zerbini (ed.). Traian and the Danubian Provinces. The political, economic and religious life in the Danubian Provinces: Proceedings of the 4th International Conference on the Roman Danubian Provinces, Zagreb, 15th - 17th November 2017. FF press. pp. 231–234. doi:10.17234/9789533790367. ISBN 978-953-379-036-7.
- Matijašić, Ivan (2011). ""Shrieking like Illyrians": Historical geography and the Greek perspective of the Illyrian world in the 5th century BC". Arheološki Vestnik. 62. Research Centre of the Slovenian Academy of Sciences and Arts: 289–316.
- Petrović, Vladimir P. (2019). Les voies et agglomérations romaines au cœur des Balkans: Le cas de la Serbie. Scripta Antiqua. Ausonius Éditions. ISBN 9782356133243.
- Shukriu, Edi (2008). "Prehistory and Antique History of Kosova" (PDF). Thesis Kosova. 1.
- Wilkes, John (1996) [1992]. The Illyrians. Wiley. ISBN 978-0-631-19807-9.
- Wilkes, John (2012). "Dardani". In Hornblower, Simon; Spawforth, Antony; Eidinow, Esther (eds.). The Oxford Classical Dictionary. OUP Oxford. p. 414. ISBN 978-0-19-954556-8.
- Zhivkov, Vladislav; Dimitrov, Zdravko (2023). "The Getae who were called Moesi. Changing landscape in the LT D2 / Augustan age between the Timok and Ogosta rivers (north-western Bulgaria)". In Rustoiu, Aure; Egri, Mariana (eds.). The Archaeology of Communities and Landscapes in the Carpathian Basin Interdisciplinary Perspectives. Mega Publishing House. pp. 199–204. ISBN 9786060206934.
