= List of Roman governors of Germania Inferior =

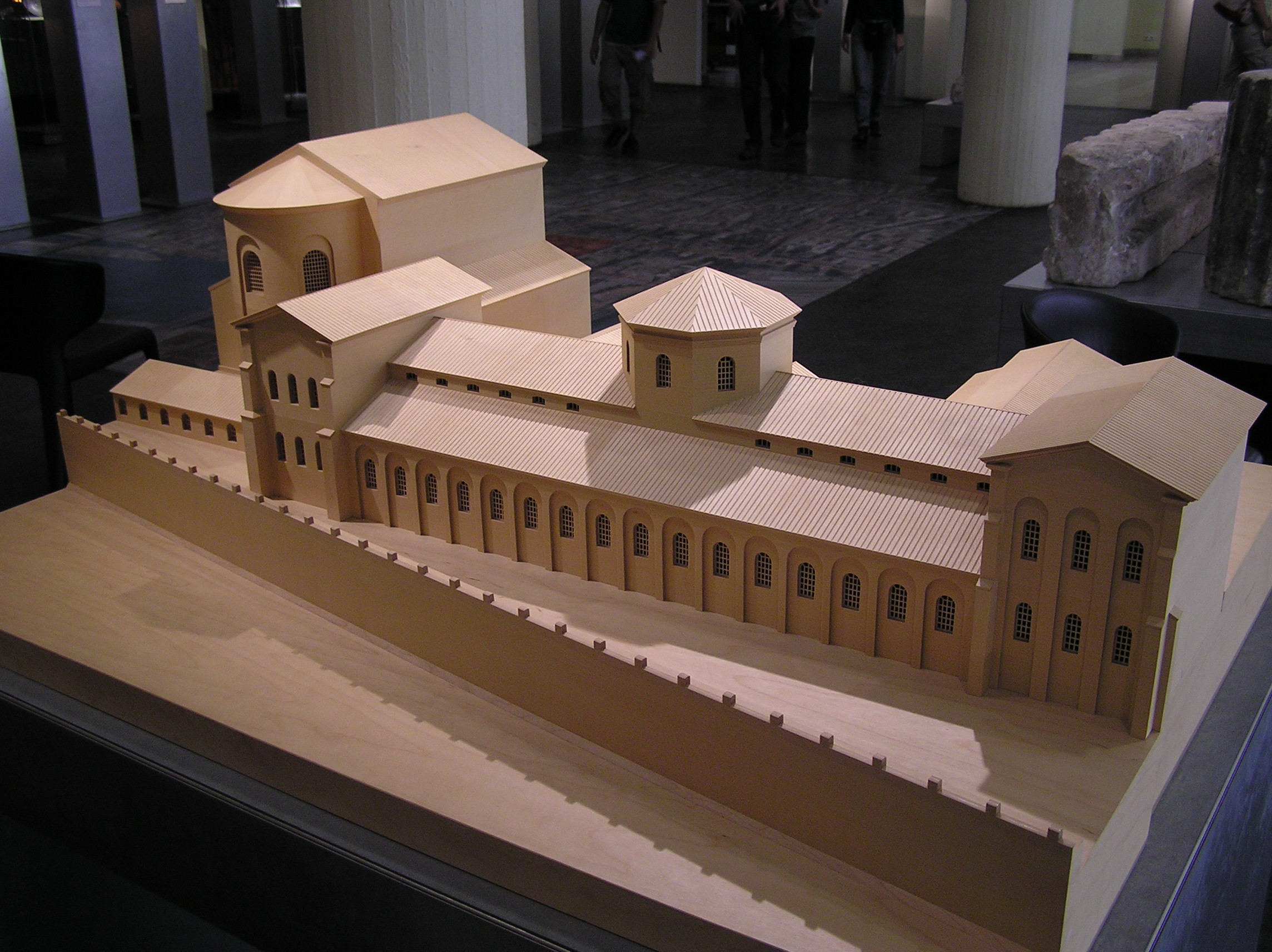
Reconstructed model of the Praetorium, the governors' seat; model on display at Cologne Archaeological Zone

This is a list of Roman governors of Germania Inferior (and Germania Secunda from 395 until the deposition of Romulus Augustulus in 476). Capital and largest city of Germania Inferior was Colonia Claudia Ara Agrippinensium (CCAA), modern-day Cologne.

== Governors during the Principate ==
=== BC 27 – AD 68: Julio-Claudian dynasty ===
- 12–9 BC: Nero Claudius Drusus
- 9–8 BC: Tiberius
- 4–1 BC: Lucius Domitius Ahenobarbus
- AD 1–4: Marcus Vinicius
- AD 4–6: Tiberius (again)
- AD 7–9: Publius Quinctilius Varus
- AD 9–11: Tiberius (again)
- AD 12–14: Germanicus Caesar
- AD 14–16: Aulus Caecina Severus
- AD 21: Gaius Silius
- AD 21: Gaius Visellius Varro
- AD 28–34: Lucius Apronius
- AD 34–39: unknown
- AD 40–41: Aulus Gabinius Secundus
- AD 46–47: Quintus Sanquinius Maximus
- AD 47–51: Gnaeus Domitius Corbulo
- AD 51–54: unknown
- AD 54–58: Pompeius Paullinus
- AD 58–60: Lucius Duvius Avitus
- AD 63–67: Publius Sulpicius Scribonius Rufus
- AD 67–68: Gaius Fonteius Capito
- AD 68–69: Aulus Vitellius Germanicus

=== AD 69–96: Year of the Four Emperors and Flavian dynasty ===
- AD 69–70: Gaius Dillius Vocula (?)
- AD 70–71: Quintus Petillius Cerialis
- AD 71–73: Aulus Marius Celsus
- AD 73–78: Lucius Acilius Strabo
- AD 78: Gaius Rutilius Gallicus
- AD 78–80: Decimus Iunius Novius Priscus
- AD 80–83: Sextus Julius Frontinus (?)
- AD 87–89: Aulus Bucius Lappius Maximus
- AD 91–96: Marcus Ulpius Trajanus

=== AD 96–192: Nervan-Antonian dynasty ===
- AD 96–97: Marcus Ulpius Trajanus
- AD 97: Titus Vestricius Spurinna (?)
- AD 97–98: Lucius Licinius Sura
- AD 98–99: Lucius Neratius Priscus
- AD 99–100: unknown
- AD 101–102: Quintus Acutius Nerva
- AD 103–116: unknown
- AD 119-122: Aulus Platorius Nepos Manilianus Gaius Licinius Pollio
- AD 122–129: unknown
- AD 127: Lucius Coelius Rufus
- AD 130–13?: Granius [Fabianus] Grattius [Cerealis?] Geminius
- AD 136–138: Quintus Lollius Urbicus
- AD 140–142: unknown
- AD 142–150: Gaius Julius Severus
- AD 150–151: Publius Septimius Aper (?)
- AD 151–152: Lucius Octavius Cornelius Salvius Iulianus Aemillianus
- AD 152–158: Gnaeus Julius Verus
- AD 158: Sextus Calpurnius Agricola (?)
- AD 158–160: Tiberius Claudius Julianus
- AD 15?–161: Salvius Julianus (?)
- AD 161–16?: Gaius Septimius Severus
- AD 170–17?: Quintus Antistius Adventus
- AD 17?–180: Junius Macr[er] (?)
- AD 180–185: Marcus Didius Julianus
- AD 18?–192: Gaius Allius Fuscus

=== AD 193–235: Year of the Five Emperors & Severan dynasty ===
- AD 193–197: Virius Lupus
- AD 197–19?: Gaius Valerius Pudens
- AD 199–20?: Novius Priscus
- AD 201–204: Marius Maximus Perpetuus Aurelianus
- AD 205: Quintus Venidius Rufus
- AD 20?–20?: Quintus Tarquitius Catulus
- AD 206–210: Gnaeus Fulvius Maximus Centumalus
- AD 211–212: Lucius Lucceius Martinus
- AD 212–21?: Marcius Claudius Agrippa
- AD 216–21?: Marcus Valerius Senecio
- AD 222–22?: Flavius Aper Commodianus
- AD 230–231: Clodius Aurelius Saturninus
- AD 231: Flavius Janus
- AD 23?–235: Gaius Messius Quintus Decius

=== AD 235–285: Emperors during the Crisis of the Third Century ===
- AD 23?–23?: Iasdius Domitianus (?)
- AD 233–238: Gaius Furius Sabinus Aquila Timesitheus
- AD 238–24?: Lucius Domitius Gallicanus Papinianus
- AD 25?: Quintus Tarquinius Catulus
- AD 259–260: Marcus Cassianus Postumus
- AD 260–274: (!) Gallic Empire
  - Marcus Cassianus Postumus
  - Marcus Aurelius Marius
  - Victorinus
  - Tetricus I / Tetricus II
- AD 274:

== See also ==
- List of Frankish kings
- List of bishops and archbishops of Cologne
- Lists of ancient Roman governors
- Römisch-Germanisches Museum
