= Quintus Antistius Adventus =

2nd century Roman politician and general

Quintus Antistius Adventus (c. 120 AD – after 175 AD) was a Roman politician and general. He commanded a legion, the II Adiutrix in the war against the Parthian Empire (161-166), and was appointed suffect consul around 166.

His full name, as attested in two inscriptions from modern Algeria, was Quintus Antistius Adventus Postumius Aquilinus. Olli Salomies opines that his brother was Lucius Antistius Mundicius Burrus, and his nephew was likely Lucius Antistius Burrus, ordinary consul in 181. Where the name elements "Postumus Aquilinus" in Adventus' name came from is something of a mystery: Salomies points out that it is "quite inconceivable that he could have been a Postumus adopted by a Q. Antistius", yet notes it could have come from his mother's side because another inscription attests his mother's name as Antonia Prisca.

== Career ==
Professor Edward Champlin includes Adventus as a member of "a Cirtan community at Rome" he infers existed there, whose members included: Quintus Lollius Urbicus, consul in either 135 or 136; Gaius Arrius Antoninus, consul c. 170; and the orator Fronto. Champlin notes that Lollius Urbicus and Pactumeius Clemens themselves "could provide powerful support for Cirtan interests, and such support is attested by strong circumstantial evidence."

An inscription recovered from Thibilis in Numidia, combined with a second from another Numidian town Cirta, allows us to reconstruct his career from its beginning. Adventus began his career with membership in the quattuorviri viarum curandarum, which was the board that oversaw maintenance of the streets and public places in Rome; it was one of the four magistracies that comprised the vigintiviri, and membership in one of these boards was a preliminary and required first step toward a gaining entry into the Roman Senate. Next he was commissioned as the tribunus laticlavius in Legio I Minervia. Upon returning to Rome, he was elected quaestor, and in this office he went to Macedonia to manage its finances. Upon completing this office, Adventus was enrolled into the Senate. Next followed the office of sevir equitum Romanorum or presiding at the annual review of the equites at Rome, then the traditional Republican magistracy of plebeian tribune. Adventus was picked to serve as legatus or assistant to the proconsular governor of Africa, where he was for a year, until returning to Rome once again to hold a third traditional Republican magistracy, praetor. Géza Alföldy dates his praetorship to around 158.

Following his praetorship, Adventus was commissioned commander of Legio VI Ferrata; while holding this commission the Parthian War broke out. He was then transferred to the command of the II Adiutrix, probably in 162. From the dona militaria, or military honors, he was awarded fighting against Parthia, it is clear Antistius Adventus saw active service. He was appointed c. 164 governor of Arabia; an inscription from Bostra describes Antistius Adventus as consul designate, and Anthony Birley presumes he held that office while in Arabia. His next appointment was again in Rome as Curator of public buildings and works.

At this point Antistius Adventus was given an extraordinary command, as a general in the German Expedition (leg. Aug. at praetenturam Italiae et Alpium expeditione Germanica), which was launched by Marcus Aurelius and Lucius Verus in 168. His command was included the two newly raised Legiones II and III Italicae, protecting the passes through the Julian Alps from the invading German tribes. Although the tribes did penetrate the Julian Alps and attempted to capture Aquileia in 170, Birley believes by that time Antistius Adventus had moved on to the position of governor of Germania Inferior, the last post listed for him in the inscription from Thibilis.

Another inscription from Lanchester near Hadrian's Wall (RIB 1083) attests that Antistius Adventus was governor of Roman Britain. Birley believes his tenure there should be "very tentatively" dated to c. 173–6. This was the period that 5,500 Sarmatian cavalry troops arrived in Britain, so one of his tasks in Britain was providing lands for these troops to settle on. His activities after he was governor of Britain are unknown, although it is possible Antistius Adventus was the Adventus to whom Solinus dedicated his Collectanea rerum memorabilium, which includes the well-known reference to the use of coal in a temple to Minerva in Britain.

== Marriage and children ==
He was married to Novia Crispina, whom Birley identifies as the daughter of Lucius Novius Crispinus Martialis Saturninus, consul in either 150 or 151; this marriage, Birley suspects, allowed Antistius Adventus entry into his senatorial career. Birley also identifies Lucius Antistius Burrus, consul ordinarius for 181 and son-in-law of Marcus Aurelius, as his son.

Preceded by Unknown, previously Sextus Calpurnius Agricola	Roman governors of Britain	Succeeded by Caerellius Priscus
