= Pro Sestio =

Speech by Cicero

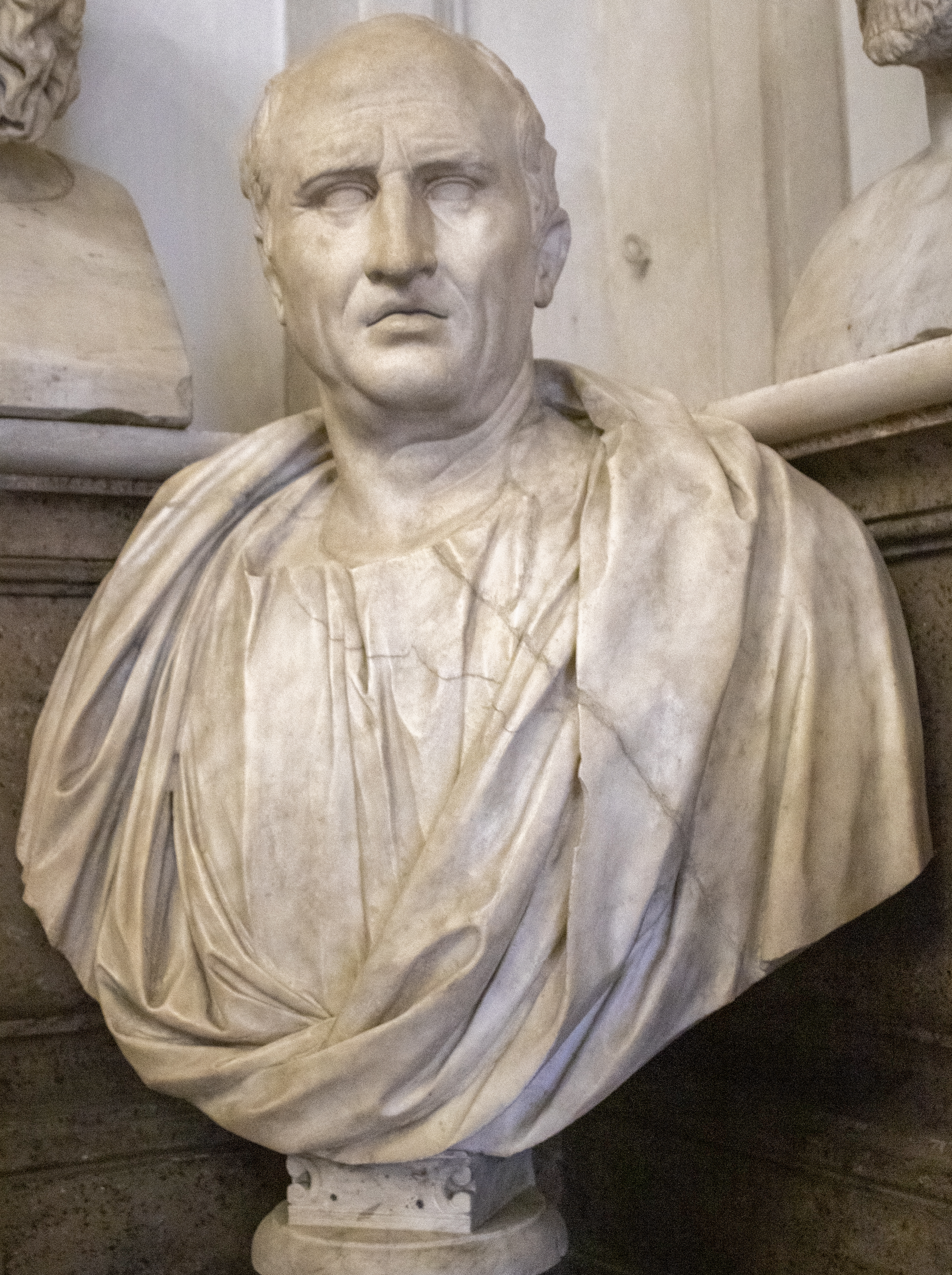
This bust of Cicero dates from the 1st century AD. Cicero was exiled during the tribunate of Publius Clodius Pulcher and, in part due to the efforts of the Publius Sestius for whom Cicero spoke, was recalled to Rome.

Pro Sestio was an oration given by the Roman orator and politician Marcus Tullius Cicero in defence of Publius Sestius for charges of public violence (vis) in February or March 56 BC. Sestius was a friend of Cicero's, and had been instrumental in Cicero's recall from exile in 57. Cicero argued that Sestius should not be punished because his actions were not only in self-defence but also in the interest of the republic. The defence was successful: Sestius was acquitted unanimously by the jury on 14 March 56 BC.

The speech is important in the study of Roman politics due to its seeming opposition of optimates and populares as labels for politicians standing for order and demagoguery, respectively. Whether this is actually what Cicero meant in his use of the words optimates and populares, and especially to what extent they reflected contemporary political realities, is debated.

== Summary ==
Cicero starts the speech by speaking of the troubled nature of Roman politics in the 50s BC. He then defends Sestius' character and career, giving an overview of his good deeds for the community – such as during the Catilinarian conspiracy – and towns across Italy. He then gives an overview of his exile at the hands of his enemies: the tribune Publius Clodius Pulcher and the consuls of 58 BC (Aulus Gabinius and Lucius Calpurnius Piso). Associating his exile with the poor state of Roman politics – and justifying his departure in terms of preserving peace among the people – Cicero then discusses how Sestius opposed his enemies and supported Cicero's return from exile amid an unprecedented outpouring of grief for Cicero's fate.

The core defence given for Sestius' organisation of a group of armed men is not to deny its happening but rather than justify it was necessary for the defence of his sacrosanct life as a plebeian tribune and of the state as a whole. He further justifies this by noting the support for Titus Annius Milo (who also had such organised men) from the optimates and that application of the law had been wholly unsuccessful in bringing Clodius (known also to have such organised men) to trial.

Answering a question as to who the optimates are, Cicero enters into a long aside, dividing politicians into two categories: those who seek the popularity from the crowd as populares and those who seek the approval of all the best men (whether they be senators, businessmen, or even freedmen). Cicero then defines the goal of the best men as "peace with dignity" (Latin: cum dignitate otium), upholding public religion, the rule of law, the advice of the senate, the traditions of the Roman people and state, the good faith of the Roman people, and the defence of the state and its fiscal health.

He then lambasts the populares as demagogues attempting to win popularity among a disorderly and temporary minority which does not have the interest of the whole community in mind. To emphasise this point, Cicero associates the whole Roman people with the label optimates due to their opposition to the hired crowds around Cicero's enemies, contrasting Clodius from previous populares such as the Gracchi brothers who had won genuine popularity rather than merely hired it.

Cicero then continues by issuing a call for politicians to put the country before their own advancement. He then associates Sestius' actions to support him as a defence of the state. The argument that Cicero concludes on is essentially that Sestius should not be punished for two reasons. The first is that he was doing what upstanding citizens everywhere (Cicero's optimates) believed was necessary. The second is that Sestius' actions were themselves necessary, motivated by patriotism, to defend the state from a minoritarian mob.

== Interpretation ==
The modern division of Roman politicians into two types or parties, optimates and populares, in part emerges from Pro Sestio. Whether these modern labels denoted any real division which would have been comprehensible to a Roman audience is hotly debated; there is, however, universal consensus that the two labels did not denote any political parties in a modern sense, with the common view that the terms reflected political tactics before the senate and people respectively.

Robert A Kaster, in his 2006 commentary on the speech, renders the terms optimate and popularis as "best sort" and "popular", respectively. In his view, Cicero's rhetoric was directed mainly towards undermining Clodius and the accusers' claim to be expressing the will of the people:

The very move with which he begins – presenting the distinction between "popular" and "optimate", only to collapse it immediately – is ... a variation on a basic premise of many speeches before the assembled people in the late Republic: that the important distinction lay not between optimates and populares but between "true" and "false" populares – those who really had the people's interest at heart... and those who claimed to do so out of self-seeking motives...

The division of politicians presented at the start therefore is more a tendentious rhetorical device, meant to persuade the court jury that problems in the state are the result of unpopular minoritarian agitators. Contrasting the "popular" politicians of 56 BC with the actually popular politicians of the past like the Gracchi, the jury should not only reject arguments that the people demand a conviction but identify Sestius with the republic and the whole people, justifying acquittal.

A similar presentation is given by Margaret Robb in her 2010 book Beyond Populares and Optimates, rejecting the idea of a division between populares and optimates grounded in political party, ideology, or political tactics. Instead, she compares Cicero's usage of the word popularis in Pro Sestio with that in Pro Rabirio perduellionis (a speech given in 59 BC). In the latter speech, Cicero argues that populares are those who defend the republic by vindicating citizens' rights. The usage of the word optimates in Pro Sestio, then, as a label for men defending the republic signals non-opposition. Populares in this speech is then only used semi-ironically to refer to men who claim themselves popular but, evidenced by their rejection by the Roman people in elections, prove merely failed demagogues.

The opposite view, suggesting the label to refer to general groupings of politicians, emphasises Cicero's introduction contrasting "two categories of men who have wished to engage in politics... one of these categories wanted to be considered, and to be, populares [popular], the other, optimates [the best men]". This view argues that Sallust's descriptions of Roman politics show a factionalisation in late republican politics between two parts (Latin: in duas partis) upholding the rights of the people and the authority of the senate, respectively, suggesting that the labels refer to those parts. Sallust, however, uses no such language. Whether this is because such use would be trite or because they would not have been recognisable labels for a Roman audience is debated.

== Transmission ==
The Pro Sestio was one of the classic pieces of Ciceronean prose, having by the ancient period been recognised as such and included in standard volumes of Cicero's speeches for rhetorical and oratorical study.

There are a number of manuscript descendants of the original oration, which was likely delivered in the Forum somewhat differently from how it is recorded. There are three separate lines of transmission. The first are the P manuscripts, named for Paris, which was created in the mid-ninth century AD. From it, descends the B (named for Bern) manuscript. The second is a hypothetical y manuscript from which the L manuscripts descend (written AD c. 860 and named for Leiden), along with the G (11th century, named for the Gembloux Abbey), V, and N manuscripts. The V manuscript (for the Vatican) and N recension (published in 1778 at Paris from a number of Italian manuscripts) also document this lineage, filling in for missing leaves of the L manuscript. The third line of transmission is that of the H manuscript (named for the Harleian Library) which also dates to the 12th century, and was once owned by Petrarch.

An arrangement of the manuscript stemma can be found in the 1986 Teubner edition, which mainly cited the P, L, G, and H manuscripts.

== Editions and commentaries ==
The standard Latin edition of the Pro Sestio is the 1986 Teubner, edited by Tadeusz Maslowski, superseding previous editions. Standard translations include the 2006 translation and commentary by Robert A Kaster in the Clarendon Ancient History series and the 1958 Loeb Classical Library translation by Robert Gardner.

== See also ==
- In Vatinium
- First Triumvirate

== Bibliography ==
- Alexander, Michael Charles (1990). Trials in the late Roman republic, 149 BC to 50 BC. Toronto: University of Toronto Press. ISBN 0-8020-5787-X. OCLC 41156621.
- Corke-Webster, James (2020). "Roman history". Greece and Rome. 67 (1): 94–103. doi:10.1017/S0017383519000287. ISSN 0017-3835.
- Pro Sestio. In Vatinium. Loeb Classical Library 309. Translated by Gardner, Robert. Harvard University Press. 1958. ISBN 978-0-674-99341-9.
- Kaster, Robert A (2006). Speech on behalf of Publius Sestius. Oxford: Clarendon Press. ISBN 978-1-4294-9127-3.
- Maslowski, Tadeusz, ed. (1986). Oratio pro Publio Sestio (in Latin). Leipzig: Teubner. doi:10.1515/9783110954975. ISBN 978-3-11-095497-5.
- Maslowski, Tadeusz (1993). Gnomon. 65 (4): 356–359. ISSN 0017-1417. JSTOR 27691358.
- Robb, M A (2010). Beyond populares and optimates: political language in the late republic. Steiner. ISBN 978-3-515-09643-0.
- Robb, M A (2018). "Optimates, populares". Encyclopedia of Ancient History. Wiley. doi:10.1002/9781444338386.wbeah20095.pub2.
- Steel, Catherine (2007). "Review of "Cicero: Speech on behalf of Publius Sestius"". Bryn Mawr Classical Review. ISSN 1055-7660.
- Wellesley, Kenneth (1989). Classical Review. 39 (1): 36–37. doi:10.1017/S0009840X00270261. ISSN 0009-840X. (Review of Maslowski 1986.)
- Yakobson, Alexander (22 August 2017), "optimates, populares", Oxford Classical Dictionary (Online ed.), Oxford University Press, doi:10.1093/acrefore/9780199381135.013.4578
