= Gaius Arrius Antoninus =

2nd century Roman senator, jurist and consul

Gaius Arrius Antoninus was a Roman senator and jurist active in the last half of the second century AD, who held a number of offices in the emperor's service. The date when he was suffect consul is not attested, but has been estimated to be around AD 173. Edward Champlin includes him, along with Gaius Aufidius Victorinus and Tiberius Claudius Julianus, as "marked out as a special intimate of Fronto's." Champlin notes that while Victorinus received five of the surviving letters of the rhetor Fronto, "as the beloved pupil and son-in-law", Antoninus received four, taking "the place of Fronto's son."

He is thought to have a son, Gaius Arrius Quadratus, praetor of Dacia, Ulpia Traiana Sarmizegetusa.

Despite the similarity in names, Antoninus was not related to Gnaeus Arrius Antoninus, the maternal grandfather of the emperor Marcus Aurelius; Géza Alföldy notes an inscription attests that his father was a leading citizen of Cirta in North Africa.

== Career ==
An inscription from Cirta provide details of his cursus honorum. He began his career as one of the quattuorviri viarum curandarum, one of the four boards that comprise the vigintiviri. This was followed by a commission as military tribune with Legio IV Scythica, which was stationed in Syria. Upon returning to Rome, Antoninus was appointed quaestor, a traditional Republican magistracy that gave him admission to the Roman Senate. Afterwards Antoninus served as sevir equitum Romanorum, then was appointed ab actis senatorum before he held the Republican magistracy of curule aedile. As praetor, Antoninus became the first to serve as praetor tutelaris. In this role Antoninus had the responsibility to appoint guardians or trustees for children and the mentally incompetent. Until the emperor Marcus Aurelius had created this praetorian position, the appointment of these trustees had been the duty of the consuls.

Having held the office of praetor, Antoninus was now qualified to hold a number of important offices. Normally these offices would include the governorship of a province and command of a legion, but Antoninus handled a series of legal and financial responsibilities. First he was juridicus for the region of Italy known as Transpadia primus, or the territory beyond the Po River. Bernard Remy uses an inscription from Concordia in Regio X of Italia to date his tenure; the city council of that town publicly thanks Antoninus for ensuring the city's supply of wheat in a period of scarcity, which Remy dates to the year 166, when the Antonine plague had reached Italy at the beginning of the new war on the Danube. Next Antoninus was a prefect of the aerarium Saturni, or the general treasury; the dates he held this office fall between the years 168, 171. During this time he was appointed curator, or financial administrator, for a number of Italian towns, which included Nolanus, Ariminum, and several towns in Aemilia. This activity was concluded with his suffect consulship.

After his consulship, Antoninus was governor of four provinces; three were imperial provinces. He was appointed governor of Cappadocia, and according to Alföldy he held this office from the year 174 to 177. The reason an ex-consular who had little military experience would be appointed a province with a significant garrison is obvious: he was replacing Publius Martius Verus in Cappadocia, so Verus could take over Syria and re-establish government control following the unsuccessful rebellion of its governor, Avidius Cassius. Marcus Aurelius needed loyal men in these key positions, and while Antoninus had little military experience he was not only loyal but competent. Next Antoninus was assigned to Dacia, which had become a consular province in the year 166; Antoninus held this assignment from around the year 177 to 178. The third imperial province is Dalmatia, which Antoninus governed from around 178 to around 179. The last was the pinnacle of senatorial career, proconsular governor of Asia, which Antoninus held during the reign of Commodus. According to Tertullian, while serving in this capacity, he refused to condemn a group of hundreds of Christians who appeared before him and demanded that they be executed and made martyrs; instead, he advised them that if they sought death, they should throw themselves off a cliff.

== Death ==
Antoninus was one of the many victims of the misrule of emperor Commodus. The Historia Augusta states at one point that Commodus' creature Cleander had Antoninus killed as a favor to Attalus, whom Antoninus had convicted while proconsul of Asia. However, Cleander's arbitrary actions infuriated the populace, so Commodus "presented him to the common people to pay the penalty." However, in a different portion, the Historia Augusta claims that Antoninus was the target of Pertinax, who was briefly emperor after Commodus' murder; he told Commodus that Arrius Antoninus and Lucius Antistius Burrus were plotting to seize control of the empire.
