= Tiberius Claudius Julianus =

2nd century Roman senator and consul

Tiberius Claudius Julianus was a Roman senator and literary figure who held several offices in the imperial service during the later second century AD. He was suffect consul during the nundinium of September-October 154 with Sextus Calpurnius Agricola as his colleague.

Julianus came from a well-to-do family in Roman Asia Minor. His grandmother, Julia Quintilia Isauria, was the daughter of Tiberius Julius Celsus Polemaeanus, consul in 92.

== Literary connections ==
Julianus is known to have had a number of contacts or interactions with literary figures of his generation, most prominently the orator Marcus Cornelius Fronto. Edward Champlin includes him, along with Gaius Aufidius Victorinus and Gaius Arrius Antoninus, as "marked out as a special intimate of Fronto's." Champlin notes that while Victorinus received five of the surviving letters of the rhetor Fronto, Julianus received four, adding that "in a fit of despair Fronto could consider Iulianus to be his only remaining friend".

Three of Fronto's surviving letters to him provide information about Julianus. The first (Ad Am. I.5) ostensibly is a letter of commendation on behalf of a young man named Calvisius Faustinianus for a post in Julianus' provincial army; but as Champlin notes, Fronto brushes aside all matters of Faustinianus' military skills to praise the young man's eloquence, challenging Julianus to test the man's judicial ability, and his literary taste. The next (Ad Am. I.19), which Champlin notes is difficult to read, "appears to treat of a literary quarrel with that eternal disciple, Aulus Gellius". The third (Ad Am. I.20) concerns a provincial lawsuit, where Julianus has asked for Fronto's intervention; the letter mentions one Valerianus, whom Champlin identifies with a grammaticus who was the teaching colleague of Pertinax.

Champlin offers other possible connections for Julianus. The Suda mentions that the sophist Damophilius was patronized by one Julianus who might be Claudius Julianus, although he has been identified with Didius Julianus. Another possible connection is with Herodes Atticus: in his Lives of the Sophists Philostratus mentions a letter Herodes wrote to a Julianus wherein he describes his slave nicknamed "Hercules of Herodes", although this Julianus has also been identified with an Antoninus Julianus from Hispania, whom Aulus Gellius recounts got the better of his opponents in a contest at a literary banquet over the quality of Greek versus Latin poetry.

== Imperial career ==
His cursus honorum is only imperfectly known. There is evidence that Julianus was legatus legionis or commander of Legio XI Claudia, stationed at Durostorum (Silistra); Géza Alföldy dates the tenure of his commission as from around the year 145 to 148. Following his consulate, Julianus is attested as governor of Germania Inferior in the year 160; Alföldy estimates the actual span of his governorship as extending from 160 to 163.

Political offices
| Preceded by Marcus Valerius Etruscus (?), and Lucius Aemilius Juncus (?) as consules suffecti | Suffect consul of the Roman Empire; 154 with Sextus Calpurnius Agricola | Succeeded by Gaius Julius Statius Severus, and Titus Junius Severus as consules suffecti |
