= Gaius Arrius Quadratus =

Gaius Arrius Quadratus was a Roman senator. As praetor he was appointed governor of the imperial province of Dacia. He was the son of Gaius Arrius Antoninus, senator and jurist.
