= Romano-Germanic Museum =

Archaeological museum in Cologne, Germany

Coordinates: 50°56′26″N 6°57′30″E

- Römisch Germanisches Museum
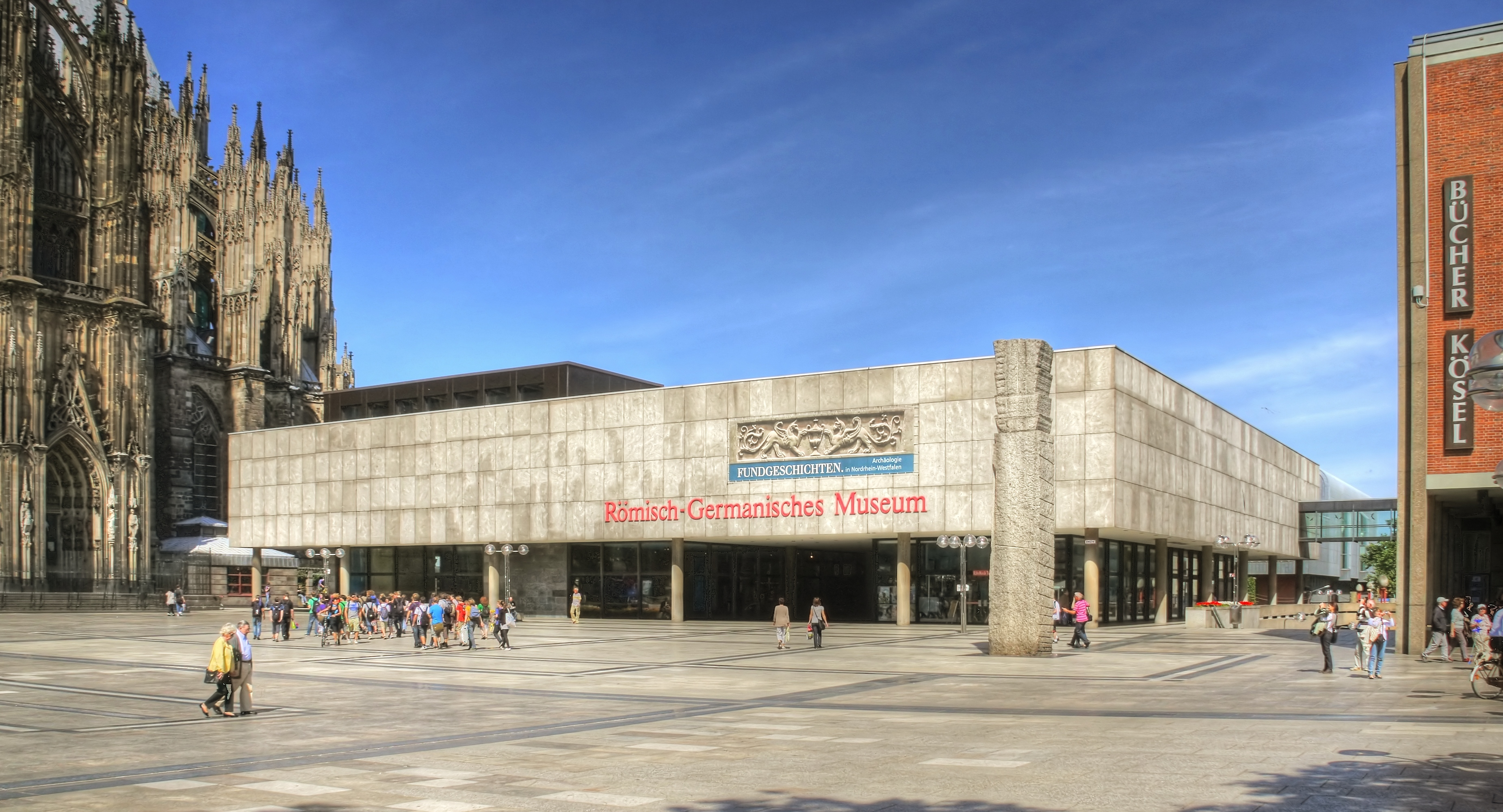
- Romano-Germanic Museum
- Established: 1946; New building: 1974
- Location: Cologne, Germany
- Collection size: Cologne Roman cultural heritage
- Public transit access: 5 16 18 Köln Hbf
- Website: https://www.roemisch-germanisches-museum.de/Startseite

The Romano-Germanic Museum (RGM, in German: Römisch-Germanisches Museum) is an archaeological museum in Cologne, Germany. It has a large collection of Roman artifacts from the Roman settlement of Colonia Claudia Ara Agrippinensium, on which modern Cologne is built. The museum protects the original site of a Roman town villa, from which a large Dionysus mosaic remains in its original place in the basement, and the related Roman Road just outside. In this respect the museum is an archaeological site.

The museum also has the task of preserving the Roman cultural heritage of Cologne, and therefore houses an extensive collection of Roman glass from funerals and burials and also exercises archaeological supervision over the construction of the Cologne underground.

Most of the museum's collection was housed at the Wallraf-Richartz Museum in Cologne until 1946. In the front of the museum the former northern town gate of Cologne with the inscription CCAA (for Colonia Claudia Ara Agrippinensium) is on display in the building.

The museum building has been closed for general renovation since 2018. Important exhibits are shown in the interim at the Belgian House (Maison Belge – Belgisch Huis, Cäcilienstraße 46) near Neumarkt.

== The museum ==
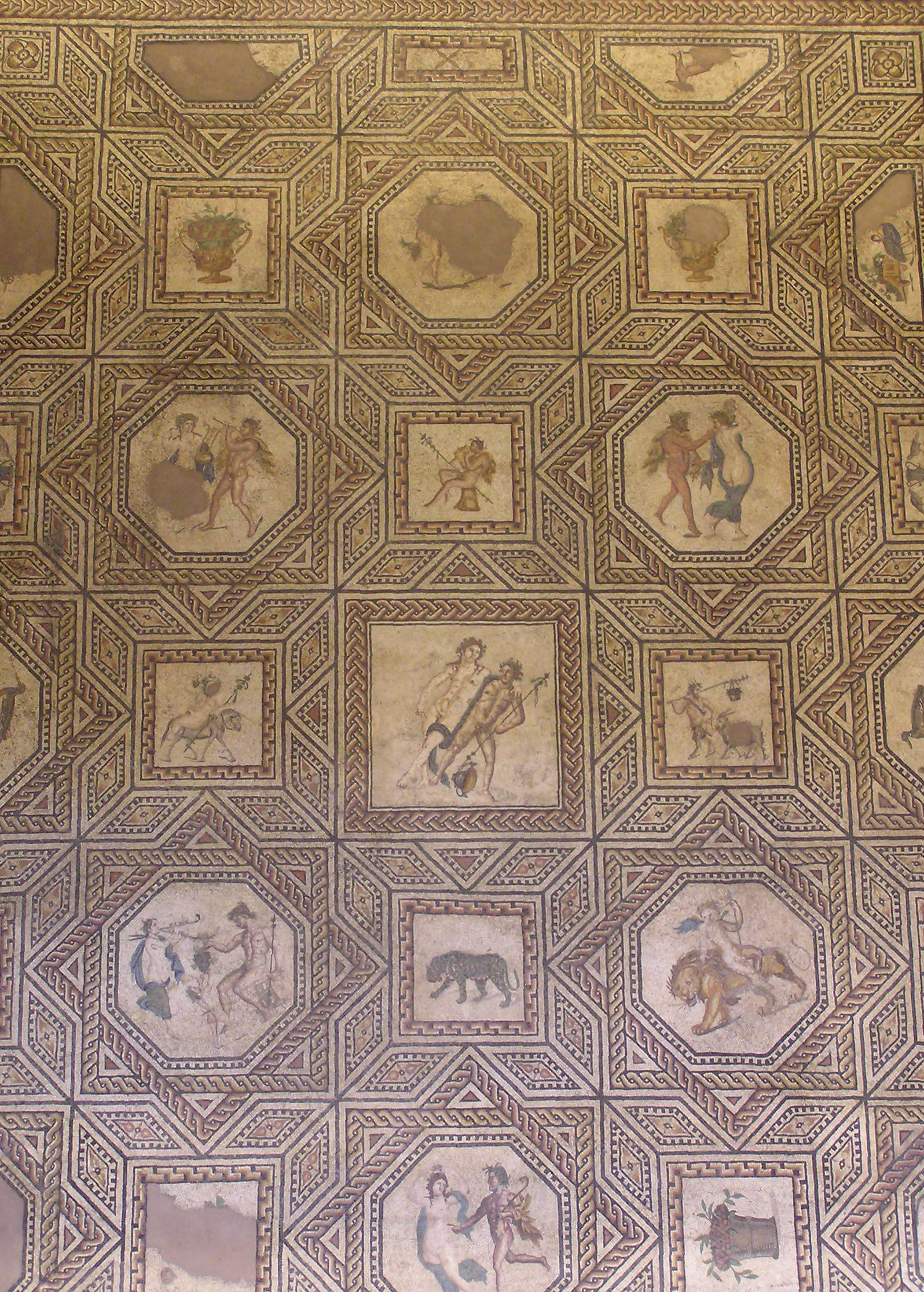
Section of the Dionysus mosaic (220-230 AD) in the Römisch-Germanisches Museum Cologne

The Römisch-Germanisches Museum, which opened in 1974, is near Cologne Cathedral, on the site of a 3rd-century villa. The villa was discovered in 1941 during the construction of an air-raid shelter. On the floor of the main room of the villa is the renowned Dionysus mosaic. Since the mosaic could not be moved easily, the architects Klaus Renner and Heinz Röcke designed the museum around the mosaic. The inner courtyards of the museum mimic the layout of the ancient villa.

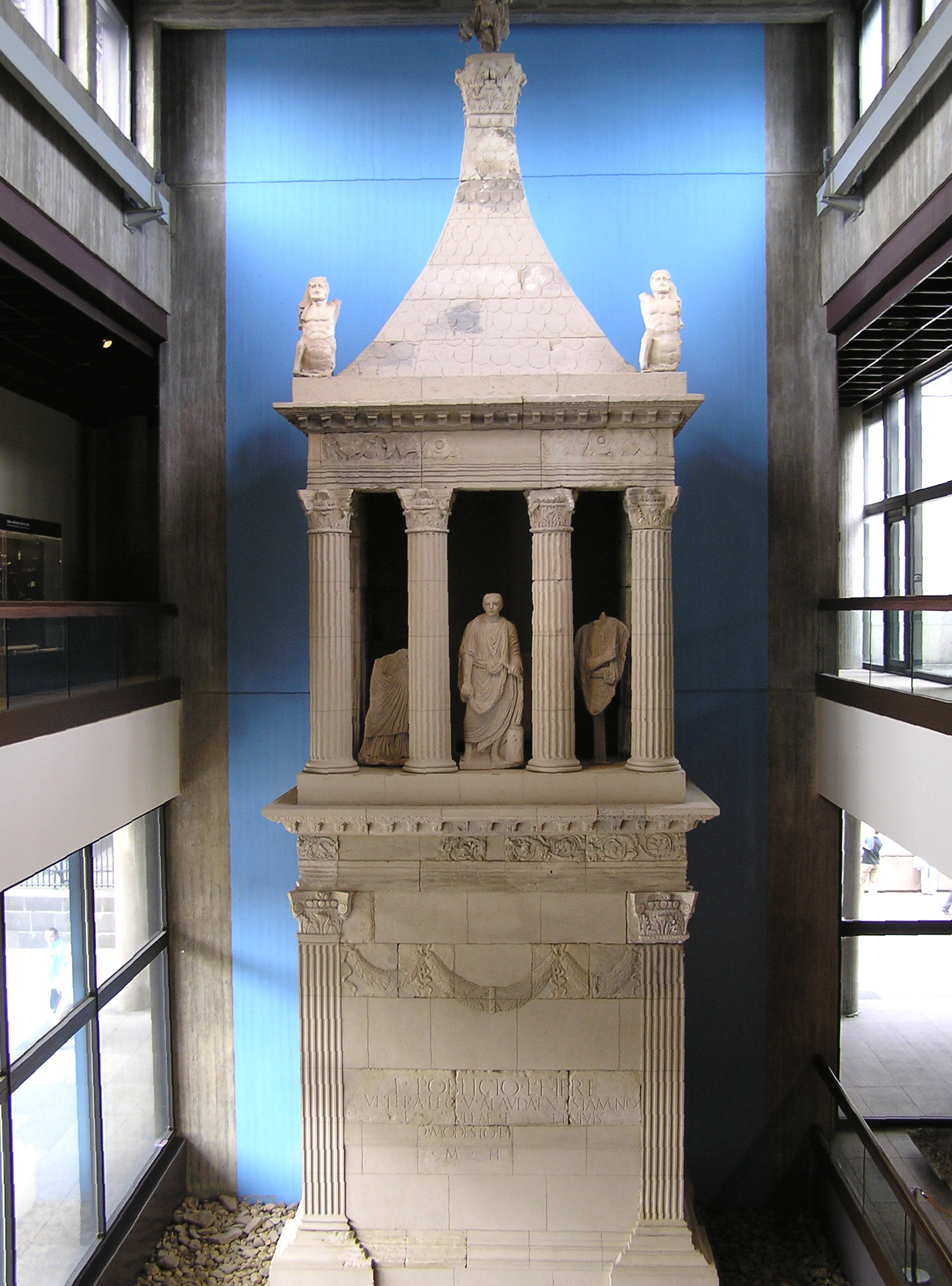
Sepulchre of Poblicius, 40 AD

In addition to the Dionysus mosaic, which dates from around A.D. 220/230, there is the reconstructed sepulchre of the legionary Poblicius (about A.D. 40). There is also an extensive collection of Roman glassware as well as an array of Roman and medieval jewellery. Many artefacts of everyday life in Roman Cologne, ivory and bone objects, bronzes — including portraits of Roman emperor Augustus and his wife Livia Drusilla —, coins, wall paintings, inscriptions, pottery and architectural fragments round out the displays.

The museum has the world's largest collection of Roman glass vessels from the 1st to 4th centuries, with more than 4,000 complete collection pieces, including a large number of luxury glasses such as figure vessels, snake thread glasses, cut glasses and tricolor diatretes, for example the famous Cologne cage cup from the 4th century, a top piece known among experts. Typical are glass drinking vessels that are decorated with attached glass drops of a different color, the so-called Cologne nubs. The collection, which also includes Franconian glass, continues to grow through excavation finds from the Roman necropolises.

On the night of 18 January 2007, Cyclone Kyrill blew a sheet of plywood through the glass front of the museum right onto the Dionysus mosaic. The damage was repaired within a week.

== See also ==
- Cage cup
- Conchylia cup
- Roman governors of Germania Inferior

== Collections (images) ==
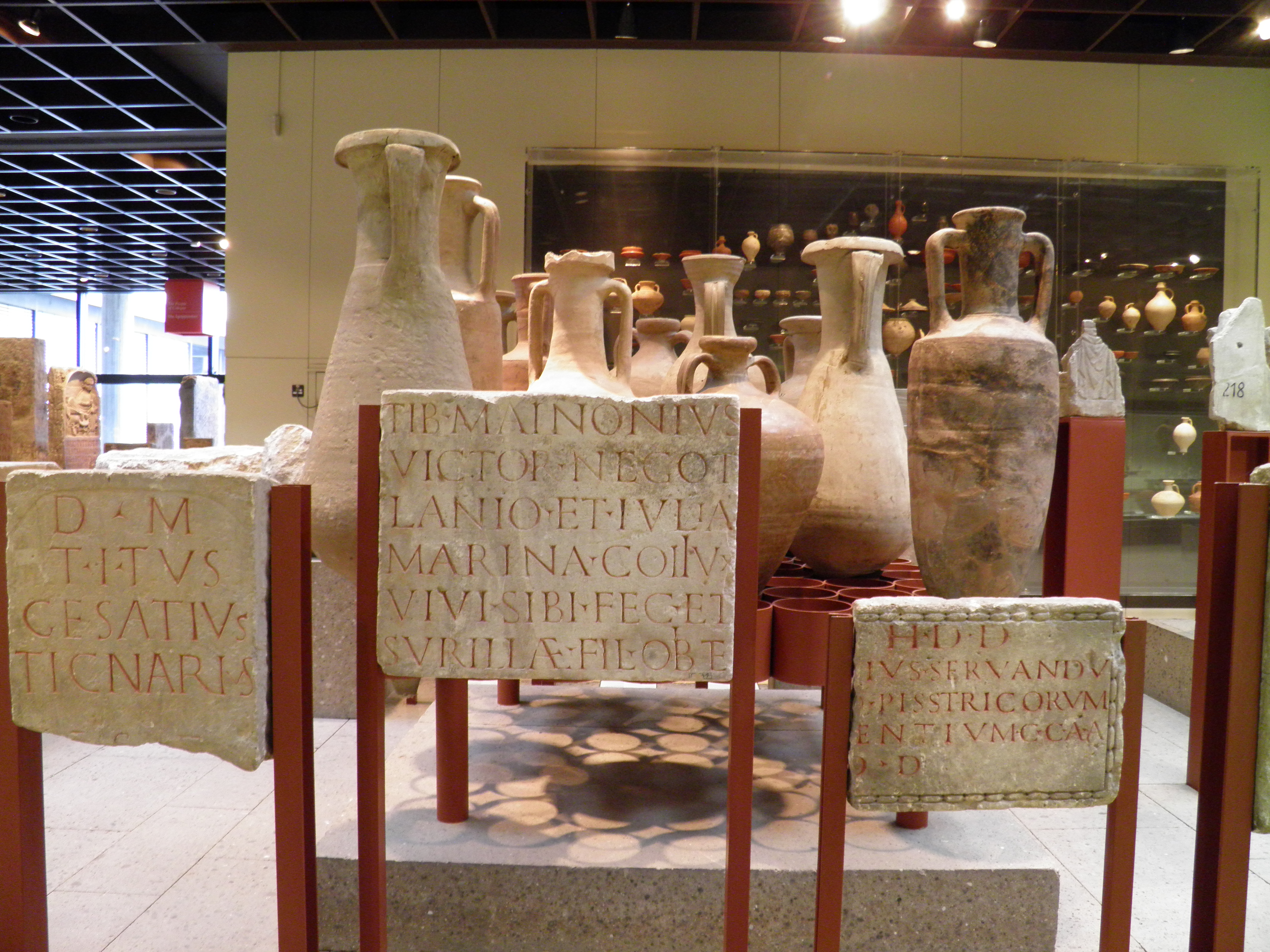
Trading on the Rhine

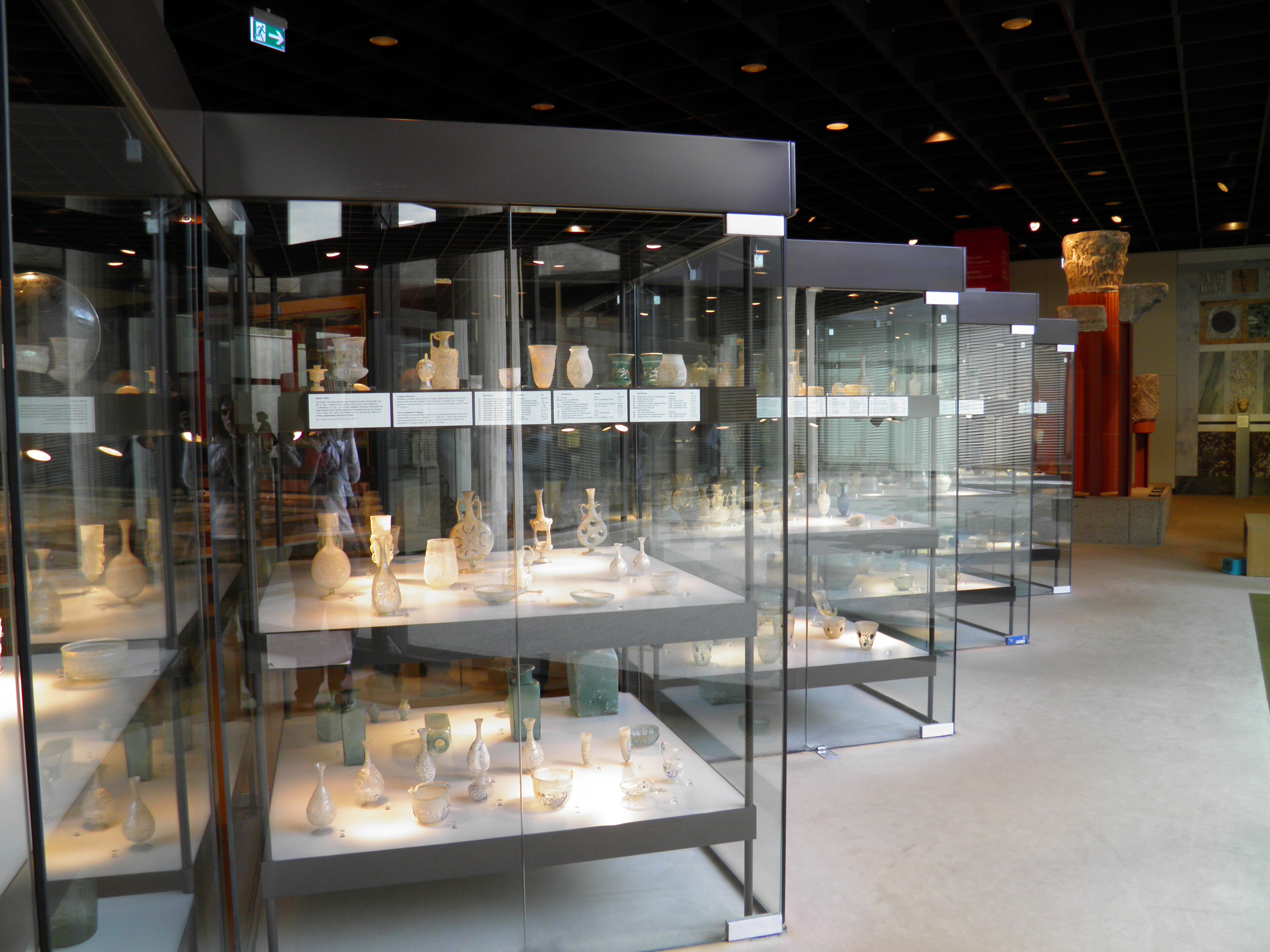
Collection of Roman glassware

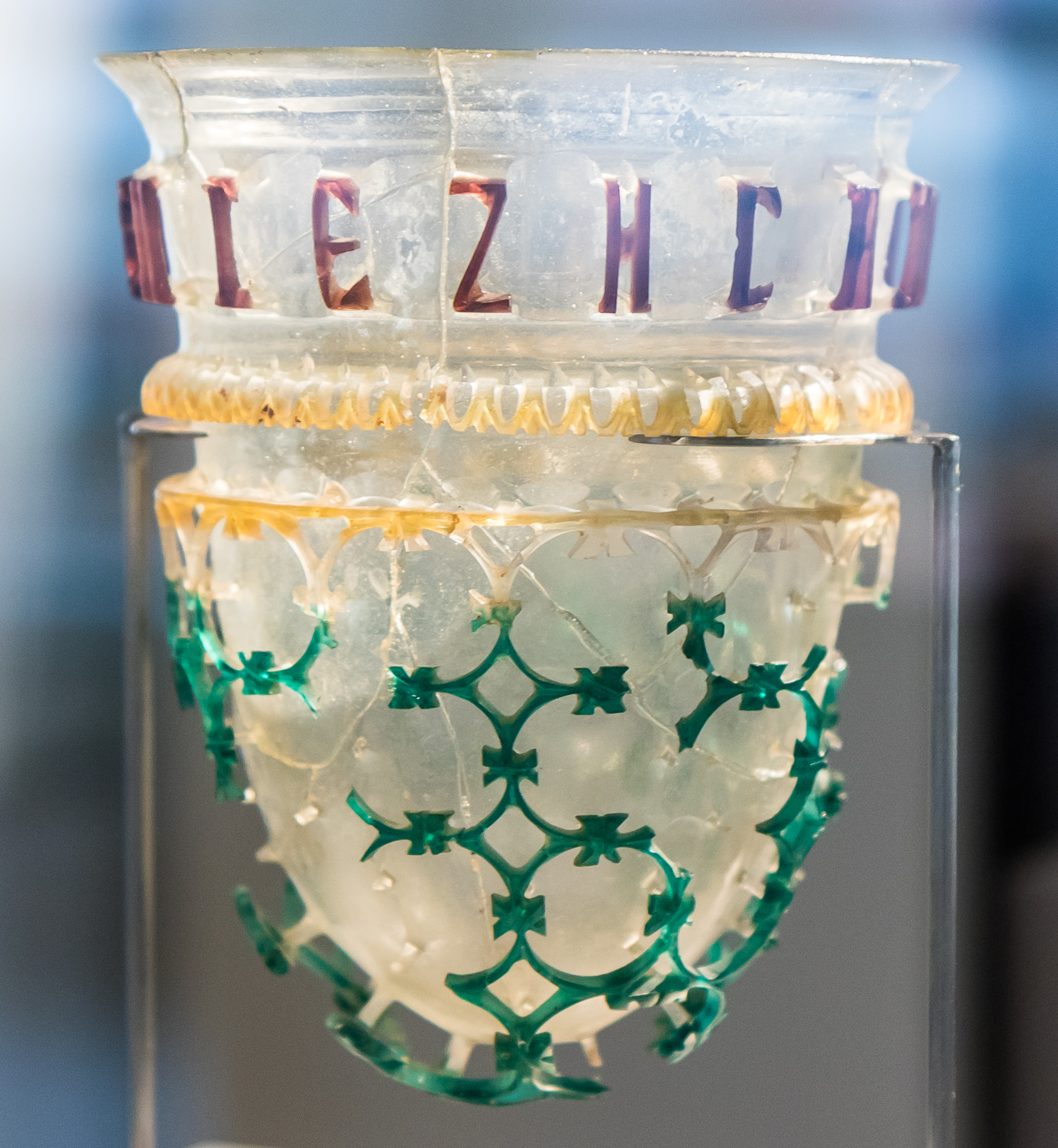
The Cologne cage cup, 12 cm high, 4th century

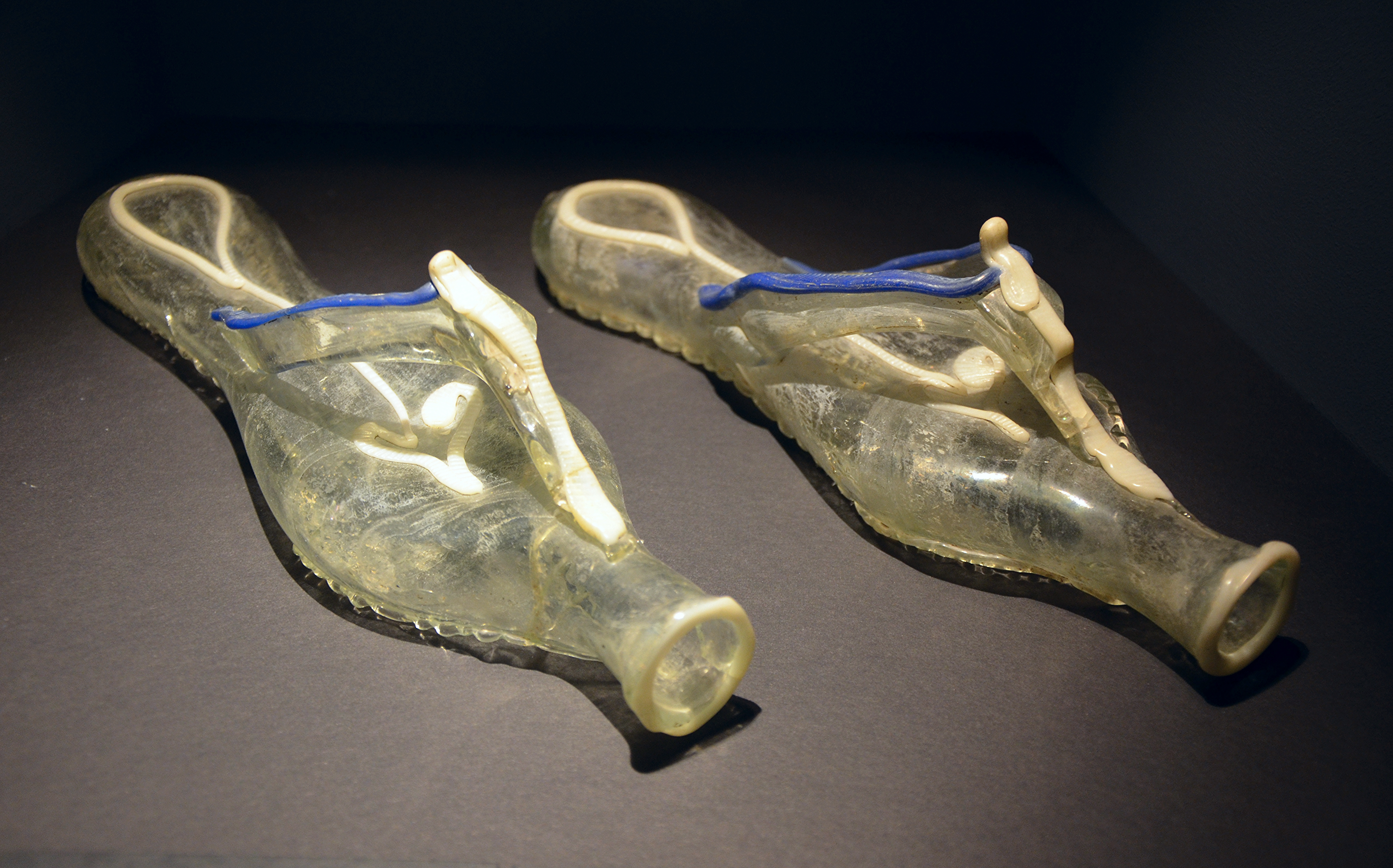
Sandal-shaped glass vessels

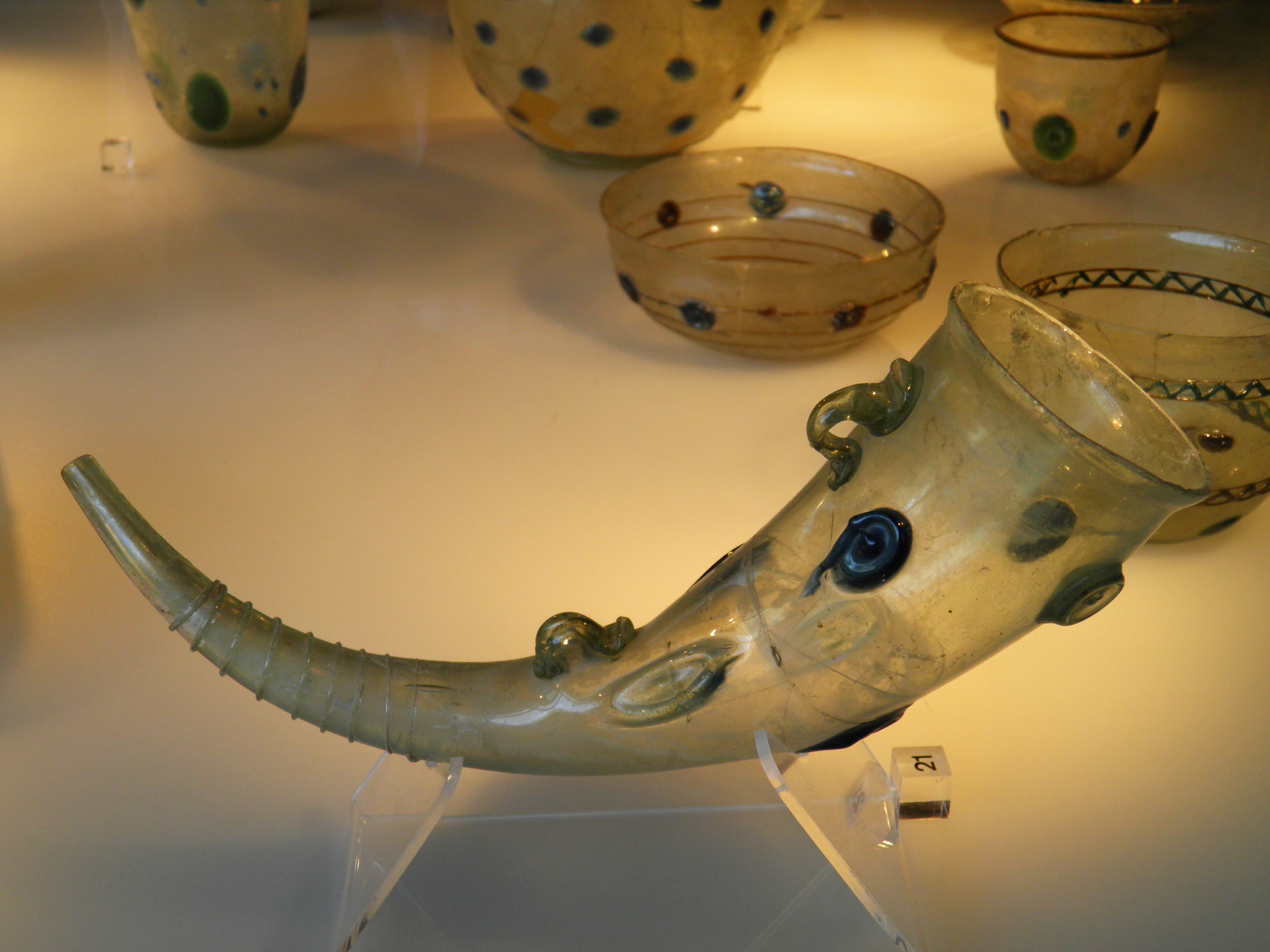
spot-patterned Roman glassware, typical for Cologne

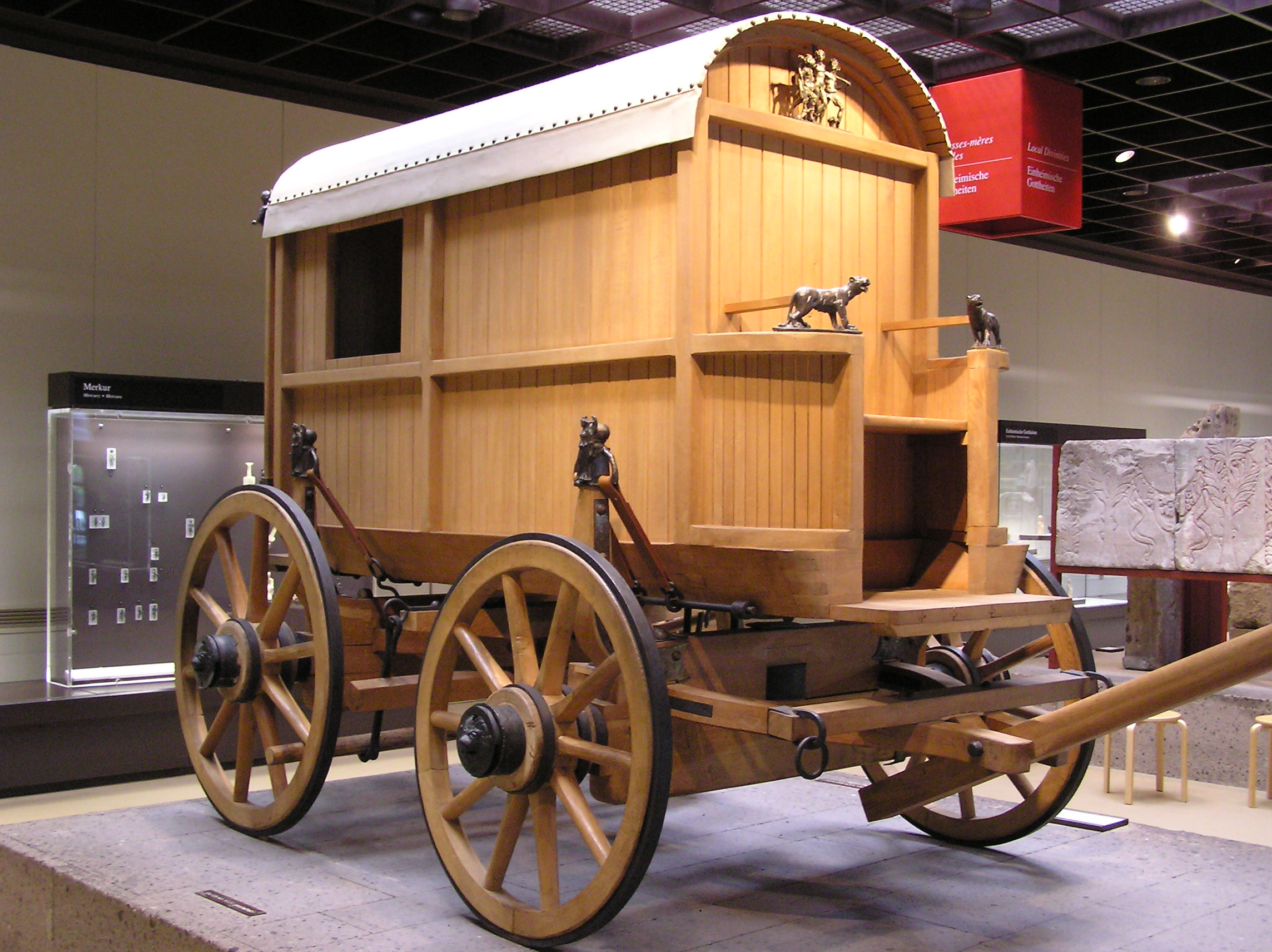
Replica of a Roman carriage

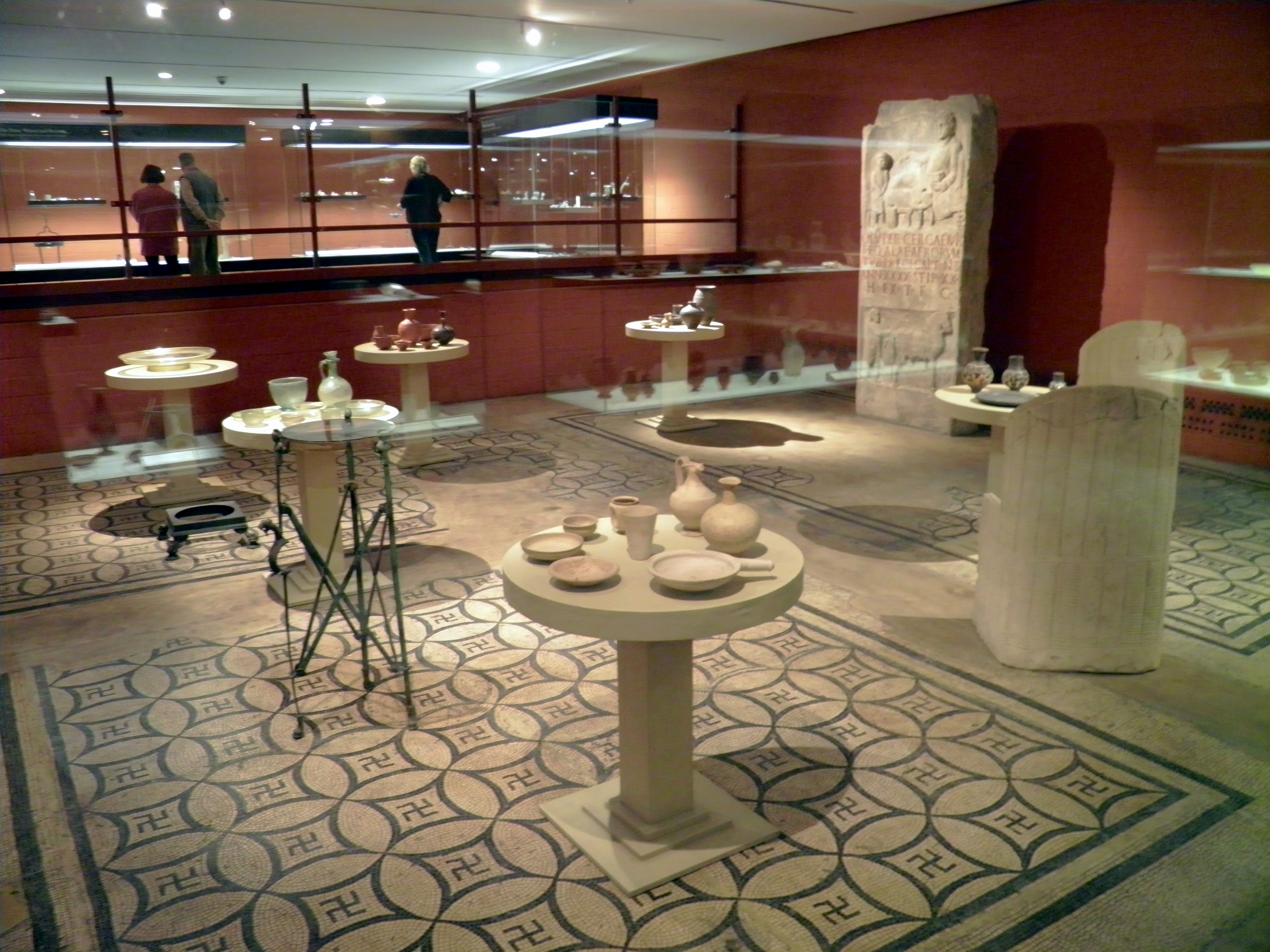
Mosaic floor

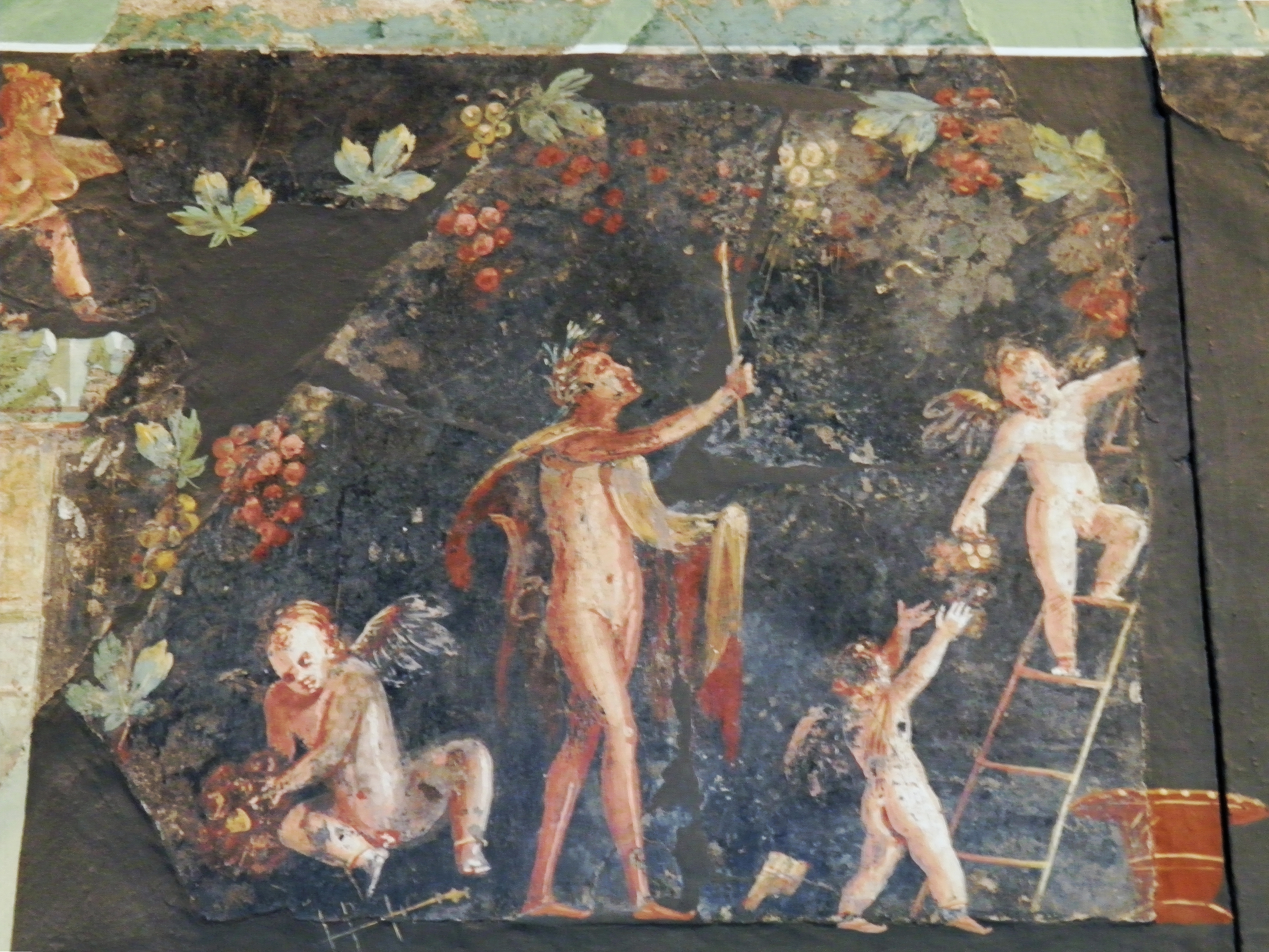
Wall painting with Dionysian scenes

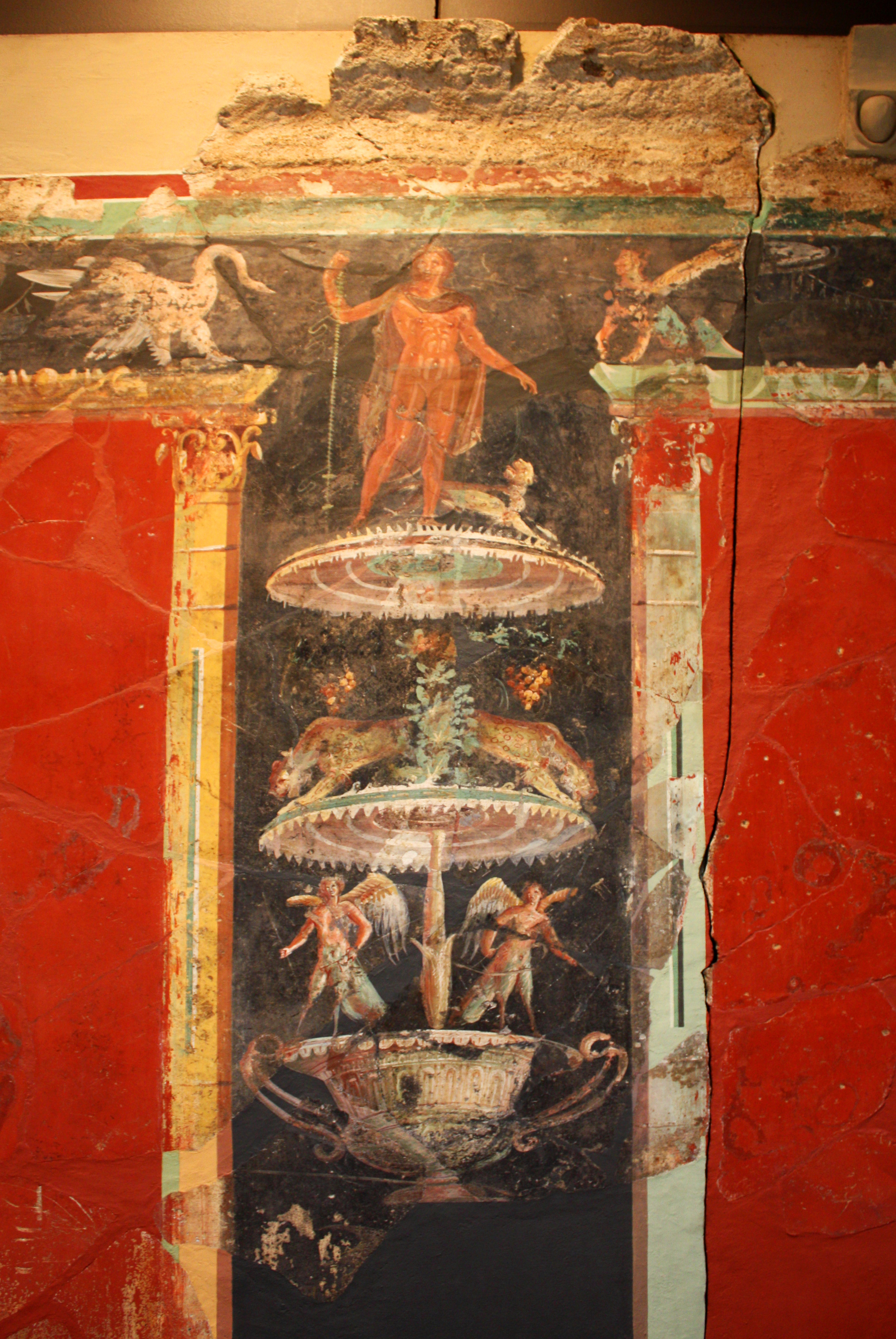
Wall painting

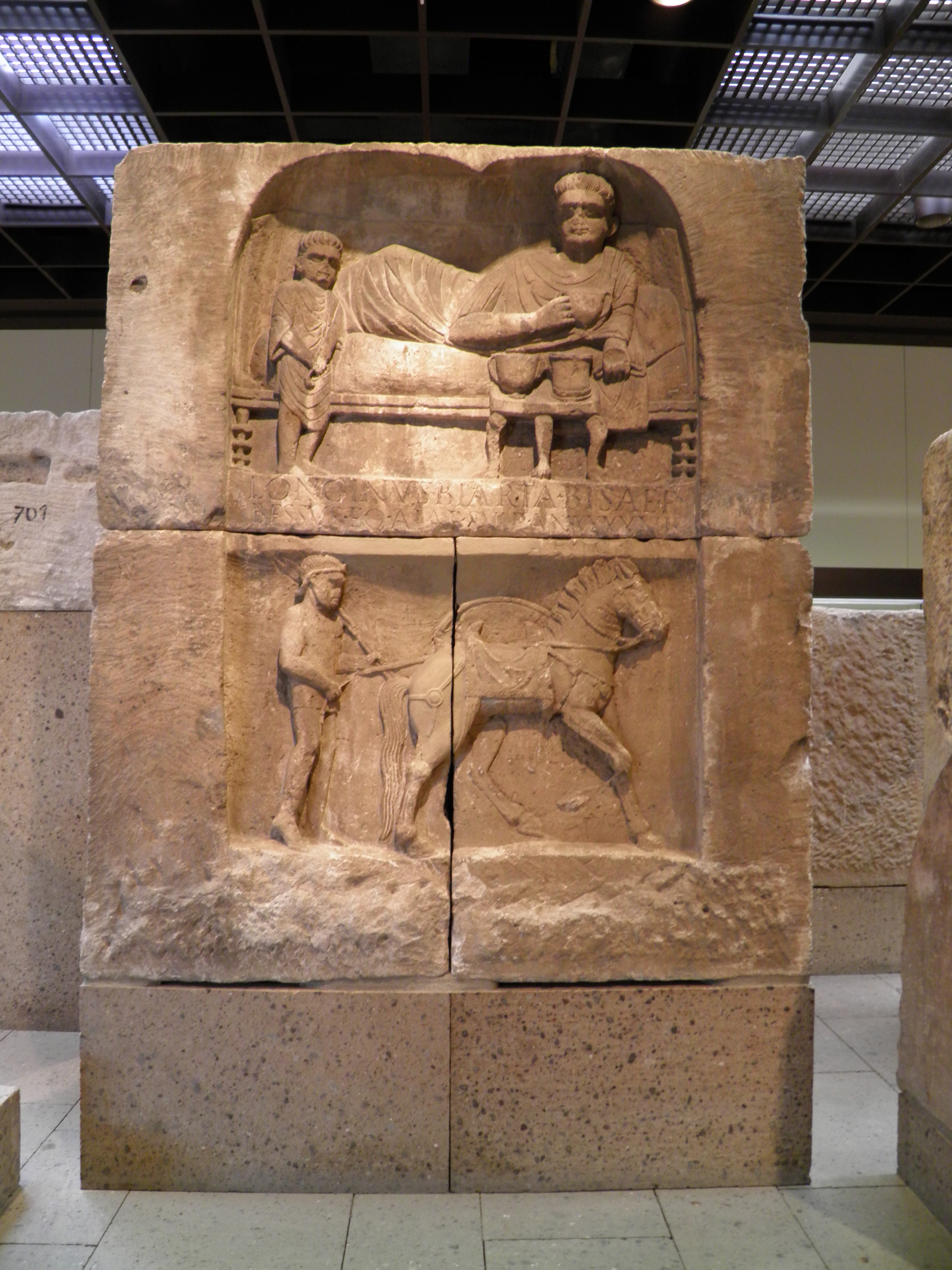
Tombstone of calvalryman Longinus Biarta

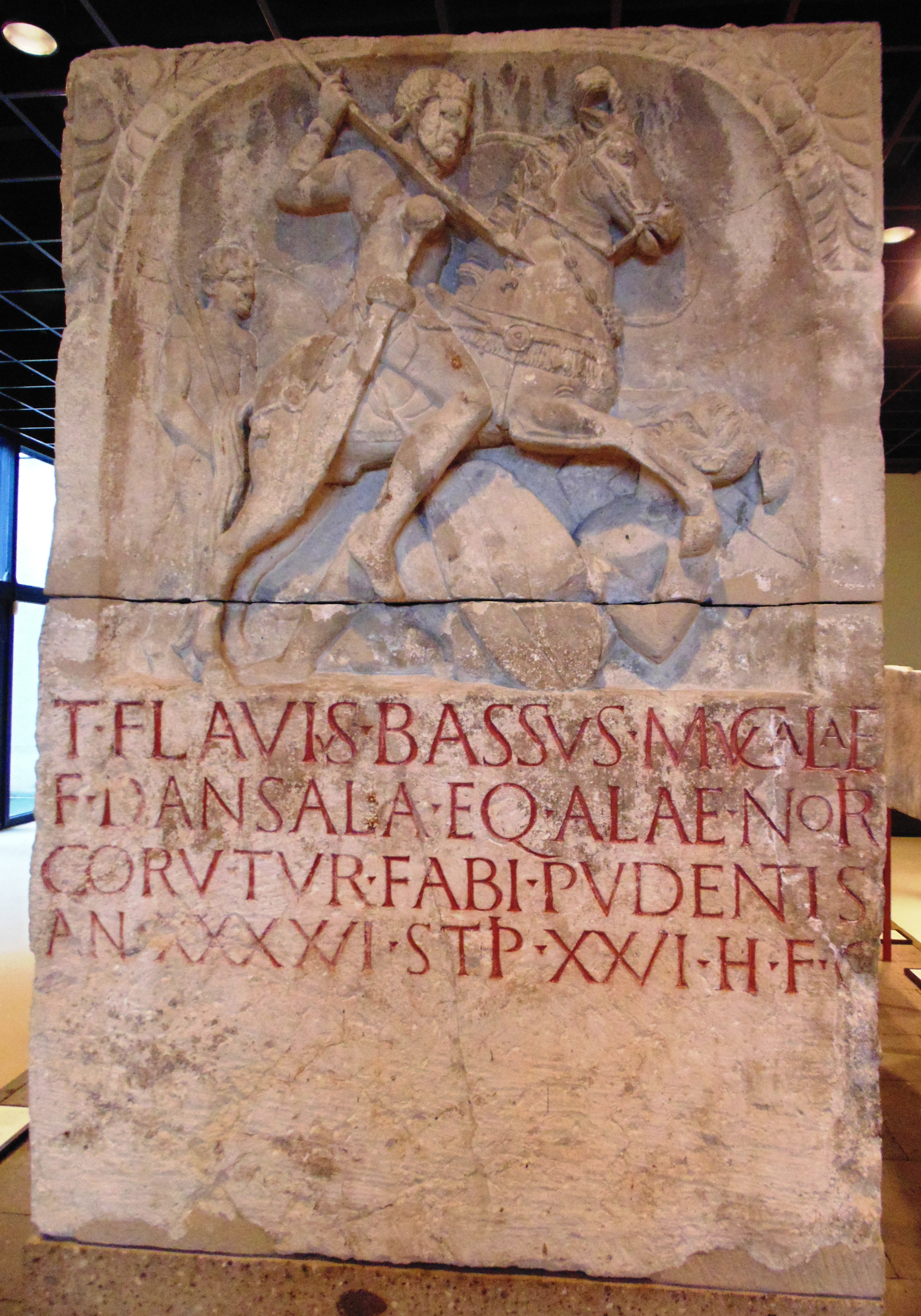
Tomb for the cavalry soldier Flavius Bassus

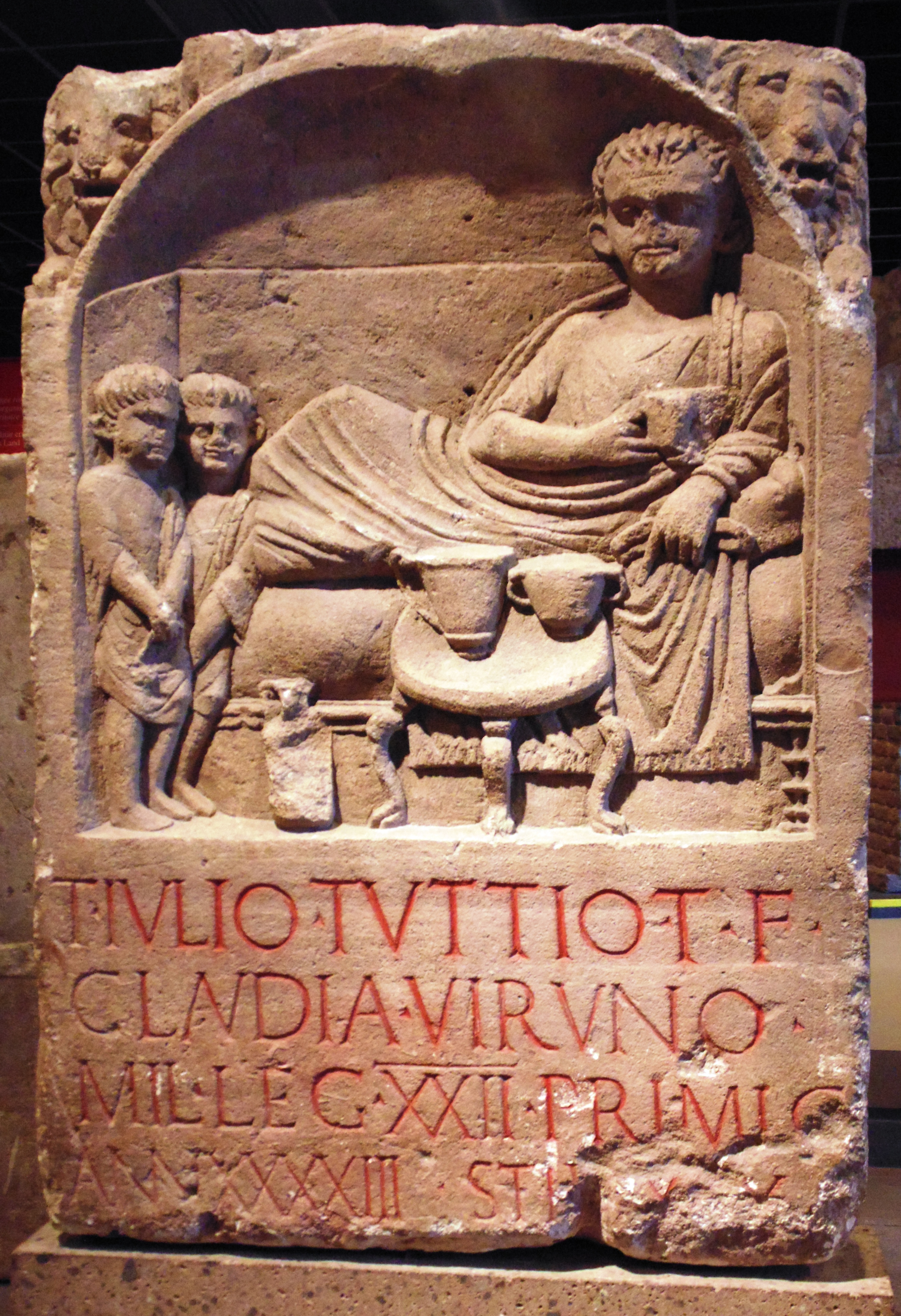
Gravestone for Titus Iulius Tuttius

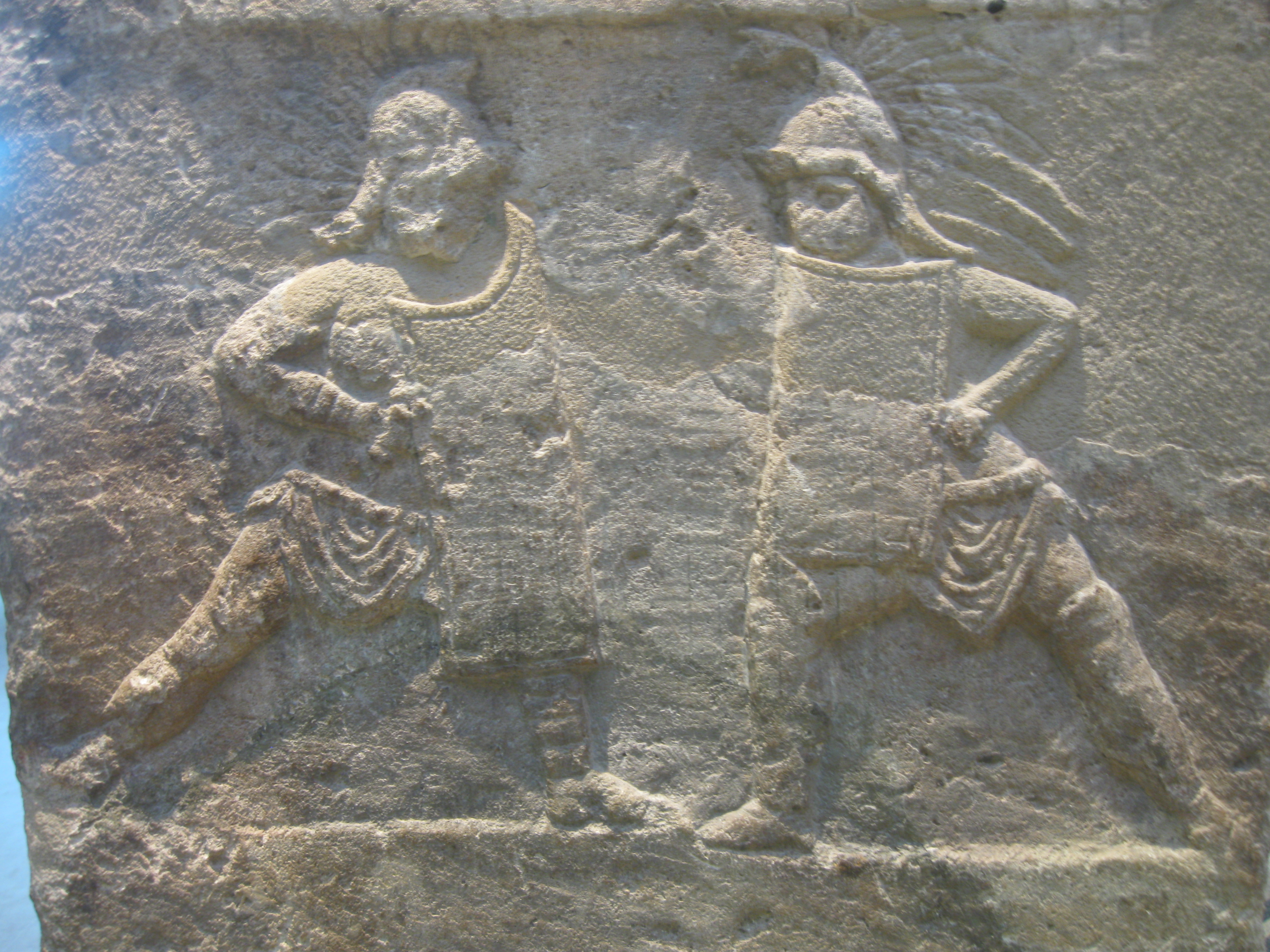
Gravestone for gladiator Aquilus (1st half of the 1st century)

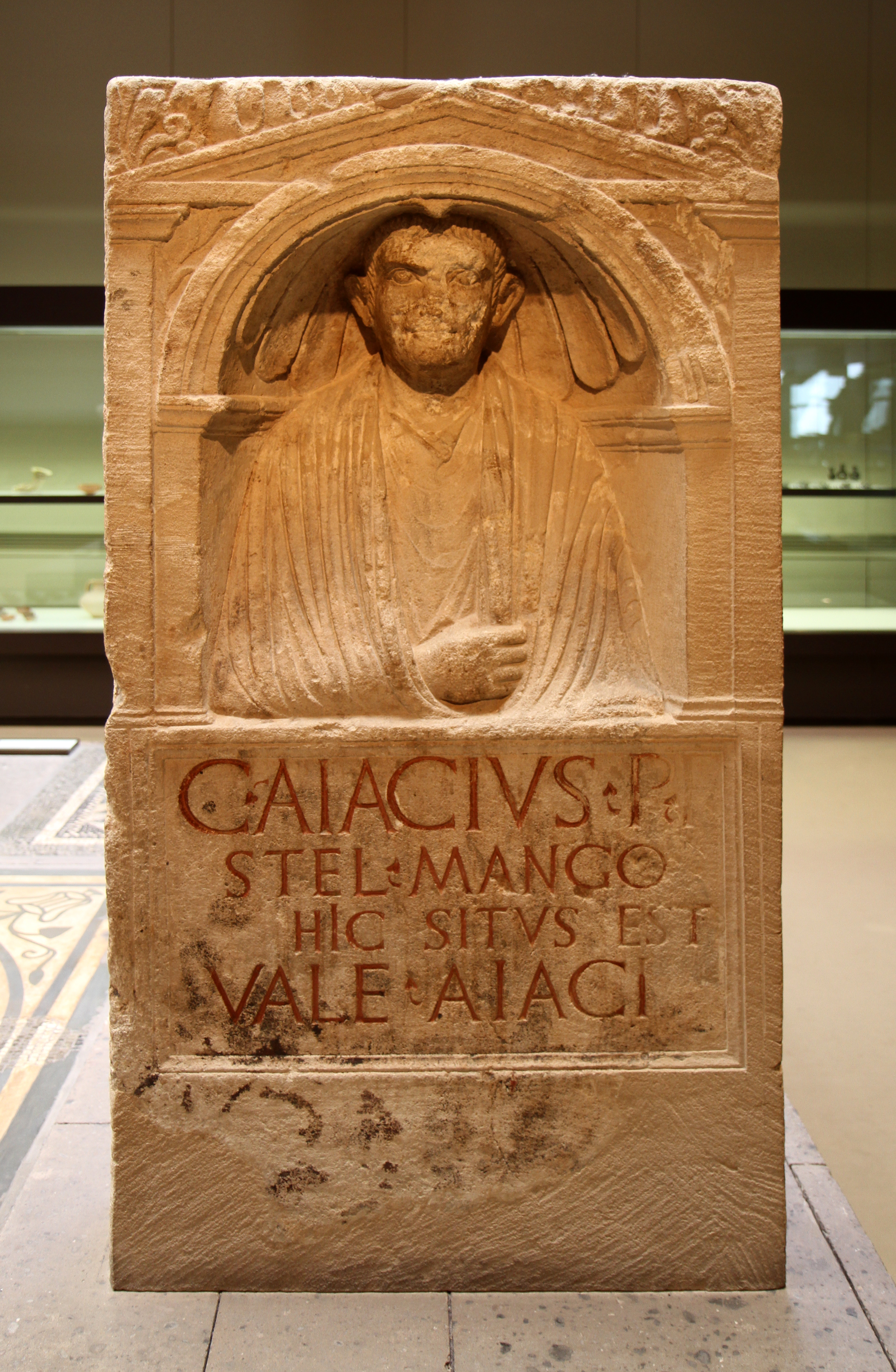
Gravestone for the slave trader Caius Aiacius

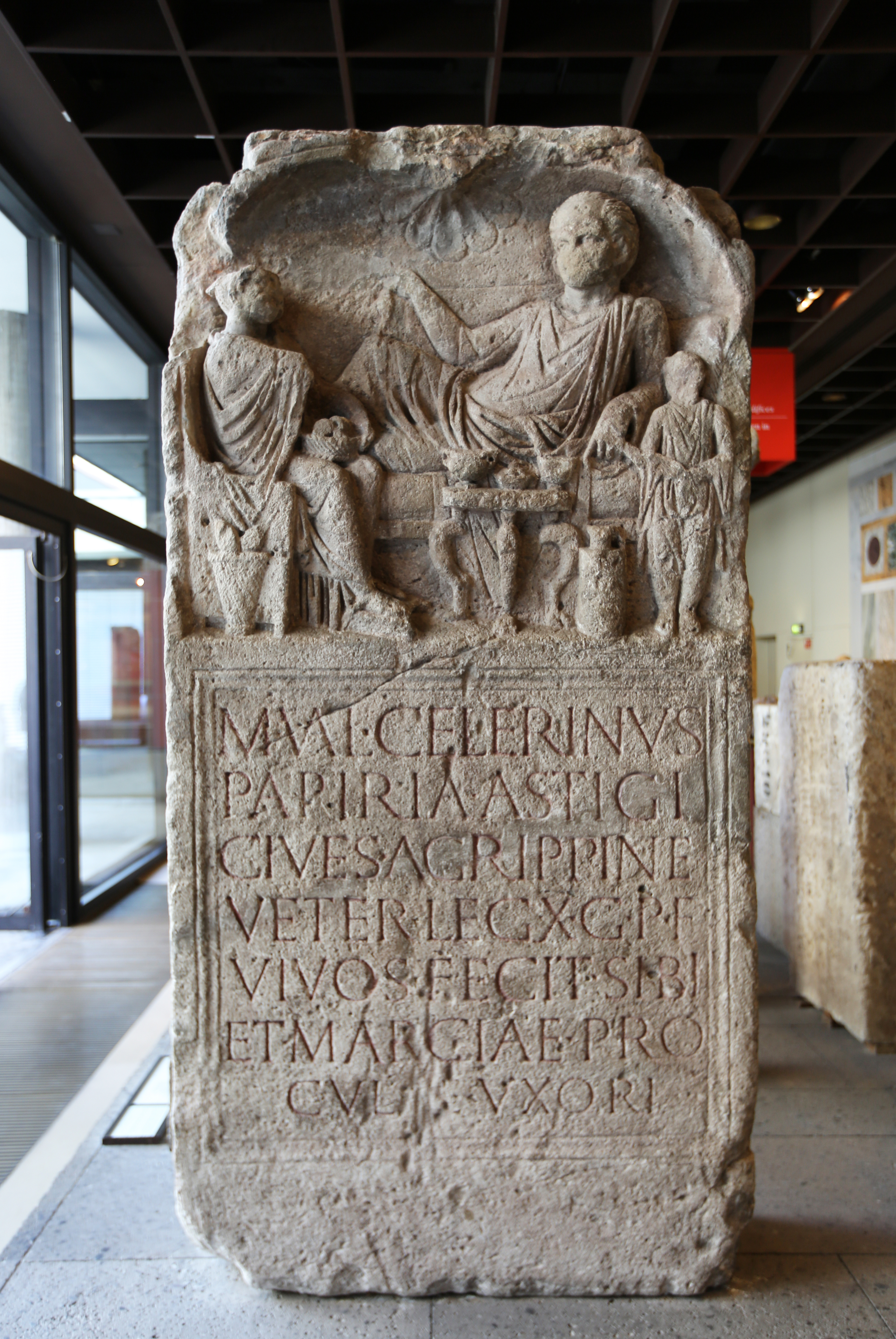
Tombstone of the veteran Marcus Valerius Celerinus and his wife Marcia Procula

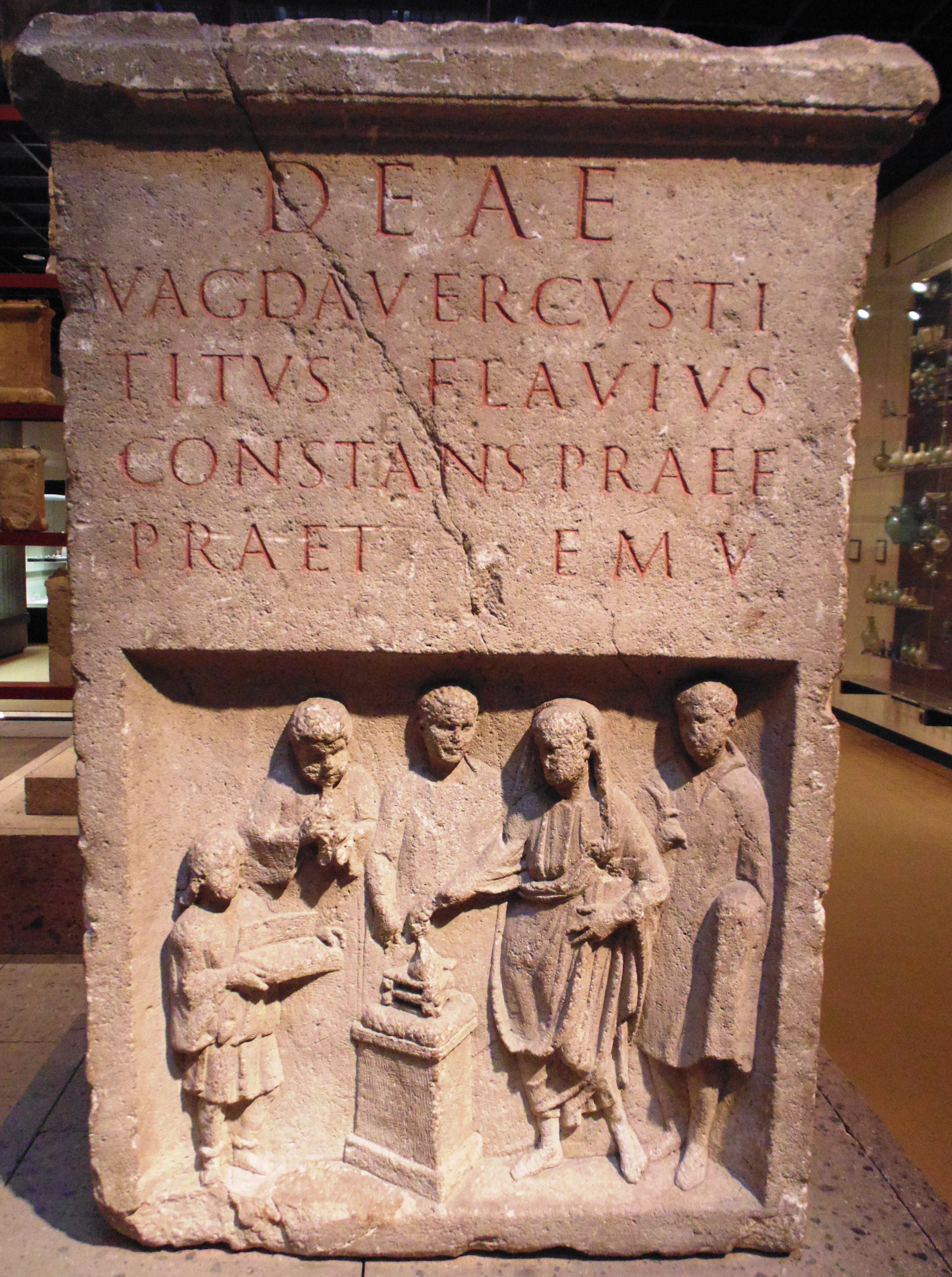
Consecration altar of Titus Flavius Constans (Prefect of the Praetorian Guard) in 165 AD.

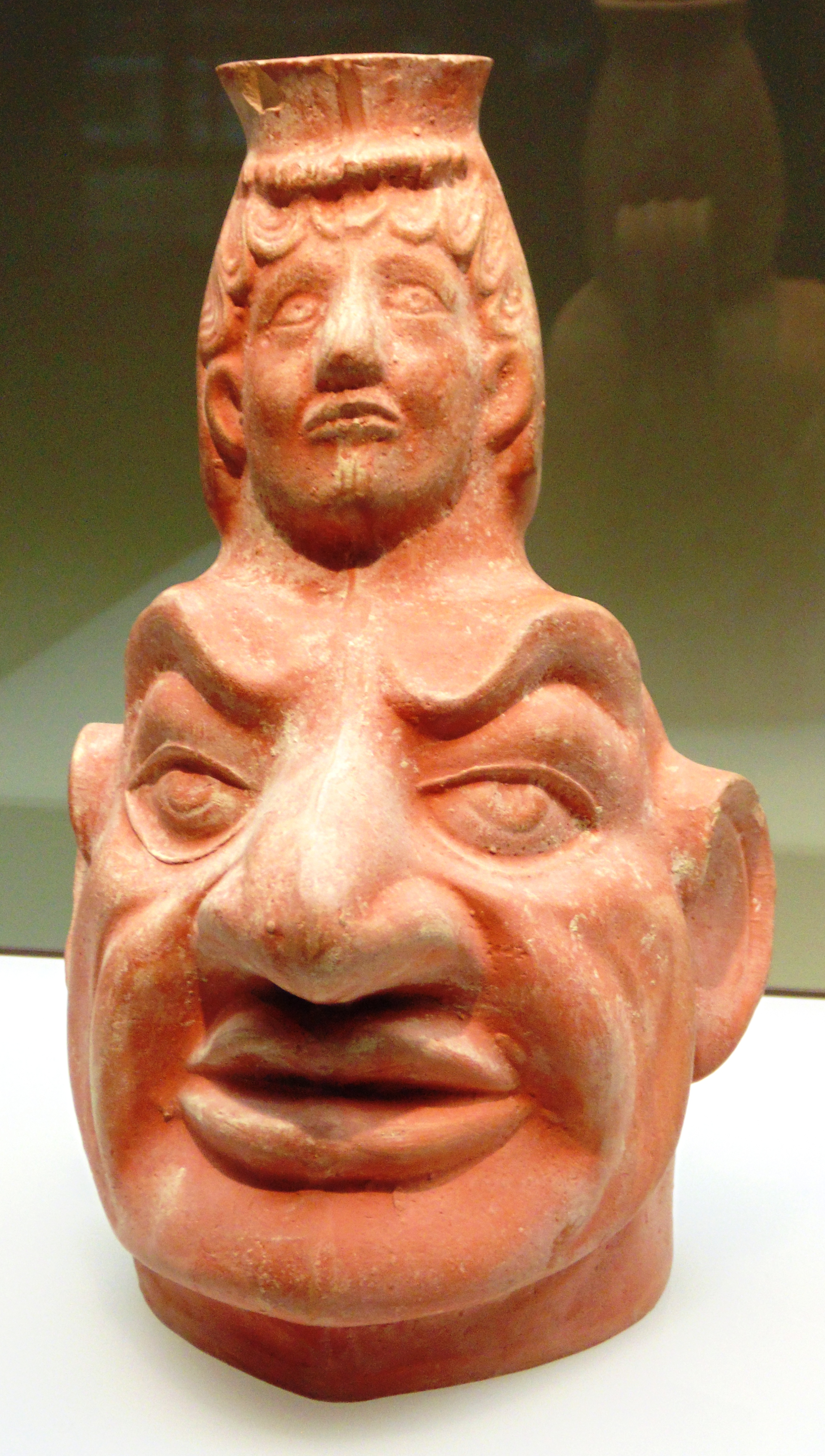
Roman pottery

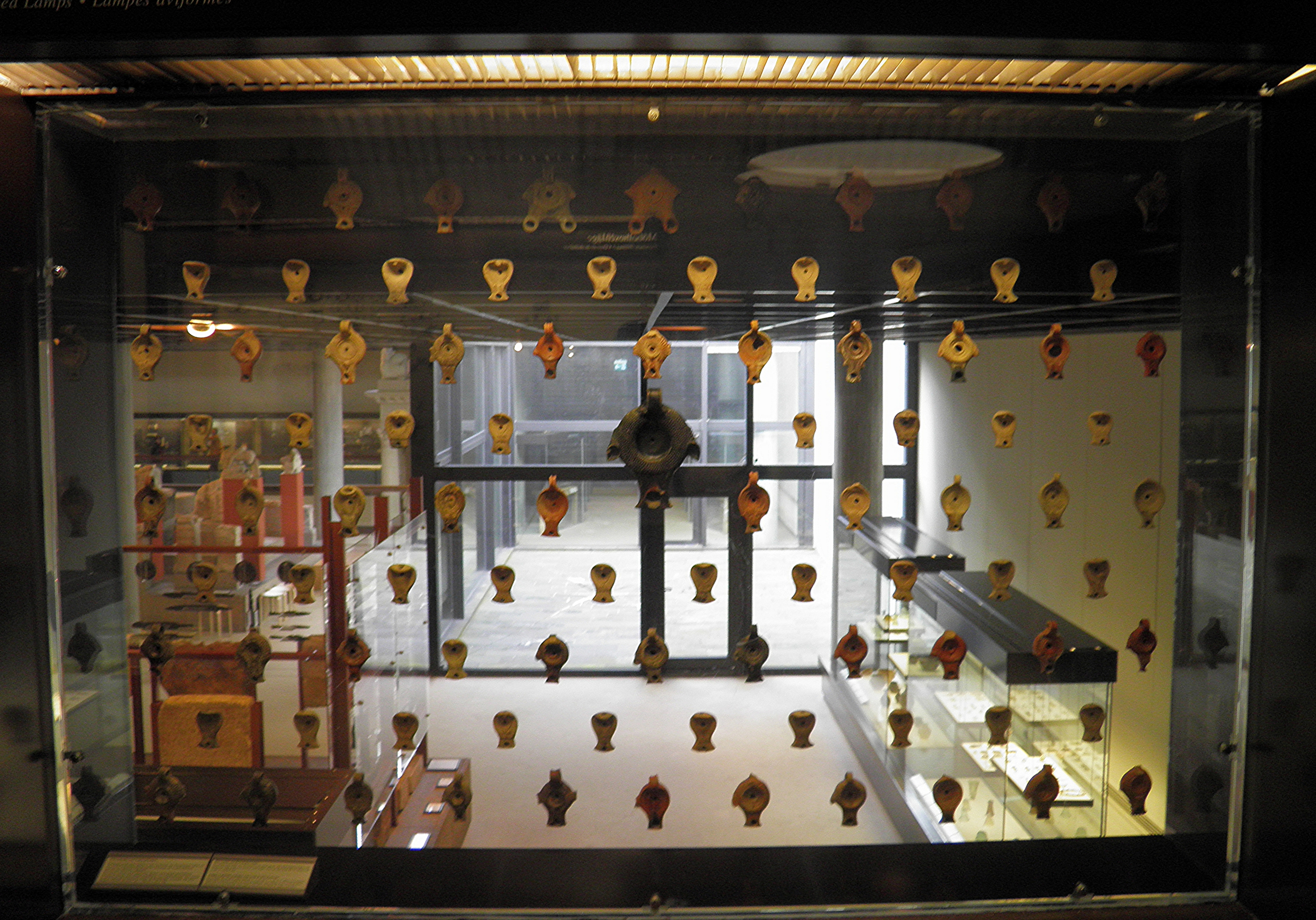
Oil lamps

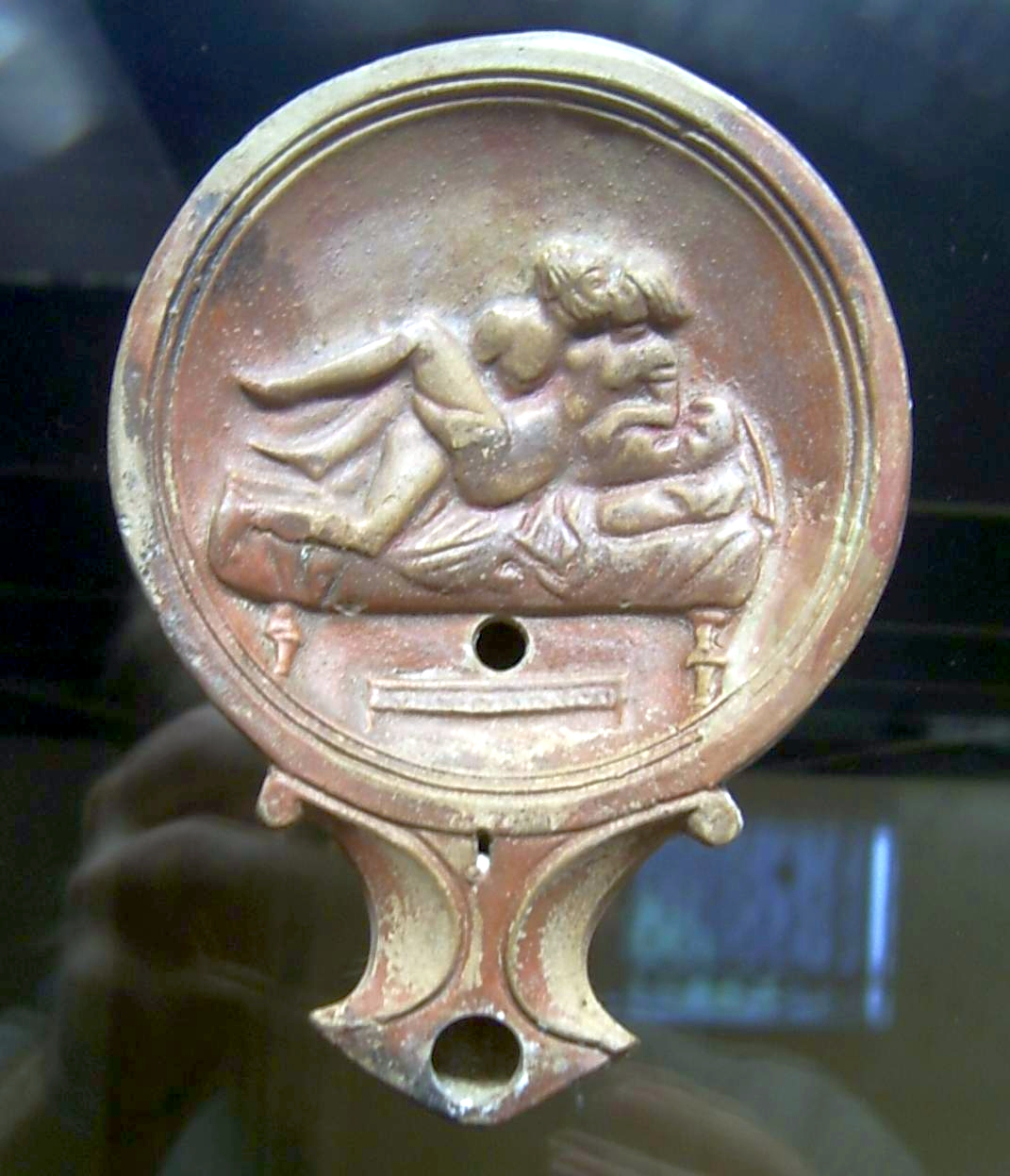
Erotic oil lamp

== Bibliography ==
- Gerta Wolff: The Roman-Germanic Cologne. A Guide to the Roman-Germanic Museum and City of Cologne. J. P. Bachem: Cologne, 2002, ISBN 3-7616-1371-7
