= Sextus Calpurnius Agricola =

2nd century Roman senator, legate and governor

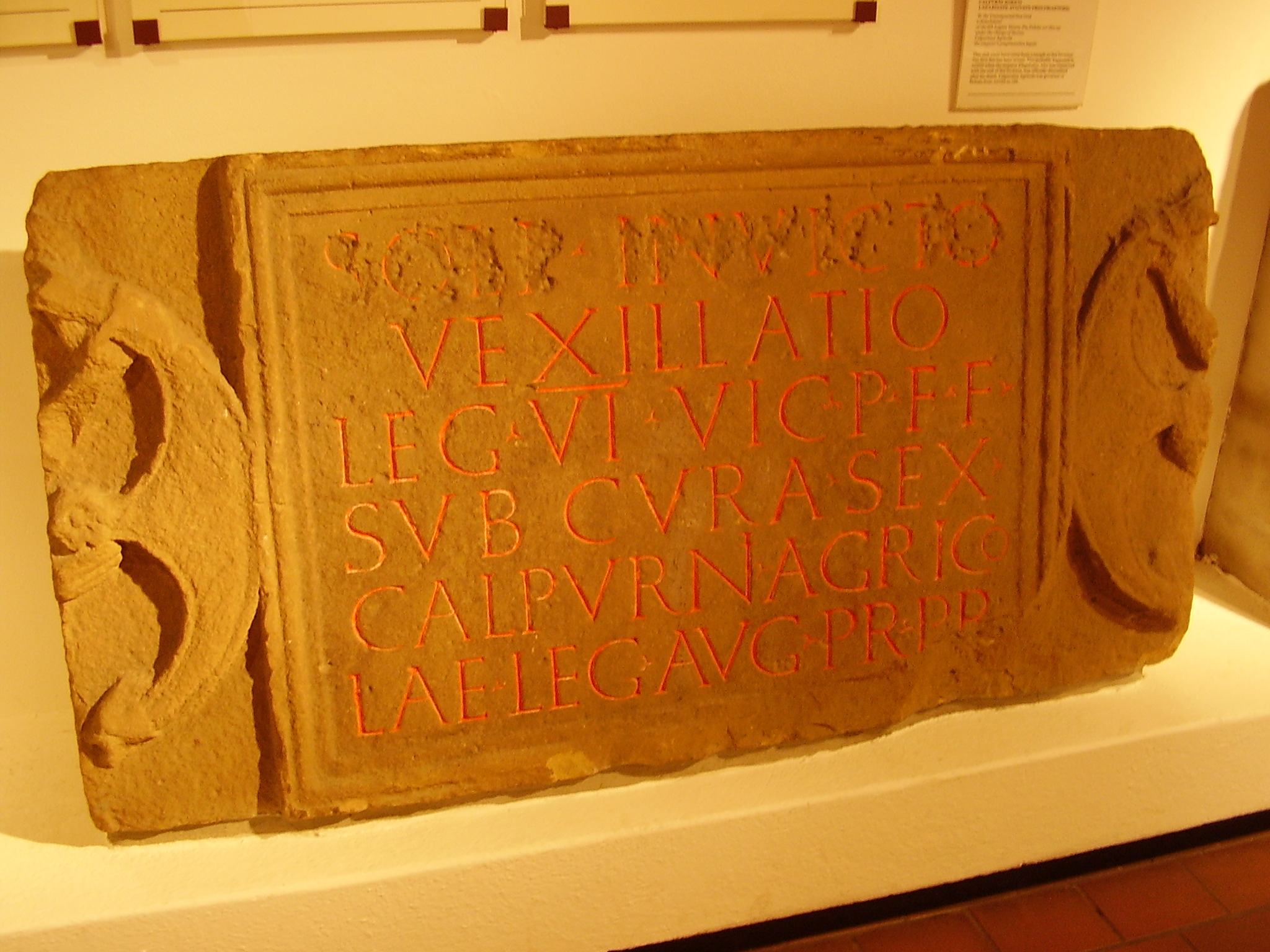
- Dedication to the god Sol Invictus, by a vexillatio of the Legio VI Victrix under the command of Agricola.

Suffect Consul of the Roman Empire
- In office c. September 154 AD – c. October 154 AD
- Preceded by: [? M. Valerius Etrus]cus (?); L. [Aemilius Iuncus?]
- Succeeded by: C. Julius Statius Severus; T. Junius Severus

Governor of Roman Britain
- In office c. 162 AD – c. 166 AD
- Preceded by: Marcus Statius Priscus
- Succeeded by: unknown

Personal details
- Born: c. 125 AD Dacia, Roman Empire
- Died: c. 169 AD (aged 43)

Military service
- Allegiance: Roman Empire
- Years of service: c. 150-170 AD
- Rank: Legate consul suffectus, imperial legate, Governor
- Commands: Germania Superior; Dacia; Moesia

Sextus Calpurnius Agricola was a Roman senator and general active during the 2nd century. He was consul suffectus with Tiberius Claudius Julianus for the nundinium of September-October 154 AD. Agricola is known primarily from inscriptions.

== Life ==
No information has yet been found about Calpurnius Agricola prior to his consulate. His origin is attested in no surviving document, and the gentilicium "Calpurnius" is commonly found all over the Empire. However, Anthony Birley notes the combination "Sextus Calpurnius" is very uncommon, and he suggests that Agricola is related to Fronto's friend Sextus Calpurnius Julianus; if so, he may have been a native of Cirta or another town in Numidia.

Calpurnius Agricola was governor of Germania Superior around 158.

In 161 or 162 he was made governor of Britain and remained until at least 163, possibly until the end of the 160s.

In 163, he was sent to Britain to control uprisings in the north. He rebuilt a number of forts, most notably that at Coria (Corbridge). He withdrew troops southwards from Scotland towards the line of Hadrian's Wall to contend with the threats of further rebellion.

There are indications of unrest in Britain around the time of his rule attested by damage to the forum at Viroconium Cornoviorum (Wroxeter) and the burning of a large part of Verulamium (St Albans).

Around 166 AD Agricola was appointed imperial legate in Roman Dacia. Between 168 and 169, he was one of the governors of Lower Moesia.

== Sources ==
=== Epigraphics ===
- PIR C 249
- CIL VII, 226
- RIB I, 1137

=== Secondary ===
- Patricia Southern, Roman Britain: A New History 55BC - AD 450
- Birley, Anthony (2000). Marcus Aurelius. Roman imperial biographies. London and New York: Routledge. ISBN 978-0-415-17125-0.

Political offices
Preceded by Marcus Valerius Etruscus (?), and Lucius Aemilius Juncus (?) as consules suffecti	Suffect consul of the Roman Empire; 154 with Tiberius Claudius Julianus	Succeeded by Gaius Julius Statius Severus, and Titus Junius Severus as consules suffecti
Preceded by Marcus Statius Priscus	Roman governors of Britain; 161- later in the 160s	Succeeded by Unknown, then Quintus Antistius Adventus
