= Edward Champlin =

American historian (1948–2024)

- Born: 1948; New York City, United States
- Died: December 23, 2024 (aged 76); Flemington, New Jersey, United States
- Education: B.A. History, Toronto 1970; M.A. Classics, Toronto 1972; D.Phil. Literae Humaniores, Oxford 1976
- Occupations: Professor, writer
- Employer: Princeton University
- Spouse: Linda Mahler

Edward James Champlin (1948 – 23 December 2024) was an American classicist. During his career he served as Professor of Classics, Cotsen Professor of Humanities, and Master of Butler College at Princeton University. He taught Roman history and wrote several books on the subject.

== Biography ==
Though born in New York, Champlin grew up in Toronto where he earned his bachelor's degree in modern history and master's in Classics. He received his doctorate at Oxford, and then joined Princeton University the same year. For his shift to Roman history he credited reading Ronald Syme's Roman Revolution as well as his mentors T. D. Barnes, C. P. Jones, and Fergus Millar.

Champlin specialized in Roman history, Roman politics and law, and Latin literature. He taught over 40 courses during his career and wrote various books on Ancient Rome, notably a biography of Emperor Nero and studies of Cornelius Fronto and of modest Roman landowners. His last book, Tiberius and His Age, was begun in 2007 but published in 2024, having been set aside due to illness and then finished by his colleague Robert Kaster. He was also the co-editor of The Cambridge Ancient History, 2nd edition, volume 10, The Augustan Empire, 43 B.C.–A.D. 69 (1996).

== Works ==
- Fronto and Antonine Rome (Harvard University Press, 1980)
- Final Judgments: Duty and Emotion in Roman Wills, 200 B.C.–A.D. 250 (University of California Press, 1991).
- Nero (Cambridge: Belknap Press, 2003). ISBN 0-674-01192-9
- The Cambridge Ancient History. Vol. X. (editor, with A.K. Bowman and A. Lintott)
- The Augustan Empire, 43 B.C. - A.D. 69 (Cambridge University Press, 1996).
- Phaedrus the Fabulous, Journal of Roman Studies 95 (2005) 97-123
- Tiberius the Wise, Historia 57 (2008) 408-425
- My Sejanus, Humanities 31 (2010) 18-21, 52-53
- Tiberius and His Age: Myth, Sex, Luxury, and Power (2024; edited by Robert Kaster)

== Honors and awards ==
- Alexander von Humboldt Fellow, Heidelberg University, 1984-1985
- Corresponding Member at German Archaeological Institute, 1991
- Fowler Hamilton Visiting Research Fellow, Christ Church, Oxford, 1989-1990
- NEH Fellow, 2007-2008
- Resident in Classics, American Academy in Rome, 1994
