= Robert A. Kaster =

American classicist and retired academic

Robert A. Kaster FAAS FBA (born 1948) is an American classicist and retired academic. He was a professor of classics and the Kennedy Foundation Professor of Latin at Princeton University from 1997 to 2018.

== Life ==
Born in 1948, Robert A. Kaster graduated from Dartmouth College in 1969, then secured an MA and a PhD from Harvard University (in 1971 and 1975 respectively).

Kaster was a teaching fellow in classics at Harvard from 1972 to 1973, then an instructor at Colby College until 1974. He joined the faculty at the University of Chicago in 1975 as an assistant professor; promoted to associate professor in 1982 and a full professorship in 1989, Kaster was appointed Avalon Foundation Distinguished Service Professor in the Humanities at Chicago in 1996. In 1997, he moved to Princeton University to take up the positions of professor of classics and Kennedy Foundation Professor of Latin. He retired in 2018, and remains an emeritus professor at Princeton as of 2024. Kaster's research has focused on "Roman rhetoric, the history of ancient education, Roman ethics, and textual criticism".

== Published works ==
=== Monographs ===
- Robert A. Kaster, Guardians of Language: The Grammarian and Society in Late Antiquity, The Transformation of the Classical Heritage, vol. 11 (Los Angeles and London: University of California Press, 1988)
- Robert A. Kaster, The Tradition of the Text of the Aeneid in the Ninth Century, Harvard Dissertations in the Classics (New York: Garland Publishing Inc., 1990)
- Robert A. Kaster, Studies on the Text of Suetonius' De Grammaticis et Rhetoribus, The American Philological Association: American Classical Studies, vol. 28 (Atlanta: Scholars Press, 1992)
- Robert A. Kaster, Emotion, Restraint, and Community in Ancient Rome (New York: Oxford University Press, 2005)
- Robert A. Kaster, Studies on the Text of Macrobius' Saturnalia, The American Philological Association Monograph Series (New York: Oxford University Press, 2010)
- Robert A. Kaster, The Appian Way: Ghost Road, Queen of Roads, Culture Trails (Chicago: University of Chicago Press, 2012)
- Robert A. Kaster, Studies on the Text of Suestonius' De Uita Caesarum(Oxford: Oxford University Press, 2016)
- Robert A. Kaster, Studies on the Text of Seneca's De Beneficiis (Oxford: Oxford University Press, 2022)

=== Edited collections of essays ===
- Ruth R. Caston; Robert A. Kaster (eds), Hope, Joy, and Affection in the Classical World, Emotions of the Past (New York: Oxford University Press, 2016)

=== Editions of classical texts ===
- Suetonius; Robert A. Kaster (ed.), Suetonius: De Grammaticis et Rhetoribus (Oxford: Clarendon Press, 1995)
- Cicero; Robert A. Kaster (ed.), Cicero: Speech on Behalf of Publius Sestius, Clarendon Ancient History (Oxford: Clarendon Press, 2006)
- Seneca; Robert A. Kaster (ed.), Seneca: Anger, Mercy, Revenge (Chicago: The University of Chicago Press, 2010)
- Macrobius; Robert A. Kaster (ed.), Macrobius: The Saturnalia, The Loeb Classical Library (Cambridge, MA: Harvard University Press, 2011)
- Macrobius; Robert A. Kaster (ed.), Macrobii Ambrosii Theodosii Saturnalia, Oxford Classical Texts (Oxford: Clarendon Press, 2011)
- Suetonius; Robert A. Kaster (ed.), C. Suetoni Tranquilli De Uita Caesarum Libri VIII et De Grammaticis et Rhetoribus Liber, Oxford Classical Texts (Oxford: Clarendon Press, 2016)
- Servius; Charles E. Murgia (ed.); Robert A. Kaster (ed.), Serviani in Vergili Carmina Commentarii: Commentarii in Aeneidos Libros IX–XII, Special Publications of the Society for Classical Studies (New York: Oxford University Press, 2018)
- Cicero; Robert A. Kaster (ed. and trans.), Cicero: Brutus and Orator (New York: Oxford University Press, 2020)
- Lucius Annaeus Seneca; Robert A. Kaster (ed.), Lucius Annaeus Seneca: De Beneficiis, De Clementia, Apocolocyntosis, Oxford Classical Texts (Oxford: Clarendon Press, 2022)
- Seneca; Robert A. Kaster (ed.), How to Do the Right Thing: An Ancient Guide to Treating People Fairly, Ancient Wisdom for Modern Readers (Princeton: Princeton University Press, 2023)
- Cicero; Robert A. Kaster (ed.), Cicero: Tusculan Disputations, Oxford Classical Texts (Oxford: Clarendon Press, 2026)
