= Fronto of Emesa =

3rd-century Greek rhetorician

Fronto of Emesa (Ancient Greek: Φρόντων ὀ Εμισηνός, romanized: Phróntōn ho Emisēnós) was a famous Greek rhetorician and uncle of Cassius Longinus. Fronto taught rhetoric in Athens. He was born in Emesa. He died in Athens, aged about 60. He is mentioned in Suda.
