= Pacorus of Armenia =

King of Armenia from 161 to 163

Bakur

King of Armenia
- Reign: 161–163
- Predecessor: Sohaemus
- Successor: Sohaemus
- Dynasty: Arsacid dynasty
- Father: Vologases IV
- Religion: Zoroastrianism

Bakur, also known as Aurelius Pacorus or Pacorus (Latinized: Bacurius, Aurelius Pacorus Greek: Αύρήλιος Πάκορος) was a Parthian Prince who served as one of the Kings of Armenia in the 2nd century.

== Biography ==
Bakur was also considered a Parthian prince․ He was the son of the Parthian King Vologases IV (147-191)․ In one of the Greek inscriptions, Bakur describes himself as:

Aurelius Pacorus, King of Greater Armenia (Αύρήλιος Πάκορος βασιλεύς μεγάλης Άρμενίας)․

Inscriptions reveal that Bakur's brother, Mithridates, lived and died in Rome․ They also indicate that Bakur lived in Rome for some time along with members of his family․

The use of the name "Aurelius" testifies to his close connection with the imperial house of the Nerva-Antonine dynasty․ After some time, Bakur and his brother were granted Roman citizenship by the Nerva-Antonine dynasty․ It is possible that citizenship was granted by Lucius Verus, either before Bakur's accession to the Armenian throne or after it․

His Parthian origin underscored the Empire's steady influence over Armenia as a frontier state, where Parthian kings, such as Vologases I, appointed relatives to the throne to resist Roman expansion․

== Reign in Armenia ==
Bakur was the only Armenian king to be placed on the throne by the ruling monarch of Parthia, only to be later deposed by the Roman authorities․

During the Roman–Parthian War of 161–166, the Parthian King Vologases IV invaded Armenia in 161/162, which at the time was under the influence of the Roman Empire. Following the death of Roman Emperor Antoninus Pius, and under the leadership of General Chosroes, Vologases IV overthrew the Roman-backed Armenian king, Sohaemus, and appointed the pro-Parthian Bakur to the Armenian throne․

Sohaemus has also been identified as "Achaemenid and Arsacid, a king born of royal ancestors." He had to be restored by the Romans at least once, and the exact duration of his reign remains uncertain․

This appointment reflected the Parthian Kingdom's strategy of placing Arsacid relatives on allied thrones to counteract Roman influence, as the Armenian monarchy had long been contested between the two empires. Bakur's reign in Armenia, approximately from 161 to 163 AD, is characterized by a scarcity of detailed records regarding domestic governance, as ancient historians such as Cassius Dio prioritized accounts of external conflicts over internal administration.

His rule serves as evidence of frequent Parthian interventions in the Armenian royal succession, aimed at installing the Arsacid dynasty to maintain influence over the buffer kingdom amidst the Roman–Parthian rivalry․

== Deposition and military events ==
The Romans attempted to transform Armenia into a Roman province by capturing the country and its capital, Artaxata. However, these plans were thwarted due to the rebellion of the Armenian prince Tiridates․

Following Bakur's deposition, Sohaemus was briefly restored to power in Armenia․ Bakur's subsequent fate is not clearly known, though some hypotheses suggest he was taken to Rome by Lucius Verus․

During his brief reign until 163 AD, Bakur cooperated closely with Parthian interests, benefiting from their military support during the initial phases of the Roman–Parthian War (161–166). Historical records testify to the friendly Parthian-Armenian ties under Arsacid rule, with no documented conflicts between the two, as their shared ethnic and dynastic heritage fostered cooperation rather than rivalry. Parthian support allowed Bakur to maintain Artaxata as a stronghold against Roman advances․

Bakur had a tomb constructed in Rome for his brother, Mithridates, the inscription of which has been preserved to this day and reads as follows:

"To the gods of the underworld: I, Aurelius Pacorus, King of Greater Armenia, purchased this tomb for my sweetest brother, Aurelius Mithridates, who lived with me for fifty-six years and two months"․

== The Roman-Parthian struggle over Armenia ==
Parthian King Vologases IV established control over the country after Marcus Sedatius Severianus, the governor of Cappadocia, committed suicide following his defeat at Elegeia․

After the death of Vologases I, for reasons unknown to us, Roman hegemony was re-established in Armenia. In 140 AD, Emperor Antoninus Pius (138–161) appointed Sohaemus, a member of the Roman Senate, as King of Armenia (first reign: 140–161). The historian Movses Khorenatsi refers to him as Tigran. Sohaemus was not of Arsacid descent but belonged to the royal dynasty of Emesa (modern-day Homs)․

The accession of Sohaemus-Tigran in Armenia was an explicit violation of the Treaty of Rhandeia by the Romans and could not be long-tolerated by the Parthians. In 161 AD, Parthian forces invaded Armenia, decisively defeated the Roman legions, and expelled Sohaemus. The Armenian crown was once again granted to Bakur․

The Romans dispatched new troops from Cappadocia to Armenia, but they were defeated by the joint Armenian-Parthian forces․

To repel the Parthians and restore Roman dominance, Emperor Marcus Aurelius (161–180) sent his co-emperor and brother, Lucius Verus (161–169), with a massive force to lead the military operations․

In the summer of 163 AD, a Roman army led by General Marcus Statius Priscus invaded Armenia via Cappadocia and conquered it after fierce battles. During that summer, Roman forces launched offensives not only in Armenia but also in Syria and Mesopotamia. This conflict, officially known as the Roman–Parthian War, was fought on two fronts: Artaxata and Ctesiphon․

By the end of the same year, the Romans captured Artaxata and destroyed it once again. King Bakur was taken prisoner and sent to Rome, where he was adopted into the royal Aurelian family and eventually died․

Following the conquest of Armenia and the fall of Artaxata, General Martius Verus, who succeeded Statius Priscus, reinstated Sohaemus to the throne in place of the deposed Bakur. Sohaemus, as a member of the Roman Senate, acted more as a Roman official than an independent monarch. Under Martius's orders, Thucydides led him back to Armenia in 164 AD․

To commemorate these victories, a large quantity of gold, silver, and copper coins were minted in Rome, many of which have been preserved to this day. These coins depict the heads of Marcus Aurelius or Lucius Verus on one side, while the reverse features various symbols of Armenia. For instance, a sorrowful woman is shown seated before a Roman standard with the inscription Armenia below. In other versions, Armenia is represented by an Armenian man being threatened by the Emperor holding a spear. Particularly noteworthy are the gold and silver coins of Lucius Verus from 164 and 165 AD; they depict the Emperor seated on a throne, surrounded by Roman soldiers, placing a crown on the head of the Armenian King. The image is encircled by the inscription: "A king given to the Armenians" (Rex Armeniis datus)․

== See also ==
- Roman–Parthian War of 161–166
- Emperorship of Marcus Aurelius

== Sources ==
- Schottky, Martin (2010). "Armenische Arsakiden zur Zeit der Antonine. Ein Beitrag zur Korrektur der armenischen Königsliste". ANABASIS Studia Classica et Orientalia. 1: 208–224. ISSN 2082-8993. (in German)
- Federico, Frasson (2016). "Armenia and Armenians in Asinius Quadratus' Παρθικά". In Traina, Giusto; Pagani, Lara; Gazzano, Francesca (eds.). Greek Texts and Armenian Traditions: An Interdisciplinary Approach. De Gruyter. pp. 163–194. ISBN 9783110488661.
- Juntunen, Kai (2014). "The Arrogant Armenian – Tiridates (Bagratuni) in Cassius Dio and Movses Khorenats'i". Arctos - Acta Philologica Fennica. 47: 153–172. ISSN 0570-734X.
- Russell, James R. (1987). Zoroastrianism in Armenia. Harvard University Press. ISBN 978-0674968509.
- D. Braund, Rome and the Friendly King: The Character of the Client Kingship, Taylor & Francis, 1984
- A. De Jong, Traditions of the Magi: Zoroastrianism in Greek and Latin Literature, BRILL, 1997
- M.C. Fronto & M.P.J. Van Den Hout, A Commentary on the Letters of M. Cornelius Fronto, BRILL, 1999
- A. Birley, Marcus Aurelius, Routledge, 2000
- R.G. Hovannisian, The Armenian People From Ancient to Modern Times, Volume I: The Dynastic Periods: From Antiquity to the Fourteenth Century, Palgrave Macmillan, 2004

Pacorus of Armenia Arsacid dynasty Born: unknown Died: 163
Preceded by Sohaemus 144-161	Bakur; 161–163	Succeeded by Sohaemus 164-186
