= Sedatia gens =

Ancient Roman family

The gens Sedatia, occasionally written Sedata, was a plebeian family at ancient Rome, which flourished from the first to the third century. The only member of this gens known to have held a seat in the Roman senate was Marcus Sedatius Severianus, consul suffectus in AD 153.

The Sedatii were an influential mercantile family, whose wealth was based on commerce along the Loire, and had interests in Ostia. The social and political rise of the Sedatii parallels the decline of the aristocratic Julii, who had been the leading class in Roman Gaul since the time of the Julio-Claudian dynasty. The likely marriage of Gaius Sedatius Severus and Julia Rufina might have contributed to the ascendency of winemakers and landowners, who became the leading class in Gaul until the Flavians.

== Origin ==
The Sedatii seem to have been a Gallic family, which probably obtained Roman citizenship some time during the early Empire. The nomen Sedatius seems to be derived from the name of a Celtic god, Sedatus, of whom little is known, but who is mentioned in a series of inscriptions from the Danubian provinces. The transformation of a theonym into a personal name was typical of Gallic practice, but the development of original gentilicia at this early date was highly unusual. Cassius Dio relates that newly enrolled citizens in the time of Claudius were expected to assume the imperial gentilicium, unless the emperor granted them permission to bear another name, and no exceptions are known prior to the time of Vespasian. Original gentilicia were much more typical of the second century, when such names were very common in the provinces.

== Praenomina ==
The only praenomina associated with the Sedatii are Gaius and Marcus, two of the most common names throughout all periods of Roman history.

== Branches and cognomina ==
The only distinct family of the Sedatii bore the cognomen Severus, and its derivative, Severianus. Severus, meaning "stern, serious, austere", or "severe", belongs to a class of old Roman surnames, derived from the characteristics and habits of individuals.

== Members ==
This list includes abbreviated praenomina. For an explanation of this practice, see filiation.

=== Sedatii Severi ===
- Gaius Sedatius Severus, the father of Marcus Sedatius Severianus, was probably born about AD 75.
- Marcus Sedatius C. f. Severianus Julius Acer Metillius Nepos Rufinus Tiberius Rutilianus Censor, consul suffectus in AD 153, and governor of Cappadocia at the beginning of the Parthian War of Lucius Verus. Severianus took his own life after his army was besieged at Elegeia in 161.
- Marcus Sedatus M. f. C. n. Severus Julius Reginus Gallus, the son of Marcus Sedatius Severianus.

=== Others ===
- Gaius Sedatius Florus, secretary for the administration of Portus Namnetum, with Marcus Gemellius Secundus, early in the second century AD.
- Marcus Sedatius Myro, together with his brother, Apollinaris, dedicated a tomb at Rome to his daughter, Sedatia Pollina.
- Sedatia M. f. Pollina, buried at Rome, in a tomb dedicated by her father, Marcus Sedatius Myro, and uncle, Apollinaris.
- Gaius Sedatius Velleius Priscus Macrinus, an imperial legate in Bithynia during the reign of Claudius Gothicus. He was honoured with a statue at Palmyra.
- Gaius Sedatius Stephanus, (Note: Stephanus seems to have been adopted into the gens Sedatia, for none of his children bear the name.) a decurion of the Civitatis Taunensium in Germania Superior, in AD 240.
- Gaius Sedatius, named in an inscription from Virunum in Noricum.
- Sedatius Agathonicus, dedicated a tomb at Lugdunum in Gallia Lugdunensis for his father, Claudius Agathyrsus, aged seventy years, five months, and ten days.
- Sedatia Bassina, named in a libationary inscription honoring Jupiter Optimus Maximus and Juno Regina, from Nida in Germania Superior.
- Sedatia Blandula, named in an inscription honoring Mercury at Andematunum in Gallia Belgica.
- Sedatius Gratus, named in a funerary inscription from Mogontiacum in Germania Superior.
- Sedatius Martius, husband of Olympias and father of Martia, a girl buried at Rome, aged eleven years, [... months?], and twenty-five days.
- Sedatia Primitiva, the wife of Libertius Decimianus, and mother of Libertia Primula, buried at Lugdunum, aged forty-five years, having been married for sixteen years.

== See also ==
- List of Roman gentes

== Bibliography ==
- Theodor Mommsen et alii, Corpus Inscriptionum Latinarum (The Body of Latin Inscriptions, abbreviated CIL), Berlin-Brandenburgische Akademie der Wissenschaften (1853–present).
- René Cagnat et alii, L'Année épigraphique (The Year in Epigraphy, abbreviated AE), Presses Universitaires de France (1888–present).
- (in French) Société nationale des antiquaires de France, Mémoires de la Société nationale des antiquaires de France, (1886).
- George Davis Chase, "The Origin of Roman Praenomina", in Harvard Studies in Classical Philology, vol. VIII, pp. 103–184 (1897).
- Paul von Rohden, Elimar Klebs, & Hermann Dessau, Prosopographia Imperii Romani (The Prosopography of the Roman Empire, abbreviated PIR), Berlin (1898).
- Annona Epigraphica Austriaca (Epigraphy of Austria Annual, abbreviated AEA) (1979–present).
- (in French) Gilbert Charles-Picard, "Ostie et la Gaule de l'Ouest", in Mélanges de l'École française de Rome, vol. 93, No. 2, pp. 883–915 (1981).
- Bernard Rémy, Les carrières sénatoriales dans les provinces romaines d'Anatolie, Istanbul-Paris (1989).
- (in French) Jacqueline Champeaux, Martine Chassignet, Aere perennius: en hommage à Hubert Zehnacker (2006).
