= Reign of Marcus Aurelius =

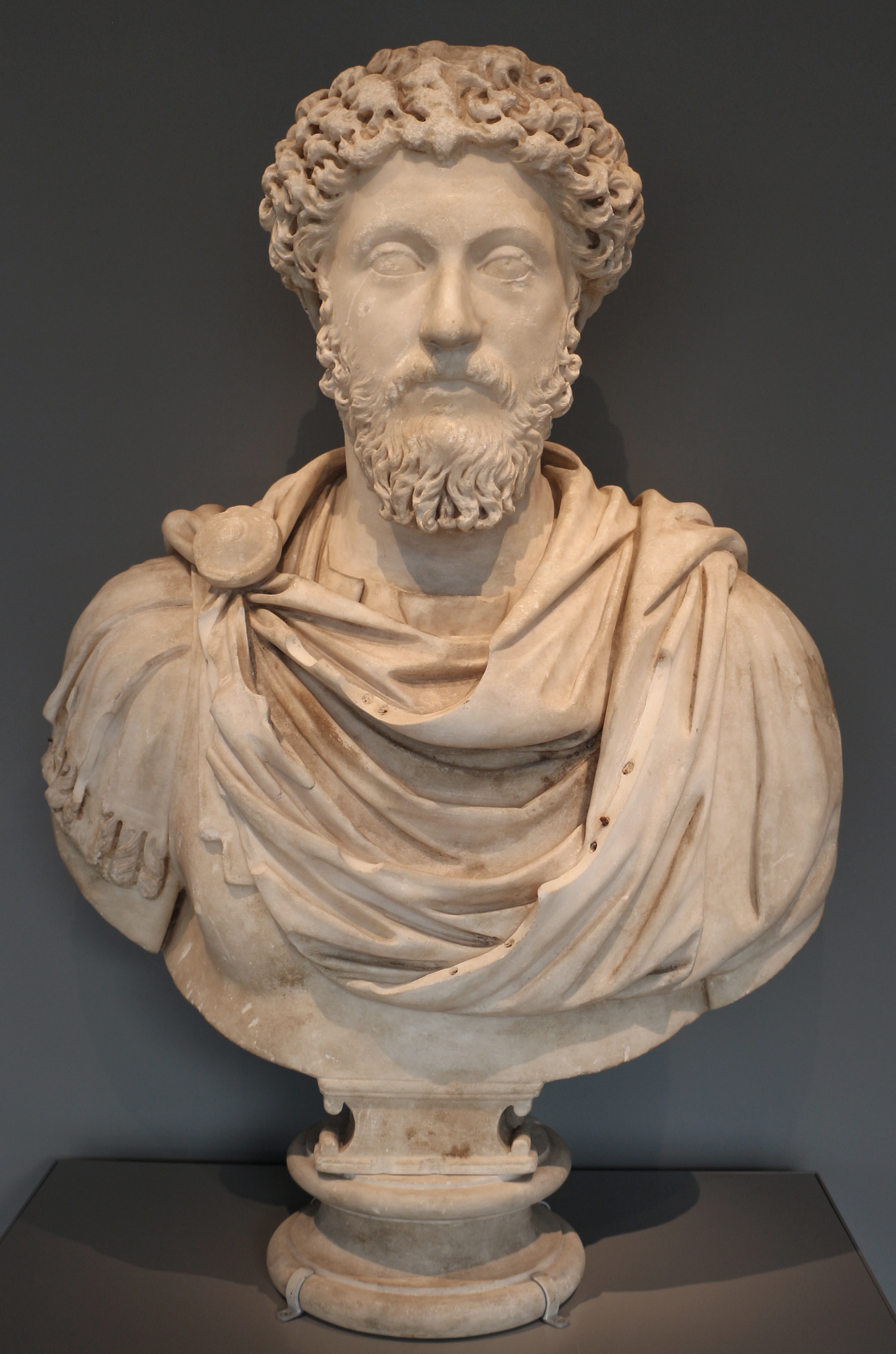
Bust, Art Institute of Chicago

The reign of Marcus Aurelius began with his accession on 7 March 161 following the death of his adoptive father, Antoninus Pius, and ended with his own death on 17 March 180. Marcus first ruled jointly with his adoptive brother, Lucius Verus. They shared the throne until Lucius' death in 169. Marcus was succeeded by his son Commodus, who had been made co-emperor in 177.

Under Marcus, Rome fought the Roman–Parthian War of 161–66 and the Marcomannic Wars. The so-called Antonine plague occurred during his reign. In the last years of his rule, Marcus composed his personal writings on Stoic philosophy known as Meditations.

== Sources ==
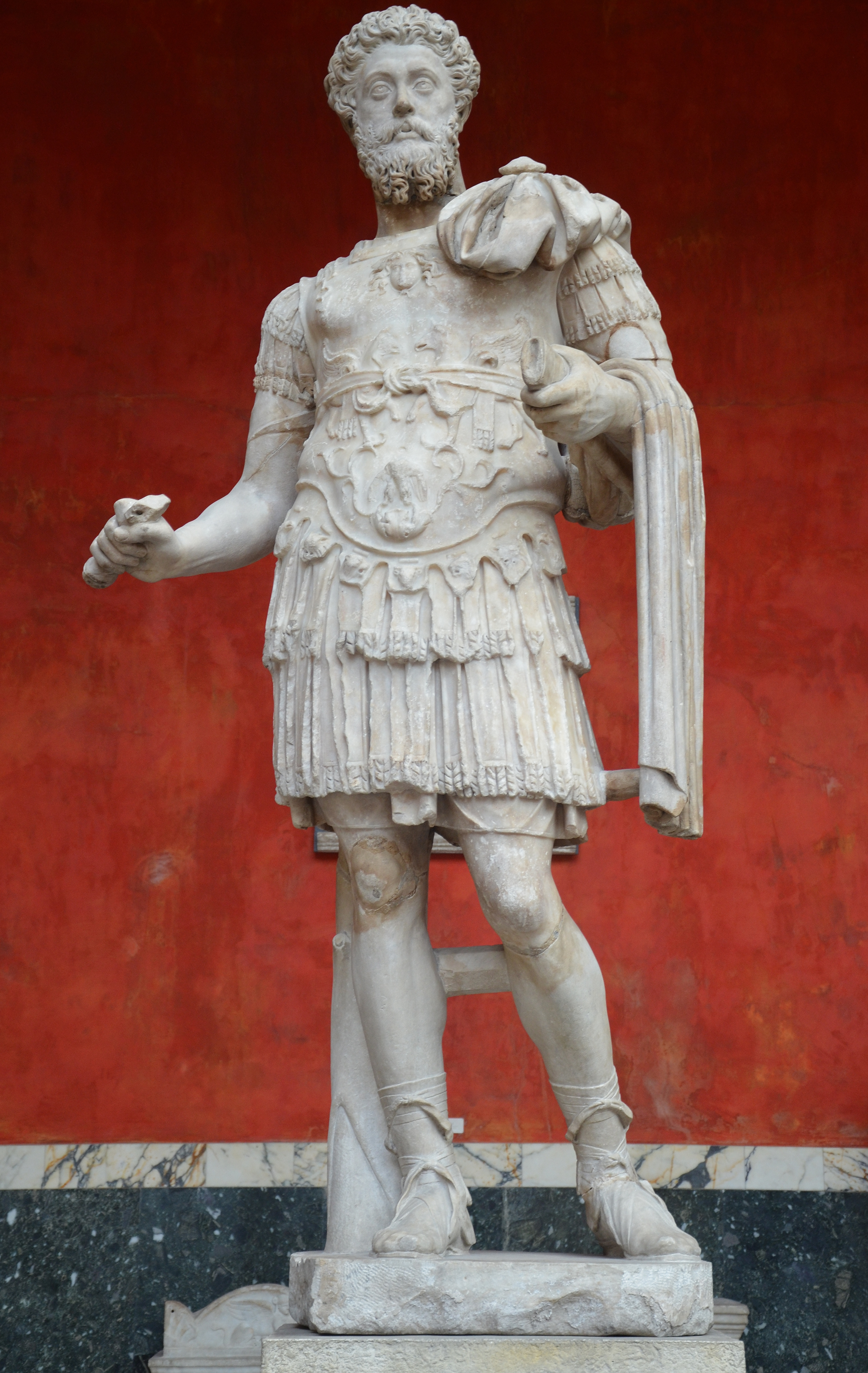
Marble statue of Marcus Aurelius in the Ny Carlsberg Glyptotek, Copenhagen

The major sources for the life and rule of Marcus are patchy and frequently unreliable. The biographies contained in the Historia Augusta claim to be written by a group of authors at the turn of the 4th century, but are in fact written by a single author (referred to here as "the biographer of the Historia Augusta") from the later 4th century (c. 395). The later biographies and the biographies of subordinate emperors and usurpers consist largely of lies and fiction, but the earlier biographies, derived primarily from now-lost earlier sources (Marius Maximus or Ignotus) are much more reliable. For Marcus Aurelius' life and rule, the biographies of Hadrian, Pius, Marcus and Lucius Verus are largely reliable, but those of Aelius Verus and Avidius Cassius are partly invented.

A body of correspondence between Marcus Aurelius' tutor Marcus Cornelius Fronto and various Antonine officials survives in a series of patchy manuscripts, covering the period from c. 138 to 166. Marcus' own Meditations offer a window on his inner life, but are largely undateable, and make few specific references to worldly affairs. The main narrative source for the period is Cassius Dio, a Greek senator from Bithynian Nicaea who wrote a history of Rome from its founding to 229 in eighty books. Dio is vital for the military history of the period, but his senatorial prejudices and strong opposition to imperial expansion obscure his perspective. Some other literary sources provide specific detail: the writings of the physician Galen on the habits of the Antonine elite, the orations of Aelius Aristides on the temper of the times, and the constitutions preserved in the Digest and Codex Justinianus on Marcus' legal work. Inscriptions and coin finds supplement the literary sources.

== Accession of Marcus and Lucius (161) ==
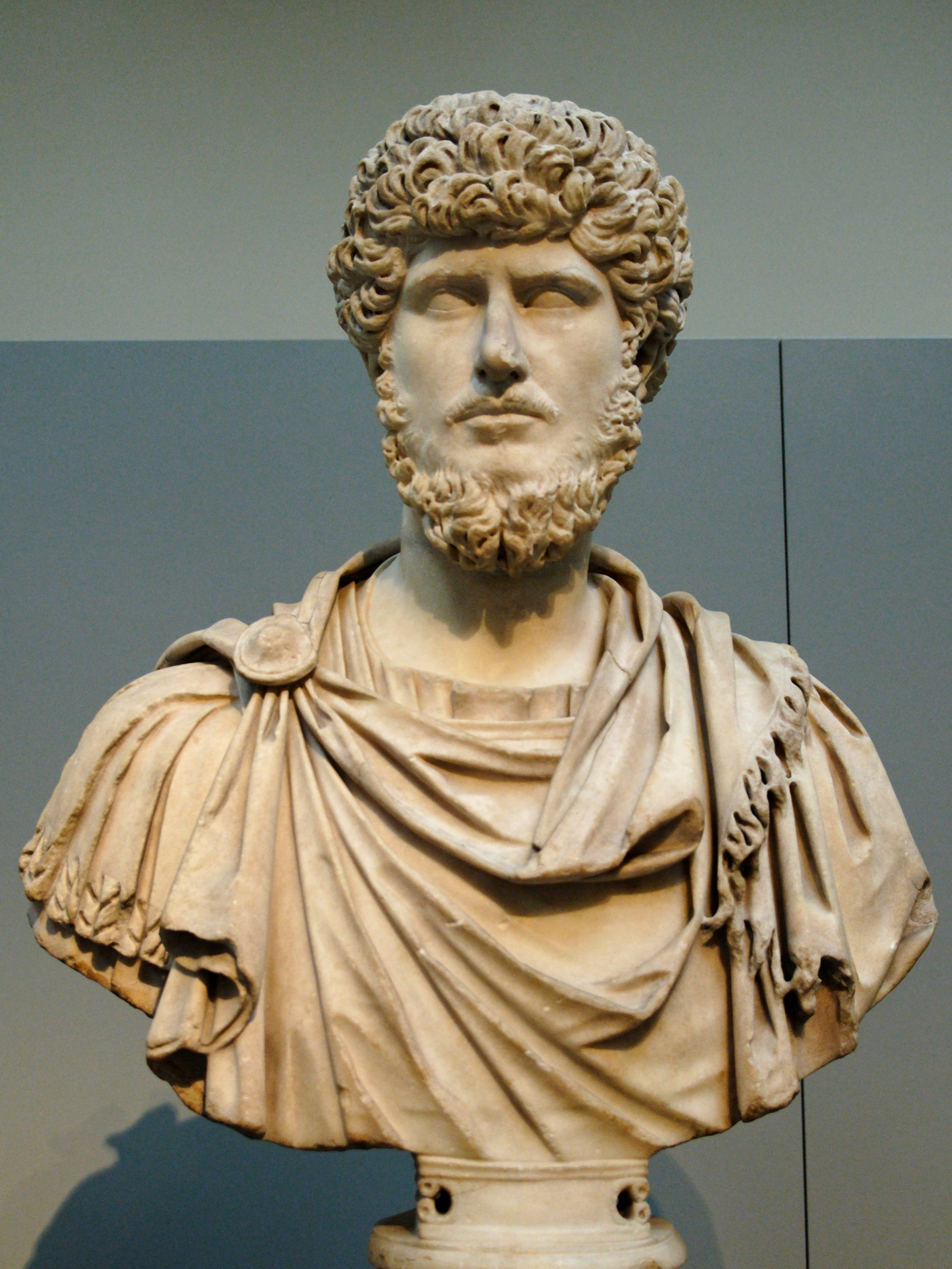
Lucius Verus, Aurelius' co-emperor from 161 to Verus' death in 169, British Museum

At the death of Antoninus Pius, Marcus was effectively sole ruler of the Empire. The formalities of the position would follow: The senate would soon grant him the name Augustus and the title imperator, and he would soon be formally elected as Pontifex Maximus, chief priest of the official cults. Marcus made some show of resistance: the biographer of the Historia Augusta writes that he was "compelled" to take imperial power. This may have been a genuine horror imperii, "fear of imperial power". Marcus, with his preference for the philosophic life, found the imperial office unappealing. His training as a Stoic, however, had made the choice clear. It was his duty.

Although Marcus shows no personal affection for Hadrian (significantly, he does not thank him in the first book of his Meditations), he presumably believed it his duty to enact the man's succession plans. Thus, although the senate planned to confirm Marcus Aurelius alone, he refused to take office unless Lucius, the son of Hadrian's long deceased chosen heir L. Aelius, received equal powers. The senate accepted, granting Lucius the imperium, the tribunician power, and the name Augustus. Marcus became, in official titulature, Imperator Caesar Marcus Aurelius Antoninus Augustus; Lucius, forgoing his name Commodus and taking Marcus Aurelius' family name, Verus, became Imperator Caesar Lucius Aurelius Verus Augustus. (Note: These name-swaps have proven so confusing that even the Historia Augusta, our main source for the period, cannot keep them straight. The fourth-century ecclesiastical historian Eusebius of Caesarea shows even more confusion. The mistaken belief that Lucius had the name "Verus" before becoming emperor has proven especially popular.) It was the first time that Rome was ruled by two emperors. (Note: There was, however, much precedent. The consulate was a twin magistracy, and earlier emperors had often had a subordinate lieutenant with many imperial offices (under Pius, the lieutenant had been Marcus). Many emperors had planned a joint succession in the past—Augustus planned to leave Gaius Caesar and Lucius Caesar as joint emperors on his death; Tiberius wished to have Gaius Caligula and Tiberius Gemellus do so as well; Claudius left the empire to Nero and Britannicus, imagining that they would accept equal rank—but all of these arrangements had ended in failure, either through premature death (Gaius and Lucius Caesar) or judicial murder (Gemellus by Caligula and Britannicus by Nero).)

In spite of their nominal equality, Marcus held more auctoritas, or "authority", than Verus. He had been consul once more than Verus, he had shared in Pius' administration, and he alone was Pontifex Maximus. It would have been clear to the public which emperor was the more senior. As the biographer of the Historia Augusta wrote, "Verus obeyed Marcus...as a lieutenant obeys a proconsul or a governor obeys the emperor."

Immediately after their senate confirmation, the emperors proceeded to the Castra Praetoria, the camp of the Praetorian Guard. Lucius addressed the assembled troops, which then acclaimed the pair as imperatores, and like every new emperor since Claudius, promised the troops a special donative. This donative, however, was twice the size of those past: 20,000 sesterces (5,000 denarii) per capita, more to officers. In return for this bounty, equivalent to several years' pay, the troops swore an oath to protect the emperors. The ceremony was perhaps not entirely necessary, given that Marcus' accession had been peaceful and unopposed, but it was good insurance against later military troubles.

Pius' funeral ceremonies were, in the words of the biographer of the Historia Augusta, "elaborate". If his funeral followed the pattern of past funerals, his body would have been incinerated on a pyre at the Campus Martius, while his spirit would rise to the gods' home in the heavens. Marcus and Lucius nominated their father for deification. In contrast to their behavior during Pius' campaign to deify Hadrian, the senate did not oppose the emperors' wishes. A flamen, or cultic priest, was appointed to minister the cult of the deified Pius, now Divus Antoninus. Pius' remains were laid to rest in Hadrian's mausoleum, beside the remains of Marcus' children and of Hadrian himself. The temple Pius had dedicated to his wife, Diva Faustina, became the Temple of Antoninus and Faustina. It survives as the church of San Lorenzo in Miranda.

In accordance with his will, Pius' fortune passed on to Faustina. (Marcus had little need of his wife's fortune. Indeed, at his accession, he transferred part of his mother's estate to his nephew, Ummius Quadratus.) Faustina was three months pregnant at her husband's accession. During the pregnancy she dreamed of giving birth to two serpents, one fiercer than the other. On 31 August she gave birth at Lanuvium to twins: T. Aurelius Fulvus Antoninus and Lucius Aurelius Commodus. (Note: the biographer of the Historia Augusta relates the scurrilous (and, in the judgment of Anthony Birley, untrue) rumor that Commodus was an illegitimate child born of a union between Faustina and a gladiator.) Aside from the fact that the twins shared Caligula's birthday, the omens were favorable, and the astrologers drew positive horoscopes for the children. The births were celebrated on the imperial coinage.

== Early rule ==
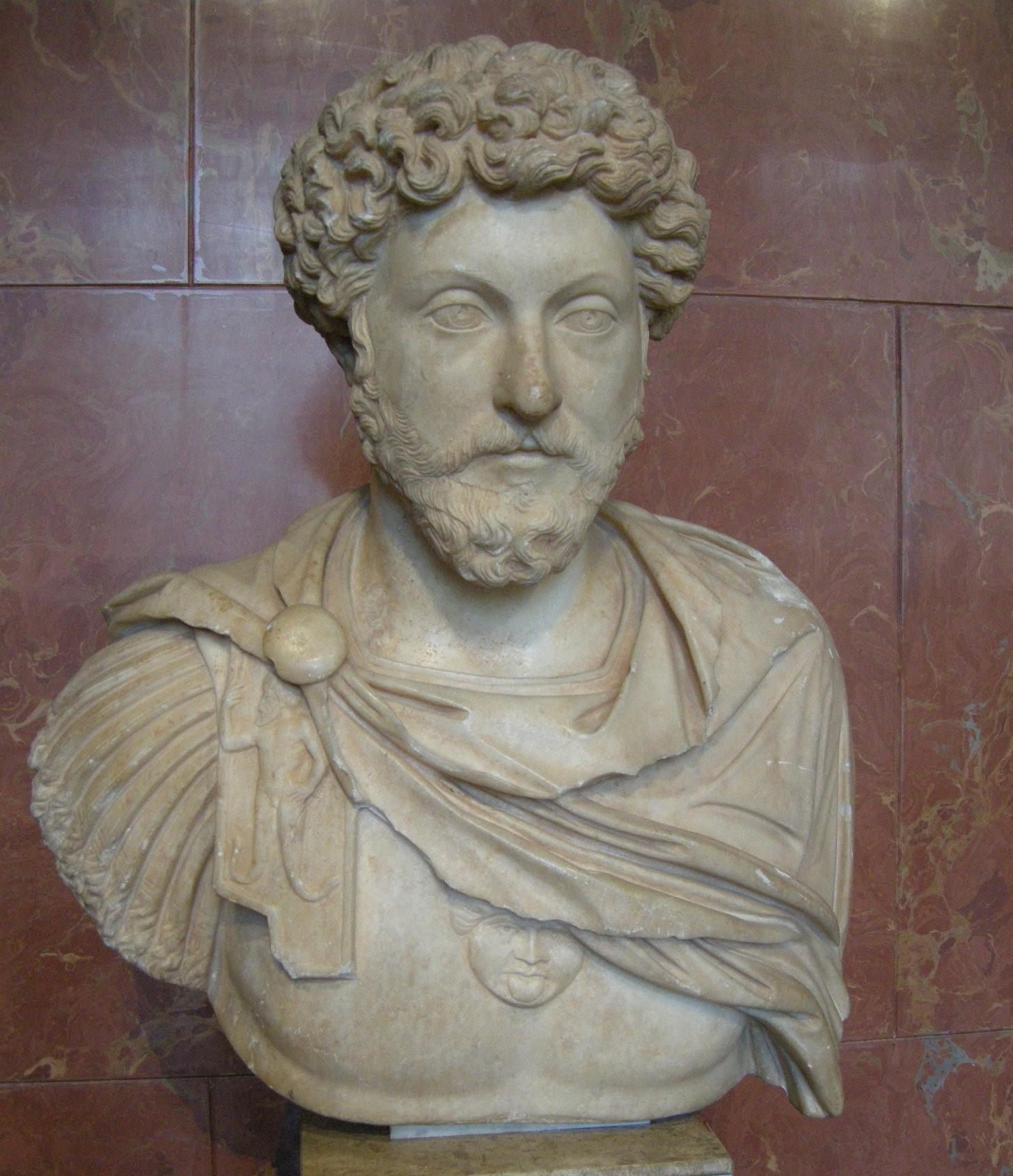
Bust of Marcus Aurelius from Probalinthos, Attica, Greece, c. 161 AD, now in the Louvre, Paris

Soon after the emperors' accession, Marcus' eleven-year-old daughter, Annia Lucilla, was betrothed to Verus (in spite of the fact that he was, formally, her uncle). At the ceremonies commemorating the event, new provisions were made for the support of poor children, along the lines of earlier imperial foundations. Marcus and Lucius proved popular with the people of Rome, who strongly approved of their civiliter ("lacking pomp") behavior. The emperors permitted free speech, evinced by the fact that the comedy writer Marullus was able to criticize them without suffering retribution. At any other time, under any other emperor, he would have been executed. But it was a peaceful time, a forgiving time. And thus, as the biographer of the Historia Augusta wrote, "No one missed the lenient ways of Pius."

Marcus replaced a number of the empire's major officials. The ab epistulis Sextus Caecilius Crescens Volusianus, in charge of the imperial correspondence, was replaced with Titus Varius Clemens. Clemens was from the frontier province of Pannonia and had served in the war in Mauretania. Recently, he had served as procurator of five provinces. He was a man suited for a time of military crisis. Marcus' former tutor Lucius Volusius Maecianus, who had been prefectural governor of Egypt at Marcus' accession, was recalled, made senator, and appointed prefect of the treasury (aerarium Saturni). He was made consul soon after. Fronto's son-in-law, Aufidius Victorinus, was appointed governor of Upper Germany.

Fronto returned to his Roman townhouse at dawn on 28 March, having left his home in Cirta as soon as news of his pupils' accession reached him. He sent a note to the imperial freedman Charilas, asking if he could call on the emperors. Fronto would later explain that he had not dared to write the emperors directly. The tutor was immensely proud of his students. Reflecting on the speech he had written on taking his consulship in 143, when he had praised the young Marcus, Fronto was ebullient: "There was then an outstanding natural ability in you; there is now perfected excellence. There was then a crop of growing corn; there is now a ripe, gathered harvest. What I was hoping for then, I have now. The hope has become a reality." Fronto called on Marcus alone; neither thought to invite Lucius.

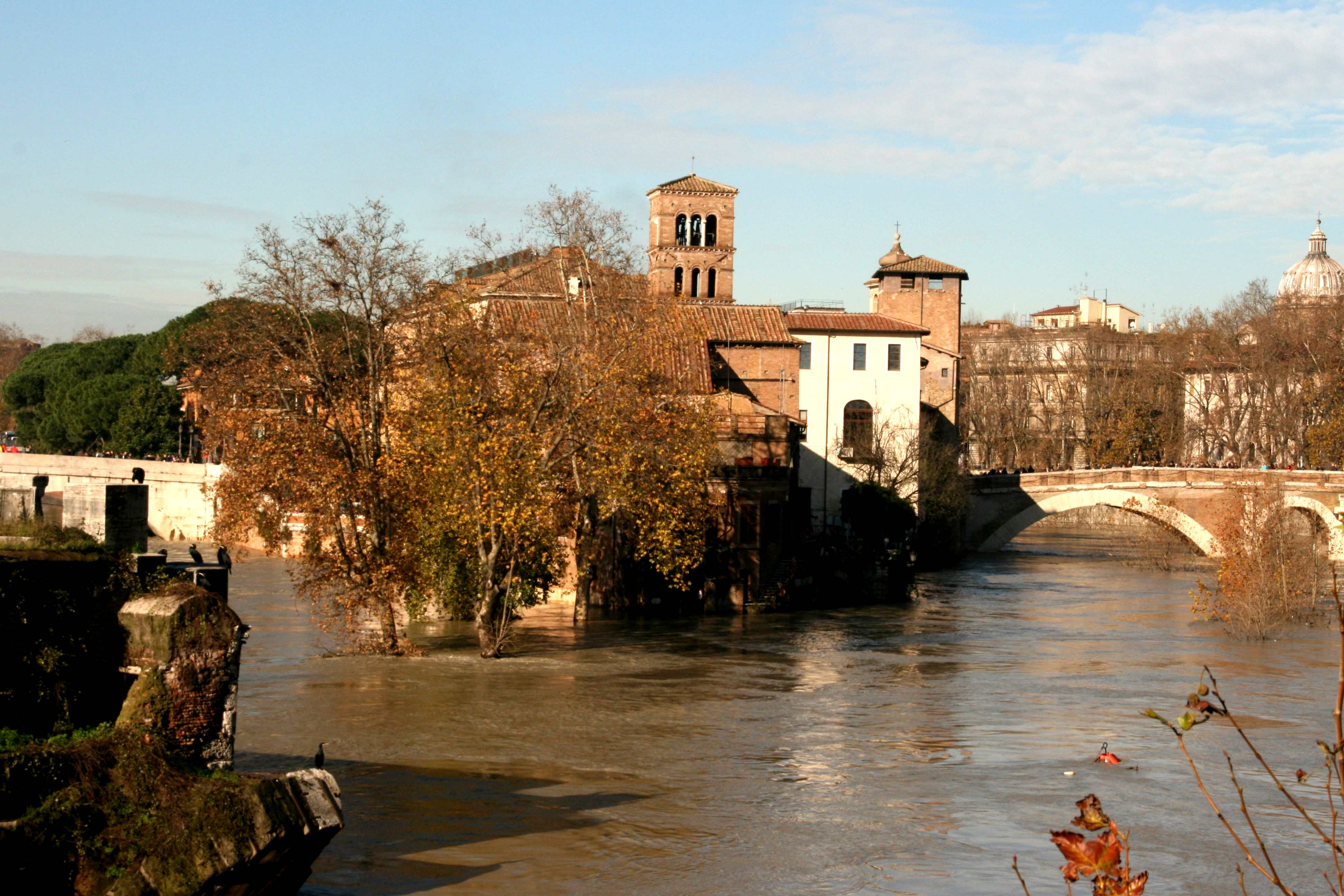
Tiber Island seen at a forty-year high-water mark of the Tiber, 13 December 2008

Lucius was less esteemed by Fronto than his brother, as his interests were on a lower level. Lucius asked Fronto to adjudicate in a dispute he and his friend Calpurnius were having on the relative merits of two actors. Marcus told Fronto of his reading—Coelius and a little Cicero—and his family. His daughters were in Rome with their great-great-aunt Matidia; Marcus thought the evening air of the country was too cold for them. He asked Fronto for "some particularly eloquent reading matter, something of your own, or Cato, or Cicero, or Sallust or Gracchus—or some poet, for I need distraction, especially in this kind of way, by reading something that will uplift and diffuse my pressing anxieties." Marcus Aurelius' early reign proceeded smoothly. He was able to give himself wholly to philosophy and the pursuit of popular affection. Soon, however, he would find he had many anxieties. It would mean the end of the felicitas temporum ("happy times") that the coinage of 161 had proclaimed. In the spring of 162, (Note: Both emperors are said to have taken active part in the recovery (HA Marcus viii.4–5), so the flood must have happened before Verus' departure for the east in 162; because it appears in the biographer of the Historia Augusta's narrative after Pius' funeral has finished and the emperors have settled into their offices, it must not have occurred in spring 161. The date of the flood was probably in autumn 161 or spring 162, and given the normal seasonal distribution of Tiber flooding, most likely in the latter. (Birley dates the flood to autumn 161.)) the Tiber flooded over its banks, destroying much of Rome. It drowned many animals, leaving the city in famine. Marcus and Lucius gave the crisis their personal attention. (Note: Since 15 CE, the river had been administered by a Tiber Conservancy Board, with a consular senator at its head and a permanent staff. In 161, the curator alevi Tiberis et riparum et cloacarum urbis ("Curator of the Tiber Bed and Banks and the City Sewers") was A. Platorius Nepos, son or grandson of the builder of Hadrian's Wall, whose name he shares. He probably had not been particularly incompetent. A more likely candidate for that incompetence is Nepos' likely predecessor, M. Statius Priscus. A military man and consul for 159, Priscus probably looked on the office as little more than "paid leave".) In other times of famine, they are said to have provided for the Italian communities out of the Roman granaries.

Fronto's letters continued through Marcus' early reign. Fronto felt that, because of Marcus' prominence and public duties, lessons were more important now than they had ever been before. He believed Marcus was "beginning to feel the wish to be eloquent once more, in spite of having for a time lost interest in eloquence". Fronto would again remind his pupil of the tension between his role and his philosophic pretensions: "Suppose, Caesar, that you can attain to the wisdom of Cleanthes and Zeno, yet, against your will, not the philosopher's woolen cape." The early days of Marcus' reign were the happiest of Fronto's life: Marcus was beloved by the people of Rome, an excellent emperor, a fond pupil, and, perhaps most importantly, as eloquent as could be wished. Marcus had displayed rhetorical skill in his speech to the senate after an earthquake at Cyzicus. It had conveyed the drama of the disaster, and the senate had been awed: "not more suddenly or violently was the city stirred by the earthquake than the minds of your hearers by your speech". Fronto was hugely pleased.

== War with Parthia, 161–166 ==
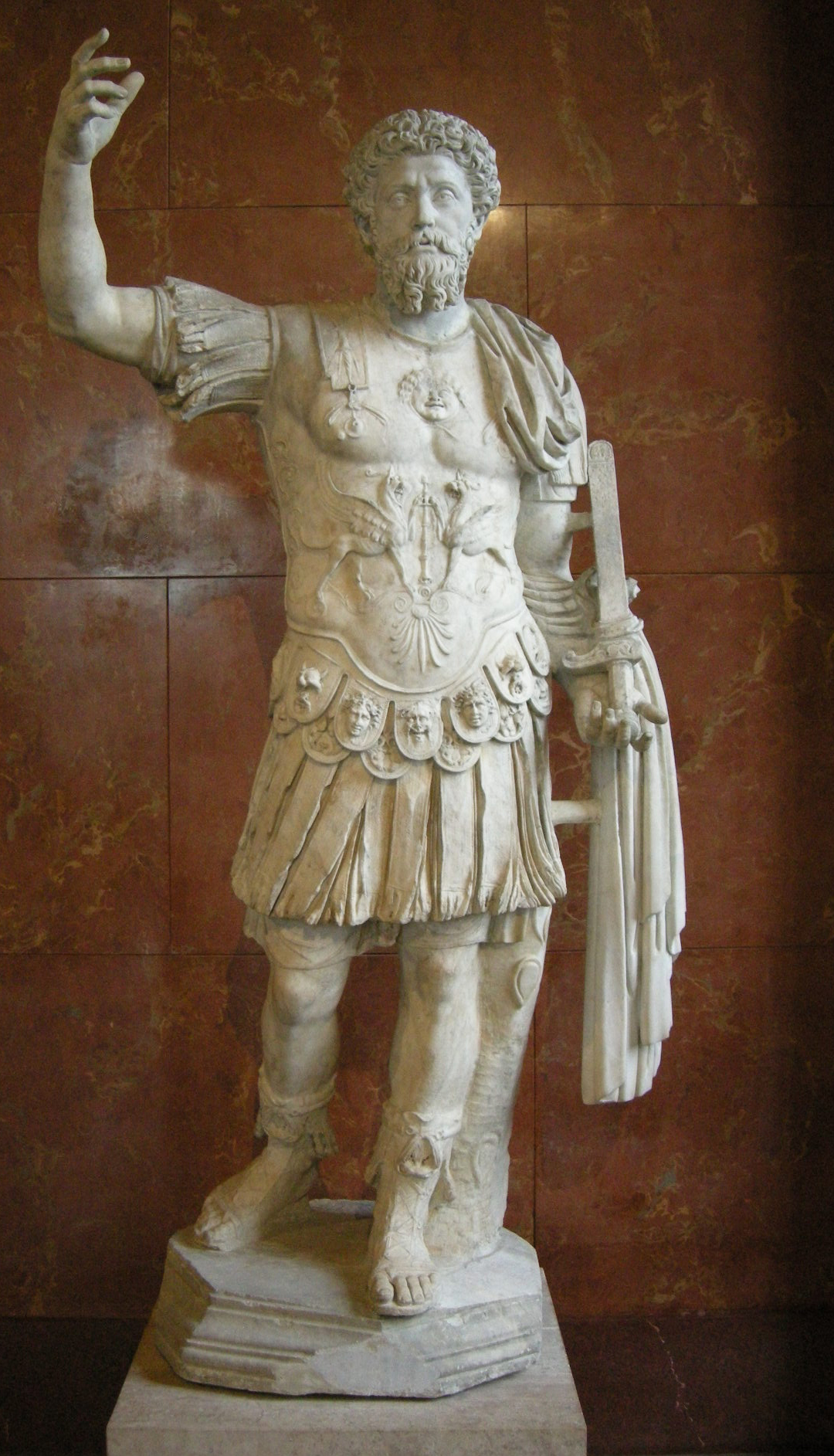
Statue of Marcus Aurelius from Gabii (Italy), late 2nd-century AD, now in the Louvre, Paris

In 161, Vologases IV of Parthia invaded the Kingdom of Armenia (then a Roman client state), expelled its king, and installed Pacorus, an Arsacid like himself. The governor of Cappadocia, Marcus Sedatius Severianus, a Gaul with much experience in military matters was convinced by the prophet Alexander of Abonutichus that he could defeat the Parthians easily, and win glory for himself. Severianus led his forces (perhaps the Ninth Legion of Hispania) into Armenia, but was trapped by the great Parthian general Chosrhoes at Elegeia, a town just beyond the Cappadocian frontiers, high up past the headwaters of the Euphrates. After attempting to fight Chosrhoes, Severianus committed suicide, and his legion was massacred. The campaign had lasted only three days.

There were also threats of war in Britain, and in Raetia and Upper Germany, where the Chatti of the Taunus mountains had recently crossed into Roman territory. Apparently having been given no military education by Pius, Marcus was unprepared. He had spent no part of his predecessor's twenty-three-year reign in the provinces, where most previous emperors had spent their early careers. (Note: Alan Cameron adduces the fifth-century writer Sidonius Apollinaris's comment that Aurelius commanded "countless legions" vivente Pio (while Pius was alive) while contesting Birley's contention that Aurelius had no military experience. (Neither Sidonius nor the Historia Augusta (Birley's source) are particularly reliable on second-century history.))

With news of Severianus' defeat, reinforcements were dispatched for the Parthian frontier. P. Julius Geminius Marcianus, an African senator commanding the Tenth Legion (Gemina) at Vindobona (Vienna), left for Cappadocia with detachments from the Danubian legions. Other forces were also sent east: the First Legion (Minervia) from Bonn in Upper Germany, the Second Legion (Adiutrix) from Aquincum, and the Fifth Legion (Macedonica) from Troesmis. The northern frontier was strategically weakened and its governors were told to avoid conflict wherever possible. M. Annius Libo, Marcus' young first cousin, was made the new governor of Syria. His first consulship had been in 161, and he lacked military experience.

Surviving letters from Marcus to Fronto describe a holiday the emperor took in Etruria, at the coastal resort town of Alsium, during which he was too anxious to relax. Fronto encouraged Marcus Aurelius to rest, calling on the example of his predecessors (Pius had enjoyed exercise in the palaestra, fishing, and comedy), He went so far as to write a fable about the gods' division of the day between morning and evening, to help Marcus break his habit of spending his evenings working on judicial matters instead of relaxing. Marcus, unable to take his former tutor's advise, wrote back: "I have duties hanging over me that can hardly be begged off".

Fronto sent Marcus a selection of reading material, and, to settle his unease over the course of the war, a long and considered letter, full of historical references. In modern editions of Fronto's works, it is labeled De bello Parthico (On the Parthian War). There had been reverses in Rome's past, Fronto writes, but, in the end, Romans had always prevailed over their enemies: "always and everywhere [Mars] has changed our troubles into successes and our terrors into triumphs".

=== Lucius at Antioch, 162–165 ===
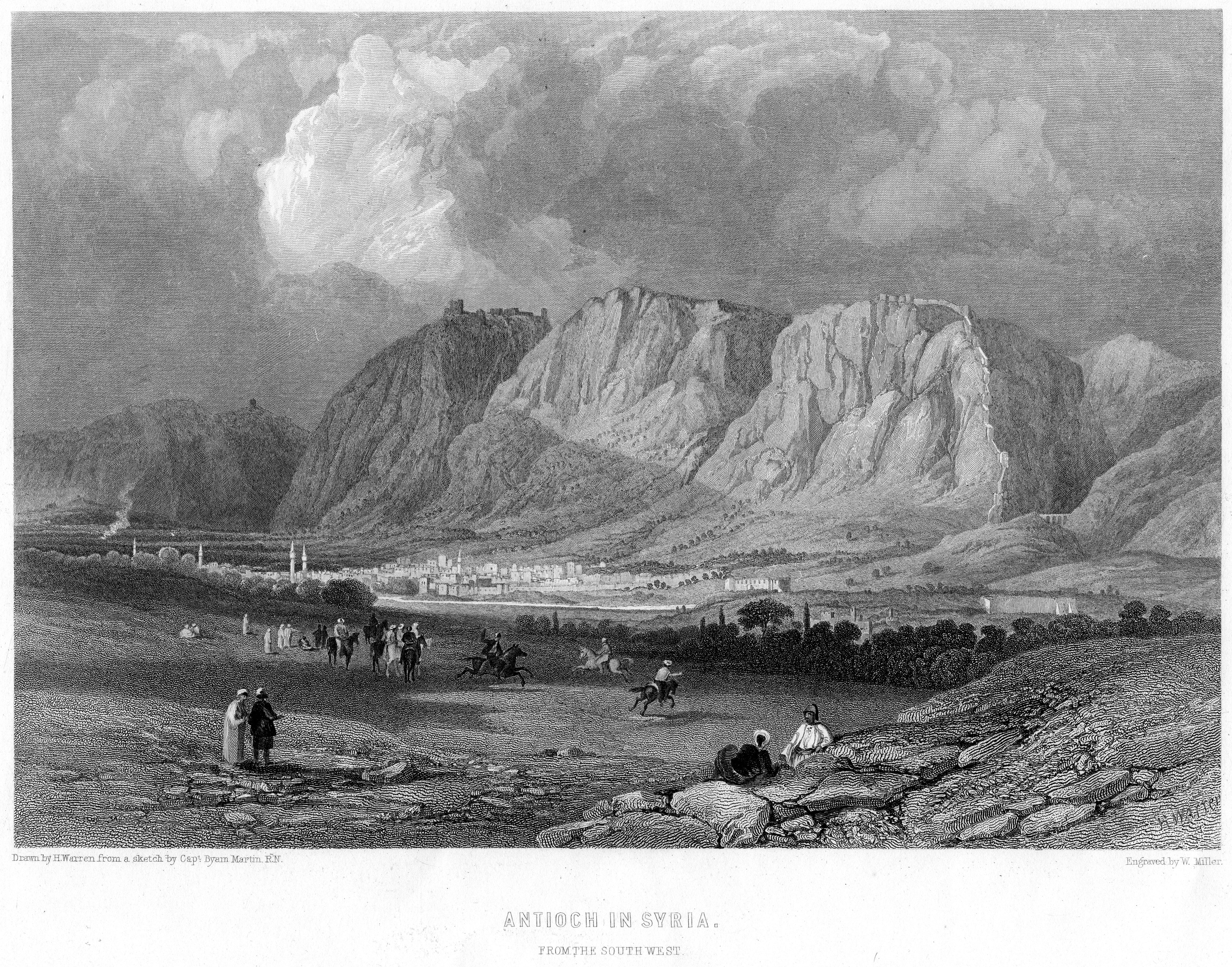
Engraving of Antioch by William Miller after H. Warren from a sketch by Captain Byam Martin, R.N., 1866. The dissolute Syrian army was said to spend more time in the city's open-air cafés than with their units.

Over the winter of 161–162, as more bad news arrived—a rebellion was brewing in Syria—it was decided that Lucius should direct the Parthian war in person. It has been suggested that he was stronger and healthier than Marcus, and more suited to military activity. Verus' biographer suggests ulterior motives, such as restraining his debaucheries, making him more thrifty, reforming his morals through the terrors of war, and helping him realize his role as emperor. (Note: Birley believes there is some truth in these considerations.) Whatever the case, the senate gave its assent, and, in the summer of 162, Lucius left. Marcus would remain in Rome; the city "demanded the presence of an emperor".

Lucius spent most of the campaign in Antioch, though he wintered at Laodicea and summered at Daphne, a resort just outside Antioch. Critics declaimed Lucius' luxurious lifestyle. He had taken to gambling, they said; he would "dice the whole night through". He enjoyed the company of actors. (Note: The whole section of the vita dealing with Lucius' debaucheries (HA Verus 4.4–6.6), however, is an insertion into a narrative otherwise entirely cribbed from an earlier source. Most of the details are fabricated by the biographer of the Historia Augusta himself, relying on nothing better than his own imagination.) Libo died early in the war; perhaps Verus had murdered him.

In the middle of the war, perhaps in autumn 163 or early 164, Verus made a trip to Ephesus to be married to Marcus' daughter Lucilla. Marcus moved up the date; perhaps he was disturbed by stories of Verus' mistress, the low-born and beautiful Panthea. Lucilla's thirteenth birthday was in March 163; whatever the date of her marriage, she was not yet fifteen. Lucilla was accompanied by her mother Faustina and M. Vettulenus Civica Barbarus, the half-brother of Lucius' father. Civica was made comes Augusti, "companion of the emperors"; perhaps Marcus wanted him to watch over Lucius, the job Libo had failed at. Marcus may have planned to accompany them all the way to Smyrna (the biographer of the Historia Augusta says he told the senate he would); this did not happen. He only accompanied the group as far as Brundisium, where they boarded a ship for the east. Marcus returned to Rome immediately thereafter, and sent out special instructions to his proconsuls not to give the group any official reception.

=== Counterattack and victory, 163–166 ===
The Armenian capital Artaxata was captured in 163. At the end of the year, Verus took the title Armeniacus, despite having never seen combat; Marcus declined to accept the title until the following year. When Verus was hailed as imperator again, however, Marcus did not hesitate to take the Imperator II with him.

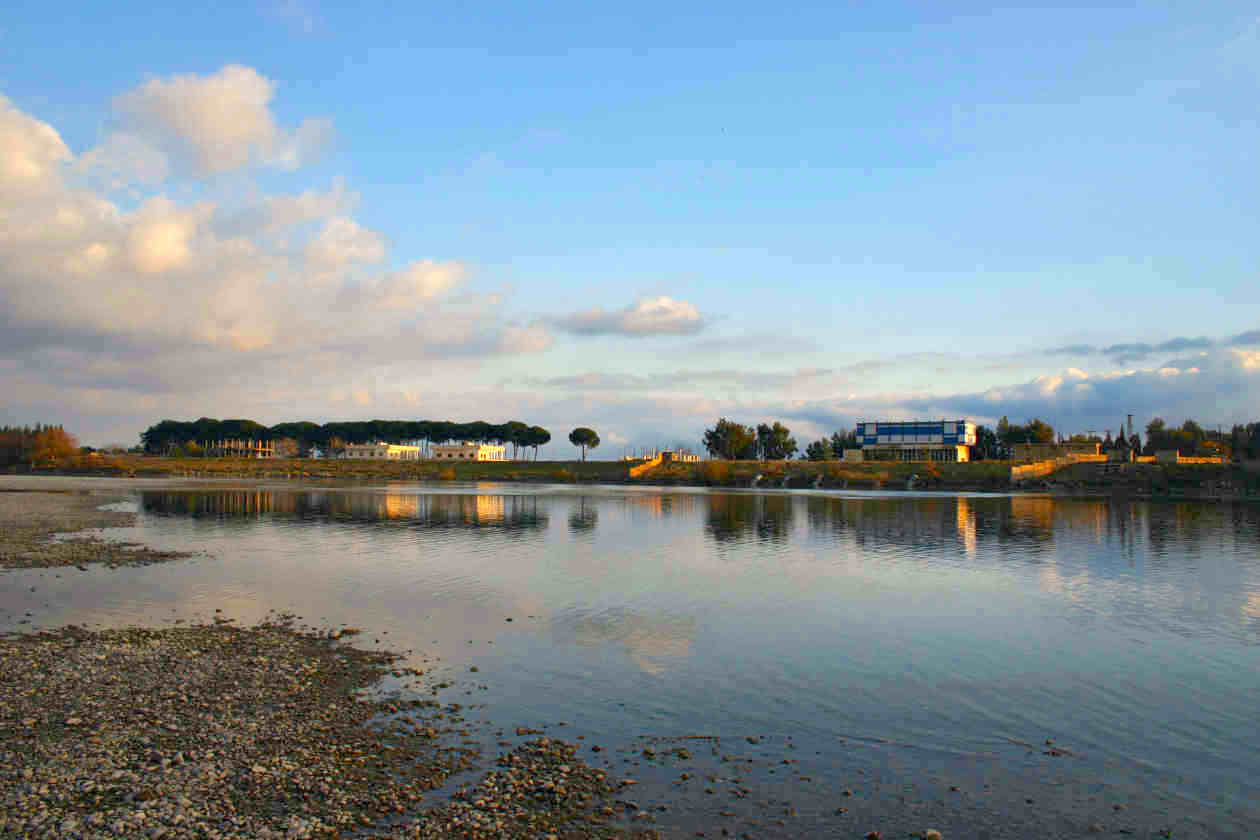
The Euphrates river near Raqqa, Syria

Occupied Armenia was reconstructed on Roman terms. In 164, a new capital, Kaine Polis ('New City'), replaced Artaxata. A new king was installed: a Roman senator of consular rank and Arsacid descent, C. Iulius Sohaemus. He may not even have been crowned in Armenia; the ceremony may have taken place in Antioch, or even Ephesus. Sohaemus was hailed on the imperial coinage of 164 under the legend Rex armeniis Datus: Lucius sat on a throne with his staff while Sohamenus stood before him, saluting the emperor.

In 163, the Parthians intervened in Osroene, a Roman client in upper Mesopotamia centered on Edessa, and installed their own king on its throne. In response, Roman forces were moved downstream, to cross the Euphrates at a more southerly point. Before the end of 163, however, Roman forces had moved north to occupy Dausara and Nicephorium on the northern, Parthian bank. Soon after the conquest of the north bank of the Euphrates, other Roman forces moved on Osroene from Armenia, taking Anthemusia, a town south-west of Edessa.

In 165, Roman forces moved on Mesopotamia. Edessa was re-occupied, and Mannus, the king deposed by the Parthians, was re-installed. The Parthians retreated to Nisibis, but this too was besieged and captured. The Parthian army dispersed in the Tigris. A second force, under Avidius Cassius and the III Gallica, moved down the Euphrates, and fought a major battle at Dura. By the end of the year, Cassius' army had reached the twin metropolises of Mesopotamia: Seleucia on the right bank of the Tigris and Ctesiphon on the left. Ctesiphon was taken and its royal palace set to flame. The citizens of Seleucia, still largely Greek (the city had been commissioned and settled as a capital of the Seleucid Empire, one of Alexander the Great's successor kingdoms), opened its gates to the invaders. The city got sacked nonetheless, leaving a black mark on Lucius' reputation. Excuses were sought, or invented: the official version had it that the Seleucids broke faith first.

Cassius' army, although suffering from a shortage of supplies and the effects of a plague contracted in Seleucia, made it back to Roman territory safely. Verus took the title Parthicus Maximus, and he and Marcus were hailed as imperatores again, earning the title 'imp. III'. Cassius' army returned to the field in 166, crossing over the Tigris into Media. Verus took the title 'Medicus', and the emperors were again hailed as imperatores, becoming 'imp. IV' in imperial titulature. Marcus Aurelius took the Parthicus Maximus now, after another tactful delay.

=== Conclusion of the war and events at Rome, mid-160s–167 ===
Bas-relief scenes depicting events of the Marcomannic Wars, from the (now destroyed) Arch of Marcus Aurelius in Rome, 176–180 AD, Capitoline Museums

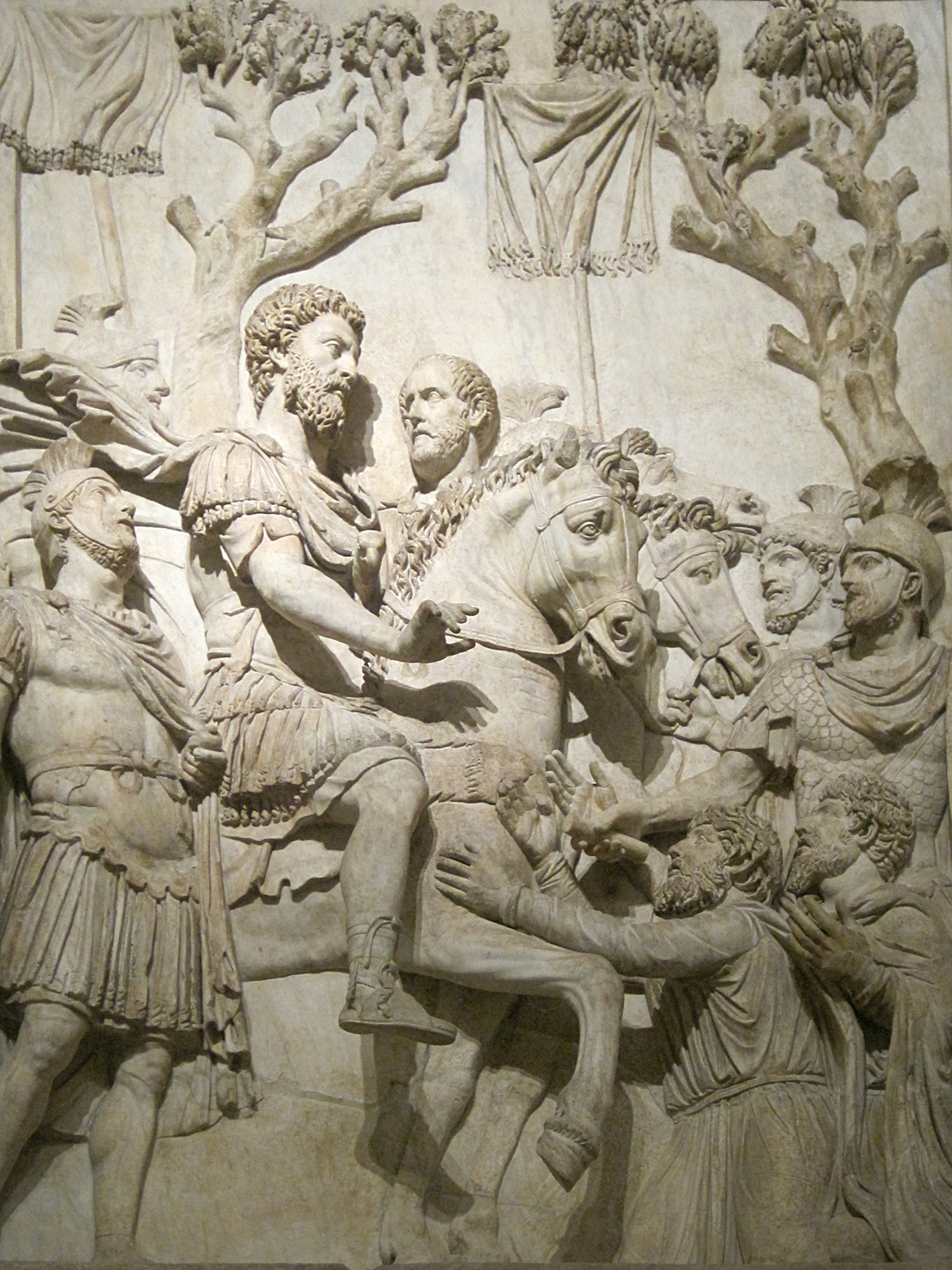
Marcus Aurelius receiving the submission of the vanquished, with raised vexillum standards

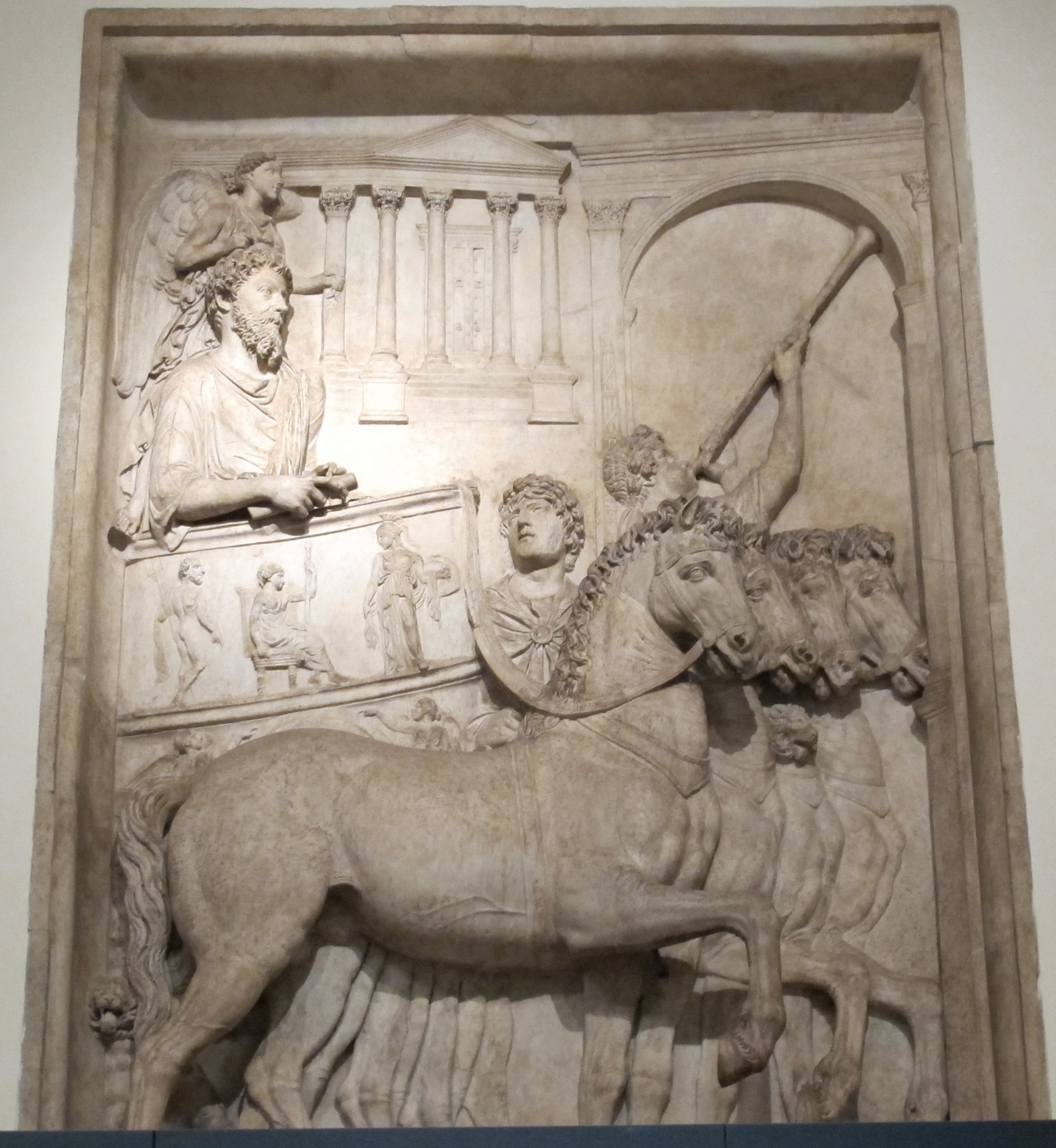
Marcus Aurelius celebrating his triumph over Rome's enemies in 176 AD, riding in a quadriga chariot

Most of the credit for the war's success must be ascribed to subordinate generals, the most prominent of which was C. Avidius Cassius, commander of III Gallica, one of the Syrian legions. Cassius was young senator of low birth from the north Syrian town of Cyrrhus. His father, Heliodorus, had not been a senator, but was nonetheless a man of some standing: he had been Hadrian's ab epistulis, followed the emperor on his travels, and was prefect of Egypt at the end of Hadrian's reign. Cassius also, with no small sense of self-worth, claimed descent from the Seleucid kings. Cassius and his fellow commander in the war, Martius Verus, still probably in their mid-thirties, took the consulships for 166. After their consulships, they were made governors: Cassius, of Syria; Martius Verus, of Cappadocia.

At Rome, Marcus Aurelius was occupied with family matters. Matidia, his great-aunt, had died. Her will was invalid under the lex Falcidia: Matidia had assigned more than three-quarters of her estate to non-relatives; her clients had convinced her to include them in codicils to her will. Matidia had never confirmed the documents, but, as she lay unconscious, her clients had sealed them in with the original, making them valid. It was an embarrassing situation. Fronto urged Marcus to push the family's case; Marcus demurred. He was going to consult his brother, who would make the final call. (Note: Champlin dates these letters to either summer 162 or early 165.)

The returning army carried with them a plague, afterwards known as the Antonine Plague, or the Plague of Galen, which spread through the Roman Empire between 165 and 180. The disease was a pandemic believed to have been either smallpox or measles but the true cause remains undetermined. The epidemic may have claimed the life of Lucius Verus, who died in 169. The disease broke out again nine years later, according to the Roman historian Dio Cassius, causing up to 2,000 deaths a day in Rome, one quarter of those who were affected, giving the disease a mortality rate of about 25%. The total deaths have been estimated at five million, and the disease killed as much as one-third of the population in some areas and devastated the Roman army.

== Legal and administrative work, 161–180 ==
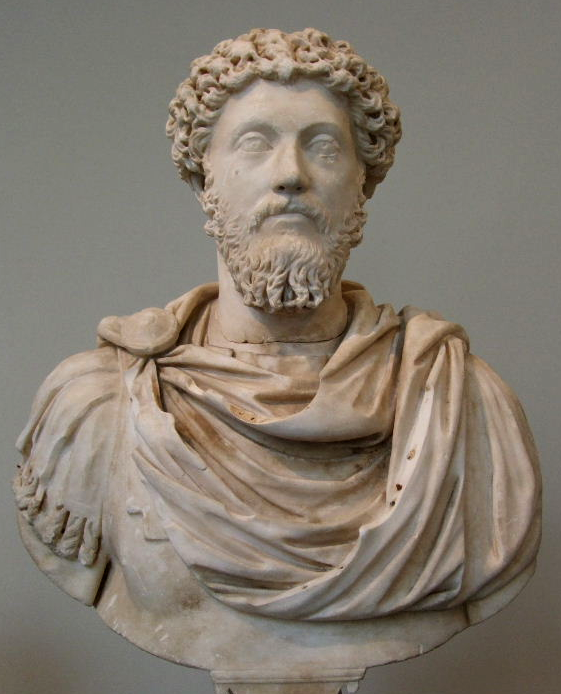
Bust of Marcus Aurelius, Metropolitan Museum of Art, New York

Like nearly all emperors, Marcus spent most of his time addressing petitions and hearing disputes—that is, on matters of law. He took great care in the theory and practice of legislation. Professional jurists called him "an emperor most skilled in the law" and "a most prudent and conscientiously just emperor". He showed marked interest in three areas of the law: the manumission of slaves, the guardianship of orphans and minors, and the choice of city councillors (decuriones).

A possible contact with Han China occurred in 166 when a Roman traveller visited the Han court, claiming to be an ambassador representing a certain Andun (Chinese: 安 敦), ruler of Daqin, who can be identified either with Marcus or his predecessor Pius. In addition to Republican-era Roman glasswares found at Guangzhou along the South China Sea, Roman golden medallions made during the reign of Pius and perhaps even Marcus have been found at Óc Eo, Vietnam, then part of the Kingdom of Funan near the Chinese province of Jiaozhi (in northern Vietnam). This may have been the port city of Kattigara, described by Ptolemy (c. 150) as being visited by a Greek sailor named Alexander and laying beyond the Golden Chersonese (i.e. Malay Peninsula). Roman coins from the reigns of Tiberius to Aurelian have been found in Xi'an, China (site of the Han capital Chang'an), although the far greater amount of Roman coins in India suggests the Roman maritime trade for purchasing Chinese silk was centered there, not in China or even the overland Silk Road running through Persia.

== Germania and the Danube ==
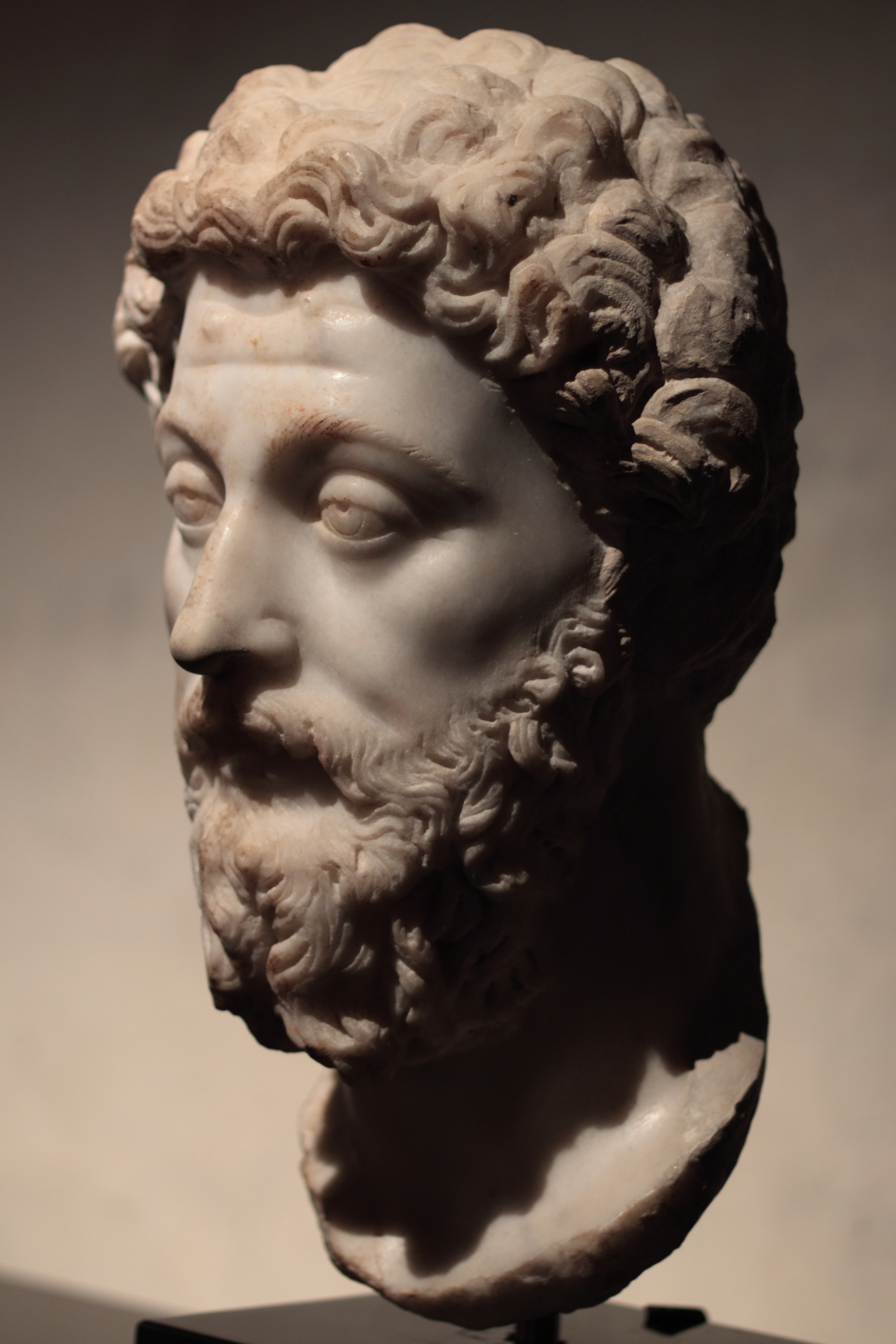
Bust of Marcus Aurelius in the Liebieghaus, Frankfurt

During the early 160s, Fronto's son-in-law Victorinus was stationed as a legate in Germany. He was there with his wife and children (one child had stayed with Fronto and his wife in Rome). The condition on the northern frontier looked grave. A frontier post had been destroyed, and it looked like all the peoples of central and northern Europe were in turmoil. There was corruption among the officers: Victorinus had to ask for the resignation of a legionary legate who was taking bribes. Experienced governors had been replaced by friends and relatives of the imperial family. Lucius Dasumius Tullius Tuscus, a distant relative of Hadrian, was in Upper Pannonia, succeeding the experienced Marcus Nonius Macrinus. Lower Pannonia was under the obscure Tiberius Haterius Saturnius. Marcus Servilius Fabianus Maximus was shuffled from Lower Moesia to Upper Moesia when Marcus Iallius Bassus had joined Lucius in Antioch. Lower Moesia was filled by Pontius Laelianus' son. The Dacias were still divided in three, governed by a praetorian senator and two procurators. The peace could not hold long; Lower Pannonia did not even have a legion.

Starting in the 160s, Germanic tribes and other nomadic people launched raids along the northern border, particularly into Gaul and across the Danube. This new impetus westwards was probably due to attacks from tribes further east. A first invasion of the Chatti in the province of Germania Superior was repulsed in 162. Far more dangerous was the invasion of 166, when the Marcomanni of Bohemia, clients of the Roman Empire since year 19, crossed the Danube together with the Lombards and other Germanic tribes. Soon thereafter, the Iranian Sarmatians attacked between the Danube and the Theiss rivers.

The Costoboci, coming from the Carpathian area, invaded Moesia, Macedonia and Greece. After a long struggle, Marcus Aurelius managed to push back the invaders. Numerous members of Germanic tribes settled in frontier regions like Dacia, Pannonia, Germany and Italy itself. This was not a new thing, but this time the numbers of settlers required the creation of two new frontier provinces on the left shore of the Danube, Sarmatia and Marcomannia, including today's Czech Republic, Slovakia and Hungary. Some Germanic tribes who settled in Ravenna revolted and managed to seize possession of the city. For this reason, Marcus Aurelius decided not only against bringing more barbarians into Italy, but even banished those who had previously been brought there.

== Death and succession ==
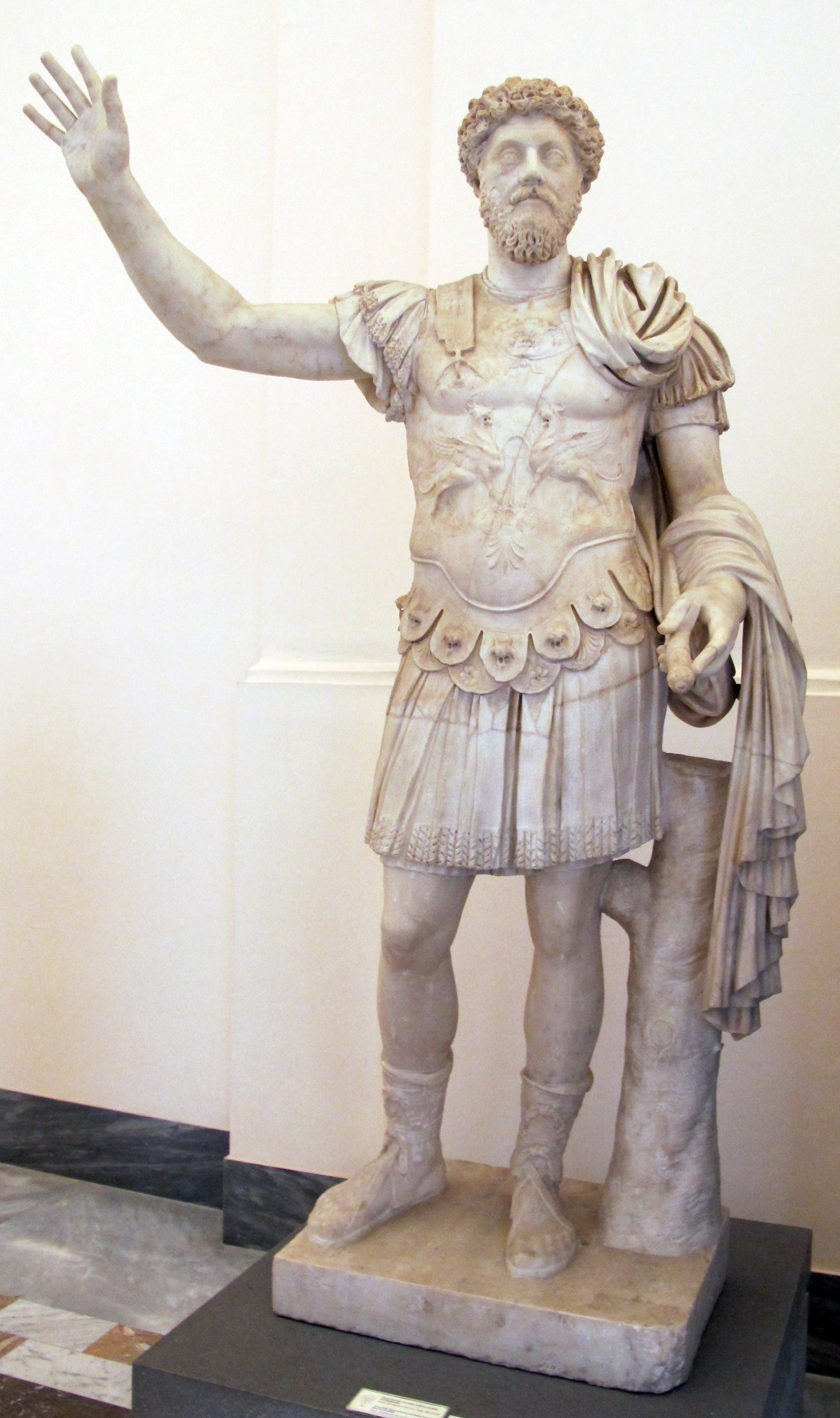
Head of Marcus Aurelius on a marble body originally made c. 41-54 AD during the reign of Claudius, Farnese Collection, Naples

Marcus Aurelius died on 17 March 180, in the city of Vindobona (modern Vienna), his son and successor Commodus accompanying him. He was immediately deified and his ashes were returned to Rome, and rested in Hadrian's mausoleum (modern Castel Sant'Angelo) until the Visigoth sack of the city in 410. His campaigns against Germans and Sarmatians were also commemorated by a column and a temple built in Rome.

Marcus Aurelius was able to secure the succession for Commodus, whom he had named Caesar in 166 and made co-emperor in 177, though the choice may have been unknowingly unfortunate; this decision, which put an end to the fortunate series of "adoptive emperors", was highly criticized by later historians since Commodus was a political and military outsider, as well as an extreme egotist with neurotic problems. For this reason, Marcus Aurelius' death is often held to have been the end of the Pax Romana.

At the end of his history of Marcus Aurelius' reign, Cassius Dio wrote an encomium to the emperor, and described the transition to Commodus, to Dio's own times, with sorrow.

[Marcus] did not meet with the good fortune that he deserved, for he was not strong in body and was involved in a multitude of troubles throughout practically his entire reign. But for my part, I admire him all the more for this very reason, that amid unusual and extraordinary difficulties he both survived himself and preserved the empire. Just one thing prevented him from being completely happy, namely, that after rearing and educating his person in the best possible way he was vastly disappointed in him. This matter must be our next topic; for our history now descends from a kingdom of gold to one of iron and rust, as affairs did for the Romans of that day.

– Cassius Dio lxxi.36.3–4

It is possible that Marcus Aurelius chose Commodus simply in the absence of other candidates, or as a result of the fear of succession issues and the possibility of civil war. Michael Grant, in The Climax of Rome (1968), writes of Commodus: "The youth turned out to be very erratic or at least so anti-traditional that disaster was inevitable. But whether or not Marcus Aurelius ought to have known this to be so, the rejections of his son's claims in favour of someone else would almost certainly involved one of the civil wars which were to proliferate so disastrous around future successions."

== Writings ==
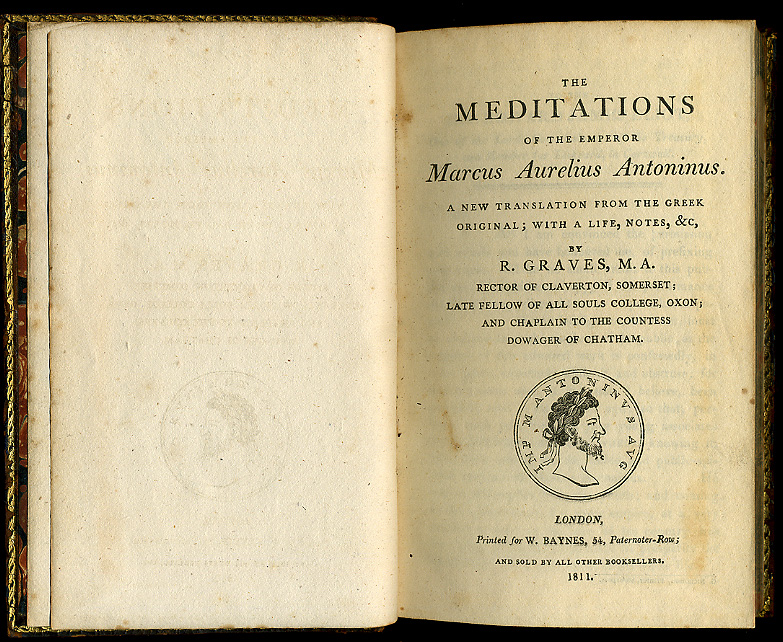
First page of the 1792 English translation by Richard Graves

While on campaign between 170 and 180, Marcus Aurelius wrote his Meditations in Greek as a source for his own guidance and self-improvement. The original title of this work, if it had one, is unknown. "Meditations" as well as others, including "To Himself" were adopted later. He had a logical mind and his notes were representative of Stoic philosophy and spirituality. Meditations is still revered as a literary monument to a government of service and duty. The book was a favourite of Christina of Sweden, Frederick the Great, John Stuart Mill, Matthew Arnold, and Goethe. Modern figures such as Wen Jiabao and Bill Clinton are admirers of the book.

It is not known how far Marcus Aurelius' writings were circulated after his death. There are stray references in the ancient literature to the popularity of his precepts, and Julian the Apostate was well aware of Marcus Aurelius' reputation as a philosopher, though he does not specifically mention the Meditations. It survived in the scholarly traditions of the Eastern Church and the first surviving quotes of the book, as well as the first known reference of it by name ("Marcus' writings to himself") are from Arethas of Caesarea in the 10th century and in the Byzantine Suda (perhaps inserted by Arethas himself). It was first published in 1558 in Zurich by Wilhelm Xylander (ne Holzmann), from a manuscript reportedly lost shortly afterwards. The oldest surviving complete manuscript copy is in the Vatican Library and dates to the 14th century.
