= Iamblichus (novelist) =

2nd century Syrian Greek novelist

Iamblichus (Ancient Greek: Ἰάμβλιχος; fl. c. 165–180 AD) was an ancient Syrian Greek novelist. He was the author of the Babyloniaca (Βαβυλωνιακά, Babylōniaká, 'Babylonian Stories'), a romance novel in Greek. If not the earliest, it was at least one of the first productions of this kind in Greek literature.

== Life ==
Iamblichus was an Emesene who achieved wide prominence in the 2nd century. He describes himself as being "descended from the ancient dynasts", i.e. the Sampsigeramids. Iamblichus had the knowledge of three languages: Assyrian, Babylonian and Greek.

Iamblichus was educated in Babylon, and didn't become acquainted with the Greek language until later in his life. After having lived at Babylon for a number of years, he was taken prisoner and sold as a slave to a Syrian, who, however, appears to have set him free again. He is said to have acquired such a perfect knowledge of Greek that he even distinguished himself as a rhetorician. For a time, he lived in Armenia, when it was ruled by the Roman client king; his fellow Emesene and distant relative Sohaemus.

== The Babyloniaca ==
Iamblichus's novel was about two lovers, Rhodanes and Sinonis. Garmus, a legendary king of Babylon, forces Sinonis to marry him and throws Rhodanes into prison. The lovers manage to escape, and after many singular adventures, in which magic plays a considerable part, Garmus is overthrown by Rhodanes, who becomes king of Babylon.

According to the Suda, it consisted of 39 books, but Photios, who gives a tolerably full epitome of the work, mentions only 16. A perfect copy of the work in manuscript existed down to the year 1671, when it was destroyed by fire. A few fragments of the original work have been preserved. The epitome of Photios and the fragments are collected in Chardon de la Rochette's Melanges de Critique et de Philologie, Vol. 1, pp. 18, 34 and 53, and in Franz Passow's Corpus Erotic., vol. i.; comp. Fabric. Bibl. Graec. vol. viii. p. 152; Gerardus Vossius, De Hist. Graec. p. 275, ed. Westermann.

== Sources ==
- A.R. Birley, Septimius Severus: the African emperor, Routledge, 1999
- T. Whitmarsh, The Cambridge companion to the Greek and Roman novel, Cambridge University Press, 2008
