= Sohaemus of Armenia =

King of Armenia (144–161, 163–180)

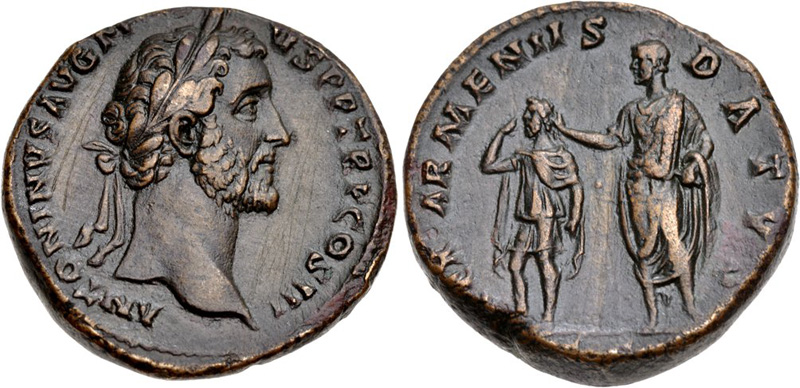
- Coin of Antoninus Pius, struck at the Rome mint, dated ca. 141-143. On the reverse, a standing Pius is depicted, holding roll and placing hand on head of Roman-appointed king of Armenia Sohaemus, who raises hand to adjust tiara.

King of Armenia
- 1st Reign: 144–161
- Predecessor: Vologases I
- Successor: Pacorus
- 2nd Reign: 163–180
- Predecessor: Pacorus
- Successor: Vologases II
- Died: 180

Gaius Julius Sohaemus (Ancient Greek: Γάϊος Ἰούλιος Σόαιμος; died 180) was a Roman client king of Armenia.

== Life ==
Sohaemus, a prominent person in the Roman Empire in the 2nd century, was from the Orontid dynasty of Commagene and the Emesene dynasty from Syria. His contemporary, the novelist Iamblichus claims Sohaemus as his fellow-countryman. Iamblichus calls Sohaemus an Arsacid and Achaemenid in his lineage. He was a descendant of the Median Princess Iotapa, who was once betrothed to the Ptolemaic Prince Alexander Helios. Little is known about Sohaemus’ family and early life prior to becoming King of Armenia. Before becoming king, Sohaemus had been a Roman senator and served as a Consul in Rome at an unknown date.

== First period of Rule ==
In 144, Sohaemus received the Armenian throne from the Roman emperor Antoninus Pius after the death of Vologases I. In honor of his first ascent to the throne of Armenia, a sestertius with images of Sohaemus and Antoninus Pius was issued in Rome with the inscription "A king given to the Armenians". Sohaemus was a contemporary to the rule of the Roman emperors Antoninus Pius, Marcus Aurelius, Lucius Verus and Commodus of the Nerva–Antonine dynasty. In his first reign, he ruled from 144 to 161. Not much is known about his first reign. The novelist Iamblichus living in Armenia at the time of his rule describes his reign as ‘in succession to his ancestors’. This statement can also refer to his former ancestor Sohaemus of Emesa who lived in the 1st century.

In 161 Vologases IV of Parthia, son of the legitimate King Mithridates V of Parthia, dispatched his troops to seize Armenia and eradicated the Roman legions stationed in the country under the legate Marcus Sedatius Severianus. Vologases then installed Pacorus as King of Armenia. Encouraged by the spahbod Osroes, Parthian troops marched further west into Roman Syria. After Armenia was seized by the Parthians, Sohaemus went into political exile, living in Rome where he became a senator.

These events provoked a new Roman-Parthian war and peace was made on Roman terms, with Sohaemus reinstalled as King of Armenia by Lucius Verus in either 163 or 164. The ceremony for Sohaemus becoming King of Armenia for the second time may have taken place in Antioch or Ephesus. This war cost Rome dearly, because the victorious army brought back with it from the east a plague that spread very quickly throughout the empire. Emperor Marcus Aurelius tried to declare Armenia a province of Rome, but the uprising of Armenians led by Prince Tiridates forced the Romans to abandon their plans. In 164, Latin coinage was struck in Armenia with the inscription L. Verus. Aug. Armeniacus and on the reverse Rex Armen(ii)s datus.

== Second period of Rule ==
The time of his second reign is unknown. Sohaemus reigned from 163 perhaps up to 186. Under Sohaemus, construction work continued in the capital Vagharshapat. A citadel, defensive fortifications, a palace complex, and several pagan temples were built in the city. Sometime during his reign, Sohaemus was expelled by elements favorable to Parthia. A man called Tiridates, who had murdered the King of the Osroenes and had brandished his sword in the face of Publius Martius Verus, the governor of Cappadocia, when rebuked for it, stirred up trouble in Armenia. Tiridates' only punishment for his crimes was to be exiled to Roman Britain by Marcus Aurelius.

As a result of Sohaemus’ second expulsion from Armenia, Roman forces went to war with the Parthians, who retook most of their lost territory in 166, while Sohaemus fled to Syria. After Marcus Aurelius, Lucius Verus and the Parthian rulers intervened in the conflict, the son of Vologases IV of Parthia, Vologases II assumed the Armenian throne in 186.

== In culture ==
Sohemos patronized Hellenistic culture, and gave refuge to the poet and historian Iambelikos at his court, who is believed to have written the epic poem "The Babylonians" here.

Sohemos is featured in the 1964 Hollywood film "The Fall of the Roman Empire", where he was portrayed by the famous actor Omar Sharif.

== Sources ==
- Royal Ancient Egyptian Genealogy: Ptolemaic Dynasty
- A. R. Birley, Septimius Severus: The African Emperor, Routledge, 1999
- A. R. Birley, Marcus Aurelius, Routledge, 2000
- A. K. Bowman, P. Garnsey & D. Rathbone, The High Empire, A.D. 70-192, Cambridge University Press, 2000
- A. E. Redgate, The Armenians, Blackwell Publishing, 2000
- C. Settipani, Continuité gentilice et continuité familiale dans les familles sénatoriales romaines à l’époque imperial, Oxford, 2000
- Russell, James R. (1987). Zoroastrianism in Armenia. Harvard University Press. ISBN 978-0674968509.

== See also ==
- Arsacid dynasty of Armenia
- Garni Temple
- Lucius Verus
- Marcus Aurelius
- Royal family of Emesa
