= Sedatus =

Sedatus (Latin: SEDATVS) was a guardian deity (genius) of the Breuci and the Latobici. Originally Celtic, Sedatus is known to have been worshipped during the Roman Empire as late as the 2nd-century AD as indicated by a votive stone dedicated to this god by the First Cohort of the Breuci.

Sedatus may have been the namesake of the Sedatii, a Gallo-Roman family active in the mid 2nd-century AD.

== Inscriptions ==
- CIL III, 885
- CIL III, 2521
- CIL III, 2810

== Bibliography ==
- August Dimitz, History of Carniola: From Ancient times to the year 1813, vol. I p.15 and 55
