= Gaius Sedatius Florus =

2nd century Gallo-Roman lawyer and official

Gaius Sedatius Florus (Latin: C. Sedat. Florus; (Note: CIL XIII, 3106) fl. early 2nd-century AD) was a lawyer and secretary for the administration of Portus Namnetum (modern Nantes) with Marcus Gemellius Secundus sometime in the early second century. A member of the Sedatii family, Florus could have been a relative, albeit a poor relation, to the senator Marcus Sedatius Severianus; he might have even been a client of Severianus, or even an emancipated slave.

According to an inscription found in Nantes, Florus and Gemellius were prosecutors representing the people of the port and used their own money to establish a tribunal in the market place. The inscription is dated to the first half of the 2nd-century.
