= Marcus Sedatius Severianus =

Roman senator, consul and general (105–161/162)

Consul of the Roman Empire
- In office July – September 153 Serving with Publius Septimius Aper
- Preceded by: Sextus Caecilius Maximus with Marcus Pontius Sabibus
- Succeeded by: Gaius Cattius Marcellus with Quintus Petiedius Gallus

Personal details
- Born: c. 105 Lemonum, Gaul (modern-day Poitiers, France)
- Died: 161 Elegeia, Armenia (modern-day Erzurum, Turkey)
- Spouse: Julia Regina
- Children: Marcus Sedatius Severus
- Occupation: Politician, general

Military service
- Allegiance: Roman Empire
- Commands: Quaestor of Sicily; Governor of Dacia; Governor of Cappadocia
- Battles/wars: Roman–Parthian War of 161–166; Siege of Elegeia

Marcus Sedatius Severianus (105–161 or 162) was a Roman senator, suffect consul, and general during the 2nd century AD, originally from Gaul. Severianus was a provincial governor and later a provincial consul. The peak of his career was as suffect consul for the nundinium of July–September 153 as the colleague of Publius Septimius Aper. He was governor of Cappadocia at the start of the Roman war with Parthia, during which he was convinced by the untrustworthy oracle to invade Armenia in 161. Sedatius committed suicide while under siege in the Armenian city of Elegeia, on the upper Euphrates. The legion he led was wiped out shortly after. He was replaced as governor of Cappadocia by Marcus Statius Priscus.

== Origins ==
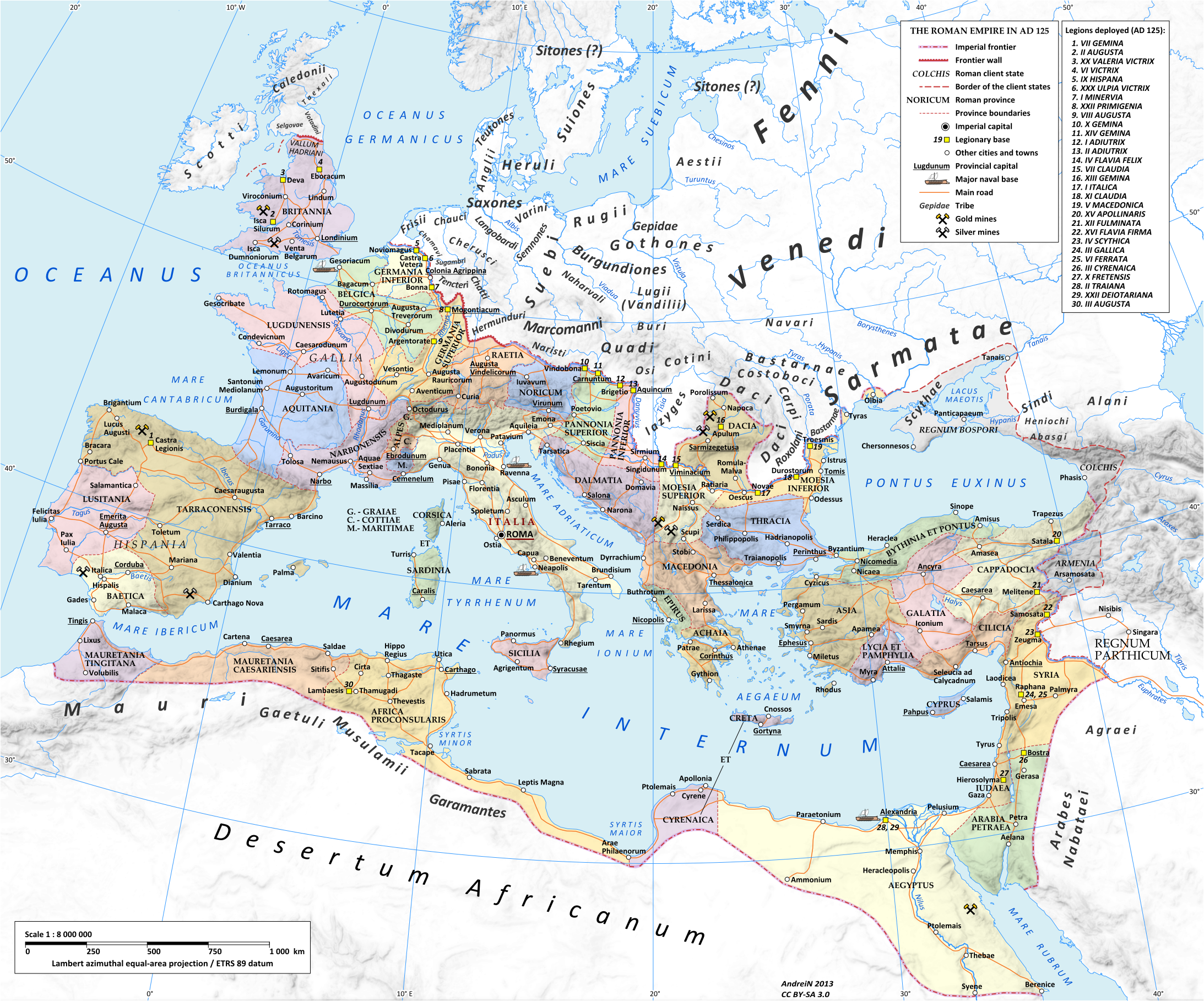
The Roman Empire at the time of Severianus. Armenia is shown as a Roman client state.

A Roman inscription found in modern Poitiers mentioning Severianus establishes this as his birthplace. The city was then known as Lemonum; it was in Roman Gaul, in an area inhabited by the Pictones. (Note: AE 1981, 640) His Gallic origins are also briefly mentioned by Lucian of Samosata. Another inscription (Note: AE 1913, 55 = ILS 1981) mentions that Severianus is from the tribe Quirina, which indicates that his ancestors had become Roman under either Claudius or the Flavians, like nearly all of the inhabitants of Gaul who had become Quirites during the 1st century.

== Family ==
Severinus' full pedigree was: Marcus Sedatius C. f. [i.e. Gaii filius] Severianus Iulius Acer Metillius Nepos Rufinus Ti. Rutilianus Censor. The transliteration of his name into Ancient Greek was: Μ. Σηδάτιος Σεουηριανὸς; (Note: Studia Pontica III, p.244 no.271)

The power of Severianus' wealthy family, the Sedatii, came from trade and commerce. The Sedatii depended on the Loire river, and were known to have had interests in Ostia, the port of Rome. The social and political rise of the Sedatii illustrates the decline of the aristocratic Iulii who had been the leading class in Roman Gaul since the time of the Julio-Claudian dynasty, the first dynasty of Roman emperors. The possible marriage of Severianus' father to Julia Rufina may have been a way of confirming the association between winemakers and land owners in Gaul.

Severianus is known to have had at least one son, Marcus Sedatius Severus Julius Reginus Gallus. All that is known of his son's career is that he was the patron of a college in Ostia. The name Julius Reginus probably came to him from his mother, Severianus' wife. It has been suggested that Severianus was adopted by his father-in-law. If true, this would mean that Sevarianus inherited the name from his mother.

== Early career ==
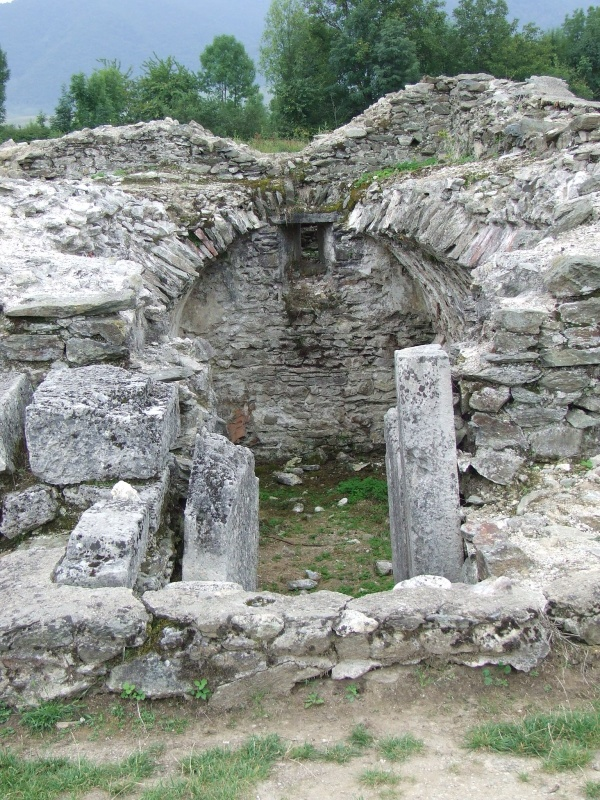
Ruins of the forum from the Roman colony, Sarmizegetusa, of which Severianus was the patron.

The first magisterial position which we know Severianus held was that of quaestor of Sicily; he would have supervised the provincial treasury and audited its accounts. Once having served as a quaestor, a man was admitted to the Senate. The political authority of the Senate was negligible, as the Emperor held the true power of the state. Membership of the Senate was sought after by individuals seeking prestige and social standing, rather than executive authority. Severianus probably became a senator late in the reign of Hadrian (r. 117–138). He is first mentioned as a senator in inscriptions from Ostia in the 140s. (Note: CIL XIV, 246, CIL XIV, 247, CIL XIV, 248, and CIL XIV, 250) The traditional Republican magistracy of tribune of the plebs followed, another prestigious position which had lost its independence and most of its practical functions. He is also recorded as having been the patron of a city, probably Cadurci (now Cahors) in Gaul. Next he served as a praetor, afterwards commanding the Legio V Macedonica which was stationed in Troesmis in Moesia Inferior on the lower Danube. He was then appointed curator, or overseer, of the Via Flaminia, the major road north from Rome over the Apennines.

Severianus was governor of Roman Dacia and commander of Legio XIII Gemina, which was stationed there, from 151 to 152. This is attested by many inscriptions from Dacia. Two inscriptions from Sarmizegetusa, the capital of Dacia, give his full name and states that he is the patron of the city. (Note: (ILS 9487); IDR III/2, 97 and IDR III/2, 98. See also CIL III, 1575; IDR III/1, 70 in From Mehadia.) The monuments that hold the inscriptions were erected after his consulship. Sarmizegetusa sent a message to Rome to congratulate Severianus and express its gratitude to him for his administration. (Note: CIL III, 1562 (ILS, 3896).)

In 153 Severianus was appointed consul for part of the year, from July to September, by Emperor Antoninus Pius. A consulship was the highest honour of the Roman state, and candidates were chosen carefully by the emperor. He served alongside Publius Septimius Aper, great-uncle of the future emperor Septimius Severus. (Note: Fasti Ostienses, fragment XXIX and CIL II, 2008; CIL II, 5)

== Cappadocia ==
Severianus is best known as the governor of Cappadocia in the late 150s. The position was important, for Cappadocia was a border province, which is why Severianus, with his military background and experience of frontier provinces, was assigned. Historian Marcel Le Glay suggests that his promotion was due to the support of Publius Mummius Sisenna Rutilianus, the governor of Asia who is famous as a follower of the self-described prophet Alexander of Abonoteichus thanks to the works of Lucian. In Cappadocia, Servianus' actions seem to have been popular: on an inscription from Zela he is honored as the benefactor (Greek: evergetes) and founder (Greek: ktistes) (Note: The term is an honorific and should not be taken literally. As patron Severianus was incorporated into the city's founding myth and eulogised accordingly.) of the city. He also appears on an inscription in Sebastopolis. (Note: IGR III, 113) As governor of Cappadocia Servianus was allocated two legions.

=== War with Parthia ===
In the summer of 161, the Parthian Vologases IV invaded Armenia, expelled the ruler Sohaemus placed there by the Romans, and installed his own relative Pacoras as king. Being governor of Cappadocia meant Severianus would be on the front line of any conflict involving Armenia, Alexander of Abonoteichus had enraptured Severianus, as he had the proconsul Rutilianus. (Note: On Alexander, see: Robin Lane Fox, Pagans and Christians (Harmondsworth: Penguin, 1986), 241–50.) Alexander convinced Severianus that he could defeat the Parthians easily, and win glory for himself. Severianus led a legion (perhaps the IX Hispana) into Armenia, but was trapped by the Parthian general Chosrhoes at Elegeia, a town just beyond the Cappadocian frontiers, near the headwaters of the Euphrates. Severianus made some attempt to fight Chosrhoes, but soon realized the futility of his campaign, and committed suicide. His legion was massacred. The campaign had only lasted three days. He was replaced as governor of Cappadocia by Marcus Statius Priscus.

Some historians believe that the defeat of Severianus at Elegeia explains the disappearance of the legions XXII Deiotariana and IX Hispana, but no proof exists that could confirm this hypothesis; the fate of the two legions is still controversial. (Note: The XXII Deiotariana is attested for the last time in Egypt in 119 : J. Schwartz, Où est passée la legio XXII Deiotariana ? , Zeitschrift für Papyrologie und Epigraphik, 76 (1989), pp. 101–102; the IX Hispana in Nijmegen in 130: P.J. Sijpesteijn, Die legio nona hispania in Nimwegen , Zeitschrift für Papyrologie und Epigraphik, 111 (1996), pp. 281–282.)

== Aftermath ==
L. Attidius Cornelianus, the governor of Syria, was also defeated by the Parthians. Co-Emperor Lucius Verus (he ruled with his adoptive brother Marcus Aurelius) took command against the Parthians and brought in reinforcements on a large scale. These included four whole legions and large detachments from many others. The war ended in a Roman victory five years later, with the capture and sack of the Parthian capital.

== Family tree ==
Family tree of Sedatius

M. Sedatius born c. 45	Julius Rufinus
C. Sedatius Severus born c. 75	Julia Rufina
M. Sedatius Severianus born c. 105	Regina
M. Sedatius Severus Julius Reginus born c. 130

== Bibliography ==
- Birley, Anthony R. (1993). Marcus Aurelius. Abingdon: Routledge. ISBN 978-0415171250.
- Birley, Anthony R. (2000). Septimius Severus: The African Emperor. London; New York: Routledge. ISBN 978-0415165914.
- Prosopographia Imperii Romani, S 231
- Mennen, Inge (2011). Power and Status in the Roman Empire, AD 193–284. Leiden: Brill. ISBN 978-90-04-20359-4.
- Picard, Gilbert Charles (1981). "Ostie et la Gaule de l'Ouest". Mélanges de l'École française de Rome. MEFRA (in French). 93 (2): 883–915. doi:10.3406/mefr.1981.1301.
- Smallwood, E. Mary (2010). Principates of Nerva, Trajan and Hadrian. Cambridge: Cambridge. ISBN 978-0-521-12894-0.

Political offices
Preceded by Sextus Caecilius Maximus, and Marcus Pontius Sabinus	Suffect consul of the Roman Empire; 153 with Publius Septimius Aper	Succeeded by Gaius Cattius Marcellus, and Quintus Petiedius Gallus
