= Elegeia =

Coordinates: 39°56′50″N 41°07′12″E

Elegeia (also Ēlegia) was a city of ancient Armenia located in modern Erzurum Province in northeastern Turkey; several important episodes between the Roman Empire, Armenia and the Parthians took place there.

== Location ==
The exact location of Elegeia is not completely certain. It is now believed to be located near Ilıca, between Erzurum and Aşkale. Here, there are remains of a Roman military fortress, though they are not properly investigated and are being gradually effaced by modern agriculture. Ptolemy located Elegeia at roughly the same latitude as Artaxata; Pliny the Elder placed it on the Euphrates river; Stephen of Byzantium indicates that Elegeia was beyond the Euphrates and that it was mentioned in book VIII of the Parthica of Arrian. In any case, Elegeia was an important stage in the road to Satala at the heart of the kingdom of Armenia.

== History ==
Due to its strategic location, Elegeia was often the scene of confrontations between Rome, Armenia and the Parthian or Persian empire. At least two important episodes took place there.

In 114, King Parthamasiris of Armenia came to meet Emperor Trajan there to receive his investiture. Trajan refused to make him king, and instead conquered Armenia. It was also from Elegeia that Trajan led campaigns against the northern neighbors of Armenia.

It was also in Elegeia that at the end of 161 or early 162 Marcus Sedatius Severianus was defeated by the Parthian army of Vologases IV of Parthia. Contrary to earlier assumptions, Juntunen has argued that the Roman military force destroyed by the Parthians was not a legion.
