= List of numismatists =

A coin collector is different from a numismatist, which is someone who studies coins. Many collectors are also numismatists, but some are not. Likewise, not all numismatists collect coins themselves.

- Andreas Alföldi
- Martin Allen
- Michel Amandry
- Augusto Carlos Teixeira de Aragão
- Simone Assemani
- Churchill Babington
- Soheir Bakhoum
- Anselmo Banduri
- Georges Bataille
- Jacob de Bie
- Carmen Arnold Biucchi
- Mark Blackburn
- Susanne Börner
- Osmund Bopearachchi
- Bartolomeo Borghesi
- Claude Gros de Boze
- Guillaume Budé
- Andrew Burnett
- Francesco Carelli
- Celestino Cavedoni
- Henry Cohen
- Joe Cribb
- Vesta Sarkhosh Curtis
- Elena Abramovna Davidovich
- Borka Dragojević-Josifovska
- Almudena Domínguez Arranz
- Théophile Marion Dumersan
- Stephan Ladislaus Endlicher
- Elizabeth Errington
- Giuseppe Fiorelli
- Martin Folkes
- Suzanne Frey-Kupper
- Julius Friedländer
- Andrea Fulvio
- Raffaele Garrucci
- Shpresa Gjongecaj
- Francesco Gnecchi
- Philip Grierson
- P. L. Gupta
- Vera Hatz
- Nicola Francesco Haym
- Stefan Heidemann
- David Hendin
- Josèphe Jacquiot
- Lyce Jankowski
- G. Kenneth Jenkins
- Eva Kolníková
- Dorota Malarczyk
- Harold Mattingly
- Dorothea Menadier
- Michael Metcalf
- Maria Millington Lathbury
- Theodor Mommsen
- Kyrylo Myzgin
- Zdenka Nemeškalová-Jiroudková
- Emanuela Nohejlová-Prátová
- Rosa Norström
- Joaquín Rubio y Muñoz
- Carlo Ottavio, Count Castiglione
- Elizabeth Pirie
- Adolf von Rauch (born 1805)
- Louis Robert
- Mohit Kapoor
- Desiré-Raoul Rochette
- Eduard Rüppell
- Edith Schönert-Geiß
- Camillo Serafini
- Umair Shah
- Francois Thierry
- Olaus Gerhard Tychsen
- Bernhard Karl von Koehne
- Dorothy B. Waage
- Helen Wang
- David Wigg-Wolf
- Jörgen Zoega

== See also ==
- List of coin collectors
