= List of numismatics awards =

This list of numismatics awards is an index to articles about notable awards given for significant contributions to the field of numismatics.

== Adna G. Wilde Jr. Memorial for Exemplary Service ==
Administered by the American Numismatic Association—named for Adna G. Wilde Jr, past president of the ANA, the award honors an ANA member who dedicates his or her time and resources to strengthen the hobby and further the educational mission of the ANA, and sets an example for others to follow.

== Akbar Silver Medal ==
Administered by the Numismatic Society of India.

== ANA Lifetime Achievement Award ==
Administered by the American Numismatic Association—This award is presented to an individual, family, firm or judicial entity that has made outstanding contributions to organized numismatics

== ANA Numismatist of the Year Award ==
Administered by the American Numismatic Association—first presented in 1995, the award was established to recognize individuals within the numismatic community who have demonstrated long-term leadership in the field and to the Association.

== ANS Distinguished Service Award ==
Awarded by the American Numismatic Society—in 2012 the ANS began to honor ANS volunteers at the Annual Dinner Gala who have dedicated their time and expertise to benefit the Society with The Distinguished Service Award.

== ANS Trustees' Award ==
Awarded by the American Numismatic Society—initiated in 2003 the ANS began the tradition of honoring deserving individuals with the Trustees’ Award at the ANS Annual Dinner Gala held in January. The Trustees confer the award on those individuals who have helped in extraordinary ways to forward the mission of the Society.

== Archer M. Huntington Award ==
Administered by the American Numismatic Society, this is an annual award recognising outstanding career contributions to numismatic scholarship. It is named for Archer M. Huntington, President of the ANS, 1905–1910.

== Art Kagin Ambassador Award ==
Administered by the Professional Numismatists Guild - named after a former PNG President and nationally known Iowa dealer who provided distinguished service as an advocate of numismatic goodwill.

== Blunt Prize ==
Administered by the British Numismatic Society – instituted in 1986 as the 'Council Prize', but its name was changed in 2005 to mark the outstanding contribution to the Society and to British Numismatics made by Christopher Evelyn Blunt (1904-1987). The Prize takes the form of a triennial cash award to an individual, whether a member of the Society or not, who has made a significant recent contribution to the study of numismatics which falls within the Society's remit. Its purpose is principally to encourage younger scholars, and preference is therefore given to suitable candidates under 35 years of age.

== British Numismatic Society Membership Medal ==
Administered by the British Numismatic Society—designed by John Lobban and struck at the Royal Mint, was produced in 1990. The bronze version may be ordered by any member, while the silver version may be ordered only by those who have completed 25 years or more of membership.

== Burnett Anderson Memorial Award for Excellence in Numismatic Writing ==
Presented annually to an author, journalist or researcher in recognition of their career contributions to the hobby. The award is sponsored by F&W Publications, and the winner is selected in a cooperative process by the American Numismatic Association (ANA), the American Numismatic Society (ANS) and the Numismatic Literary Guild (NLG).

== Chakra Vikram Medal of Gold and Silver ==
Administered by the Numismatic Society of India.

== C.H. Biddulph Bronze Medal ==
Administered by the Numismatic Society of India.

== Clement F. Bailey Memorial Award ==
Administered by the Numismatic Literary Guild -- "this award was endowed by Jim Miller of Miller Magazines in memory of an especially beloved member of the numismatic writing community and NLG founder, Clement F. Bailey. This award recognizes excellence among new writers in numismatics whose first published writings in this field appeared in hobby publications during the previous year. Nominees are supplied solely by numismatic publishers"

== The Clemy ==
Administered by the Numismatic Literary Guild -- "the winner of this award, the Guild’s highest honor, is chosen by the previous year’s recipient(s) from a list of nominees provided by the NLG Board of Directors"

== Derek Allen Prize ==
The Derek Allen Prize is administered by the British Academy—Founded in 1976 to honour Derek Allen, FBA, who was secretary (1969–73) and treasurer (1973–75) of the British Academy; it was established by his widow and sons to recognise outstanding scholarly achievement in Allen's principal interests: numismatics, Celtic studies and musicology.

== Duchalais, Prix ==
Administered by the Académie des Inscriptions et Belles Lettres

== Elvira Clain-Stefanelli Memorial Award for Achievement in Numismatics ==
Administered by the American Numismatic Association—Named for Elvira Clain-Stefanelli, the award was established and first given in 2013 to honor women who have made significant contributions to numismatics. These contributions, whether in research, leadership or mentorship, must have made a lasting impact on the numismatic community and demonstrated a lifelong commitment to the betterment of numismatics.

== Ernst von Sieglin Forschungspreis für NachwuchswissenschaftlerInnen der Klassischen Archäologie ==
The Ernst von Sieglin Preis is administered by the Institute of Classical Archaeology, University of Tubingen. An annual prize offered by the Sieglin family with the aim of supporting internationally highly recognised scholarship in Classical Archaeology - in line with von Sieglin's interests in Mediterranean archaeology and material culture.

== Farran Zerbe Memorial Award ==
The Farran Zerbe Memorial Award is administered by the American Numismatic Association (ANA) -- The highest honor conferred by the ANA, the Farran Zerbe Memorial Award is given in recognition of numerous years of outstanding, dedicated service to numismatics.

== GIG-Ehrenpreis ==
Administered by the Gesellschaft für Internationale Geschichte (Society for International History, Germany)

== Gilljam Prize for Third-Century Numismatics ==
Administered by the Royal Numismatic Society—named after Mr H.H. Gilljam, the prize is awarded every two years for the book or article published in the previous three years which, in its view, represents the best contribution to the numismatics of the third century before the reform of Diocletian, with preference given to studies in the coinage of the Gallic and British Empires.

== Gunnar Holst Medal ==
The Gunnar Holst Medal is administered by the Gunnar Holst Foundation for Numismatics, in Gothenburg, Sweden. Recipients include Mark Blackburn (2011), and David Hendin (2013).

== Harry J Forman Dealer of the Year ==
Administered by the American Numismatic Association—the award is named in honor of Harry J. Forman, a Philadelphia coin dealer, author and ANA Life Member who died in March 2008.

== Head Prize for Ancient Numismatics ==
Administered by the University of Oxford, the award is named in honour of Barclay V. Head. It was set up by his friends after his death.

== Howland Wood Memorial Award for Best-in-Show Exhibit ==
Administered by the American Numismatic Association—the ANA first presented the Howland Wood Memorial Award in 1952. “It is named for one of the ANA’s longtime and dedicated numismatists. During Howland Wood’s lifetime he served the ANA as its general secretary, a member of the board of governors, and both editor of The Numismatist and curator of the collections. The Howland Wood award is the most prestigious award given to exhibitors by the ANA.”

== Hubertus Goltzius Prize ==
Administered by the Royal Numismatic Society of Belgium—awarded every three years for "an unpublished scientific work devoted to a numismatic topic, in the broadest possible sense (coins, medals, coins, currency, currency weights, méreaux, techniques, etc.), concerning the Southern Netherlands, between the 5th and the 21st century. This work can be written in Dutch, French, German, English or Spanish". To be issued for the first time in 2019.

== Huntington Medal Award ==
Awarded by the American Numismatic Society—conferred annually in honor of the late Archer M. Huntington in recognition of outstanding career contributions to numismatic scholarship. The medal was designed in 1908 by Emil Fuchs to commemorate the 50th anniversary of the founding of the ANS.

== The IAPN Book Prize ==
Established in 1982, the IAPN Book Prize is awarded by the International Association of Professional Numismatists "to encourage the publication of books of scientific and general interest." It is an annual prize for a numismatic work published the previous year.

== James L. Miller Memorial Award ==
Administered by the Numismatic Literary Guild -- "this award, honoring the co-founder and longtime publisher of COINage magazine, recognizes the best numismatic article to appear in any medium, including both numismatic and non-numismatic magazines, newspapers and Internet Web sites"

== Jeffrey North Medal for Services to British Numismatics ==
Administered by British Numismatic Society—Instituted in 2008, for exceptional services to British Numismatics.

== Jessie Webb Award ==
Administered by the Numismatic Association of Victoria (Australia) -- Instituted in 2017. An annual award for the best article in the Victorian Numismatic Journal by a female member of an Australian numismatic society.

== Jeton de Vermeil ==
The Jeton de Vermeil is administered by the Société française de numismatique. Awarded annually to a foreign (non-French) scholar of numismatics, and every three years to the outgoing president of the society.

== Lhotka Memorial Prize ==
Administered by the Royal Numismatic Society—endowed in 1962 by the late Honorary Fellow, Professor J.F. Lhotka (University of Oklahoma), in memory of his father, Dr. J.F. Lhotka. It is awarded to the author of the book or article in English considered most helpful to the elementary student of numismatics and published in the previous two calendar years.

== Max Stern Trophy ==
Administered by the Numismatic Association of Victoria (Australia). Instituted in 1967, for the best numismatic paper presented to an Association meeting in a calendar year by a Member.

== Royal Numismatic Society, Medal of the ==
The Royal Numismatic Society, Medal of the is administered by the Royal Numismatic Society

== Nelson Wright Medal in Bronze ==
Administered by the Numismatic Society of India.

== North Book Prize ==
Administered by the British Numismatic Society—established in 2006 with a generous donation by Jeffrey North, is awarded every two years for the best book on British Numismatics.

== Otto Paul Wenger Award ==
Administered by the Association of Swiss Professional Numismatists.

== Parkes Weber Prize ==
The Parkes Weber Prize is administered by the Royal Numismatic Society—instituted in 1954 through the generosity of the late F. Parkes Weber, it is awarded for an original essay of not more than 5,000 words on any subject relating to coins, medals, medallions, tokens or paper money.

== Paul Simon Memorial Award ==
Administered by the Numismatic Association of Australia—instituted in 1977 by Mrs Jessica Simon, of Ballarat Victoria, in memory of her late husband. The Award was established to recognise the outstanding contribution by any person in promoting numismatics within numismatic organisations in Australia. The award consists of a medallion by Michael Meszaros, struck at the Paris Mint, which depicts a portrait of Paul Simon on the obverse, and a hand holding a coin of Israel on the reverse, together with a certificate.

== PNG Lifetime Achievement Award ==
Administered by the Professional Numismatists Guild.

== PNG Significant Contribution Award ==
Administered by the Professional Numismatists Guild.

== Prof. M.H. Krishna-Mythic Society Silver Medal ==
Administered by the Numismatic Society of India.

== Prof. M. Rama Rao Medal ==
Administered by the Numismatic Society of India.

== Quadrennial award of the Royal Belgian Numismatic Society ==
Administered by the Royal Belgian Numismatic Society "to the author of a scientific, original and unpublished dissertation treating a numismatic subject in the largest sense possible (coins, medals, counters, monetary technology …) or on a sigillographic of glyptographic subject."

== Ray Jewell Award ==
Administered by the Numismatic Association of Australia. Initiated in 1988, in honour of the founder and first President of the Association. The Award consists of two divisions, silver for outstanding contribution to Australian numismatics and the Numismatic Association of Australia; and bronze for the most outstanding article published in the Journal of The Numismatic Association of Australia over two consecutive volumes. The award consists of a medallion by Michael Meszaros, struck at the Paris Mint, which depicts a portrait of Paul Simon on the obverse, and an image of the Australian holey dollar on the reverse, together with a certificate.

== The Ribbit ==
Administered by the Numismatic Literary Guild -- "this award recognizes service to the hobby and to the NLG. The winner is selected by the previous year’s recipient"

== Robert Friedberg Award ==
Administered by the Professional Numismatists Guild - awarded for an outstanding book or other literature on numismatics.

== Samir Shamma Prize for Islamic Numismatics ==
The Samir Shamma Prize for Islamic Numismatics is administered by the Royal Numismatic Society—named after Mr Samir Shamma, instituted in 1992, the prized is awarded every two years for the book or article(s) published, normally and preferably in English, during the previous three years which in the view of the council is most useful to students of Islamic numismatics.

== J. Sanford Saltus Medal Award ==
The J. Sanford Saltus Medal Award is awarded by the American Numismatic Society—initiated in 1913 by J. Sanford Saltus to reward sculptors "for distinguished achievement in the field of the art of the medal." The silver medal was designed by A. A. Weinman, one of the finest American sculptors of the Beaux-Arts tradition and the second winner of the award.

== Sanford Saltus Gold Medal ==
The Sanford Saltus Gold Medal is administered by the British Numismatic Society—the premier distinction of the Society, awarded triennially, on the vote of Members, for the recipient's scholarly contributions to British Numismatics. The medal was established in 1910 with a generous donation by Mr John Sanford Saltus (1854-1922), a past-President of the Society.

== Shree T. Desikachari Silver Medal ==
Administered by the Numismatic Society of India.

== Société Royale de Numismatique de Belgique, Prix de la ==
Issued by Royal Numismatic Society of Belgium—awarded every four years, for the most original and unpublished numismatic work by a scholar under the age of 35. The award was first made in 1981.

== Sol Kaplan Award ==
Administered by the Professional Numismatists Guild.

== Vrenelipreis (Vreneli Award) ==
Awarded for numismatic achievement by MünzenRevue.

== World Money Fair Award ==
Fair for modern coinage.

== Ya’akov Meshorer Numismatic Prize ==
Established in 2001/2, the Ya'akov Meshorer Numismatic Prize, was established in his memory at the Israel Museum, thanks to the generous donations of numerous friends of the Israel Museum.
