= Gunnar Holst Medal =

The Gunnar Holst Medal is awarded annually to distinguished scholars of numismatics. It is awarded by the Gunnar Holst Numismatic Foundation of Göteborg, Sweden. It is named after Gunnar Holst, a numismatist who specialised in Islamic coins.

== Recipients of the Gunnar Holst medal ==
- 1991 Gert Rispling, Stockholm
- 1992 Patrick Bruun, Helsingfors
- 1993 Philip Grierson, Cambridge
- 1994 Martin Price, Athens
- 1995 Kolbjørn Skaare, Oslo
- 1996 Christian J. Simensen, Oslo
- 1997 Ulla Westermark, Stockholm
- 1998 Kenneth Jonsson, Stockholm
- 1999 Bertel Tingström, Uppsala
- 2000 Lars O. Lagerqvist, Stockholm
- 2001 Rune Ekre, Svenshögen, and Ioannis Touratsoglou, Athens
- 2002 Brita Malmer, Lidingö
- 2003 Peter Robert Franke, Munich
- 2004 Henrik Klackenberg, Stockholm
- 2005 Peter Spufford, Cambridge
- 2006 Ian Wiséhn, Stockholm
- 2007 Vera Hatz and Gert Hatz, Eutin
- 2008 Lucia Travaini, Rome
- 2009 Michael Metcalf, Oxford
- 2010 Gert Rispling, Norrtälje
- 2011 Mark Blackburn, Cambridge
- 2012 Carmen Arnold Biucchi, Cambridge, USA
- 2013 David Hendin, New York, and Rolf Sandström, Lindome
- 2014 Cécile Morrisson, Paris
- 2015 Ernst Nordin, Stockholm
- 2016 Bengt Holmén, Göteborg
- 2017 Michel Amandry, Paris
- 2018 Tuukka Talvio, Helsingfors
