= Abe Kosoff =

American coin dealer and numismatic writer (1912–1983)

- Born: Abraham Kosoff; December 31, 1912; New York City, United States
- Died: March 19, 1983 (aged 70); Palm Springs, California, United States
- Resting place: Wellwood Cemetery
- Education: New York University; Columbia University
- Occupations: Coin dealer, numismatic writer
- Spouse: Molly Katzke (m. 1933)
- Children: 2

Abraham Kosoff (December 31, 1912 – March 19, 1983), better known as Abe Kosoff, was an American coin dealer and numismatic writer.

== Biography ==
=== Education ===
Kosoff graduated from New York University and also studied at New York City College and Columbia University.

=== Career ===
Although he initially planned to become an accountant, Kosoff was hired by A. Celender in New York in 1929 to trade in antique jewelry and coins. Through this work, he recognized the profitability of the coin trade at the time.

His subsequent career remained closely connected with numismatics, initially as a dealer and later also as an author and editor. He opened his first coin shop in 1937 and established the Numismatic Gallery in New York in 1940. In 1948, he opened a branch in Beverly Hills, California. He entered into a partnership with Abner Kreisberg in 1944.

Operating under various business names, Kosoff conducted 85 numismatic auctions between 1940 and 1971, with a total of 106,590 lots. These included eight auctions held at conventions of the American Numismatic Association (ANA).

In 1954, he founded the Professional Numismatists Guild and served as its president during its first year. He held the presidency again from 1964 to 1965.

His numismatic publications included Early U. S. Dimes (1945). Kosoff worked with editor Kenneth Bressett on the American Numismatic Association's official grading standards for United States coins, first published in 1977. He also compiled the seventh edition of United States Pattern, Experimental and Trial Pieces, published in 1982.

Kosoff wrote a column called "Kosoff Commentary" for Coin World. His columns were collected and published in 1981 as Abe Kosoff Remembers. He also contributed regularly to Numismatic Scrapbook.

In 1982, he joined the Board of Overseers of Adelphi University's Institute of Numismatic and Philatelic Studies.

Kosoff's library was sold in two auctions conducted by George Kolbe in 1985. Bowers and Merena also auctioned his coin collection in New York in November 1985.

== Personal life ==
Kosoff married Molly Katzke on December 24, 1933. They had a son and a daughter.

He died at Eisenhower Center hospital in Palm Springs, California, on March 19, 1983, from a brain tumor.

== Awards and honors ==
- 1958: Medal of Merit, American Numismatic Association.
- 1972: Farran Zerbe Memorial Award, American Numismatic Association.
- 1973: Gold medal, International Association of Professional Numismatists.
- 1976: Founders Award, Professional Numismatists Guild.
- 1979: Clemy Award, Numismatic Literary Guild.
- 1979: Numismatic Ambassador Award, Florida United Numismatists.
- 1982: Induction into the American Numismatic Association's Numismatic Hall of Fame.
- 2012: Induction into the Professional Coin Grading Service Hall of Fame.
