= Medal of the Royal Numismatic Society =

The Medal of the Royal Numismatic Society was first awarded in 1883. It is awarded by the Royal Numismatic Society and is one of the highest markers of recognition given to numismatists. The president and Council award the medal annually to an "individual highly distinguished for services to Numismatic Science".

In recent years the medallist has been invited to receive the medal in person and to give a lecture, usually at the society's December Meeting.

Sir John Evans gave the dies for the original silver medal to the society in 1883. A subsequent medal was commissioned from Ian Rank-Broadley in 1993 and was a cast silver medal with the classical theme of Heracles and the Nemean lion. The society commissioned Robert Elderton to create a new medal after 2019, the first of which was presented to Carmen Arnold Biucchi in 2022.

== List of medallists ==
Recipients of the Medal of the Royal Numismatic Society and their lecture titles (where available) are given below.
Further details about the individual medallists and their contributions to the field of numismatics can be found in the Numismatic Chronicle.

- 1883 Charles Roach Smith (1807–1890)
- 1884 Aquilla Smith (1806–1890)
- 1885 Edward Thomas (1813–1886)
- 1886 Alexander Cunningham (1814–1893)
- 1887 John Evans (1823–1908)
- 1888 Friedrich Imhoof-Blumer (1838–1920)
- 1889 Percy Gardner (1846–1937)
- 1890 Jan Pieter Six (1824–1899)
- 1891 C. Ludwig Müller (1809–1891)
- 1892 R. Stuart Poole (1832–1895)
- 1893 W.H. Waddington (1826–1894)
- 1894 Charles Francis Keary (1848–1917)
- 1895 Theodor Mommsen (1817–1903)
- 1896 Frederic W. Madden (1839–1904)
- 1897 Alfred von Sallet (1842–1897)
- 1898 William Greenwell (1820–1918)
- 1899 Ernest Babelon (1854–1924)
- 1900 Stanley Lane-Poole (1854–1931)
- 1901 S.E. Baron Wladimir von Tiesenhausen (1825–1902)
- 1902 Arthur J. Evans (1851–1941)
- 1903 Gustave Schlumberger (1844–1929)
- 1904 His Majesty Victor Emmanuel III, King of Italy (1869–1947)
- 1905 Sir Hermann Weber (1823–1918)
- 1906 Francesco Gnecchi (1847–1919)
- 1907 Barclay V. Head (1844–1914)
- 1908 Heinrich Dressel (1845–1920)
- 1909 Herbert A. Grueber (1846–1927)
- 1910 Friedrich Edler von Kenner (1834–1922)
- 1911 Oliver Codrington (1837–1921)
- 1912 Max von Bahrfeldt (1856–1936)
- 1913 George Macdonald (1862–1940)
- 1914 Jean N. Svoronos (1863–1922)
- 1915 George Francis Hill (1867–1948)
- 1916 Théodore Reinach (1860–1928)
- 1917 L.A. Lawrence (1857–1949)
- 1918 Not awarded
- 1919 Adrien Blanchet (1866–1957)
- 1920 H.B. Earle-Fox and J.S. Shirley-Fox
- 1921 Percy H. Webb
- 1922 Frederick A. Walters
- 1923 J.W. Kubitschek (1858–1936)
- 1924 Henry Symonds
- 1925 Edward T. Newell (1886–1941)
- 1926 R.W. Maclachlan
- 1927 Adolphe Dieudonné
- 1928 Sir Charles Oman (1860–1946)
- 1929 Jules Maurice
- 1930 Edward A. Sydenham
- 1931 Helen Farquhar (1859–1953)
- 1932 H. Nelson Wright (1870–1941)
- 1933 Kurt Regling
- 1934 George C. Brooke (posthumously)
- 1935 Behrendt Pick (1861–1940)
- 1936 John Allan (1884–1955)
- 1937 Victor Tourneur
- 1938 J. Grafton Milne
- 1939 J.W.E. Pearce
- 1940 R. B. Whitehead (1879–1967)
- 1941 Harold Mattingly (1884–1964)
- 1942 E.S.G. Robinson (1887–1976)
- 1943 Agnes Baldwin Brett (1876–1955)
- 1944 Leonard Forrer (1869–1953)
- 1945 Charles Seltman (1886–1957)
- 1946 Georg Galster
- 1947 Eduard von Zambaur
- 1948 Jocelyn M.C. Toynbee (1897–1985)
- 1949 Sydney P. Noe (1885–1969)
- 1950 Karl Pink
- 1951 H.L. Rabino (posthumously)
- 1952 Lodovico Laffranchi
- 1953 Andreas Alföldi (1895–1981)
- 1954 C. Humphrey V. Sutherland (1908–1986)
- 1955 A.R. Bellinger (1893–1978)
- 1956 John Walker (1900–1964)
- 1957 George C. Miles
- 1958 Philip Grierson (1910–2006)
- 1959 Oscar Ulrich-Bansa (1895–1973)
- 1960 C. Wilson Peck (1914–2004)
- 1961 Henri Seyrig (1895–1973)
- 1962 Michael Grant (1914–2004)
- 1963 Willy Schwabacher
- 1964 Anne S. Robertson (1910–1997)
- 1965 Jean Lafaurie
- 1966 Derek F. Allen (1910–1975)
- 1967 Margaret Thompson (1911–1992)
- 1968 Paul Balog 1900–1982)
- 1969 Christopher Evelyn Blunt (1904–1987)
- 1970 Pierre Bastien
- 1971 Herbert A. Cahn (1915–2002)
- 1972 Robert A.G. Carson (1918–2006)
- 1973 H. Enno van Gelder
- 1974 George Le Rider
- 1975 G. Kenneth Jenkins (1918–2005)
- 1976 J.-B. Colbert de Beaulieu
- 1977 P. Lal Gupta (1914–2001)
- 1978 Colin M. Kraay (1918–1982)
- 1979 Peter Berghaus
- 1980 Patrick Bruun
- 1981 Michael Dolley
- 1982 Otto Mørkholm
- 1983 Theodore V. Buttrey (1929–2018)
- 1984 Michael H. Crawford
- 1985 Paul Naster
- 1986 Brita Malmer (1925–2013)
- 1987 D. Michael Metcalf (1933–2018)
- 1988 Peter R. Franke
- 1989 Leandre Villaronga
- 1990 John P.C. Kent (1928–2000)
- 1991 Eric P. Newman (1911–2017)
- 1992 Martin J. Price (1939–1995)
- 1993 Andrew Burnett
- 1994 Cécile Morrisson
- 1995 Maria Alföldi
- 1996 Lord Stewartby (1935–2018)
- 1997 Jørgen Steen Jensen
- 1998 Jean-Baptiste Giard (1932–2018)
- 1999 Joseph E. Cribb
- 2000 Richard Doty (1942–2013)
- 2001 Ulla Westermark (1927–2020)
- 2002 Nicholas Mayhew
- 2003 Gert Hatz and Vera Hatz
- 2004 Michel Amandry
- 2005 Peter Spufford – The Mints of Medieval Europe
- 2006 François Thierry – The Identification of the Nguyen Thong coins in the monetary law of the sixth year of Canh Hung (Vietnam 1745)
- 2007 Wolfgang Hahn – Christian symbolism on Aksumite coins – the typological concept and composition
- 2008 Mark Blackburn (1953–2011) – Interpreting single-finds in a bullion economy: the case of dirhams in Viking-Age Scandinavia
- 2009 Richard Reece – What are Coin Finds?
- 2010 Alan Stahl – Learning from the Zecca: the Medieval Mint of Venice as a Model for Pre-modern Minting
- 2011 Marion Archibald (1935–2016) – Leaden Pennies
- 2012 Lucia Travaini – Coins as Bread. Bread as Coins
- 2013 Michael Alram – From Bactria to Gandhara: Coins and Peoples across the Hindu Kush
- 2014 Roger Bland – What Happened to Gold Coinage in the 3rd Century AD?
- 2015 Bernd Kluge – Pound Sterling, English Coins and English Numismatics from a Continental Perspective
- 2016 Pere Pau Ripollès Alegre – The Iberian Coinages, 6th- 1st century BC
- 2017 Lutz Ilisch – European silver exports to Syria and a Crusader-Ayyubid condominial mint
- 2018 Johan van Heesch – A new representation of the Antwerp mint (AD 1625)
- 2019 Sam Moorhead
- 2020 Keith Rutter
- 2021 François de Callataÿ
- 2022 Carmen Arnold-Biucchi - "Per the Fayum hoard 1933-34: Egyptian Imitations or Athenian Owls?"
- 2023 Shin'ichi Sakuraki - "Numismatic archaeology in Japan: a personal retrospective"
- 2024 Helen Wang
