= Pere Pau Ripollès Alegre =

Pere Pau Ripollès Alegre (born 1953) is a Spanish archaeologist and numismatist.

== Career ==
Ripollès studied at the University of Valencia for a first degree in history and geography (1978) and a PhD in archaeology. His thesis was titled “La circulación monetaria en la Tarraconense Mediterránea“. He remained at the University of Valencia as From 1980 to 1984 he was assistant professor at the Department of Prehistory and Archaeology (1980–84), Associate Professor (1984–86), and professor (1986–). His habilitation thesis focussed on the minting of coins in the Iberian city of Saitabi.

Although his career has been based at the University of Valencia, he has carried out research at numismatic institutions around the world, including as visiting professor at Oxford University and the University of Bologna.

Ripollès is also active in the international numismatic community, as Corresponding Member of the Real Academia de la Historia (Madrid); editor of the International Numismatic e-Newsletter of the International Numismatic Council (2009–15), and since 2015 as a vice-president of the International Numismatic Council (INC).

== Honours and awards ==
- 2016 - The Medal of the Royal Numismatic Society
- 1998 - The Jeton de Vermeil
