= Jeton de vermeil =

The Jeton de vermeil is an award recognising scholarly achievement in numismatics. It is awarded by the Société française de numismatique annually to a foreign (non-French) numismatic scholar, and every three years to the outgoing president of the society. It was formerly known as the Médaille de vermeil. It is a widely recognised award for numismatics.

The medal was created in 1932–36 by Lucien Bazor, engraver at the Paris Mint, thanks to a bequest to the Society from Pierre Babut (who was President of the Society, 1907-1908 and 1912–1913).

== Recipients of the Médaille de vermeil ==
- 1934 - G.F. Hill
- 1935 - V. Tourneur
- 1936 - E.T. Newell
- 1939 - H. Mattingly

== Recipients of the Jeton de vermeil ==
- 1969 - K. Castelin
- 1971 - R.A.G. Carson
- 1972 - P. Balog
- 1973 - H.A. Cahn
- 1974 - P. Bruun
- 1976 - R. Kiersnowski
- 1977 - L. Villaronga
- 1978 - M.R. Alfoeldi
- 1979 - M.D. Metcalf
- 1980 - T. Hackens
- 1981 - G. Belloni
- 1982 - S. Suchodolski
- 1983 - S. Scheers
- 1984 - M. Crawford
- 1985 - R. Weiller
- 1986 -
- 1987 - G. Gorini, E.A. Arslan
- 1988 - M. Archibald
- 1989 - A. Kunisz
- 1990 -
- 1991 - M. Blackburn
- 1992 - G. Demski
- 1993 - H.U. Geiger
- 1994 - A. Johnston
- 1995 - N. Mayhew
- 1996 - A. Geiser
- 1997 - A. Pol
- 1998 - P.P. Ripollès
- 1999 - L. Travaini
- 2000 - S. Gjongecaj
- 2001 - W. Hahn
- 2002 - Y. Touratsoglou
- 2003 - M. Crusafont i Sabater
- 2004 - A. Burnett
- 2005 - U. Klein
- 2006 - F. de Callataÿ
- 2007 - A. Saccoci
- 2008 - W. Metcalf
- 2009 - Benedikt Zäch (Winterthur coin cabinet)
- 2010 - M. Alram
- 2011 - E. Oberländer
- 2012 - R. Bland
- 2013 - A. Rovelli
- 2014 - C. Arnold-Biucchi
- 2015 - P. Ilisch
- 2016 - J. van Heesch
- 2017 - J. Chr. Moesgaard
- 2018 - K. Butcher
- 2019 - Helen Wang (British Museum)
- 2020 - M. Michele Asolati
- 2021 - B. Woytek (Österreichisches Archäologisches Institut)
- 2022 - Christof Boehringer
- 2023 - Abdelhamid Fenina
- 2024 - Suzanne Frey-Kupper
