= Ulla Westermark =

Swedish numismatist (1927–2020)

- Born: 30 March 1927
- Died: 22 February 2020 (aged 92)
- Occupations: Numismatist; curator
- Known for: Expertise in Greek coinage
- Awards: Medal of the Royal Numismatic Society Huntingdon Medal Award Gunnar Holst Medal

Academic background
- Education: Högre allmänna läroverket för flickor, Örebro
- Alma mater: Stockholm University
- Thesis: Das Bildnis des Philetairos von Pergamon. Corpus der Münzprägung (1961)
- Academic advisor: Willy Schwabacher

Academic work
- Discipline: Numismatics
- Sub-discipline: Greek numismatics
- Institutions: Economy Museum - Royal Coin Cabinet
- Notable works: Sylloge Nummorum Graecorum

Ulla Westermark (30 March 1927 – 22 February 2020) was a Swedish numismatist, who was a specialist in Ancient Greek coinage. She was Director of the Stockholm Coin Cabinet from 1979 to 1983 and was recognised with awards for her contributions to numismatics from the Royal Numismatic Society, the American Numismatic Society, the International Monetary History Society and the Swedish Numismatic Society.

== Biography ==
Ulla Lundström was born on 30 March 1927 in Trollhättan. She attended the Högre allmänna läroverket för flickor (Higher General School for Girls) in Örebro until 1947. She then studied Literature, Art History and Archaeology at Stockholm University, graduating in 1954. One of her tutors there was the German numismatist Willy Schwabacher (de), a specialist in ancient Greek currency, who inspired her interest in numismatics. Later in her career she continued some of Schwabacher's work on the coinage of Amphipolis.

Lundström married Per Westermark (1929–1954) in 1952.

In 1959 Westermark completed her doctoral thesis, which was subsequently published in 1961, entitled: Das Bildnis des Philetairos von Pergamon. Corpus der Münzprägung ("The portrait of Philetairos of Pergamon. Corpus of coinage"). In it she divided the Attic Philetairos coins into seven groups; the dating of which has been revised since her thesis. From 1961 she also worked at the Royal Cabinet of Coins, latterly as its Director from 1979 to 1983. In that period he published one of the most notable monographs, entitled The Coinage of Kamaria, written with G. Kenneth Jenkins, and published in 1980 by the Royal Numismatic Society. She stepped away from the role of Director in 1983, citing a desire to work more closely with the collection itself; she retired from work at the institution in 1992.

Between 1986 and 1996, partly whilst in her retirement, she continued to work as the coordinator of the monumental work Sylloge Nummorum Graecorum and worked on the elaboration of a corpus of coins promoted by the Swedish Numismatic Society. For this work, numismatist G. Kenneth Jenkins credited the impressive feat of production to Westermark. An expert on Hellenistic coinages, she specialised in the coinages of Sicily, those of the Macedonian kings, and bronze coinages.

== Recognition ==
In 2002 Harald Nilsson edited a Festschrift dedicated to Westermark on the occasion of her 75th birthday, to which 47 numismatic specialists in Ancient Greek currency contributed. She was also recognized as an honorary member of the International Council of Numismatics and of the Royal Numismatic Society, and as a corresponding member of the Swedish Numismatic Society (1967).

== Awards ==
- (1995): Prize of the International Monetary History Society.
- (1997): Gunnar Holst Medal.
- (1997): Huntington Medal Award - American Numismatic Society.
- (2001): Medal of the Royal Numismatic Society.

== Selected works ==
- Westermark, Ulla. "The Coinage of Akragas c. 510-406: Studia numismatica Upsaliensia." (2018).
- Westermark, Ulla. The Coinage of Akragas c. 510–406 BC. Part 2: Catalogue. Acta Universitatis Upsaliensis, 2018.
- Westermark, Ulla. Influences from South Italy on Early Macedonian Bronze Coins. na, 1996.
- Westermark, Ulla, G. K. Jenkins, and G. K. Jenkins. "The coinage of Kamarina: Special publication/Royal Numismatic Society." (1980).
- Westermark, U. L. L. A. "The fifth century bronze coinage of Akragas." Atti del VI Convegno del Centro Internazionale di Studi Numismatici, Rome (AIIN, suppl. 25) (1979): 3–25.
