= Shidai =

Shidai may refer to:

- Osaka City University
- Shimonoseki City University
- Yokohama City University
