= Paul Balog =

Paul Balog may refer to:

- Paul Balog (bishop of Veszprém) (died 1275), Hungarian prelate
- Paul Balog (bishop of Pécs) (died 1306), bishop in the Kingdom of Hungary
- Paul Balog (numismatist) (1900–1982), Hungarian-born Italian numismatist
