= Shin'ichi Sakuraki =

Japanese numismatist

- 櫻木 晋一
- Education: doctorate
- Occupation: Numismatist, academic
- Employer: Asahi University (2019–); Shimonoseki City University
- Awards: Medal of the Royal Numismatic Society

Shin'ichi Sakuraki (櫻木 晋一, Sakuraku Shinichi) is a Japanese numismatist and archaeologist, who, in 2023, was awarded the medal of the Royal Numismatic Society. Formerly with Shimonoseki University, in 2019, he was appointed Professor in the Faculty of Business Administration at Asahi University.

Along with Nobuhisa Furuta and Lyce Jankowski, Sakuraki has catalogued the collection of East Asian coins at the Ashmolean Museum. His essay on pre-Meiji currency in Japan, in Catalogue of the Japanese Coin Collection (pre-Meiji) at the British Museum: With Special Reference to Kutsuki Masatsuna was described as of "immeasurable use to scholars and collectors who do not read Japanese". He is part of a network of researchers who have been researching hoards from northern Vietnam. He has also donated material to the Fitzwilliam Museum.

== Selected works ==
- Sakuraki, Shin’ichi. "A Brief History of Pre-modern Japanese Coinage." Catalogue of the Japanese Coin Collection (pre-Meiji) at the British Museum (2010): 17.
- Sakuraki, Shin’ichi, and Nobuhisa Furuta. "Kutsuki Masatsuna as Collector and Numismatist." Catalogue of the Japanese Coin Collection (pre-Meiji) at the British Museum (2010): 49.
- Sakuraki, Shin’ichi. "New Developments in Japanese Numismatic History." A Survey of Numismatic Research 2007 (2002): 578-581.
- Sakuraki, Shin’ichi (ed.) Kaheinimiru Dynamism: Ou Chu Nichi Hikakuno Shitenkara (Dynamism in Coinage: Europe, China and Japan, Comparative Viewpoints), Dai 12 kai Shutsudosenkakenkyukai Houkokuyoushi in Fukuoka 2005 (Proceedings of the 12th Conference of the Coin Finds Research Group held in Fukuoka 2005), ed. Shinichi Sakuraki (Fukuoka, 2005), 7-50 (in English and Japanese)
