= Gnecchi =

Gnecchi is a surname. Notable people with the surname include:

- Francesco Gnecchi (1847–1919), Italian painter and numismatist
- Gianluca Gnecchi (born 1992), Italian rugby referee
- Vittorio Gnecchi (1876–1954), Italian composer

== See also ==
- Gnocchi, a type of pasta
