= Nicholas Mayhew =

British numismatist

Nicholas Julian Mayhew (Nick Mayhew) (1948 - 17 August 2024) was a British numismatist and historian. Mayhew was Emeritus Professor of Numismatics and Monetary History, at the Ashmolean Museum, specialising in British and European medieval monetary history and numismatics. He was formerly deputy director (Collections) at the Ashmolean Museum. He first joined the Ashmolean Museum in 1971. Mayhew died on 17 August 2024.

== Awards and honours ==
- 1995 - Jeton de Vermeil - awarded by the Société française de numismatique
- 2002 - Medal of the Royal Numismatic Society
- 2015 - Money, Prices and Wages: Essays in Honour of Professor Nicholas Mayhew, ed. by Martin Allen and D’Maris Coffman (Palgrave Macmillan, 2015).

== Publications ==
- 1988 - Coinage in France from the Dark Ages to Napoleon (Seaby)
- 1997 - The gros tournois : proceedings of the Fourteenth Oxford Symposium on Coinage and Monetary History Royal Numismatic Society Special Publication 31.
- 1999 - Sterling: the rise and fall of a currency (Allen Lane, Penguin)
- 2006 - Changing Values in Medieval Scotland: A study of prices, money, and weights and measures, with Elizabeth Gemmill (CUP).
- 2008 - "Research in English museums : university and regional museums", in Görel Cavalli-Björkman and Svante Lindqvist (eds), Research and Museums: Proceedings of an International Symposium in Stockholm 22–25 May 2007, pp. 148–159.
