= Derek Allen Prize =

Annual prize in Celtic studies, musicology, and numismatics

The Derek Allen Prize is an awarded annually by the British Academy, rotating between prizes in Celtic studies, musicology, and numismatics. Among the Academy's many regular awards, it was founded in 1976 to honour Derek Allen, who served as secretary (1969–73) and treasurer (1973–75) of the Academy. It was established by his widow and sons to recognise outstanding scholarly achievement in Allen's three principal interests. Recipients are awarded £400.

== List of recipients ==
Derek Allen Prize Recipients
Year	Recipient	Discipline	Primary affiliation(s)
1977	Musicology	Oliver Strunk	Princeton University
1978	Numismatics	Karel Castelin	Czech Numismatic Society
1979	Celtic studies	Kenneth Jackson	University of Edinburgh
1980	Musicology	Julian Budden	BBC
1981	Numismatics	J. B. Colbert de Beaulieu	
1982	Celtic studies	Brian Ó Cuív	University College Dublin
1983	Musicology	David Brown	University of Southampton
1984	Numismatics	Simone Scheers	KU Leuven
1985	Celtic studies	J. E. Caerwyn Williams	Aberystwyth University
1986	Musicology	Reinhard Strohm	King's College London
1987	Numismatics	Georges Le Rider	Bibliothèque nationale de France
1988	Celtic studies	Edouard Bachellery	
1989	Musicology	John Stevens	University of Cambridge
1990	Numismatics	P. Bastien	
1991	Celtic studies	K. H. Schmidt	
1992	Musicology	David Cairns	
1993	Numismatics	Jean Lafaurie	
1994	Celtic studies	Eric P. Hamp	University of Chicago
1995	Musicology	Peter Holman	The Parley of Instruments
1996	Numismatics	J. P. C. Kent	
1997	Celtic studies	Proinsias Mac Cana	Dublin Institute for Advanced Studies; University College Dublin
1998	Musicology	Peter Walls	
1999	Numismatics	Cécile Morrisson	Bibliothèque nationale de France
2000	Celtic studies	Derick Thomson	University of Glasgow
2001	Musicology	Janice Stockigt	University of Melbourne
2002	Numismatics	Gert Hatz	
2003	Celtic studies	Pádraig Ó Riain	University College Cork
2004	Musicology	Colin Timms	University of Birmingham
2005	Numismatics	Philip Grierson	University of Cambridge
2006	Celtic studies	Daniel Huws	National Library of Wales
2007	Musicology	Philip Bohlman	University of Chicago
2008	Numismatics	Michael Metcalf	University of Oxford
2009	Celtic studies	Dafydd Jenkins	University of Aberystwyth
2010	Musicology	Gary Tomlinson	University of Pennsylvania
2011	Numismatics	Mark Blackburn	Fitzwilliam Museum, Cambridge
2012	Celtic studies	Fergus Kelly	Dublin Institute for Advanced Studies
2013	Musicology	Arnold Whittall	King's College London
2014	Numismatics	Richard Reece	University College London
2015	Celtic studies	Pierre-Yves Lambert	Centre national de la recherche scientifique
2016	Musicology	Margaret Bent	University of Oxford
2017	Numismatics	Michael Crawford	University College London
2018	Celtic studies	Máire Herbert	University College Cork
2019	Musicology	Alejandro Planchart	University of California, Santa Barbara
2020	Numismatics	Andrew Burnett	British Museum
2021	Celtic studies	Ralph A. Griffiths	Swansea University
2022	Musicology	Suzanne G. Cusick	New York University
2023	Numismatics	Joe Cribb	Hebei Normal University
2024	Celtic studies	Erich Poppe	University of Marburg
2025	Musicology	Owen Wright	SOAS University of London
