= Rosa Norström =

Swedish numismatist

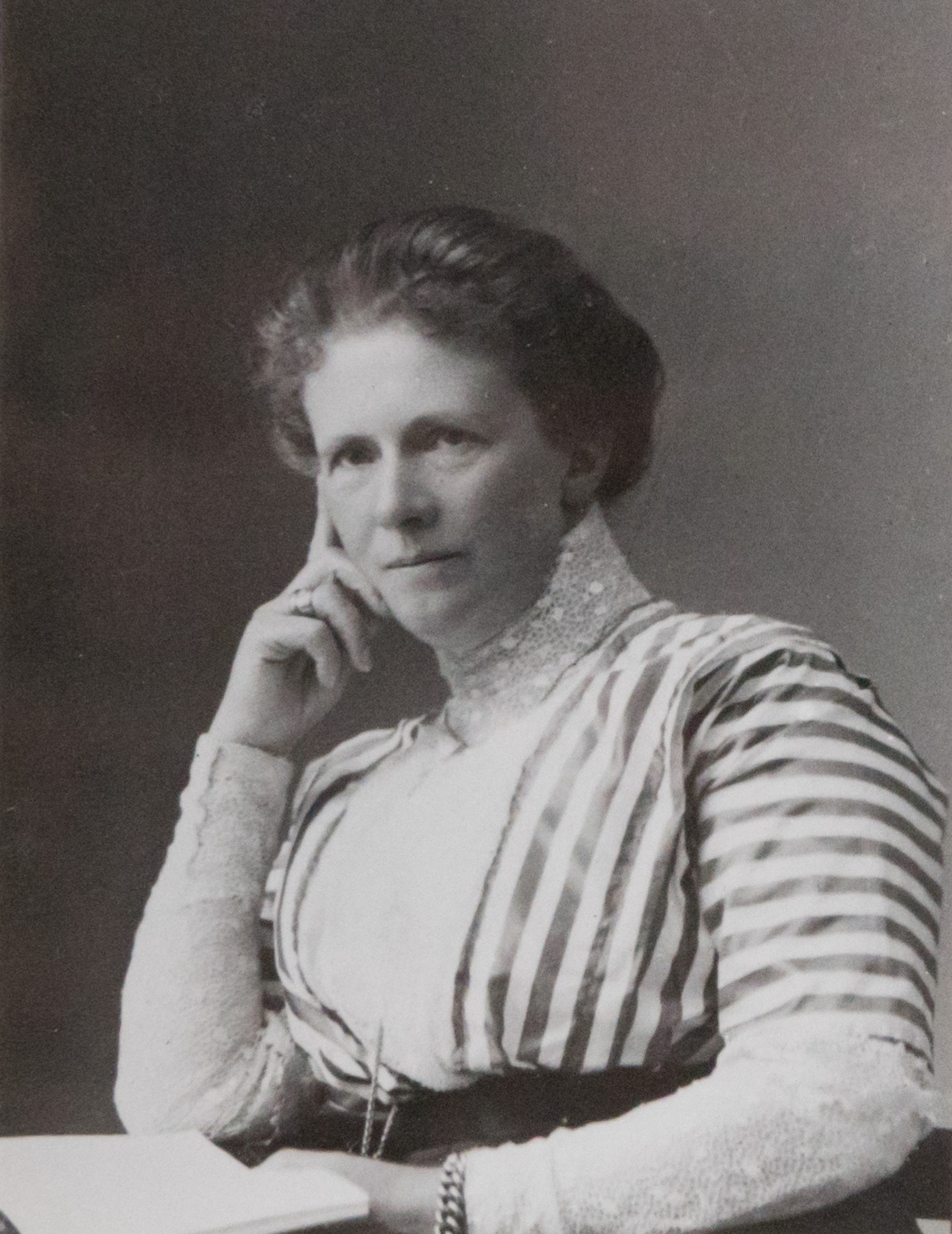
- Born: November 13, 1860
- Died: May 24, 1944 (aged 83)
- Occupation: Numismatist
- Employer: Royal Coin Cabinet
- Father: Wilhelm Theodor Strokirk

Rosa Norström (13 November 1860 – 24 May 1944) was a Swedish numismatist and museum curator at the Royal Coin Cabinet, who published an account of the discovery of a hoard of 646 Roman denarii in Gotland.

== Biography ==
Born Rosa Strokirk on 13 November 1860, her father was the numismatist Wilhelm Theodor Strokirk (sv). She began work at the Swedish Academy of Sciences in 1899, as an assistant at the Royal Coin Cabinet. Between 1899 and 1929, according to Timo Talvio, she was essentially "in charge of the cabinet", where she led rearrangement of some of the series held in the collection. The American Journal of Archaeology recorded her publication of the discovery of a hoard of Roman denarii from Sigdes, near Burs in Gotland. The hoard contained 646 coins, dating from the reigns of Nero to Septimus Severus (64–195 AD).

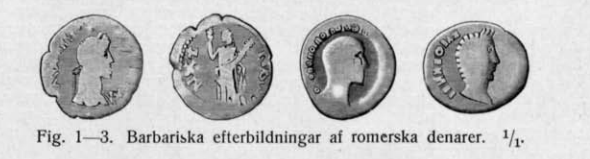
Roman denarii from Sigdes, Gotland, Sweden

Norström died on 24 May 1944; her husband, Major Manne Norström, predeceased her – he had died in 1897. Her work has been identified by Stig Welinder as one of the earliest women, along with Märta Leijonhufvud and Sigrid Leijonhufvud, to publish in the journal Fornvännen. Welinder characterises this as part of the women's rights movement in Sweden.

== Articles ==
- Norström, Rosa. "Myntfynd från Bösarps kyrkogård, Skytts härad, Skåne." Fornvännen 1 (1906): 191–195.
- Norström, Rosa. "Romerskt myntfynd från Sigdes i Burs socken, Gotland." Fornvännen 2 (1907): 202–203.
