= Fornvännen =

Swedish academic journal

- Discipline: Archaeology, Art history
- Language: Swedish, English, German
- Edited by: Mats Roslund

Publication details
- History: 1906–present
- Publisher: Royal Swedish Academy of Letters, History and Antiquities
- Frequency: Quarterly
- Open access: Delayed, 6 months

Standard abbreviations
- ISO 4: Fornvännen

Indexing
- ISSN: 0015-7813 (print); 1404-9430 (web)

Links
- Journal homepage

Fornvännen (transl. 'The Friend of the Distant Past'), Journal of Swedish Antiquarian Research is a Swedish academic journal in the fields of archaeology and Medieval art. It is published quarterly by the Royal Swedish Academy of Letters, History and Antiquities in Stockholm, Sweden. The journal's contributions are written in the Scandinavian languages, English, or German with summaries in English. The editor-in-chief is Mats Roslund. The editorial board practices double blind peer review with external reviewers.

Fornvännen began publication in 1906 when it replaced two earlier journals, Svenska Fornminnesföreningens Tidskrift and Vitterhetsakademiens Månadsblad. Early contributors included noted archaeologists Oscar Montelius and Hans Hildebrand. Stig Welinder has noted that the journal included articles by women from an early stage, including those of Rosa Norström and Sigrid Leijonhufvud, and characterises this as part of the women's rights movement in Sweden.

Since 2000 it has an online version, since 2007 its first 100 annual volumes have been available on-line, and since 2009 Fornvännen is published as a delayed open-access journal with the online version of each issue appearing six months after the paper version on the portal DiVA.

Fornvännen is an ERIH category B journal a category now known as INT2. According to Ulrich's Periodicals Directory, it is indexed in Anthropological Index Online, Anthropological Literature, British & Irish Archaeological Bibliography (Online Edition), Nordic Archaeological Abstracts, and FRANCIS. It was previously also indexed in Internationale Bibliographie der Rezensionen Geistes- und Sozialwissenschaftlicher Literatur and Linguistic Bibliography.
