= Johan van Heesch =

Belgian numismatist

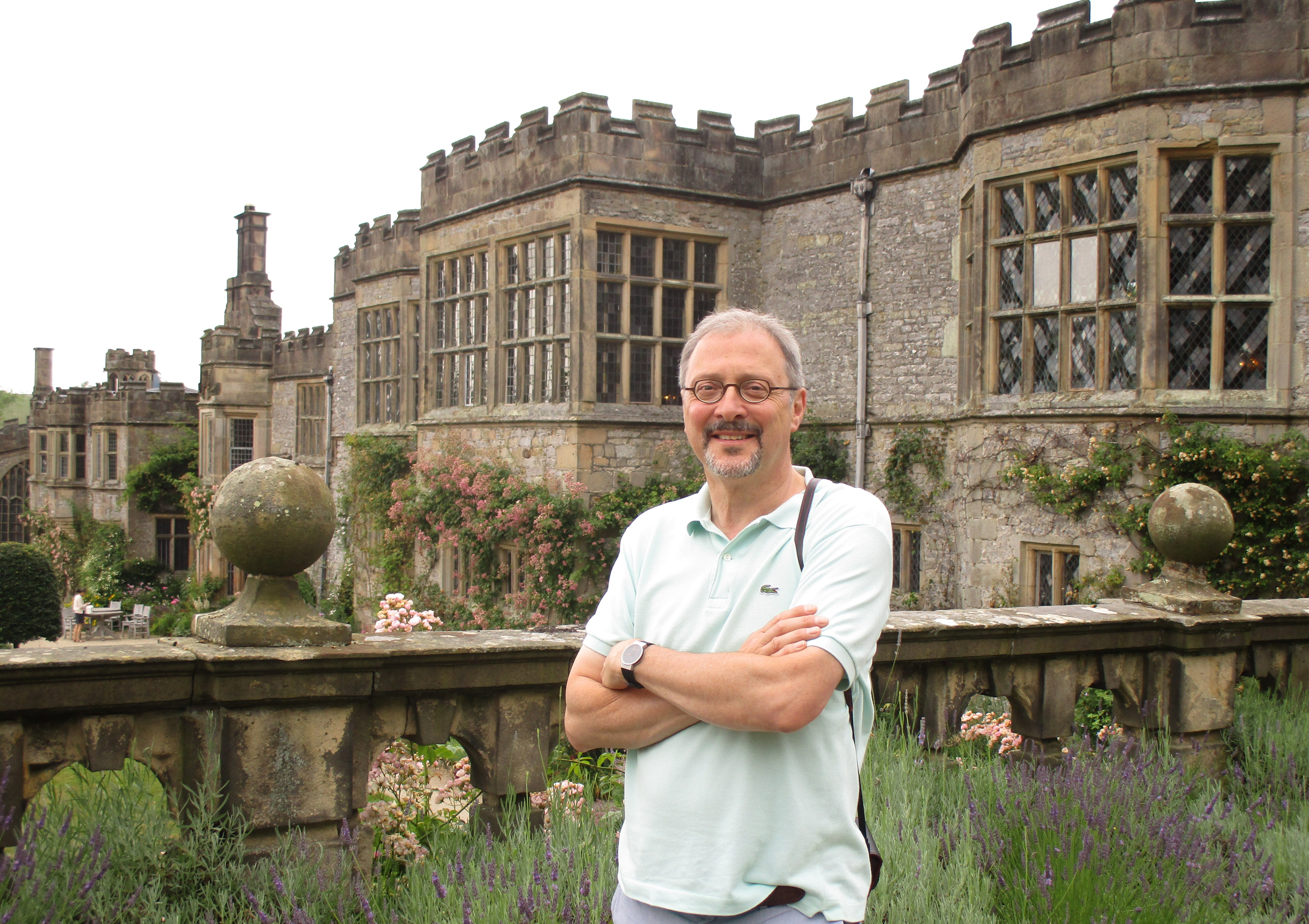
Johan van Heesch

Johan van Heesch is a Belgian numismatist specialising in the coinage and monetary history of the Roman empire. He was the Keeper of Coins and Medals at the Royal Library of Belgium, and teaches numismatics at the universities of Leuven and Louvain-la-Neuve.

== Career ==
Van Heesch (born Antwerp, 9 March 1955) has a MA in History from Ghent University, and a PhD in Archaeology from the University of Leuven (KU Leuven). In addition to teaching history, he has also pursued a career in museums, working at the Gallo-Roman Museum, Tongeren (Belgium), the Royal Museums of Art and History (Brussels) and the Brussels Coin Cabinet of the Royal Library of Belgium. He was the President of the Royal Numismatic Society of Belgium and is a director of the Revue belge de Numismatique and an editor of In Monte Artium, the journal of the Royal Library of Belgium.

== Awards ==
- 2018 awarded the Medal of the Royal Numismatic Society.
- 2016 awarded the Jeton de Vermeil of the Société française de numismatique.

== Selected publications ==
- (with Inge Heeren) Coinage in the Iron Age : essays in honour of Simone Scheers, Spink, London, 2010.
- Studies in Roman Coinage, București Editura Academiei Române Brăila Muzeul Băilei "Carol I" Brăila Editura Istros 2016
- "Quantifying Roman Imperial Coinage", in: F. de Callataÿ (ed.), Quantifying Monetary Supplies in Greco-Roman Times (Pragmateiai, 19), Bari, 2011, p. 311- 328.
- "Providing Markets with Small Change in the Early Roman Empire: Italy and Gaul", in Revue belge de Numismatique, 155, 2009, p. 125−142.
- "Les Romains et la monnaie gauloise: laisser−faire, laisser−aller ?" in: J. Metzler & D. Wigg−Wolf, Die Kelten und Rom: Neue numismatische Forschungen (Studien zu Fundmünzen der Antike, 19), Mainz am Rhein, 2005, p. 229-245.
- De muntcirculatie tijdens de Romeinse tijd in het Noordwesten van Gallia Belgica (ca. 50 v.C.−450 n.C.): de civitates van de Nerviërs en de Menapiërs (Monografie van Nationale Archeologie 11), Brussels, 1998 [1999], 352 p.
- "The last civic coinages and the religious policy of Maximinus Daza, A.D. 312", in Numismatic Chronicle, 153 (1993), p. 65−76.
