= Charles Seltman =

British historian (1886–1957)

- Born: Charles Theodore Seltman; 4 August 1886; Paddington, London, England
- Died: 28 June 1957 (aged 70); Cambridge, England
- Spouse: Isabel May Griffiths Dane (m. 1917)

Charles Theodore Seltman PhD (4 August 1886 – 28 June 1957) was an English art historian and writer particularly in the area of numismatics.

Charles Seltman was born in Paddington, London, England on 4 August 1886 to Ernest John Seltman and Barbara Smith Watson from Edinburgh, Scotland. He was educated at Berkhamsted School and during World War I served in the Suffolk Regiment in France. He married Isabel May Griffiths Dane (1893 - 1935), niece of Sir Louis Dane, on 6 June 1917 and in 1918 was accepted into Cambridge University where he specialized in archaeology. He was awarded the medal of the Royal Numismatic Society in 1945.

He is known for his theory that authoritarian societies produce abstract art while free societies produce realistic art.

He was a fellow of Queens' College, Cambridge and a University Lecturer in Classics; he was awarded an honorary degree of Doctor of Literature (Litt.D.).

His wife is buried at the Parish of the Ascension Burial Ground in Cambridge, Cambridgeshire. He died on 28 June 1957, in Cambridge, and was cremated in Cambridge Crematorium on 1 July 1957. In accordance with his wishes, his ashes were scattered in the Mediterranean Sea near Mallorca, Spain.

== Works ==
- The Temple Coins of Olympia, Greece, 1921
- Eros: In Early Attic Legend & Art, 1923
- Athens, Its History & Coinage before the Persian Invasion, 1924
- The Cambridge Ancient History, Volumes of Plates, I-V (Cambridge: University Press, 1927–1939). Vol. I, Vol. II, Vol. III, Vol. IV, Vol. V
- Attic Vase Painting Martin Classical Lectures, Volume III, 1933
- Masterpieces of Greek Coinage, 1946
- Greek Art, 1947, with Chittenden, Jacqueline
- Approach to Greek Art, 1948
- A Pictorial History of the Queens' College, Cambridge 1448–1948, with Browne, A.D, 1948
- A Book of Greek Coins, 1952
- The Twelve Olympians, Gods and Goddesses of Greece, 1952
- Greek Coins, 1955
- Women in Antiquity, 1956
- Wine in the Ancient World, 1957
- Riot in Ephesus; Writings on the Heritage of Greece, 1958
