= Proinsias Mac Cana =

Irish scholar of Celtic studies (1926–2004)

- Born: July 6, 1926; Belfast, Northern Ireland
- Died: May 21, 2004 (aged 77); Dublin, Ireland

Academic work
- Discipline: Celtic studies
- Institutions: University College Dublin; Dublin Institute for Advanced Studies

Proinsias Mac Cana (6 July 1926 – 21 May 2004) was an academic and Celtic scholar. He held professorships at the Dublin Institute for Advanced Studies and University College Dublin.

== Career ==
Proinsias Mac Cana was born in Belfast on 6 July 1926 to George McCann and his wife Mary Catherine, née Mallon; his Catholic parents were supporters of Irish nationalism. He attended Queen's University Belfast, graduating with a degree in Celtic languages in 1948. After a year at the Sorbonne, he completed a Master of Arts degree at Queen's, where he was appointed an assistant lecturer in 1951. Two years later, the university awarded him a doctorate (PhD). In 1955, he moved to the University College of Wales, Aberystwyth, as an assistant lecturer in Early Irish. In 1957, he was promoted to a lectureship. While there, he taught Old and Middle Welsh. In 1961, he was appointed Professor of Celtic Studies at the Dublin Institute for Advanced Studies and two years later became Professor of Welsh at University College Dublin where he became Professor of Early Irish in 1971. In 1985, he returned to the Dublin Institute to take up a senior professorship, and retired in 1996 afterwards being appointed to emeritus professorship. He had been President of the Royal Irish Academy between 1979 and 1982.

According to The Irish Times, Mac Cana's "main field of research was early Irish tales, and the mythology informing them, and in this field he was pre-eminent. ... He broadened and deepened the understanding of the links between the languages, cultures and traditions of the Celtic peoples of Ireland and Britain. And through his scholarship and teaching he was an interpreter of the Irish to the Welsh and of the Welsh to the Irish." Mac Cana published widely and in retirement worked to restore the Collège des Irlandais in Paris. He died on 21 May 2004.

== Honours and awards ==
Mac Cana was a member of Academia Europaea and an honorary member of the American Academy of Arts and Sciences and the Gustavus Adolphus Academy. In 1997, the British Academy awarded him its Derek Allen Prize for Celtic Studies. He was also awarded honorary doctorates by several universities, and was presented with a Festschrift: Ildánach Ildírech in 1999.

== Selected publications ==
- Celtic Mythology (Hamlyn, 1970).
- The Learned Tales of Medieval Ireland (Dublin Institute for Advanced Studies, 1980).
- Literature in Irish, Aspects of Ireland series, no. 8 (Department of Foreign Affairs, 1980).
- (Co-edited with Michel Meslin) Rencontres de Religions: Actes du Colloque du Collège des Irlandais tenu sous les Auspices de l'Académie Royale Irlandaise (Les Belles Lettres, 1986).
- (Co-edited with Jeanne-Marie Boivin) Mélusines Continentales et Insulaires: Actes du Colloque International tenu les 27 et 28 Mars 1997 à l'Université Paris XII et au Collège des Irlandais (Honoré Champion, 1999).
- Collège des Irlandais Paris and Irish Studies (Dublin Institute for Advanced Studies, 2001).
- The Cult of the Sacred Centre: Essays on Celtic Ideology (Dublin Institute for Advanced Studies, 2011).
