= Theodore V. Buttrey Jr. =

American educator, classicist, and numismatist

- Born: Theodore Vern Buttrey Jr. December 29, 1929; Havre, Montana, U.S.
- Died: January 9, 2018 (aged 88)
- Occupations: Educator, classicist and numismatist
- Awards: Medal of the Royal Numismatic Society Huntington Medal of the American Numismatic Society

Theodore Vern Buttrey Jr. (December 29, 1929 – January 9, 2018) was an American educator, classicist and numismatist. He is perhaps best known for his work discovering and exposing a scheme to distribute fake Western American gold bars.

== Personal ==
Theodore Vern Buttrey Jr. was born in Havre, Montana, on December 29, 1929, the son of Theodore V. Buttrey Sr. and Ruth Jeanette (Scoutt) Buttrey and the grandson of Frank A. Buttrey, the founder of Buttrey Food and Drug. He was educated at Peacock Military Academy, graduated from the Phillips Exeter Academy in 1946, and graduated magna cum laude with a degree in classics from Princeton University in 1950. He was awarded his Ph.D. from Princeton in 1953, and after obtaining a Fulbright Scholarship for further study in Rome, began his academic career at Yale University in 1954. Buttrey's first marriage produced four children, one of whom is Jeopardy champion Sam Buttrey, and ended in divorce; a second marriage produced no children and ended likewise. Buttrey was survived by his third wife, whom he married in October 2017.

== Career as professor ==
In 1964, Buttrey took a position in the Classics Department at the University of Michigan. He was promoted to (full) Professor in 1967, and served as chair of the department for several years. From 1969 to 1971 he was also the Director of the Kelsey Museum of Archaeology at the University of Michigan. He is remembered as part of the university's Faculty History Project which includes a statement from the university's Regents.

Buttrey had been a Visiting Fellow and Resident Member of Clare Hall, Cambridge University, in England. In 1985, after retiring from Michigan, he moved to Cambridge, where he was an Affiliated Lecturer in the Faculty of Classics. He served as Keeper of Coins and Medals at the Fitzwilliam Museum from 1988 to 1991 and from 2008 until his death held the post of Honorary Keeper of Ancient Coins.

== Contributions outside numismatics ==
Buttrey was the founder and publisher of Pevensey Press, a specialty book company principally devoted to publishing lavishly photographed books of English university towns and countryside. His company employed a photographer and several writers. More than 20 titles were produced between 1980 and 1995.

Buttrey worked with the University of Michigan Television Center from 1966 to 1980. He wrote and recorded TV shows on the Iliad (10 half-hour shows) and the Odyssey (15 half-hour shows), Herodotus, Suetonius and the Twelve Caesars, among others and in areas as diverse as race relations and on the art of drawing. These shows were carried on over 75 TV stations at their peak.

== Numismatic work ==
=== Coins of Ancient Greece and Rome ===
Buttrey spent many years active in research on coins of the ancient Mediterranean. He and his collaborators documented the coinage of Sardis, in modern-day Turkey (and formerly under the control of the Persian and Roman Empires), and, as part of a long-term Princeton University project, he also investigated the coinage at Morgantina, in modern-day Sicily. He was involved in the publication of the numismatic finds from numerous excavations in Britain, Italy (Cosa, Rome Palatine, Rome Forum), Libya (Apollonia, Cyrene, Euesperides), and Israel.

=== Coins of Mexico ===
It was as a child at the Peacock Military Academy in San Antonio, Texas that Buttrey first encountered, and became interested in, the coins of Mexico. Although as an adult his primary professional pursuits as a scholar were elsewhere, he continued his interest in Mexican coins into adulthood as well. His "Guidebook of Mexican Coins, 1822 to Date" (1969), together with subsequent editions (up to the 6th Edition in 1992, this one with first author Clyde Hubbard) is considered the seminal work on the subject.

== Fake Mexican and Western American gold bars ==
Although the bulk of Buttrey's academic output concerned coins of antiquity, Buttrey was directly involved in a controversy regarding Western American gold bars that he described as counterfeit. This followed earlier, apparently uncontroversial, work in which he was able to identify certain Mexican gold bars as counterfeit, primarily by cataloguing anachronistic assayer markings. That earlier work was capped by Buttrey's 1973 talk, "False Mexican Colonial Gold Bars" at the International Numismatic Congress. In 1984, the American Numismatic Society passed a resolution supporting Buttrey's assertions.

The dispute regarding the Western American bars was quite possibly the only time a dispute among academic numismatists reached the pages of major newspapers, including The New York Times. Buttrey's claims about the authenticity of the western bars were first detailed in a 1996 talk at the ANS. They were based in part on mint and assay markings that he said were incongruous or inconsistent. He also noted that many of the bars in question had no provenance at all, never appearing in catalogues or other materials from the time that the bars were allegedly produced through the 1950s.

Buttrey named as perpetrators of the fraud the coin dealer John J. Ford Jr., who marketed many of his creations through Stack's LLC, a New York coin dealer. Ford and Stack's maintained that all the bars in question were genuine; Ford described Buttrey as a "crackpot."

There is no question that Ford and Stack's sold a number of the disputed gold bars to collector and philanthropist Josiah K. Lilly Jr. Lilly's extensive collection of gold and coins, including the disputed bars, was donated to the Smithsonian Institution after his death in 1966 in exchange for a multimillion-dollar tax break for his estate.

In 1999, Michael Hodder, a consultant for Stack's, attempted to rebut the claims that Buttrey laid out in his 1996 ANS lecture. In August of that year, Buttrey and Hodder spoke jointly during an American Numismatic Association convention in Chicago, in an encounter referred to by numismatists as "The Great Debate". Coin World magazine wrote later that it "was one of the most heavily attended numismatic events at an ANA convention". In April 2000, Ford, together with Harvey Stack of Stack's, sued Buttrey in a $5 million action for defamation in the U.S. Federal District Court in New York. That suit was eventually dismissed. Buttrey provided evidence of what he called fraud to the office of the Attorney General of New York State, but no criminal charges were ever filed against Ford or Stack's. Although elements of the Lilly Collection continue to be on display at the Smithsonian, the gold bars in question have been removed.

== Awards ==
Buttrey was awarded the Medal of the Royal Numismatic Society in 1983 and served as its president in the years 1989–1993.

He was awarded the American Numismatic Society's Huntingdon Medal in 1996 and the medal of the Norwegian Numismatic Society in 2010. In 2009, Buttrey was made an Honorary Member of the International Numismatics Committee. He was a Corresponding Member of the Royal Danish Academy of Sciences and Letters. In 2011, the "Institut für Numismatik und Geldgeschichte" of Vienna University, Austria, awarded him the Wolfgang Hahn Medal.

== Publications ==
Buttrey's many publications include:

- Buttrey, T.V., "The Triumviral Portrait Gold of the Quattuorviri Monetales of 42 B.C." (New York: American Numismatic Society monograph 137, 1956)
- Buttrey, T.V., "Coinage of the Americas" (1972)
- Buttrey, T.V. and Moevs, M.T., "Cosa: The Coins and Italo-Megarian Ware at Cosa" (Rome: American Academy in Rome, 1980).
- Buttrey, T.V., Johnston, A., Mackenzie, K.M. & Bates, M.L., "Greek, Roman and Islamic Coins from Sardis" (Cambridge, MA: Harvard University Press, 1982)
- Buttrey, T.V., Holloway, R.R., Erim, K.T., Groves, T.D., "Morgantina Studies : The Coins, Volume II" (Princeton, NJ: Princeton University Press, 1989)
- Buttrey, T.V. (earlier editions); Hubbard, C. and Buttrey, T.V. (later editions), "Guidebook of Mexican Coins, 1822 to Date," Sixth Edition, 1992
- Buttrey, T.V., Carradice I.A., "The Roman Imperial Coinage, Vol. II, Part 1: From AD 69 to AD 96" (London: Spink, 2007)

== Obituaries ==
- Theodore V. Buttrey (1929-2018) Obituary in The E-Sylum: Volume 21, Number 2, January 14, 2018, Article 5
- In memoriam Ted Buttrey (1929-2018), by Jonathan Jarrett, 21 January 2018
