= Italian Numismatic Society =

Italian cultural association

The Italian Numismatic Society (Società numismatica italiana) is an Italian cultural association for the study of numismatics and for the promotion and spread of studies "relating to coins, tesserae, coin weights, medals and seals". Based in Milan, its members have included the most notable Italian numismatics scholars and collectors such as Serafino Ricci, one the first academics to teach the subject. Philip Grierson, Carlo Maria Cipolla, Francesco Panvini Rosati, Laura Breglia, Maria Radnoti-Alföldi and Michael Crawford have all also been members. It publishes the 'Rivista italiana di numismatica e scienze affini', the oldest Italian review on numismatics, as well as the 'Collana di numismatica e scienze affini'.

It was founded in 1892 in the post-unification intellectual climate, fulfilling a wish first expressed in the first issue of the 'Rivista italiana di numismatica' in 1888 by Solone Ambrosoli, Vergano the elder and the brothers Francesco and Ercole Gnecchi "to found an Italian Society for Numismatics like those which flourish in other nations". The Society's founder members included the future Vittorio Emanuele III, deeply interested in numismatics, who became its honorary president in 1897.
