= Eduard von Zambaur =

Austrian Orientalist (1866–1947)

- Born: 11 May 1866; Grand Duchy of Kraków
- Died: 10 October 1947 (aged 81); Graz, Allied-occupied Austria
- Notable work: The Genealogy and Chronology of Islamic History (1927)

Eduard Karl Max Ritter von Zambaur (Arabic: إدوارد فون زامباور; 11 May 1866 – 10 October 1947) was an Austrian orientalist, numismatist, and military officer. He published his magnum opus, The Genealogy and Chronology of Islamic History, in 1927. It was translated from the original French into Arabic by Zaki Muhammad Hasan with Arab League funding, and was published by King Fu'ad I University. This work is considered one of the most authoritative works of reference on Islamic dynasties.

== Life and career ==
Eduard von Zambaur was born on 11 or 12 May 1866 in Podgórze, Kraków to a lieutenant field marshal father. He began his career in the military of Austria-Hungary, attaining the rank of first lieutenant in 1890 and teaching at a military academy. He served as a representative of Austria at the Ottoman court with the rank of colonel between 1913 and 1918. He was a minor nobleman, being authorised to use the title "Ritter von" before his surname.

His academic work pertained to oriental studies and to oriental numismatics in particular. He served as vice-president and then president of the Vienna Numismatic Society. He amassed collections of rare oriental coins, but lost them several times due to circumstances out of his control, such as financial difficulties before WWI, the retreat from Constantinople, and a precarious retirement. In the latter case, his collection was purchased by the Kunsthistorisches Museum of Vienna.

Zumbaur published several papers on oriental numismatics in the Numismatische Zeitschrift, as well as two books: his seminal Genealogy and Chronology of Islamic History and Coinages of Islam, the latter having been set in type in 1942 but published posthumously. Ibn al-Athir's The Complete History and Stanley Lane-Poole's The Mohammedan Dynasties served as major sources for Genealogy and Chronology, and he improved upon Lane-Poole by including biographies of minor dynasties and non-royal rulers as well. He wrote Genealogy and Chronology at his office at the Austrian National Library. He is thought to have completed a translation of The Complete History into French, but died before it could be published, and the fate of the manuscript is unknown.

He was awarded the Huntington Medal Award by the American Numismatic Society in 1928, and the Medal of the Royal Numismatic Society in 1947.

He died on 10 October 1947 in Graz. Some reference works erroneously list his death date as 1949.

== Bibliography ==
=== Books ===
- von Zambaur, Eduard (1927). Manuel de généalogie et de chronologie pour l'histoire de l'lslam (in French). Hanover: Librairie Orientaliste Heinz Lafaire. OCLC 8082447. OL 49860434M.
- von Zambaur, Eduard (1968). Die Münzprägungen des Islams: Zeitlich und örtlich geordnet (in German). Wiesbaden: Franz Steiner Verlag. LCCN 68137898. OCLC 6321389. OL 50292204M.

=== Papers ===
- von Zambaur, Eduard (1905). "Contributions à la Numismatique Orientale. Monnaies inédites ou rares des Dynasties Musulmanes de la Collection de l'Auteur" [Contributions to Oriental Numismatics: Unpublished or Rare Coins from the Muslim Dynasties in the Author's Collection] (PDF). Numismatische Zeitschrift (in French). 36. Vienna: 43-122.
- von Zambaur, Eduard (1908). "Prägungen der Osmanen in Bosnien" [Ottoman coins in Bosnia] (PDF). Numismatische Zeitschrift (in German). 41. Vienna: 143-156.
- von Zambaur, Eduard (1914). "Nouvelles Contibutions à la Numismatique Orientale. Monnaies inédites ou rares des Dynasties Musulmanes de la Collection de l'Auteur" [New Contributions to Oriental Numismatics: Unpublished or Rare Coins from the Muslim Dynasties in the Author's Collection] (PDF). Numismatische Zeitschrift (in French). 48. Vienna: 115-190.
- von Zambaur, Eduard (1922). "Neue Khalifenmünzen" [New Caliph Coins] (PDF). Numismatische Zeitschrift (in German). 55. Vienna: 1-16.
- von Zambaur, Eduard (1926). "Review: Guide to the Exhibition of Moslem Heraldry in Palestine". Wiener Zeitschrift für die Kunde des Morgenlandes (in German). 33. Vienna: 286-288. JSTOR 23861338.
- von Zambaur, Eduard (1926). "Review: Le décor épigraphique des monument de Ghazna (Extrait de la Revue Syria 1925) S. Flury". Wiener Zeitschrift für die Kunde des Morgenlandes (in German). 33. Vienna: 288-293. JSTOR 23861339.
- von Zambaur, Eduard (1929). "Die Pflege der orientalischen Numismatik in Österreich" [The Cultivation of Oriental Numismatics in Austria]. Numismatische Zeitschrift (in German). 62. Vienna: 38-56.
- von Zambaur, Eduard (1947). "Eine neue Münzstätte der Moghulkaiser: Haidarnagar" [A New Mint of the Mughal Emperors at Haidarnagar]. Numismatische Zeitschrift (in German). 72. Vienna: 113-116.
- von Zambaur, Eduard (1947). "Ein Denkmal des indischen Aufstandes von 1857" [A Memorial to the Indian Rebellion of 1857]. Numismatische Zeitschrift (in German). 72. Vienna: 117-132.
