= Margaret E. Thompson =

American numismatist

- Born: 22 February 1911; Trenton, New Jersey, U.S.
- Died: February 29, 1992 (aged 81); Haverford, Pennsylvania, U.S.
- Education: Radcliffe College
- Known for: The New Style Silver Coinage of Athens
- Scientific career
- Fields: Archaeology; Numismatics; Education
- Institutions: American Numismatic Society; Columbia University

Margaret E. Thompson (2 February 1911 – 29 February 1992) was an American numismatist specializing in Greek coins. She was curator of the American Numismatic Society (ANS) from 1949 to 1979. She was awarded the Archer M. Huntington Medal of the American Numismatic Society in 1961 and the Medal of the Royal Numismatic Society of Great Britain in 1967.

== Biography ==
Margaret E. Thompson was born in 1911 in Trenton, New Jersey. She graduated from Radcliffe College with a BA in 1931. After graduation, she taught junior high school English for five years. In 1937, Thompson was hired as a secretary for T. Leslie Shear, the Director of Excavations at the Athenian Agora. She worked in Athens from 1937 to 1940 and from 1947 to 1949. Her responsibilities involved cleaning, organizing and documenting ancient coins found at the Agora site.

In a series of short articles, Thompson published a summary of her work at the Agora. In 1949, Sydney P. Noe, Chief Curator of American Numismatic Society (ANS), read Thompson's work and hired her as assistant curator of Greek Coins at the ANS. She was promoted to curator of Greek Coins where she served until 1976. From 1976 to 1979, Thompson was chief curator until her retirement in 1979.

In 1954, in her role as (ANS) curator, Thompson published a catalog of over 30,000 coins from the Angora expedition, coins from Roman era through the Venetian era. In 1961 Thompson published The New Style Silver Coinage of Athens for which she was awarded the American Numismatic Society's Archer M. Huntington Medal.

In 1967, the Royal Numismatic Society in London awarded Thompson a gold medal. She was elected president of the Archaeological Institute of America (AIA) from 1964 to 1968 and vice-president to the International Numismatic Commission from 1973 to 1979. In 1973, she co-authored an (ANS) publication with Otto Morkholm, An Inventory of Greek Coin Hoards.

Thompson taught summer seminars at the American Numismatic Society, graduate classes at Columbia University and was a Regents Professor at The University of California, Berkeley.

When Thompson retired from the American Numismatic Society, she was designated Chief Curator Emeritus. In 1989, the Society created an endowment in her honor, the "Margaret Thompson Curatorship of Greek Coins." Thompson died in 1992.

=== Awards and honors ===
- 1961 Archer M. Huntington Medal of the American Numismatic Society
- 1967 Medal of the Royal Numismatic Society of Great Britain
- Elected to the American Philosophical Society
- 1984 Gold Medal Award for Distinguished Archaeological Achievement

== Selected publications ==
- Thompson, Margaret (1961). The New Style Silver Coinage of Athens. Numismatic Studies. American Numismatic Society.
- Thompson, Margaret; et al. (1973). An Inventory of Greek Coin Hoards. American Numismatic Society.
- Thompson, Margaret (1991). Alexander's Drachm Mints II: Lampsacus and Abydus. Numismatic Studies. American Numismatic Society. p. 77. ISBN 978-0897222419.
