= Wilhelm Kubitschek =

Austrian art historian and archaeologist (1858–1936)

Wilhelm Kubitschek (28 June 1858, in Preßburg – 2 October 1936, in Vienna) was an Austrian classical historian, epigrapher and numismatist.

From 1875 he studied history, epigraphy and archaeology at the University of Vienna, where his teachers included Otto Hirschfeld and Otto Benndorf. Afterwards, he furthered his education in Berlin as a student of Theodor Mommsen. From 1881 he taught classes at gymnasiums in Hollabrunn and Vienna, and in 1887 qualified as a university lecturer in ancient history. In 1896 he became an associate professor at the University of Graz, and during the following year, returned to Vienna as curator of the Imperial Coin Collection at the Kunsthistorisches Museum. In Vienna, he also taught classes in Roman history, epigraphy and numismatics at the university. In 1916 he succeeded Eugen Bormann as a full professor of Roman archaeology and epigraphy.

In 1903 he was appointed conservator to the Zentralkommission für Erforschung und Erhaltung der Kunst- und historischen Denkmale (Central Commission for the Study and Preservation of Art and Historical Monuments). From 1907 to 1913 he was editor of the periodical Jahrbuch für Altertumskunde. He was the author of many articles in the Realencyclopädie der classischen Altertumswissenschaft.

He was awarded the Medal of the Royal Numismatic Society in 1923.

== Selected works ==
- De Romanarum tribuum origine ac propagatione, 1882.
- Imperium Romanum tributim discriptum, 1889.
- Rundschau über ein Quinquennium der Antiken Numismatik, 1890-1894, (1896) – Review on a quinquennial of antique numismatics.
- Heroenstatuen in Ilion, 1898 – Hero statues in Ilion.
- Kalenderstudien, 1905 – Calendar studies.
- Zur Geschichte von Städten des römischen Kaiserreiches, epigraphisch-numismatische Studien, 1916 – On the history of cities of the Roman Empire, epigraphic-numismatic studies.
- Die römerzeit, 1921 – Roman times.
