= Sigrid Blomberg =

Swedish sculptor (1863–1941)

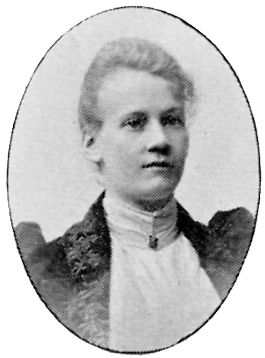
Sigrid Blomberg (1901)

Emma Emilia Sigrid Charlotte Blomberg (1863–1941) was a Swedish sculptor who focused on religious art. One of her most notable creations is Bebådelsen (The Annunciation, 1900), a marble statue depicting the Virgin Mary on her knees in prayer, her head turned upwards. It was the first sculpture by a woman to be acquired by the Swedish National Museum. After carving the wooden Madonna del Fuoco (Madonna of the Fire) in 1912, she had to abandon sculpture as a result of poor sight. Thereafter she made a living as a bookbinder.

== Biography ==
Born on 17 October 1863 in Fliseryd, Småland, Emma Emilia Sigrid Charlotte Blomberg was the daughter of the farmer Johan Alfred Blomberg (1828–1894) and Charlotta Eleonora née Lundqvist (1829–1895). Raised with her five siblings on her father's farm, she attended the Nisbeth Girls' School in Kalmar. Intending to become a carpenter, in 1888 she attended the Technical School in Stockholm. Suddenly discovering the possibilities of sculpting with clay, she went on to study at the Royal Swedish Academy of Art from 1889 to 1898, following Axel Tallberg's etching course (1895–1896). During this period, she spent three years studying in Germany, mainly in Dresden. In 1894, she was awarded the Academy's Hertigliga Medal for her sculpture Ormtjuserskan (Snake Charmer), subsequently purchased by Västerås Castle.

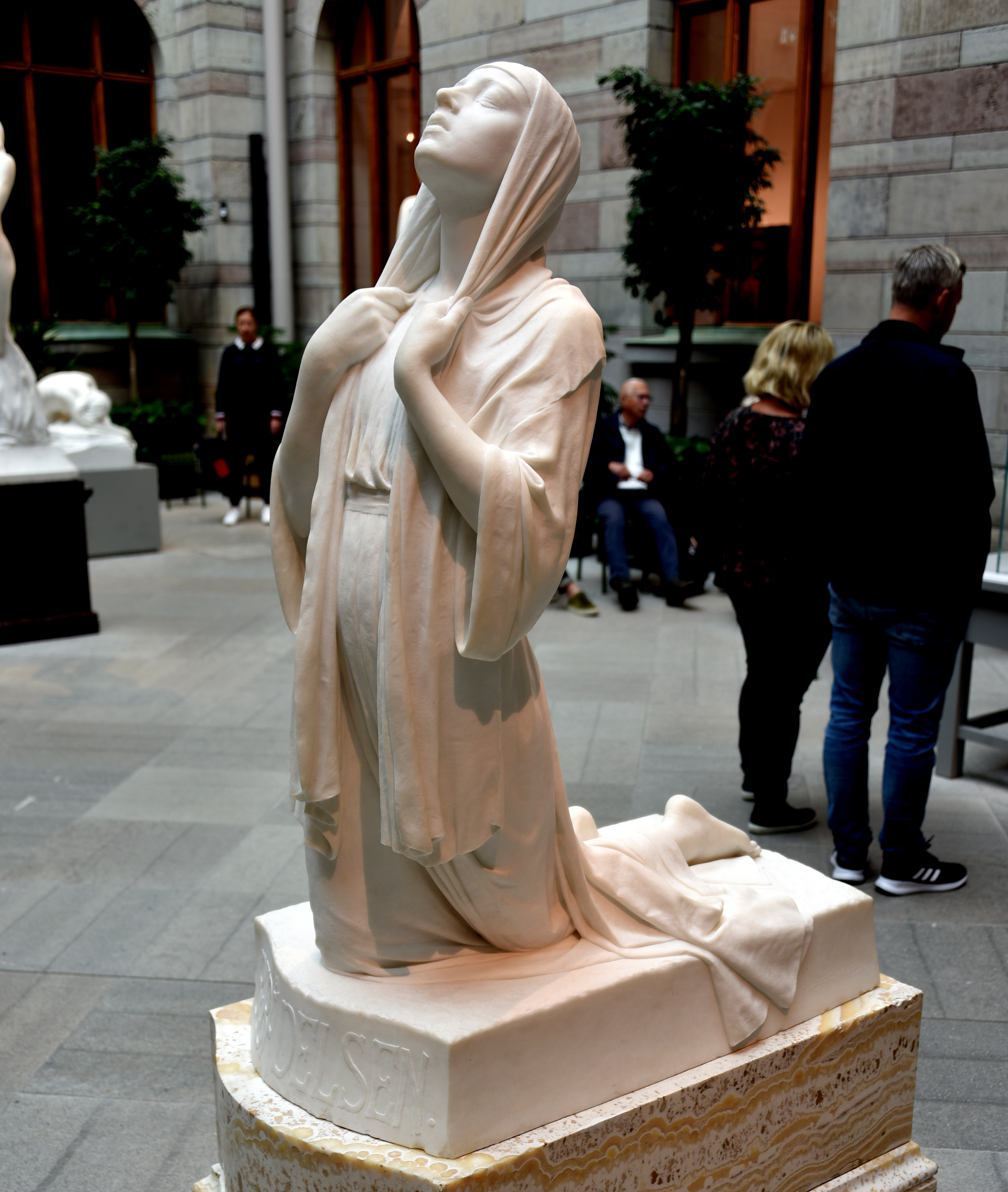
The Annunciation (1900)

From 1896, she was awarded various scholarships which allowed her to continue her studies. During her final year at the Academy, she was awarded the Royal Medal for her figurines Kristus and Maria (Christ and Mary), part of a series of five she was creating for Oskarshamn Church (completed in 1899). In 1898, she used plaster to create a model for her most famous piece, Bebådelsen, which was initially displayed at the Academy. The final version in marble was created in Italy under Blomberg's supervision and was acquired by the National Museum in 1900. Depicting the Virgin Mary kneeling in prayer, it was greatly appreciated by visitors to the museum and was later mass-produced in terracotta miniatures which became popular in Swedish homes.

In 1900 she joined Nya Idun, a women's association. It was there she met Sigrid Leijonhufvud, whom she lived with. Thanks to the many commissions Blomberg received for producing religious works, she was able to maintain a studio in Italy between 1900 and 1912. She was commissioned to produce funerary monuments for the Östra Cemetery in Gothenburg and a sarcophagus for Viktor Rydberg's monument. In 1912, she created her last work, the wooden Madonna del Fuoco (Madonna of the Fire) inspired by the flames in her fireplace. Thereafter she earned her living as a bookbinder.

Sigrid Blomberg died in Karlstad on 28 January 1941.
