= Sydney P. Noe =

American numismatist

Sydney Philip Noe
- Born: 4 April 1885; Woodbridge, New Jersey, USA
- Died: June 4, 1969 (aged 84); New Brunswick, New Jersey, U.S.
- Education: Rutgers University

Sydney Philip Noe (April 4, 1885 – June 4, 1969) was an American numismatist, specializing in Greek coins, and was librarian, then curator, of the American Numismatic Society (ANS). He was awarded the ANS's Archer M. Huntington Medal (1938), and the Medal of the Royal Numismatic Society (1949).

== Biography ==
Noe was born on April 4, 1885, in Woodbridge Township, New Jersey. He graduated from Rutgers University with a master's degree in 1913, having majored in engineering. While working part-time in the library he was asked to classify a donation of coins, and thus began a lifelong interest in numismatics.

== Career at the American Numismatic Society ==
Noe was librarian at the ANS from 1915 to 1938, when he succeed Howland Wood as curator. In 1947 he was named Chief Curator, and in 1953 (when he retired) he was named Chief Curator Emeritus. Noe also served as Secretary for the ANS (1917–1947), and as Editor (1921–1945), during which time the ANS launched two series: Numismatic Notes and Monographs, and Numismatic Studies. He was named a Life Fellow of the ANS in 1919, and a patron in 1968. In 1965 the ANS Council presented him with a gold medal to commemorate his 50 years of service to the Society. After retirement, he continued to go to the ANS.

== Publications ==
- Coin Hoards (Numismatic Notes and Monographs 1)
- A Bibliography of Greek Coins (Numismatic Notes and Monographs 78) (1937)
- The Pine Tree Coinages of Massachusetts (Numismatic Notes and Monographs 125 (1952)
- Coinage of Caulonia (Numismatic Studies 9) (1958)
