= Shah Umair =

Indian numismatist, historian and social media influencer

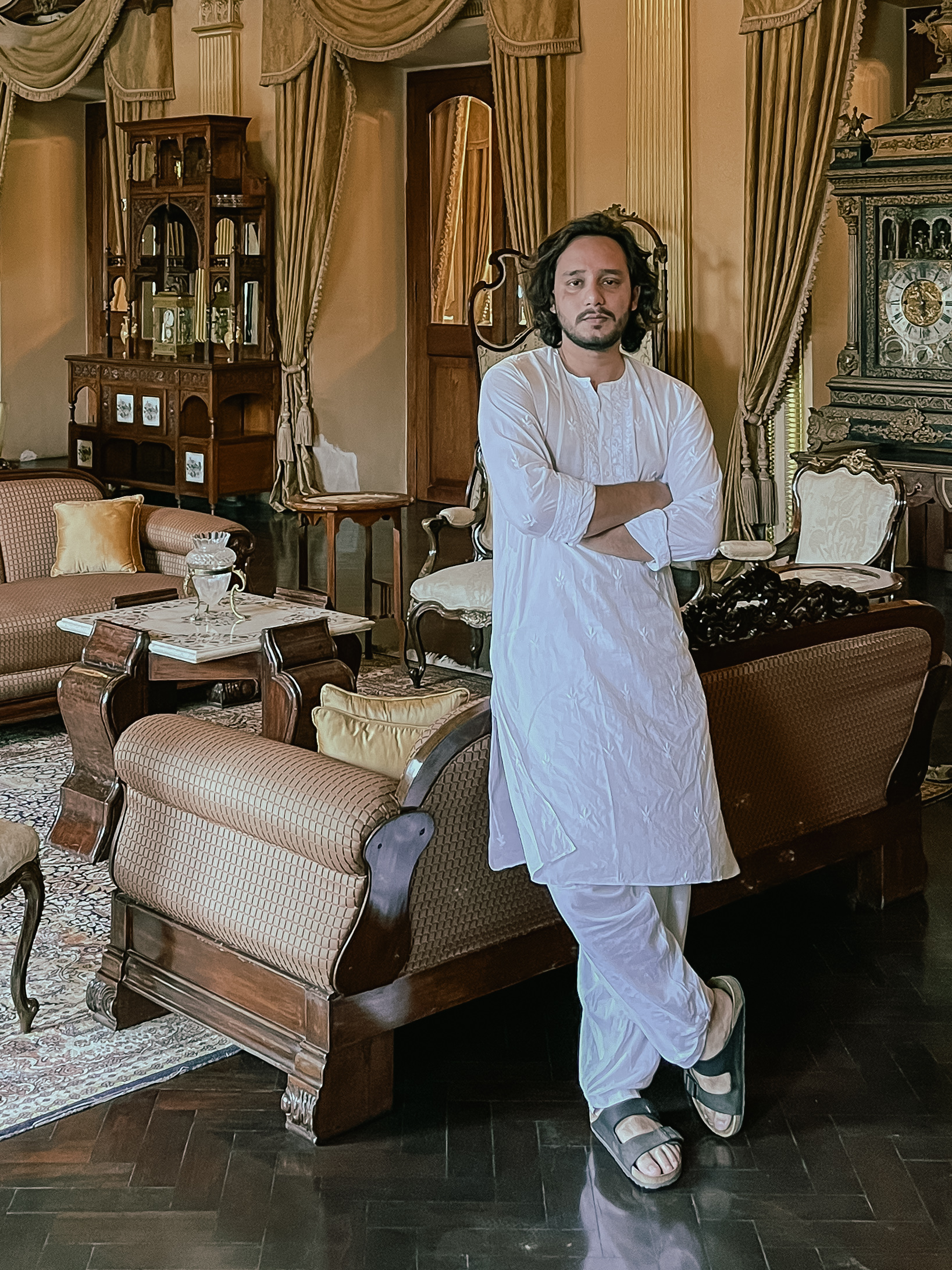
- Umair in 2023
- Born: India
- Other name: Sikkawala
- Occupations: Numismatist, historian, social media influencer

Shah Umair is an Indian numismatist, amateur historian and social media influencer.

== Life and career ==
Umair, originally trained as a fashion consultant and from Eastern India, moved to Delhi to start Noon Social, a digital marketing and creative studio for fashion brands.

Umair leads heritage walks around Delhi. His aim is to popularize lesser-known monuments of the city.

Umair is also an Instagram influencer (under the moniker Sikkawala), and he uses the social media platform to chronicle his research of Delhi's history and advocate for heritage preservation.
