= Paul Balog (numismatist) =

Italian numismatist, archaeologist (1900–1982)

- Born: 1900; Budapest, Austria-Hungary
- Died: November 6, 1982 (aged 81–82); Rome, Italy
- Awards: Medal of the Royal Numismatic Society (1968)
- Scientific career
- Fields: Islamic numismatics

Paul Balog (Hungarian: Balog Pál; 1900 – 6 November 1982) was a Hungarian-born Italian numismatist, archaeologist and physician. He specialized in Islamic numismatics.
