= Dorothea Menadier =

German medievalist and numismatist

- Born: 11 December 1891
- Died: 24 March 1944 (aged 52); Berlin
- Cause of death: Aerial bombing
- Occupations: Numismatist; medievalist

Academic background
- Education: Friedrich-Wilhelms-Universitat
- Thesis: Die Münzen und das Münzwesen der deutschen Reichsäbtissinnen im Mittelalter (1915)
- Doctoral advisor: Michael Tangl

Dorothea Menadier (11 December 1891 – 24 March 1944) was a German medievalist and numismatist, who studied the coinage of women's monastic houses.

== Biography ==
Menadier was born on 11 December 1891. She was the daughter of the medieval numismatist and director of the Berlin Coin Cabinet Julius Menadier (de) and Ida, née Freiin von Düring. After attending the Chamissoschule in Berlin-Schöneberg, she studied history at the universities of Tübingen and Berlin. In Berlin, she graduated with a PhD on 21 June 1915. Her thesis was supervised by Michael Tangl. Menadier analysed the coins and coinage of medieval German nunneries and abbesses, a topic that had been suggested by her father.

Menadier's research demonstrated that most of the mints known from the coinage are also known from documentary sources. She also demonstrated that bailiffs were connected to the coinage.

In 1932 she contributed to a women's guidebook to Berlin, entitled Was die Frau von Berlin wissen muß ... : Ein praktisches Frauenbuch für Einheimische und Fremde. She died on 24 March 1944 at the age of 52 when an aerial bomb hit her house in Berlin-Lichterfelde. She was unmarried.

== Selected works ==
- Die Münzen und das Münzwesen der deutschen Reichsäbtissinnen im Mittelalter (Friedrich-Wilhelms-Universitat zu Berlin., 1915).
