= Brita Malmer =

Swedish numismatist

- Born: 1 June 1925; Malmö, Sweden
- Died: 8 May 2013 (aged 87); Stockholm, Sweden

Academic background
- Education: Lund University
- Thesis: Nordiska mynt före år 1000

Academic work
- Discipline: numismatics
- Institutions: Stockholm University
- Main interests: Viking Age

Brita Ingrid Maria Malmer (1 June 1925 – 8 May 2013), was a Swedish numismatist who specialized in the Viking Age. She was Sweden's first professor of numismatics.

== Biography ==
Malmer was born in Malmö, where her father, Svante Alenstam, was a schoolteacher. Having graduated from high school in 1945, she studied history, archaeology, classical studies, art history and pedagogy at Lund University, and earned her bachelor's degree 1949. She received her licentiate degree in 1953 and her PhD in 1966 with a dissertation on the oldest Hedeby coins, Nordiska mynt före år 1000.

In 1959, Malmer moved to Stockholm, where she took employment at the Royal Coin Cabinet. She was equally committed to exhibitions and research, especially the project Corpus nummorum saeculorum IX-XI qui in Suecia reperti sunt, a catalog of all Viking Age coins found in Sweden, which she led for twenty years. Initially employed part-time, Malmer got a full-time position in 1962 and was promoted to manager of the Royal Coin Cabinet in 1971. She held the post until 1979, when she was appointed Gunnar Ekström Professor of Numismatics and Money History. She retired in 1992.

In 1972, Malmer delivered the Dorothea Coke Memorial Lecture for the Viking Society for Northern Research on King Canute's Coinage in the Northern Countries.

Malmer was elected member of the Royal Swedish Academy of Letters, History and Antiquities in 1981 and the Norwegian Academy of Science and Letters in 1986; honorary fellow of the Royal Numismatic Society in 1998. She also served as chairperson of several foundations and associations, including the Sven Svensson Foundation for Numismatics 1971–1979 and 1988–1993, the Swedish Archaeological Society 1974–1976, the Swedish Numismatic Society 1974–1976, and the Gunnar Ekström Foundation for Numismatic Research 1974–1979. She received several awards for her work, including the Medal of the Royal Numismatic Society in 1986.

She was married to the professor of archeology Mats P. Malmer; their daughter, Elin Malmer, is a historian. Brita and Mats Malmer are both buried at Lidingö Cemetery.
