= Sigrid Leijonhufvud =

Swedish author, historian, and feminist

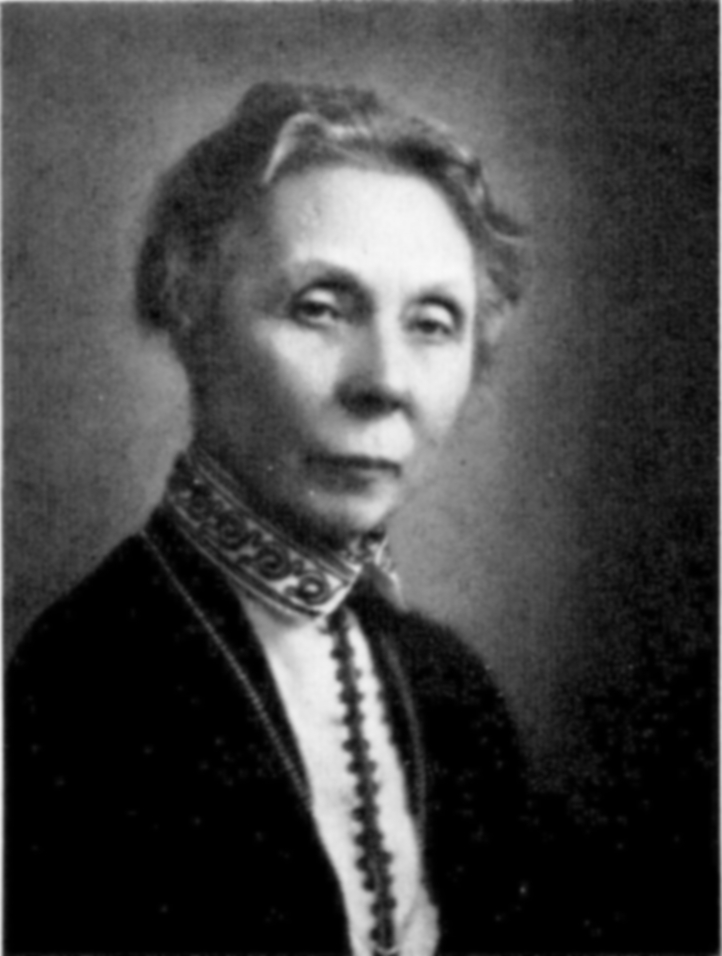
- Sigrid Leijonhufvud
- Born: Sigrid Amalia Leijonhufvud; 5 July 1862; Stockholm, Sweden
- Died: 14 November 1937 (aged 75); Stockholm, Sweden
- Education: Uppsala University
- Occupations: Writer; historian
- Father: Axel Leijonhufvud
- Relatives: Sophie Adlersparre (aunt)

Sigrid Amalia Leijonhufvud (5 July 1862 – 14 November 1937) was a Swedish author, historian, and feminist, who is best known for authoring biographies of historical women. She was granted membership in the Samfundet De Nio (The Nine Society) and was awarded the Swedish royal medal Litteris et Artibus in recognition of her writing career.

== Early life ==
Sigrid Leijonhufvud was born on 5 July 1862 in Stockholm, Sweden. Born into an aristocratic family, she was one of the nine children to Countess Ebba Ulrika Sparre and Count Axel Hjalmar Leijonhufvud. Her father also served as a colonel and royal chamberlain. As many other children of the upper class, she was educated privately at home. In 1883, she received her school-leaving certificate at the Lyceum Girls' School in Stockholm.

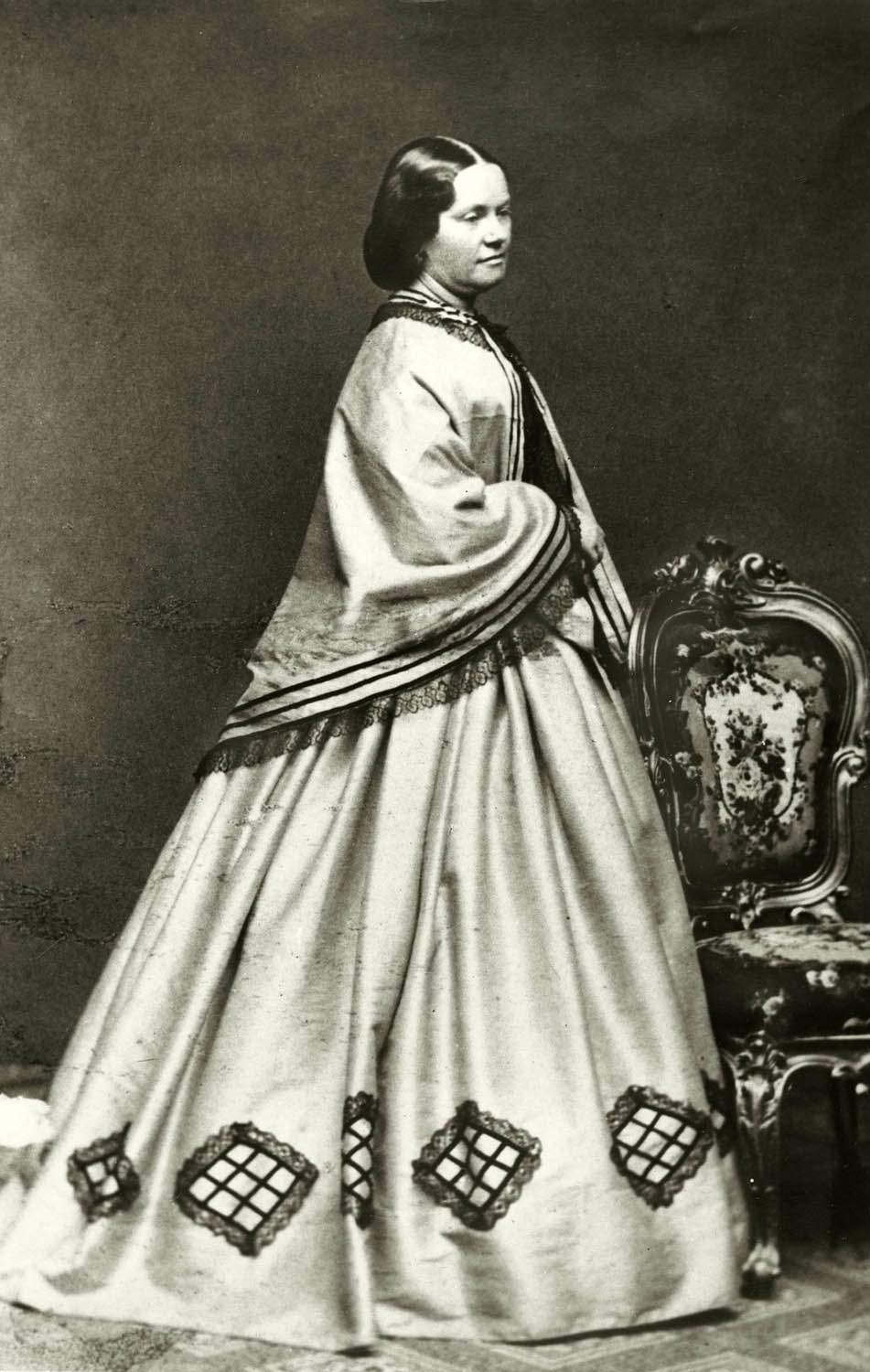
Sophie Adlersparre (1823–1895), women's rights activist, exposed Leijonhufvud to women's movement.

Her father did not want Leijonhufvud to continue education. Her aunt, Sophie Adlersparre (née Leijonhufvud) (1823–1895), was a leading women's rights activist and founder of the Fredrika Bremer Association. Through her, Leijonhufvud was introduced to her contemporaneous women's movement and she developed an interest in women's history. In 1925, she received a degree in languages, art-history, and literature from the Uppsala University. She began working as a teacher at the Åhlin school in 1892, and from 1901, she was employed as a librarian at the Royal Swedish Academy of Letters, History and Antiquities (KVHAA).

== Career ==
As an author and researcher, Leijonhufvud was an admirer of her aunt, and sought to write biographies of women belonging to the period 1600–1800. In 1896, Leijonhufvud published her first work, a biography of feminist reformer Fredrika Bremer (1801–1865). With the help her maternal grandfather, Gustaf Adolf Sparre, who was a medievalist, and inspired by historian Ellen Fries, Leijonhufvud continued to research old manuscripts. Her second publication, Ur svenska herrgårdsarkiv (1902) explored the Carolingian Empire and the period of liberty. In 1908, she published a biography of writer Agneta Horn. Leijonhufvud aunt's letters to Victoria Benedictsson were published in the form of a book two years later. Between 1922 and 1923, she a biography on her aunt, which chronicles the long-established social stratification, as well as the rapid socio-political developments of the 1800s. Between 1917 and 1933, her research focused on the life and works of Swedish politician Carl Gustaf Tessin. She also began contributing literary reviews, short articles, and notes on archival discoveries to academic journals, such as Fornvännen, Fataburen, Karolinska förbundets årsskrift, and Personhistorisk tidskrift.

Leijonhufvud maintained a large social circle. She was friends with children's writer and illustrator Ottilia Adelborg, historian and suffragette Lydia Wahlström, sculptor Sigrid Blomberg. She served as a member of the Fredrika-Bremer-Förbundet board, often contributing her own articles to the association's journal, Dagny. She was also an active member of the Nya Idun Society that was founded in 1885. Under the auspices of the society, she worked towards publishing works on the roles of working women. In 1911, she also co-wrote the lines for the introductory cantata at the World Congress for Women's Suffrage with the composer Elfrida Andrée.

== Later years and recognition ==
Leijonhufvud work on Tessin received recognition for portraying the socio-cultural situation of the 1700s, and she became a popular figure in Sweden. In 1918, she was elected into the Swedish literary society Samfundet De Nio (The Nine Society or Society of the Nine). In 1922, she was honoured with the Swedish royal medal Litteris et Artibus for services to literature and history. In 1937, she was awarded an honorary doctorate degree from Lund University.

Leijonhufvud died in Stockholm, on 14 November 1937.
