= Cécile Morrisson =

French historian and numismatist

- Born: 16 June 1940 (age 86); Dinan, France
- Education: École normale supérieure (Paris) (ENS-Ulm)
- Occupations: Historian and numismatist

Cécile Morrisson (born 16 June 1940) is a French historian and numismatist. She is Director of Research emeritus at the French National Center for Scientific Research and specializes in the study of the Byzantine Empire.

== Biography ==
Cécile Morrisson was born on 16 June 1940 in Dinan, France. She studied at the École normale supérieure, earned her Agrégation in history and obtained her doctorate in history at École normale supérieure (Paris) (ENS-Ulm).

She was director of the department of coins, medals and antiquities of the Bibliothèque nationale de France. She is Emeritus Research Director at the CNRS and Advisor for Byzantine Numismatics at Dumbarton Oaks, Washington, D.C.

== Distinctions ==
- Knight of the Legion of Honour
- Knight of the National Order of Merit
- Knight of the Academic Palms

Morrisson is a member of the Académie des Inscriptions et Belles-Lettres since December 11, 2015. She was awarded the Medal of the Royal Numismatic Society in 1994, and the British Academy's Derek Allen Prize for numismatics in 1999.

== Publications ==
- Cécile Morrisson, Les Croisades, Paris : PUF, 1969
- Cécile Morrisson, Catalogue des monnaies byzantines de la Bibliothèque nationale, Paris, 1970
  - book 1 : D'Anastase Ier à Justinien II (491-711)
  - book 2 : De Philippicus à Alexis III (711-1204)
- Cécile Morrisson and Tommaso Bertelè, Numismatique byzantine suivie de deux éludes inédites sur les monnaies des Paléoloques, Wetteren, 1978
- Roger Guéry, Cécile Morrisson and Hédi Slim, Recherches archéologiques franco-tunisiennes à Rougga, Rome, 1982
  - book 3 : Le trésor de monnaies d'or byzantines
- Cécile Morrisson, Claude Brenot, Jean-Noël Barrandon, Jean-Pierre Callu, J. Poirier and Robert J. Halleux, L'Or monnayé, book 1 : Purification et altérations de Rome à Byzance, Paris, 1985
- Catherine Abadie-Reynal, Vassiliki Kravari, Jacques Lefort and Cécile Morrisson, Hommes et richesses dans l'Empire byzantin, vol. 1-2, Paris, 1989-1991
- Jean-Claude Cheynet, Cécile Morrisson and Werner Seibt, Sceaux byzantins de la collection Henri Seyrig, Paris, 1991
- Cécile Morrisson, La numismatique, Paris, 1992
- Cécile Morrisson, Monnaie et finances à Byzance, Aldershot: Variorum, 1994. ISBN 0-86078-401-0
- Cécile Morrisson and Bernd Kluge, A Survey of Numismatic Research 1990-1995, Berlin, 1997
- Cécile Morrisson, Les Échanges au Moyen Âge: Justinien, Mahomet, Charlemagne; trois empires dans l'économie médiévale, Dijon, 2000
- Denis Feissel, Cécile Morrisson et Jean-Claude Cheynet, Trois donations byzantines au Cabinet des Médailles : Froehner (1925); Schlumberger (1929); Zacos (1998), Paris, 2001 (exposition organised on the occasion of the XXe Congrès International des Etudes Byzantines à Paris, 16 July - 14 October 2001)
- Cécile Morrisson, Le Monde byzantin, book 1 : L'Empire romain d'Orient: 330-641, Paris : PUF, 2004 ISBN 2-13-052006-5
- Jacques Lefort, Cécile Morrisson and Jean-Pierre Sodini, Les Villages dans l'Empire byzantin, IVe-XVe siècle, Paris, 2005
- Cécile Morrisson, Vladislav Popovic and Vujadin Ivaniševic, Les Trésor monétaires byzantins des Balkans et d'Asie Mineure (491-713), Paris, 2006
- Angeliki E. Laiou and Cécile Morrisson, The Byzantine Economy, Cambridge, 2007. ISBN 978-0-521-84978-4
- Cécile Morrisson (and John William Nesbitt,Catalogue of Byzantine seals at Dumbarton Oaks and in the Fogg Museum of Art . 6: Emperors, patriarchs of Constantinople, addenda, Washington, DC, 2009
- Angeliki E. Laiou and Cécile Morrisson, Le monde byzantin. Byzance et ses voisins 1204 - 1453, book 3: L'empire grec et ses voisins, XIIIe - XVe siècle, Paris, 2011
- Cécile Morrisson, Trade and Markets in Byzantium, Washington, DC, 2012
- Cécile Morrisson, Byzance et sa monnaie (IVe - XVe siècle). Précis de numismatique byzantine, suivi du catalogue de la collection Lampart, Paris, 2015
- Cécile Morrisson and Georg-D. Schaaf, Byzance et sa monnaie: IVe-XVe siècle: précis de numismatique byzantine, Paris, 2015
