= Herbert Cahn =

Swiss numismatist

Herbert Adolf Cahn (28 January 1915, Frankfurt am Main – 5 April 2002, Basel) was a classical archaeologist, numismatist, coin-dealer and antiquities-dealer. He was awarded the medal of the Royal Numismatic Society in 1971. Born in Germany, he became a Swiss citizen in 1949.

== External sources ==
- Literature by and about Herbert Cahn at the Deutsche National Bibliotek (in German)
