= Economy Museum – Royal Coin Cabinet =

Coordinates: 59°19′34″N 18°04′22″E

- Ekonomiska museet – Kungliga Myntkabinettet
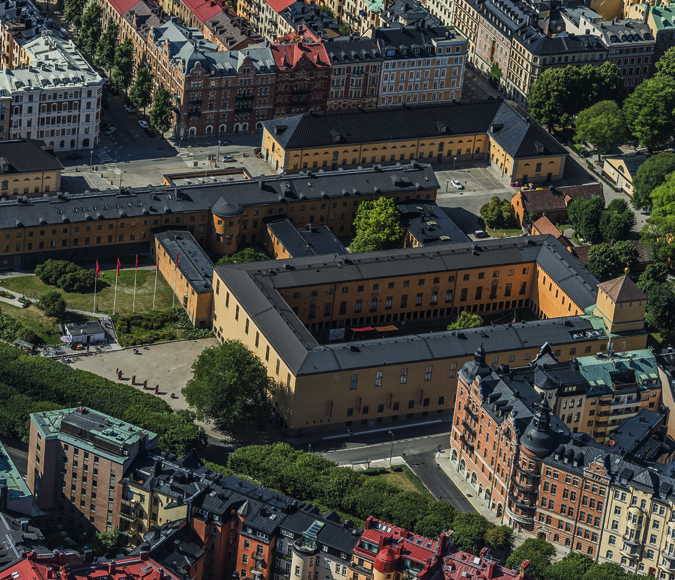

- Location within Stockholm
- Former name: Royal Coin Cabinet – The National Museum of Coin, Medal and Monetary History
- Established: 1786
- Type: Economic and numismatic museum
- Website: ekonomiskamuseet.se/en/

The Economy Museum – Royal Coin Cabinet (Swedish: Ekonomiska museet – Kungliga Myntkabinettet) is a museum in central Stockholm, Sweden, dedicated to the history of money and economic history.

== Function ==
The Economy Museum is an institution with a national responsibility for the conservation and the historical studies of coins, medals, and finance in general. Through expositions, the institution offers insights in the economical history of the world; by lending objects from its collection to researchers and expositions all over the world, it helps develop the knowledge within its scope; and by maintaining a national register of coin hoards, it is of great importance to scholars in Sweden.

When the museum moved to Slottsbacken 6 in 1996, the artwork Vattenporfyrlek by Elisabeth Ekstrand, made of marble and porphyry, was installed outside the building. The exhibitions at Slottsbacken closed in 2017, and the museum moved to its present location at Narvavägen in 2019.

The museum's permanent exhibitions include coins, banknotes and other objects relating to the history of money and economics. Among the objects on display are Viking Age silver treasures, Sweden's first coins and one of the first banknotes issued in Europe by Stockholms Banco.

== History ==
The Economy Museum's collection dates back to around 1572 when Rasmus Ludvigsson began collecting old Swedish coins. Over the next few centuries, the royal collection grew with donations from royals.

In 1786, the Royal Academy of Letters was established and took ownership of the collection. In 1846, the collection was exhibited publicly for this first time at the Ridderstolp House at Skeppsbron. In 1865, the Royal Coin Cabinet collections was moved into the National Historical Museum. The collection was exhibited there until it moved to another building in Östermalm between 1938 and 1948. From 1899 to 1929, numismatist Rosa Norström expanded the collections.

In 1996, the museum was moved to Slottsbacken in Stockholm's Old Town. It changed its name from "Royal Coin Cabinet – The National Museum of Coin, Medal and Monetary History" to "Royal Coin Cabinet – National Museum of Economy." In 2017, the museum closed and, in 2019, reopened in the Swedish History Museum's building.

== Theft ==
In 2013, the museum discovered that it was missing items from its collections. After launching a police investigation and taking inventory, they found that 1,200 objects with a reported value of 25 million SEK were missing. The museum's last audit had been conducted in 1997 when the museum moved to its location in Old Town.

In 2017, a former curator of the museum was sentenced to three years in prison for stealing and selling items from the Royal Coin Cabinet and Museum of Gothenburg. In 2020, another former employee was acquitted for the possession of stolen coins. The man had sold about 200 coins but prosecutors could not prove that they were stolen from the museum. The ruling was upheld on appeal because the prosecutors could not prove the acts were not statute barred. 11 items were confiscated during the 2017 indictment and returned to the museum.

== Collection ==
The museum's collection is one of the oldest museum collections in Sweden, with its origins dating to around 1572. It comprises approximately 650,000 objects, including about 450,000 coins from around the world, as well as banknotes, medals, stock certificates and other objects relating to economics and trade.

Notable objects in the collection include:

- Sweden's first coin, struck during the reign of Olof Skötkonung around 995.
- A 10-daler copper plate coin from 1644, during the reign of Christina, Queen of Sweden, weighing 19.7 kg (43 lb) and described by the museum as the world's largest coin.
- Examples of Sweden's first banknotes, issued by Stockholms Banco, Sweden's first bank.
- The Lohe treasure, a hoard of coins and other valuables discovered in Gamla stan in Stockholm.
- Stock certificates from the Swedish East India Company.
- The Nobel Prize medal awarded to Swedish chemist and physicist Svante Arrhenius in 1903, when he became the first Swedish Nobel laureate.
- A Bitcoin ATM, preserved as an example of more recent forms of monetary exchange.

== See also ==
- List of museums in Stockholm
- Swedish History Museum
