= Professional Numismatists Guild =

Coin-collecting organization

The Professional Numismatists Guild is a non-profit organization dedicated to coin collecting, as well as the buying and selling on coins and paper money.

== History ==
Founded in 1955, the organization is composed of many of the top coin and paper money dealers in the United States.
