= Numismatic Literary Guild =

Non-profit numismatic organization

The Numismatic Literary Guild is a non-profit numismatic organization composed of editors, authors, journalists, bloggers, designers, and multimedia producers who report on all aspects of coins, tokens, medals, paper money and other exonumia.

== History ==
Founded in 1968, the organization held its first meeting at the annual American Numismatic Association's World's Fair of Money in San Diego with a goal of assisting numismatic writers with research and photography.

They hold an awards presentation at their annual meetings.

== Bibliography ==
- Alexander, D. T. (1999). A 25-Year History: 1968-1993. Numismatic Literary Guild.
