= Francesco Gnecchi =

Francesco Gnecchi Ruscone
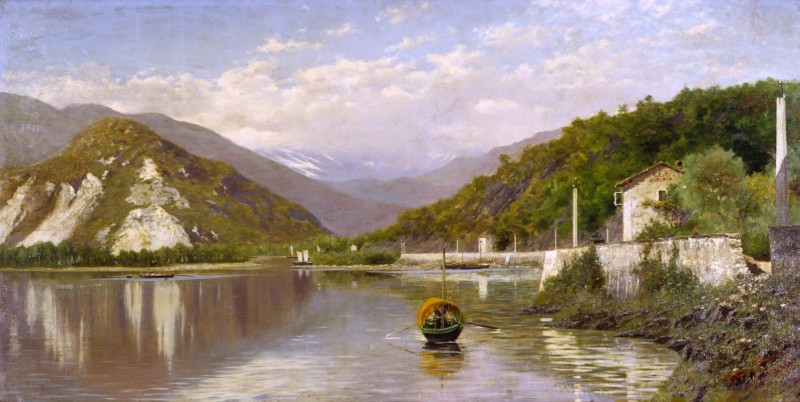
- Riviera (Lago Maggiore) o Il Sempione dal Lago Maggiore, 1884 (Fondazione Cariplo)
- Born: 1847; Milan
- Died: 1919 (aged 71–72); Rome
- Occupation: Painter

Francesco Gnecchi Ruscone (8 September 1847 in Milan – 15 June 1919 in Rome) was an Italian painter and numismatist.

Born into a wealthy family in the silk trade, the artist initially studied law at the University of Pavia before enlisting as a volunteer in the war against Austria in 1866. He combined painting with the family business until 1878 and continued to sit on the board of directors of major companies in Lombardy even afterwards. A pupil of Mosè Bianchi and Achille Formis, he focused primarily on landscape and drew upon the contemporary work of the school of Lombard Naturalism. His large output of landscapes – mostly featuring Lake Maggiore, the coast of Liguria and the Engadin – reveals a cultured artist abreast of the latest developments. Constant participation in the major Milanese and national exhibitions from 1881 to 1891 also suggests the image of a professional painter. He was also the father of verismo opera composer Vittorio Gnecchi.

Friendship with Luigi Scrosati fostered an interest in flower painting alongside the passion for collecting Roman coins that began in 1870 and saw the publication of a number of short works written together with his brother Ercole on the classification of his collection. This comprised some 20,000 items on his death in 1919 and was purchased by the state in 1923 for the Museo Nazionale Romano. The brothers also founded the 'Rivista italiana di numismatica' in 1888 and the Italian Numismatic Society in 1892. Gnecchi's work on numismatics was highly regarded internationally, gaining him the medal of the Royal Numismatic Society in 1906.

== Published works ==
- (with Ercole Gnecchi) Le monete di Milano da Carlo Magno a Vittorio Emanuele II, 1884
- Guida numismatica universale, 1886
- Saggio di bibliografia numismatica delle zecche italiane medioevali e moderne, 1889
- Monete romane, 1896 (English ed.: Roman Coins, 1903)
- Medaglioni romani, 1912.
