= Maria Radnoti-Alföldi =

Hungarian-German archaeologist (1926–2022)

- Born: Maria Alföldi; 6 June 1926; Budapest, Hungary
- Died: 7 May 2022 (aged 95)
- Occupations: Archaeologist; Numismatist

Academic work
- Discipline: Roman Archaeology; Numismatics
- Institutions: Hungarian National Museum; Deutsche Forschungsgemeinschaft; Akademie der Wissenschaften und der Literatur; Goethe University Frankfurt

Maria Radnoti-Alföldi (6 June 1926 – 7 May 2022) was a Hungarian-German archaeologist and numismatist specialising in the Roman period. She is known for her research into the analysis of the distribution of coin finds, Roman history, and the self-depiction of the Roman emperors.

== Early life and education ==
Radnoti-Alföldi was born in 1926 in Budapest to Geza Alföldi and his wife Olga Alföldi. She completed high school in 1944 and then enrolled in the philosophy department at the Loránd Eötvös University in Budapest where she studied until 1949.

== Career ==
In 1947, Radnoti-Alföld started work at the Hungarian National Museum and married the archaeologist Aladár Radnóti, and in 1950 held a winter-term lectureship in the winter-term at Loránd Eötvös University. She was forced to leave this work in 1957 when after the suppression of the Hungarian Revolution of 1956, Radnoti-Alföldi and her husband fled via Vienna to Bavaria. Radnoti-Alföld then became a researcher on the Fundmünzen der Römischen Zeit in Deutschland ('Roman-period Coin Finds in Germany') project of the Deutsche Forschungsgemeinschaft from 1957 to 1962. In the summer of 1961, she received her Habilitation at LMU Munich in the then-new subject of ancient numismatics. In 1962, she moved with her husband to Frankfurt, where he received a professorship at Goethe University Frankfurt focused on ancient medicine and Roman provincial history and culture.

In December 1972, Aladár Radnóti died and Maria was appointed to the same professorship at Goethe as he had held. She taught from then until her retirement in 1991 in the 'Seminar for Greek and Roman History, Second Section' on Roman provincial archaeology and ancient medicine. Since her retirement in 1991, she has been an emerita professor at Goethe University Frankfurt.

She led the Griechisches Münzwerk project of the Berlin-Brandenburg Academy of Sciences and Humanities and the Fundmünzen der Antike ('Coin finds from Antiquity') project of the Akademie der Wissenschaften und der Literatur (with Hans-Markus von Kaenel), for which she has produced several volumes.

== Awards and memberships ==
Radnoti-Alföldi was awarded the Cross of Merit on the Order of Merit of the Federal Republic of Germany in 1992.

For her work on ancient numismatics, she was awarded the medal of the Royal Numismatic Society in 1995, and the Archer M. Huntington Medal of the American Numismatic Society in 2000.

She was a member of the Akademie der Wissenschaften und der Literatur and an ordinary member of the German Archaeological Institute.

Radnoti-Alföldi was also an honorary member of several learned societies: the Italian Numismatic Society, the Österreichische Numismatische Gesellschaft, the Société française de numismatique, the Commission Internationale de Numismatique, the Hungarian Numismatic Society, and of the Hungarian Society for the Studies of Antiquity.

== Select publications ==
- 1963. Die Constantinische Goldprägung. Untersuchungen zu ihrer Bedeutung für Kaiserpolitik und Hofkunst (The Constantinian gold coinage. Investigations on their significance for imperial politics and court art). Philipp von Zabern, Mainz. ISBN 3-515-02402-6.
- 1976. Dekadrachmon. Ein forschungsgeschichtliches Phänomen (Decadrachm: A scholarly historical phenomenon). Franz Steiner Verlag, Wiesbaden. ISBN 3-515-02402-6.
- 1978. Antike Numismatik. Teil 1: Theorie und Praxis (Ancient numismatics. Part 1: Theory and Practice). Philipp von Zabern, Mainz. ISBN 3-8053-0230-4
- 1978. Antike Numismatik. Teil 2: Bibliographie (Ancient numismatics. Part 2: Bibliography). Philipp von Zabern, Mainz. ISBN 3-8053-0335-1.
- 1999. Bild und Bildersprache der römischen Kaiser. Beispiele und Analysen (Imagery and visual language of the Roman Emperors. Examples and analysis). Philipp von Zabern, Mainz. ISBN 3-8053-2455-3.
- 2004. Phoenix aus der Asche. Die Liburna, ein Gründungsmonument von Constantinopolis (Phoenix from the ashes. The Liburna, a foundation monument of Constantinople). Franz Steiner Verlag, Stuttgart. ISBN 3-515-08612-9.
- 2011 (with Edilberto Formigli and Johannes Fried). Die römische Wölfin. Ein antikes Monument stürzt (The Roman she-wolf. An ancient monument overthrown). Franz Steiner Verlag, Stuttgart. ISBN 978-3-51509876-2.
- Die Fundmünzen der römischen Zeit in Deutschland (FMRD) IV 3/1-2; 3/4-6. Gebruder Mann Verlag, Trier.

== Bibliography ==
- Hans-Christoph Noeske et al. (ed.): Die Münze. Bild - Botschaft - Bedeutung. Festschrift für Maria R. Alföldi. Peter Lang, Frankfurt am Main 1991. ISBN 3-631-42640-2 (with full list of publications).
