= Michel Amandry =

French numismatist

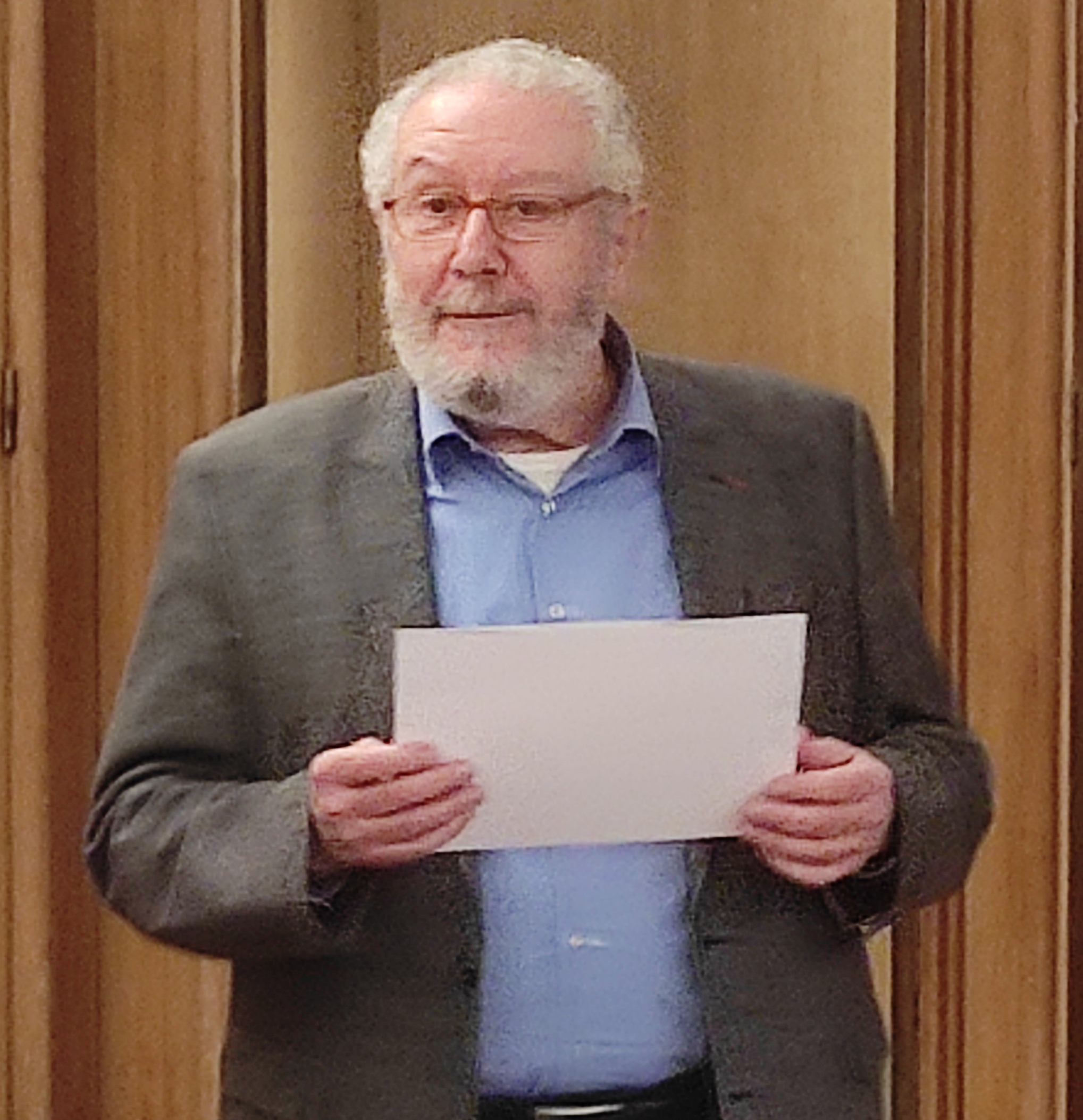
Michel Amandry in 2024

Michel Amandry (born in 1949) is a French numismatist.

== Career ==
Michel Amandry, the son of the archaeologist Pierre Amandry, studied in Strasbourg and Paris, where in 1979 he received his doctorate at the Sorbonne. From 1991 to September 2013 he was director of the Cabinet des Médailles, the Department of Coins, Medals and Antiquities of the Bibliothèque nationale de France. He also teaches numismatics as 'directeur d'études' in the École pratique des hautes études in Paris.

His research focus is the numismatics of the Roman Empire.

Michel Amandry is a corresponding member of the Austrian Academy of Sciences and of the German Archaeological Institute. as well as a member of numerous national numismatic societies. He was awarded the Huntington Medal Award and the Medal of the Royal Numismatic Society in 2004.

From 2003 to 2009, he was President of the International Numismatic Council/ Conseil international de numismatique. Furthermore, he has been involved in the publication of numerous numismatic writings since 2003. He was publisher and co-editor of the biennial Survey of Numismatic Research and editor and co-author of the Dictionnaire de numismatique published in 2001.

== Selected publications ==
- 1978: Trésor trouvé en Macédoine, monnaies impériales grecques,
- 1981: Le Monnayage de Dymé (Colonia Dumaeorum) en Achaïe, corpus,
- 1983: Le Monnayage augustéen de Leptis Minor : Byzacène,
- 1988: Le Monnayage des duovirs corinthiens, (thesis)
- 1990: Anatolie antique : fouilles françaises en Turquie
- 1991: with Andrew Burnett and others: Roman Provincial Coinage vol. 1,
- 1993: Coinage production and monetary circulation in Roman Cyprus,
- 1994: The romanization of Hellenistic coinages in the Mediterranean East,
- 1999: avec Andrew Burnett and others: Roman provincial coinage vol. 2,
- 2001: Dictionnaire de numismatique,
- 2003: A survey of numismatic research : 1996 - 2001,
- 2009: A survey of numismatic research : 2002 - 2007,
- 2009: Trésors de la Gaule et de l'Afrique du Nord au IVe siècle de notre ère (= Trésors monétaires vol. 23).
