= International Association of Professional Numismatists =

International association of professional numismatic firms

- Abbreviation: IAPN
- Formation: 1951
- Founded at: Geneva, Switzerland
- Type: Non profit professional association
- Headquarters: Zug, Switzerland
- Region served: International
- Members: Numismatic firms, not individuals
- Key people: Daniel Frank Sedwick, President; Executive Committee, 12 to 15 members
- Website: www.iapn-coins.org

The International Association of Professional Numismatists (IAPN) is a non-profit organization of international numismatic firms founded in 1951. Its stated objectives are the development of a healthy and prosperous numismatic trade conducted according to high standards of business ethics and commercial practice, the encouragement of scientific research, and the promotion of numismatics globally.

== History ==
The IAPN was constituted at a meeting held in Geneva, Switzerland, in 1951, to which leading international numismatic firms had been invited. The association was established with 28 founding members.

== Membership ==
Membership is restricted to numismatic firms or numismatic departments of other commercial institutions, rather than individual collectors. The association has over 110 member firms located across five continents and 21 countries. The General Assembly serves as the supreme governing body of the association and is convened annually, typically in a different country each year.

== Governance ==
The Executive Committee is composed of twelve to fifteen persons from at least six countries and includes the President, two Vice Presidents, the General Secretary and the Treasurer. There are subcommittees dealing with membership, discipline, publications, anti forgery work and government relations.

== Activities ==
In pursuit of the objective to encourage numismatic research the association has published or assisted in the publication of a number of important numismatic works. It maintains a close liaison with the International Numismatic Commission, and individual members take an active interest in the work of their national numismatic organisations.

In 1965 the IAPN held an international congress in Paris to consider the study of and defence against counterfeit coins, and in 1975 the association established the International Bureau for the Suppression of Counterfeit Coins. This bureau maintains close links with mints, police forces, museums and collectors with the publication of specialised reports on counterfeits. Since January 1997 information about new dangerous counterfeits and scanned photos of the pieces has been available on the Internet. The Bulletin of Counterfeits and Internet access are restricted to members only.

Members of the IAPN guarantee the authenticity of all the coins and medals which they sell, which is a condition of membership. Collectors may purchase numismatic material from any of the firms from the membership list in the knowledge that if any item proves to be counterfeit or not as described, the piece can be returned and the purchase price will be refunded regardless of the date of purchase.

Membership of the association is not lightly acquired. Applicants must be sponsored by three members and the vetting of applications involves a rigorous and sometimes protracted procedure. Applicants must have been established in business as numismatists for at least four years and must be known to a number of members. The committee must be satisfied that applicants have carried on their business in an honourable manner and that they have sound general knowledge of numismatics as well as expertise in their speciality.

== Medal of Honour ==
The Medal of Honour of the association was established in 1963 in memory of its first president, Leonard S. Forrer. It is awarded by the President to persons of distinction whom the association wishes to honour or for distinguished services to the association.

== The IAPN Book Prize ==
The IAPN Book Prize was established in 1982 to encourage the publication of books of scientific and general interest. It is an annual prize for a numismatic work published the previous year.

Recipients of the IAPN Book Prize

- 1982, M. J. Price, Coins, 650 BC to the Present Day
- 1983, David R. Sear, Greek Imperial Coins
- 1984, E. R. Duncan Ellis, The Anglo Gallic Coins
- 1985, D. M. Metcalf, Coinage of the Crusades and the Latin East
- 1986, D. Eustache, Corpus des Monnaies Alawites
- 1987, Philip Grierson and Mark Blackburn, Medieval European Coinage I
- 1988, Romolo Calciati, Corpus Nummorum Siculorum I to III
- 1989, D. R. Cooper, The Art and Craft of Coin Making
- 1990, R. D. Van Arsdell, Celtic Coinage of Britain ISBN 9780907605249
- 1991, G. K. Jenkins and M. Castro Hipolito, Catalogue of the Gulbenkian Collection, Part II
- 1992, Dennis Gill, The Coinage of Ethiopia, Eritrea and Italian Somalia ISBN 978 0962750304
- 1993, Robert Friedberg, Gold Coins of the World
- 1994, M. C. Caccamp Caltabiano, La Monetazione di Messana
- 1995, Stephen Scher, The Currency of Fame
- 1996, U. Klein and A. Raff, Die Wurttembergischen Medaillen von 1496 bis 1797
- 1997, Sabine Bourgey, Tresor, Legendes et Realites
- 1998, Jonathan Williams ed., Money, A History ISBN 0 7141 0885 5
- 1999, Piero Voltolina, La Storia di Venezia attraverso le medaglie
- 2000, David L. Vagi, Coinage and History of the Roman Empire
- 2001, Mikhail E. Diakov, Russian Coins of Peter the Great
- 2002, H. E. Manville, Tokens of the Industrial Revolution
- 2003, Houghton and Lorber, Seleucid Coins
- 2004, Christian E. Dekesel, Bibliography of the 17th Century Numismatic Books
- 2005, S. Cudazzo, Monete Italiane Regionali
- 2006, M. Mehl, Die Munzen des Stiftes Quedlinburg
- 2007, J. Vico Monteolivia et al., Corpus Nummorum Visigothorum
- 2008, Richard McAlee, The Coins of Roman Antioch
- 2009, Silvia Mani Hurter, Die Didrachmenpragung von Segesta
- 2010, Helmut Zottl, Salzburg, Munzen und Medaillen 1500 bis 1800
- 2011, Christopher Eimer, British Commemorative Medals and Their Values
- 2012, Hector Carlos Janson, La Moneda Circulante en el Territorio Argentino
- 2013, Krisadaolarn and Mihailovs, Siamese Coins
- 2014, Italo Vecchi, Italian Cast Coinage
- 2015, Carlo and Silvana Crippa, Le Monete di Milano
- 2016, Hugo Vanhoudt, De munten van de Nederlanden ISBN 978 90 902 8784 3
- 2017, Andreas Pangerl, Portraits, 500 Years of Roman Coin Portraits
- 2018, Paul Stevens, The Coins of the English East India Company
- 2019, Catherine Lorber, Coins of the Ptolemaic Empire
- 2020, Roberto Delzanno, Sveriges Guldmynt 1512 to 2020 ISBN 9789163994661
- 2021, Roberto Delzanno, Sveriges Myntbok 995 to 2022 ISBN 9789163994685
- 2022, Steve Hill, The Gold Sovereign Series
- 2023, Prashant P. Kulkarni, Archaic Coinage of the Godavari Valley
- 2024, Jerome Mairat, Roman Imperial Coinage V.4 ISBN 978 19 1266 799 4

== Publications ==
The IAPN publishes the Survey of Numismatic Literature in its Special Publications series.

Special Publications

- 1, Gunther Probst, Die Munzen Salzburgs
- 2, First International Congress on Coin Forgeries, Analytical Report
- 3, Rodolfo Spahr, Siciliane dai Bizantini a Carlo I d Angio
- 4, Proceedings of the 8th International Congress of Numismatics
- 5, Survey of Numismatic Research 1972 to 1977
- 6, Rodolfo Spahr, Le Monete Siciliane
- 7, Proceedings of the 9th International Congress
- 8, Numismatics, Witness to History
- 9, Survey of Numismatic Research 1978 to 1984
- 10, Philip Kinns, The Caprara Forgeries
- 11, Proceedings of the 10th International Congress of Numismatics
- 12, Survey of Numismatic Research 1985 to 1990
- 13, Survey of Numismatic Research 1990 to 1995
- 14, Survey of Numismatic Research 1996 to 2001
- 15, Survey of Numismatic Research 2002 to 2007
- 16, Survey of Numismatic Research 2008 to 2014

== See also ==
- International Numismatic Congress
- Numismatic associations
- List of numismatics awards
