= Shimonoseki City University =

- 下関市立大学
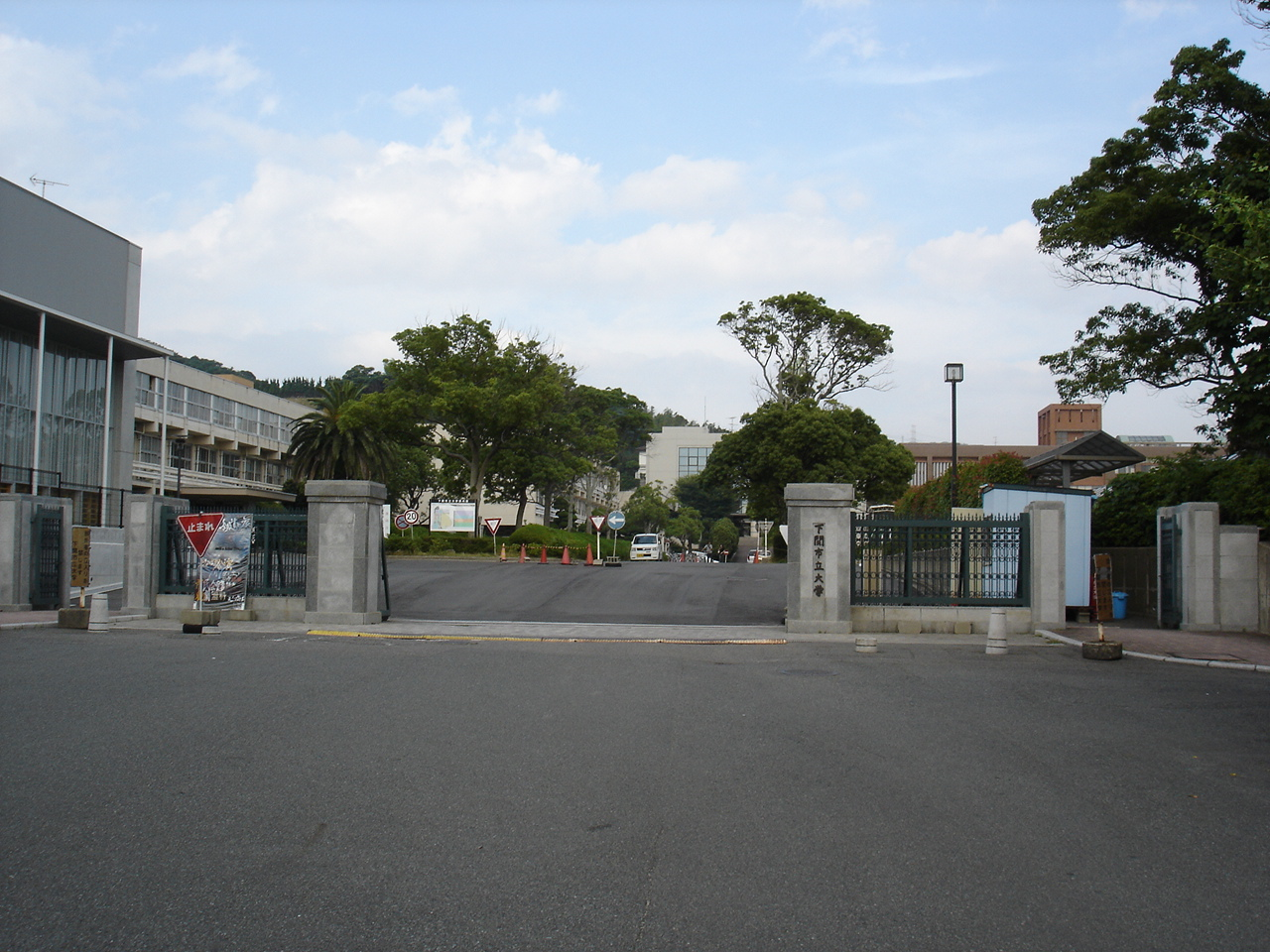
- Type: Public
- Established: Founded 1956; Chartered 1962
- President: Yoichi Kawanami
- Faculty: 51 full-time
- Students: 2,076
- Undergraduates: 2,058
- Postgraduates: 18
- Location: Shimonoseki, Yamaguchi, Japan; 33°59′16″N 130°56′05″E
- Campus: Urban
- Website: www.shimonoseki-cu.ac.jp

Shimonoseki City University (下関市立大学, Shimonoseki shiritsu daigaku) is a municipal university in Japan. Its campus is located in Daigaku-cho, Shimonoseki City, Yamaguchi Prefecture.

== History ==
It was founded in 1956 as Shimonoseki Commercial Junior College (下関商業短期大学, Shimonoseki shōgyō tanki daigaku) for the working youths who eagerly wanted to get higher education. In 1962 the college was developed into Shimonoseki City University (SCU).

SCU had at first only one department: the Department of Economics (the Faculty of Economics). The departments have been added as follows:

- 1983: Department of International Commerce
- 1990: Shimonoseki Institute for Research of Industry and Culture
- 2000: Graduate School (Master's courses)
- 2011: Department of Public Management

== Undergraduate Schools ==
- Faculty of Economics
  - Department of Economics
  - Department of International Commerce
  - Department of Public Management

== Graduate Schools ==
- Department of Socio-economic Systems (Master's course only)
- Department of International Business Communication (Master's course only)

== Institutes ==
- Shimonoseki Institute for Research of Industry and Culture
- Institute for Collaborative Community Development
- International Exchange Center
- University Library
- Whale Library and Museum
- Pufferfish Library and Museum
