= Vera Hatz =

German numismatist

- Born: Vera Jammer; 15 August 1923; Hamburg
- Died: 18 October 2010 (aged 87); Eutin
- Occupation: Numismatist
- Spouse: Gert Hatz
- Awards: Royal Numismatic Society Medal; Gunnar Holst Medal

Academic background
- Education: University of Hamburg
- Thesis: Die Anfänge der Münzprägung im Herzogtum Sachsen (10. und 11. Jahrhundert) (1952)

Vera Hatz (1923–2010) was a German numismatist, who specialised in medieval European coinage, in particular that of the tenth and eleventh centuries in northern Europe. She was jointly awarded the Royal Numismatic Society Medal, as well as the Gunnar Holst Medal.

== Biography ==
Born Vera Jammer on 15 August 1923 in Hamburg, she was awarded her PhD from the University of Hamburg. Entitled "Die Anfänge der Münzprägung im Herzogtum Sachsen. (10. und 11. Jahrhundert)", it was supervised by Walter Hävernick (de) and published in 1952. By 1951 she had begun work in the numismatic department at the Museum for Hamburg History. In 1954 Hatz became part of an international collaborative project 'Corpus Nummorum Saeculorum IX-XI qui in Suecia Reperti Sunt' alongside Peter Berghaus, Michael Dolley, Ulla S. Linder-Welin and Brita Malmer. A further collaborator was her husband Gert Hatz. She was also known for her work on the Otto-Adelheid coinage.

In 1988 the festschrift Commentationes numismaticae 1988: Festgabe für Gert und Vera Hatz was published. The volume recognised the important contributions both made to numismatics, and in particular coinage of the Viking world.

In 2013 a medal was designed by Peter-Götz Güttler, posthumously commemorating Hatz's 90th birthday.

== Awards ==
- Royal Numismatic Society Medal - 2003 (with Gert Hatz)
- Gunnar Holst Medal - 2007 (with Gert Hatz)
