= Carmen Arnold Biucchi =

Swiss numismatist (1947–2026)

- Born: 23 June 1947; Lugano, Switzerland
- Died: 2 January 2026 (aged 78); Cambridge, Massachusetts, U.S.
- Education: University of Fribourg
- Occupation: Damarete Curator of Ancient Coins
- Employer: Harvard Art Museums
- Organization: International Numismatic Council
- Known for: Classical numismatist and archaeologist

Carmen Francesca Ernesta Arnold-Biucchi (23 June 1947 – 2 January 2026) was a Swiss classical numismatist and archaeologist. She was an expert on the coinages of Greek Sicily and Hellenistic numismatics.

Arnold-Biucchi worked at the American Numismatic Society from 1982 to 2002, before becoming the Damarete curator of ancient coins at the Harvard Art Museums in 2002. She retired in 2019.

== Early life and education ==
Born in Lugano, Switzerland on 23 June 1947, she studied classical archaeology and ancient history at the University of Fribourg, Switzerland, receiving her Magister in 1971. She completed her dissertation on Cypriot terracottas in 1976.

== Academic career ==
Arnold-Biucchi worked as a numismatic research associate from 1974–1977 at the Lexicon Iconographicum Mythologiae Classicae in Basel and later at the Lexicon's US Center at Rutgers University. In 1982, she moved to the American Numismatic Society (ANS) as the Greek and Roman curatorial assistant. She was assistant curator of ancient coins at the ANS from 1984 to 1989. In 1989, she became the first Margaret Thompson curator of Greek coins. While working at the ANS, Arnold-Biucchi taught the graduate summer seminar (1982–1999).

She worked as an adjunct Professor at Columbia University (1995), Bryn Mawr (2000), and CUNY (2001), Visiting Professor at the Università degli Studi di Padova, Italy (1993), and at the EPHE of the Sorbonne in Paris (2007). In 2001–2002, she was the J. Clawson Mills Art History Fellow at the Metropolitan Museum of Art. In 2004, she was the Robinson Visiting Scholar at the Ashmolean Museum and Kraay Fellow at Wolfson College, Oxford.

In 2002, Carmen Arnold Biucchi became the Damarete curator of ancient coins at the Harvard Art Museums. She was located in the Department of Ancient & Byzantine Art & Numismatics, and was also a Lecturer in Classics. While curator, Arnold-Biucchi organized, digitized, cataloged and promoted the numismatic collection.

In 2003 Arnold-Biucchi became the secretary of the International Numismatic Council, serving as president between 2009 and 2015.

== Death ==
Biucchi died in Cambridge, Massachusetts on 2 January 2026, at the age of 78.

== Awards ==
- 2012: Gunnar Holst Numismatic Foundation Medal
- 2014: Jeton de Vermeil of the French Numismatic Society
- 2022: Medal of the Royal Numismatic Society UK

== Books ==
- (1990) The Randazzo Hoard and Sicilian Chronology in the Early Fifth Century BC. New York.
- (2006) Alexander's Coins and Alexander's Image. Boston.
- (2014) (with M. Beckmann) (eds). Sculpture and Coins: Margaret Bieber as Scholar and Collector. Loeb Classical Monographs.

== Other publications ==
- (1988) (with L. Beer-Tobey and N.M. Waggoner) 'A Greek archaic silver hoard from Silenus', American Numismatic Society Museum Notes 33, 1–35.
- (1991) 'Arabian Alexanders', in W.E. Metcalf (ed.), Mnemata: Papers in Memory of Nancy M. Waggoner, New York, 99–115.
- (1992) 'A new coin of the Serdaioi (?) at the ANS', in M. Price, A. Burnett and R. Bland (eds), Essays in Honour of Robert Carson and Kenneth Jenkins, London, 1–3.
- (2002) 'Some remarks on the coinages of South Italy and Etruria and those of Cyprus in the archaic and classical period', Numismatica e antiche classiche 31, 45–67.
- (2007) (with A.-Peter Weiss) 'The river god Alpheios on the first tetradrachm issued of Gelon at Syracuse', Numismatica e antiche classiche 36, 59–74.
- (2008) 'Syracusan Dekadrachms revisited', Numismatische Zeitschrift 116/117, 13–28
