= Bimaran casket =

Buddhist reliquary in Afghanistan

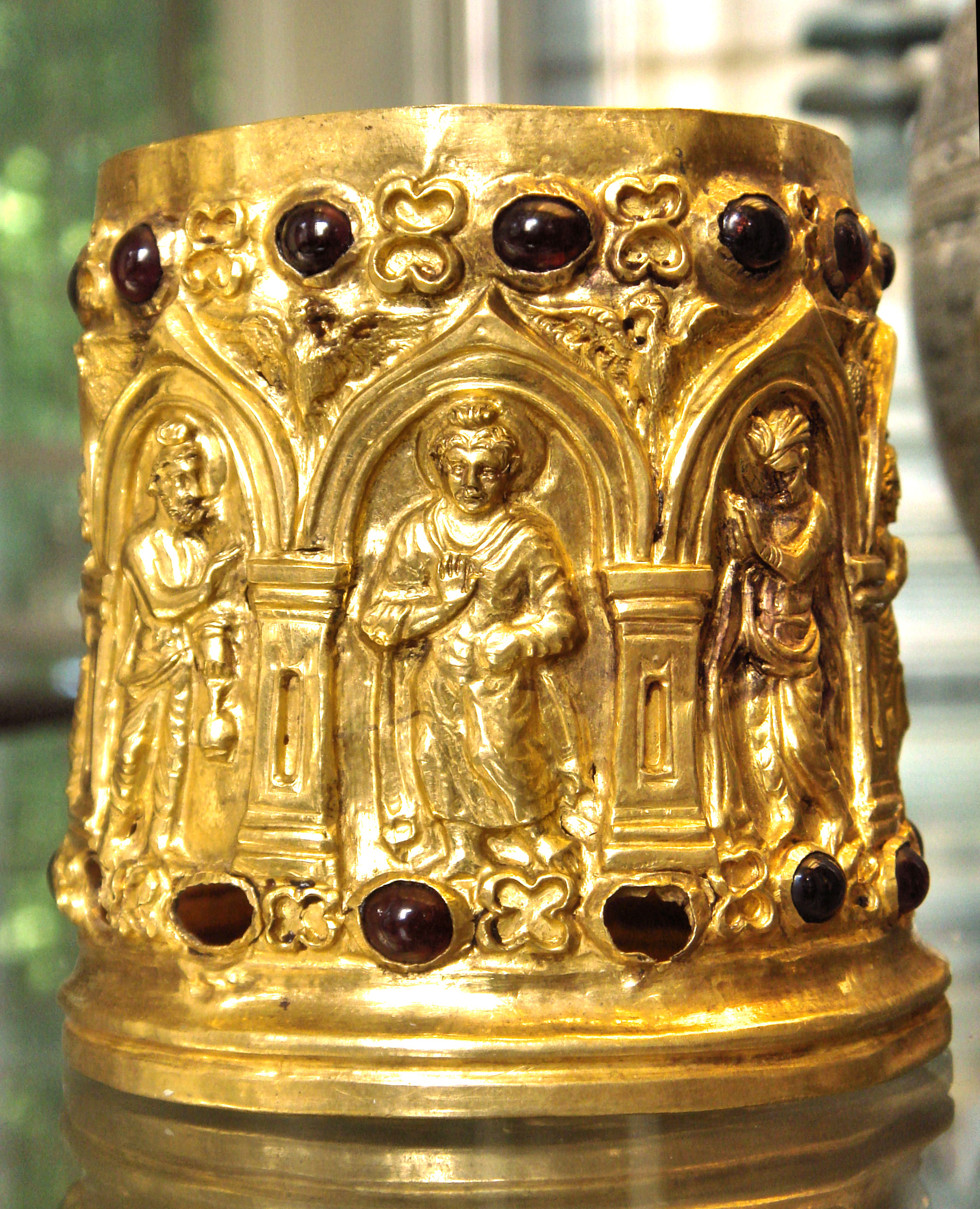
- The Bimaran casket or reliquary on display in the British Museum, with a depiction of the Buddha, surrounded by Brahma (left) and Śakra (right).
- Material: Gold encrusted with gems
- Size: 6.7 cm (2.6 in) cm high, 6.6 cm (2.6 in) diameter
- Created: 1st century CE
- Discovered: Bimaran; 34.458544°N 70.349792°E
- Present location: British Museum, London
- Registration: OA 1900.2-9.1

Location
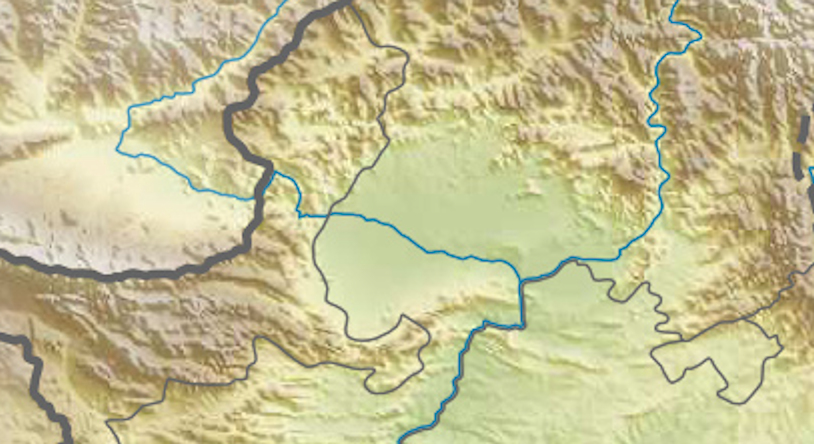

The Bimaran casket or Bimaran reliquary is a small gold reliquary for Buddhist relics that was removed from inside Stupa No. 2 at Bimaran, near Jalalabad in eastern Afghanistan. The coins within are of Indo-Scythian origin. They were originally attributed to the reign of Azes II, and later reassigned to the reign of Azes I. More recent research indicates that they were probably minted by the kings Kharahostes and Mujatria, who minted posthumous issues in the name of Azes.The reliquary is typically dated to the 1st century CE based on the artistic style, though some sources instead date it to the 2nd century.

== Discovery ==
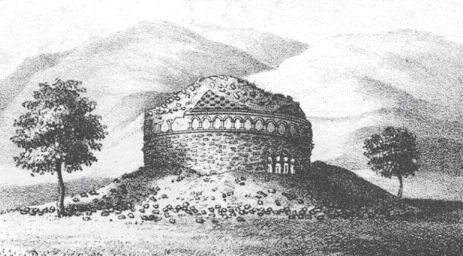
The Stupa Nb.2 at Bimaran, where the reliquary was excavated. Drawing by Charles Masson.

When it was found by the archaeologist Charles Masson during his work in Afghanistan between 1833 and 1838, the casket contained coins of the Indo-Scythian king Azes II, though recent research by Robert Senior indicates Azes II never existed and finds attributed to his reign probably should be reassigned to Azes I. The most recent research however (2015) attributes the coins to Indo-Scythian king Kharahostes or his son Mujatria, who minted posthumous issues in the name of Azes.

The Bimaran reliquary is sometimes dated, based on coinage analysis, to 0–15 CE (Fussman), more generally to 50–60 CE (British Museum), and sometimes much later (2nd century CE), based on artistic assumptions only. It is currently in the collections of the British Museum. The dating of this unique piece of art has a strong bearing on the chronology of Buddhist art and the creation of the Buddha image, as its advanced iconography implies that earlier forms had probably been existing for quite some time before.

== Excavation Methods ==
Charles Masson's (James Lewis) primary and only excavation method of the Bimaran Casket was through digging into the stupas. Unlike Johann Honigberger who excavated it before Masson came along, dug into the center of the stupa, but gave up before he was able to access the relic chamber. Honigberger was an Austrian traveler across Asia and India and wrote about his experiences there in his work "Thirty-Five Years in the East". Items found by Honigberger was mentioned to have been uncovered "more by luck than any systematic excavation technique." Masson states how Honigberger opened the monument (Bimaran stupa 2) from the north by digging into it partially and abandoning it. Masson dug into the core of the stupa to reach the main relic chamber and it was then that the Bimaran Casket was found. However, Masson's excavation technique was not very precise, and lacked modern archeology techniques, therefore making his excavation unreliable.

== Description ==
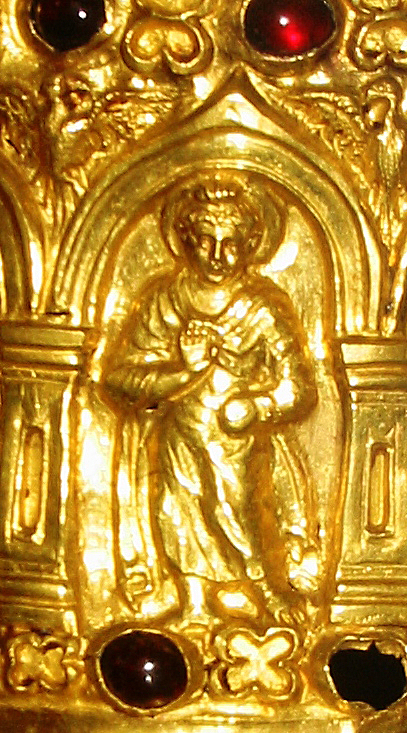
Detail of the Buddha, where the rare posture and light dress are visible.

The casket is a small container reminiscent of the Pyxis of the Classical world. It was found without its lid. There is a lotus decorating the bottom.

The casket features hellenistic representations of the Buddha (contrapposto pose, Greek himation, bundled hairstyle, wearing a moustache, realistic execution), surrounded by the Indian deities Brahma and Śakra, inside arched niches (called "homme arcade", or caitya) of Greco-Roman architecture. There are altogether eight figures in high-relief (two identical groups of Brahman-Buddha-Indra, and two devotees or Bodhisattvas in-between) and two rows of rubies from Badakhshan.

Owing to their necklace, bracelets, and armbands, and halo, the two devotees are most probably representations of Bodhisattvas. They hold their hands together in a prayerful gesture of reverence, Añjali Mudrā.

The casket is made in gold-repoussé and is very small, with a height of 7 cm (2 3/4 in). It is considered as a masterpiece of the Greco-Buddhist art of Gandhara.

=== The Buddha: a rare iconography ===
The Buddha seems to walk sideways. His right forearm goes across his chest to form the Abhaya mudra. His left fist is clenched on his hip. The gown of the Shakyamuni Buddha is quite light compared to that of the other known representations of the standing Buddha (see Standing Buddha (Tokyo National Museum)), tending to follow the outline of the body, in a rather light way. These are probably the first two layers of monastic clothing the antaravasaka and the uttarasanga, without the heavier overcoat, the sangati, which would only go as low as the knees and be more markedly folded. Also, his gown is folded over the right and left arm (rather than being held in the left hand as in the classical Buddha image), suggesting some kind of scarf-like uttariya. He has an abundant topknot covering the ushnisha, and a simple halo surrounds his head. This combination of details of the iconography (posture and clothing) is rare and only otherwise known in the coins of Kanishka (c. 150 CE), where they bear the inscription "Shakyamuni Buddha", in apparent contrast to his coins of the "Buddha" where he wears the heavy overcoat. The posture itself is well known in the art of Gandhara in sculptures of the Buddha as a Bodhisattva, but in these cases, he wears the Indian princely dhoti and the royal turban.

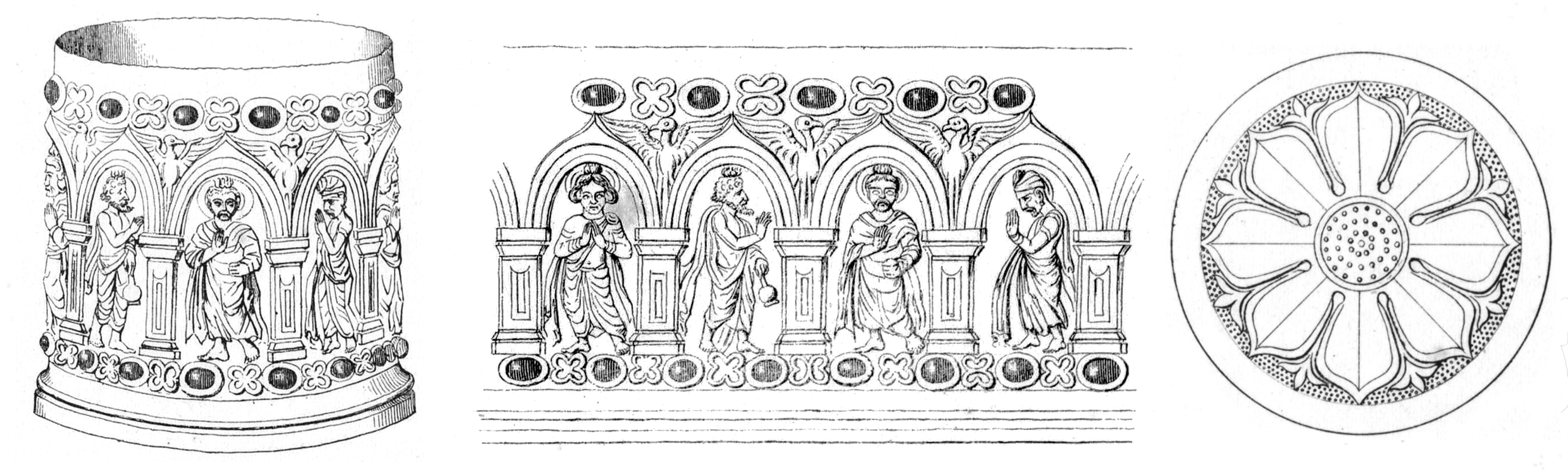
The Bimaran casket, illustrated by Charles Masson: view in volume, flattened view of a half portion of the casket, and bottom.

== Steatite container ==
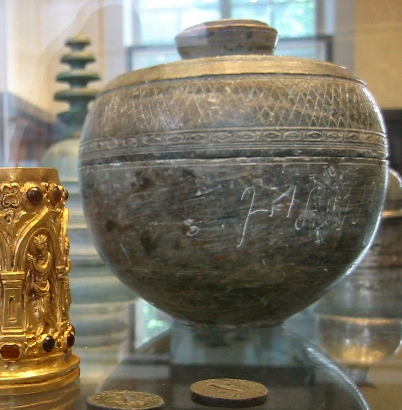
The steatite box that contained the Bimaran casket

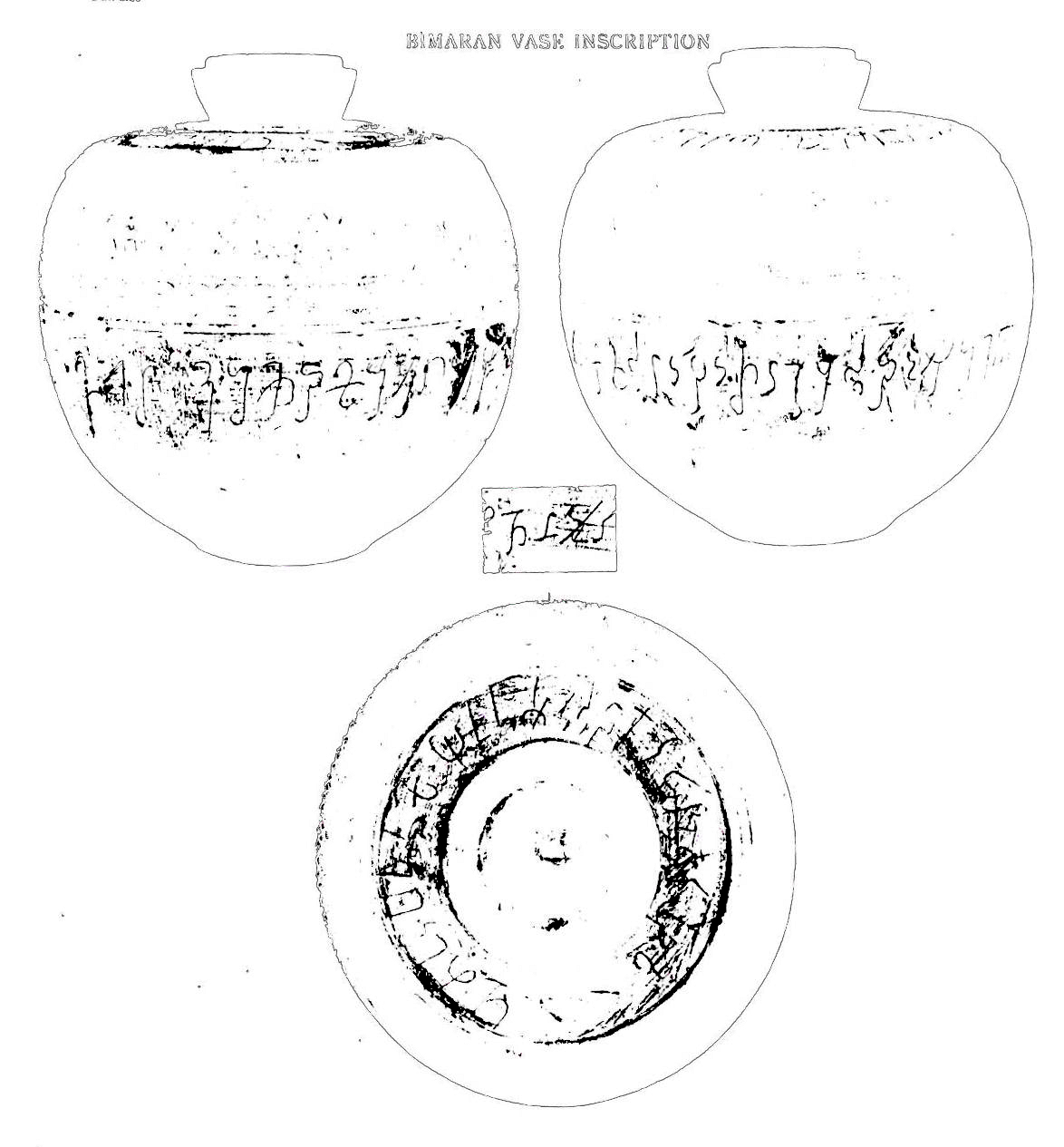
Inscriptions on the steatite box.

The Bimaran casket was kept in a steatite box, with inscriptions stating that it contained some relics of the Buddha. When opened in the 19th century, the box did not contain identifiable relics, but instead some burnt pearls, bead of precious and semi-precious stones, and the four coins of Azes II.

The inscriptions written on the box are:

Inscription of the Bimaran casket
Inscription	Original (Kharosthi script)	Transliteration	English translation
Outside of lid	𐨧𐨒𐨬𐨟 𐨭𐨪𐨁𐨪𐨅𐨱𐨁 𐨭𐨁𐨬𐨪𐨐𐨿𐨮𐨁𐨟𐨯 𐨨𐨂𐨎𐨗𐨬𐨎𐨡𐨤𐨂𐨟𐨿𐨪𐨯 𐨡𐨞𐨨𐨂𐨱𐨅	Bhagavata śarirehi Śivarakṣitasa Muṃjavaṃdaputrasa daṇamuhe	With relics of the Lord, donation of Śivarakṣita son of Mujavada
Outside of base	𐨭𐨁𐨬𐨪𐨐𐨿𐨮𐨁𐨟𐨯 𐨨𐨂𐨎𐨗𐨬𐨎𐨡𐨤𐨂𐨟𐨿𐨪𐨯 𐨡𐨞𐨨𐨂𐨱𐨅 𐨞𐨁𐨩𐨟𐨁𐨡𐨅 𐨧𐨒𐨬𐨟 𐨭𐨪𐨁𐨪𐨅𐨱𐨁 𐨯𐨪𐨿𐨬𐨦𐨂𐨢𐨞 𐨤𐨂𐨩𐨀𐨅	Śivarakṣitasa Muṃjavaṃdaputrasa daṇamuhe ṇiyatide Bhagavata śarirehi Sarvabudhaṇa puyae	Śivarakṣita son of Mujavada's donation offered with relics of the Lord in honour of all the Buddhas

== Date of the coins ==
=== Azes II ===
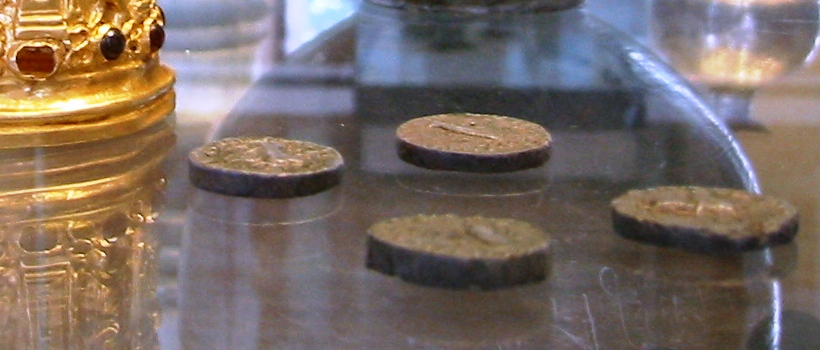
The coins of Azes II found inside the Bimaran reliquary.

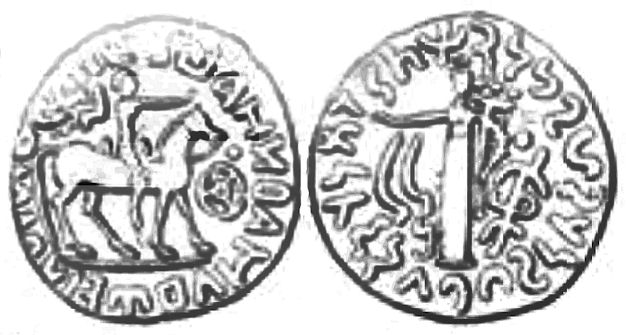
One of the coins of the Bimaran casket, illustrated by Charles Masson. Obv. Azes riding, with corrupted Greek legend (WEIΛON WEOΛΛWN IOCAAC) for ΒΑΣΙΛΕΩΣ ΒΑΣΙΛΕΩΝ ΑΖΟΥ "King of Kings Azes", and Buddhist Triratna symbol behind the head of the king. Rev. City goddess Tyche standing left holding cornucopia and raised right hand. Kharoshthi legend Maharajasa mahatasa Dhramakisa Rajatirajasa Ayasa "The Great king follower of the Dharma, King of Kings Azes".

The archeological find of the Azes II coins inside the casket would suggest a date between 30 BCE to 10 BCE. Azes II would have employed some Indo-Greek artists in the territories recently conquered, and made the dedication to a stupa. The coins are not very worn, and would therefore have been dedicated soon after their minting. Indo-Scythians are indeed known for their association with Buddhism, as in the Mathura lion capital. Such date would make the casket the earliest known representation of the Buddha:

"In the art of Gandhara, the first known image of the standing Buddha and approximatively dated, is that of the Bimaran reliquary, which specialists attribute to the Indo-Scythian period, more particularly to the rule of Azes II"

However, several features of the coins are unknown for coins of Azes: the Tyche on the reverse, the fact that the king is given the title of Dhramika in the Kharoshthi inscription on the reverse, and the fact that the Kharoshthi monograms and symbols used are those of the later Scythian king Kharahostes.

=== Kharahostes ===
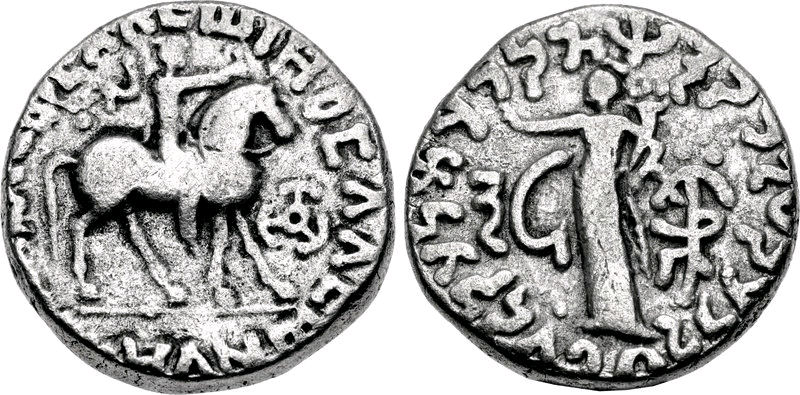
Coin of Kharahostes, in the name of Azes. Obv. Azes riding, with corrupted Greek legend (WEIΛON WEOΛΛWN IOCAAC) for ΒΑΣΙΛΕΩΣ ΒΑΣΙΛΕΩΝ ΑΖΟΥ "King of Kings Azes", and Buddhist Triratna symbol behind the head of the king. Rev. City goddess Tyche standing left holding cornucopia and raised right hand. Kharoshthi legend Maharajasa mahatasa Dhramakisa Rajatirajasa Ayasa "The Great king followower of the Dharma, King of Kings Azes"

The latest studies, made in 2015 by Joe Cribb, consider that the coins are issues of Kharahostes, or his son Mujatria. Many characteristics of the coins of the Bimaran reliquary are consistent with the coinage of Kharahostes (10 BCE–10 CE), a successor to Azes II, who minted many coins in the name of Azes II.

The four coins in the Bimaran casket are of the same type: tetradrachms of debased silver in the name of Azes, in near-new condition. On the obverse they show a king on a horse to the right with right hand extended, with a three-pellet dynastic mark and a circular legend in Greek. The legend reads in corrupted Greek WEIΛON WEOΛΛWN IOCAAC (that is, ΒΑΣΙΛΕΩΣ ΒΑΣΙΛΕΩΝ ΑΖΟΥ) "King of Kings Azes". On the reverse appears a figure of Tyche standing and holding a cornucopia, with a Kharoshthi legend. The legend reads Maharajasa mahatasa Dhramakisa Rajatirajasa Ayasa "The Great king followower of the Dharma, King of Kings Azes".

Dynastic mark of Kharahostes.
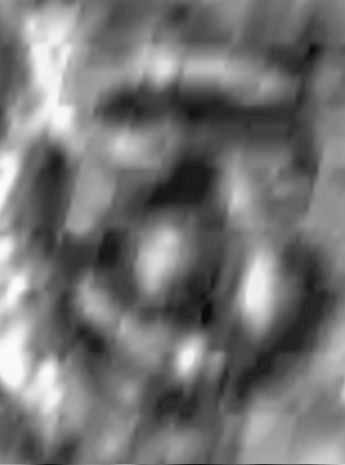
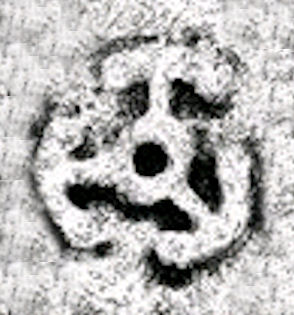
Left image: Dynastic mark (in front of the horse) on the coins of the Bimaran casket, British Museum .
Right image: Dynastic mark on a coin of Kharahostes .
The coins types and dynastic mark on the coins of the Bimaran casket are characteristic of Kharahostes.

Close-up photographs by the British Museum show that the coins do bear the name of Azes, but that they also have the "Three pellets" symbol, which is characteristic of the coinage of Kharahostes, who also often uses the name of Azes on his coinage. The coin type of the Bimaran coins is also identical to the main coins of Kharahostes (horseman with Tyche).

The name of Kharahostes has also been recently discovered on a silver Buddhist reliquary, found in Shinkot in Bajaur (Pakistan). This suggests that Kharahostes was keen on making Buddhist dedications similar to those of the Bimaran reliquary.

Without adding any redeposition theory, the Bimaran reliquary may therefore have been dedicated during the reign of Kharahostes (10 BCE – 10 CE), and probably at the beginning of his reign since the coins are not worn and where therefore basically new when they were introduced in the casket. This would put the Bimaran casket at 10 BCE, or around the beginning of our era.

=== Kujula Kadphises ===
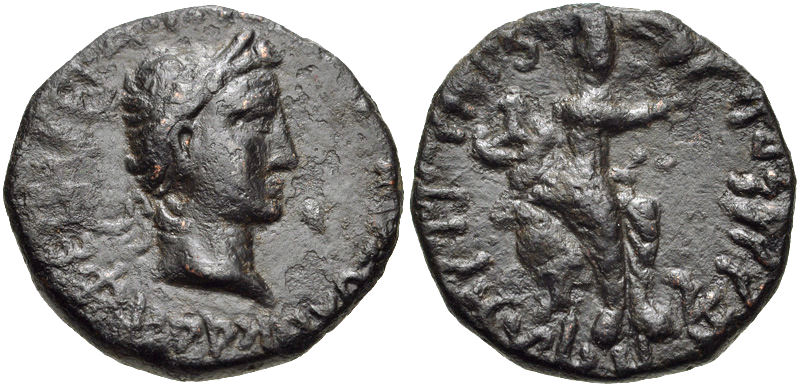
The rare coins of Kujula Kadphises with a tripartite mark resembling the three-pellet mark of Kharahostes ( on the reverse), have coin types ("Laureate head and king seated") which are totally different from those of the Bimaran reliquary. And this is the only issue of Kujula where this symbol appears.

The Kushan ruler Kudjula Kadphises does use something similar to the three-pellets mark of Kharahostes in just one of his coin types ( on the reverse of the "Laureate head and king seated" type), which has led to suggestions that the coins of the Bimaran casket may be from his reign, and can be dated to approximately 60 CE. This coin type however has nothing to do with that of the coins of the Bimaran reliquary (which are all "Horseman with Tyche"). Kudjula Kadphises is also not known to have issued Scythian-type coins in the name of Azes.

The three-pellet symbol mark is not known from any other ruler either (apart from the son of Kharahostes Mujatria), so that the only remaining possibility seems to be Kharahostes or his son, as determined by Joe Cribb in his 2015 study.

== Date of the Bimaran reliquary ==
Various disputes have been arising regarding the early date suggested for this first Buddha image.

Prof. Gérard Fussman thinks that the Bimaran reliquary was manufactured in 1–15 CE. In any case manufacture necessarily took place before 60 CE, which is the latest date considered for the coins. The Bimaran casket is on display at the British Museum (Joseph E. Hotung Gallery), which dates the casket to 60 CE.

Some also date the casket as late as the 2nd century CE based on stylistic assumptions. Susan Huntington sums up the issue:

"The well-known gold and ruby reliquary found at Bimaran in Afghanistan is generally assigned a date of about the second century AD in spite of the virtually incontrovertible scientific evidence surrounding it that suggests that it was made about the first century BC. The resistance to the early dating of the reliquary is based solely on the assumption that Buddha images were not introduced into the Buddhist artistic repertoire until the early centuries of the Christian era, and therefore that any work that bears an image of the Buddha must be of a comparably late date."

These disputes stem from the fact that the first representations of the Buddha are generally assumed to be around the 1st century CE or later, about fifty to a hundred years later than the reign of Azes II, under the rule of the Kushans. Since the Bimaran casket, with its already advanced Buddhist iconography, was manufactured at the beginning of our era, give or take a few decades, it is highly probably that much earlier images of the Buddha had already been in existence before its creation, going back to the 1st century BCE.

== Implications ==
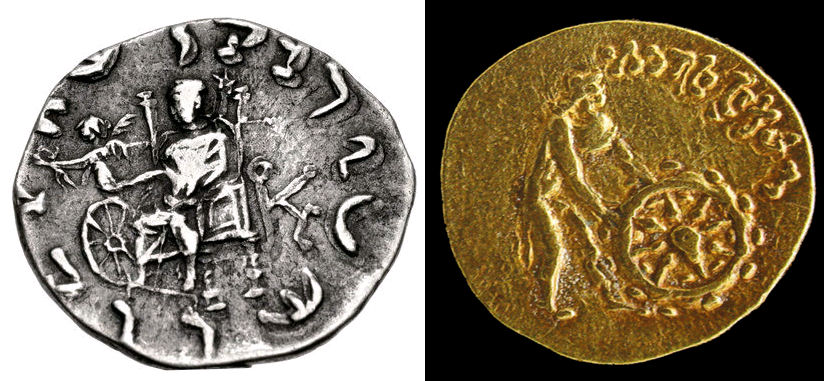
Early Buddhist imagery includes coins of Indo-Greek kings such as Menander II (left, circa 90–85 BCE), in which Zeus, through Nike, hands a wreath of victory to a Wheel of the Law, or the Tillya Tepe Buddhist coin (right, 1st c. BCE – 1st c. CE).

Since the casket already displays quite a sophisticated iconography (Brahma and Indra as attendants, Bodhisattvas) in an advanced style, it would suggest much earlier representations of the Buddha had been current by the time of the deposition of the Bimaran casket (10 BCE – 10 CE), going back to the rule of the Indo-Greeks in the 1st century BCE. The last Indo-Greek kings Strato II and Strato III ruled until around 20 CE. This view, that Greco-Buddhist art already was flourishing in the 1st century BCE under the sponsorship of Indo-Greek kings, was originally advocated by Alfred A. Foucher and others, although with much less archaeological evidence.

Stylistically, the casket (gold inlaid with precious stone) is also highly consistent with the art of the Scythians, as known for example from the Tillya tepe archaeological site in northern Afghanistan. The Tillya tepe treasure is also dated to the 1st century BCE, and also has what could be early representations of the Buddha, such as the Tillya Tepe Buddhist coin.

The Bimaran casket also has some similarities with the Kanishka casket, which however is of much coarser execution, and securely dated to around 127 CE.

== Other views ==
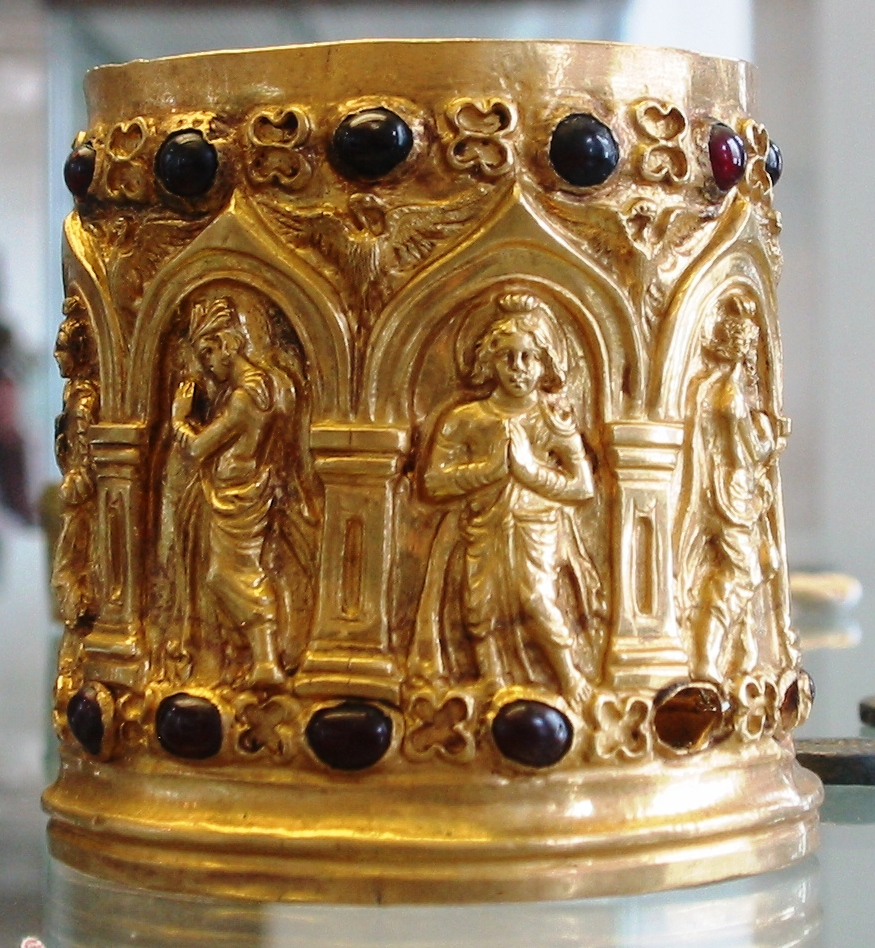
Another face of the Bimaran casket, featuring a devotee, possibly a Bodhisattva

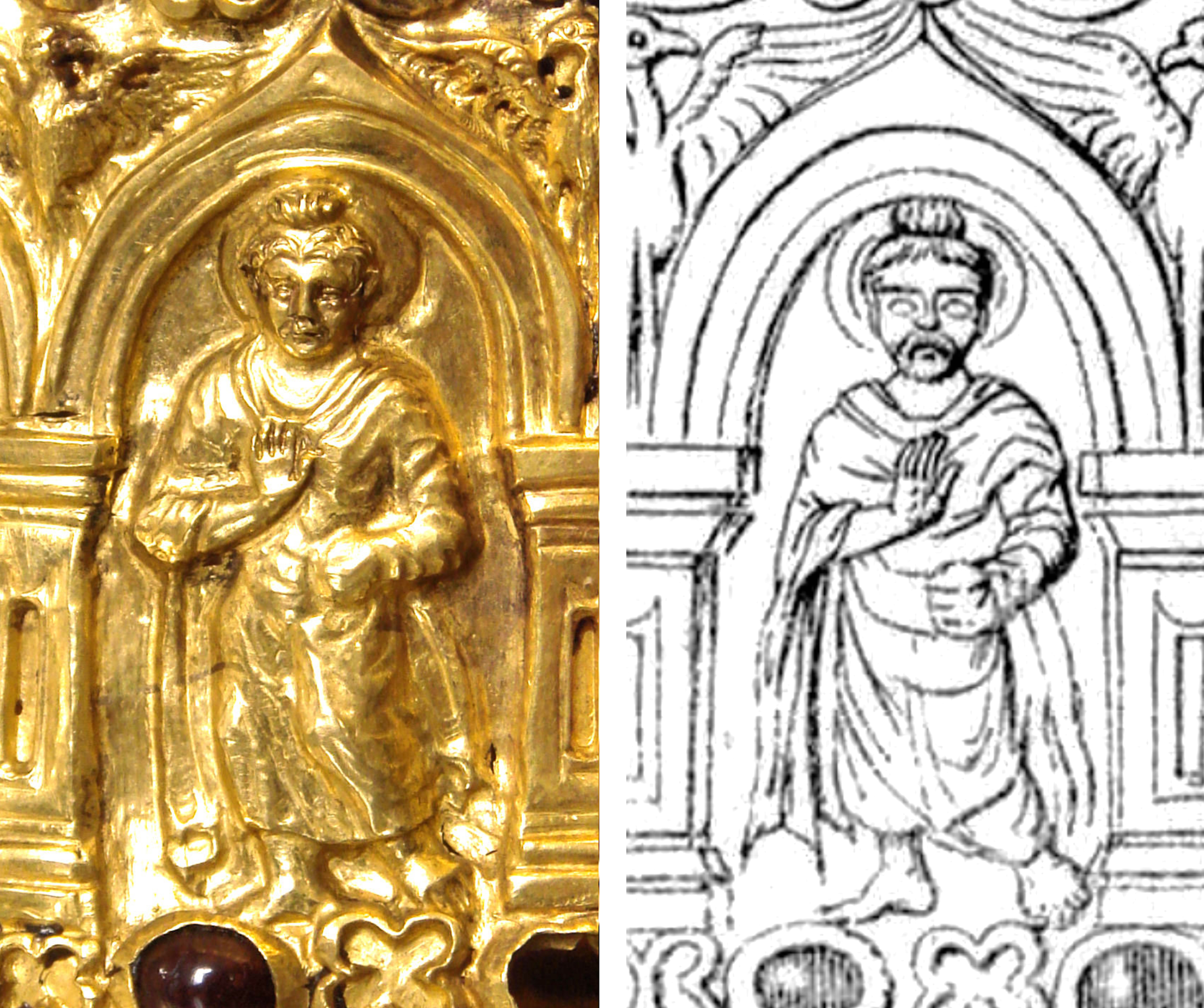
Detail of the Buddha on the Bimaran casket

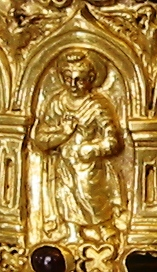
Detail of the Buddha (other angle)

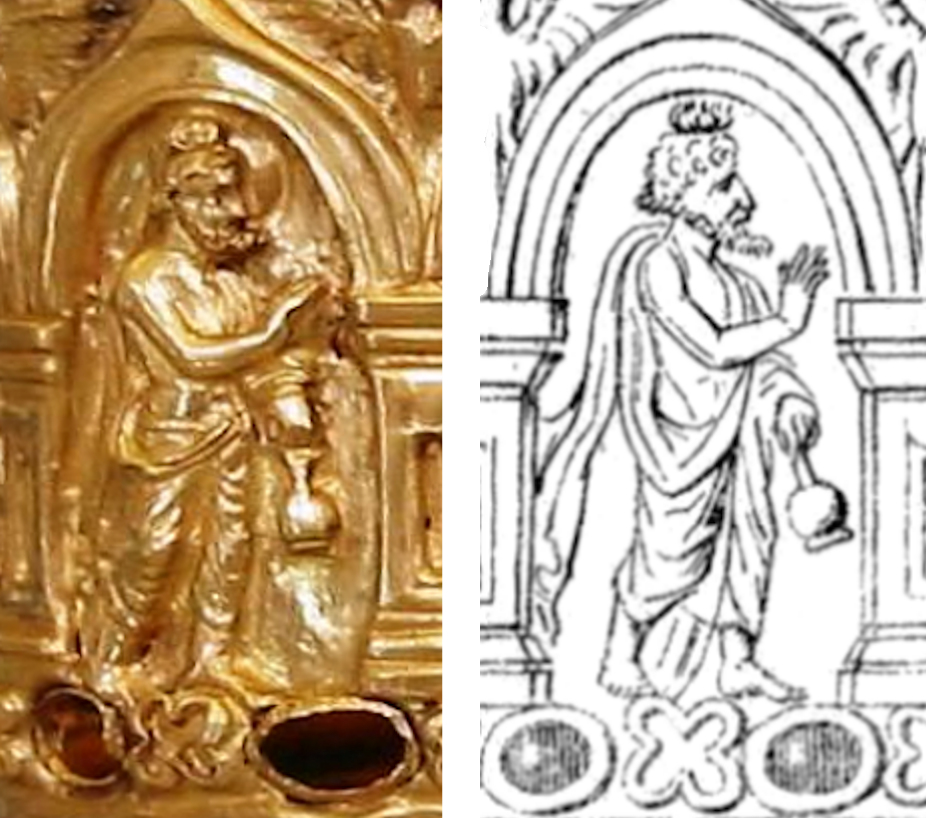
Vedic deity Brahma on the Bimaran casket. (Note: "The Bimaran Reliquary, a Gandharan work, which is now housed in the British Museum, London, is of great historical and iconographic significance. It shows Buddha in the centre, attended by Brahma to his right and Indra to the left.") (Note: "Standing Buddha in the arched compartment, flanked by figures of Brahma and Indra standing in similar compartments, detail of the side of Bimaran gold casket".)

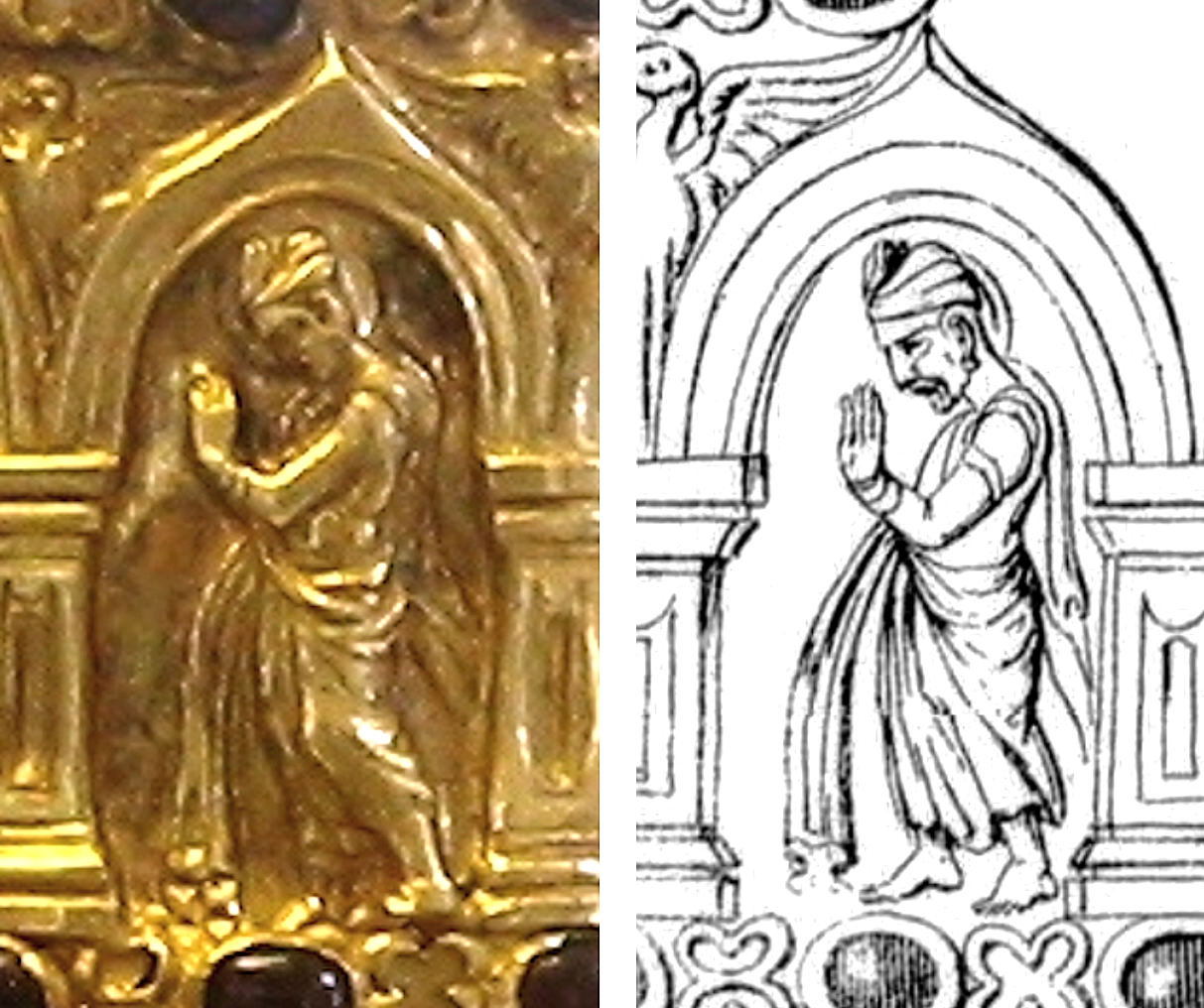
Vedic deity Indra on the Bimaran casket. (Note: "The Bimaran Reliquary, a Gandharan work, which is now housed in the British Museum, London, is of great historical and iconographic significance. It shows Buddha in the centre, attended by Brahma to his right and Indra to the left.") (Note: "Standing Buddha in the arched compartment, flanked by figures of Brahma and Indra standing in similar compartments, detail of the side of Bimaran gold casket")

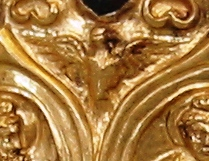
Detail of hamsa goose

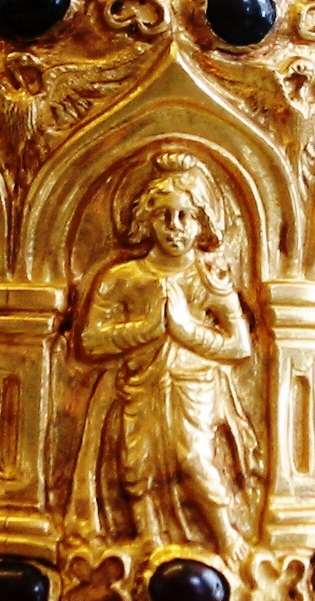
Detail of a Bodhisattva (see halo).

== See also ==
- Kanishka casket

== Sources ==
- Agrawala, Prithvi Kumar (1977). Early Indian Bronzes. Varanasi, India: Prithvi Prakashan.
- Banerjee, Priyatosh (2001). Central Asian art: new revelations from Xinjiang. Noida, Uttar Pradesh, India: Abha Prakashan. ISBN 9788185704241.
- Baums, David (2012). "Catalog and revised texts and translations of Gandharan reliquary inscriptions" (PDF). In Jongeward, D.; Errington, E.; Salomon, R.; Baums, S. (eds.). Gandharan Buddhist reliquaries. Seattle: University of Washington Press. pp. 200–309. ISBN 978-0-295-99236-5.
- Bopearachchi, O.; Landes, C.; Sachs, C. (2003). De l'Indus à l'Oxus: archéologie de l'Asie centrale : catalogue de l'exposition. Lattes: Musée de Lattes. ISBN 978-2-9516679-2-1.
- Cribb, Joe (2015). "Dating and locating Mujatria and the two Kharahostes" (PDF). Journal of the Oriental Numismatic Society. 223: 26–48.
- Errington, Elizabeth; Cribb, Joe; Claringbull, Maggie, eds. (1992). The Crossroads of Asia : transformation in image and symbol in the art of ancient Afghanistan and Pakistan. Cambridge: Ancient India and Iran Trust, Fitzwilliam Museum. ISBN 978-0-9518399-1-1.
- Huntington, Susan L. (1990). "Early Buddhist art and the theory of aniconism". Art Journal. 49 (4): 401–408. doi:10.1080/00043249.1990.10792724.
- Masson, Charles (1841). "Memoir on the topes and sepulchral monuments of Afghanistan". In Wilson, H.H. (ed.). Ariana Antiqua: A Descriptive Account of the Antiquities and Coins of Afghanistan. London: East India Company. pp. 55–118.
- Salomon, Richard (1996). "An inscribed silver Buddhist reliquary of the time of King Kharaosta and Prince Indravarman". Journal of the American Oriental Society. 116 (3): 418–452. doi:10.2307/605147. JSTOR 605147.
- Senior, R.C. (2008). "The final nail in the coffin of Azes II" (PDF). Journal of the Oriental Numismatic Society. 197: 25–27.
