= Richard Abdy =

British numismatist (born 1970)

Richard Anthony Abdy (born 1970) is a British numismatist at the British Museum, specialising in Roman coins.

== Biography ==
Abdy graduated in 1992 from the University of Glasgow with a degree in History. His area of expertise is Britain in Roman times and its border fortifications, known as the Limes Britannicus. He worked on coin finds on the Antonine Wall at the Hunter Coin Collection at the University of Glasgow Hunterian Collection. His supervisors were Dr Donal Bateson and Dr Phil Freeman.

He joined the staff of the British Museum in 1993, as an assistant in the Department of Greek and Roman Antiquities. In 1998 he became one of the two curators of Iron Age and Roman coins in the Department of Coins and Medals. His responsibilities included processing coin hoards acquired or offered for sale by the Treasure Act 1996

== Awards and honours ==
- 2002 Lhotka Memorial Prize for Romano-British Coin Hoards
- 2010 Gilljam-Prize for his article “The Domitian coin from Chalgrove: a Gallic emperor returns to history“ about the second Antoninian coin of Domitianus II (the discovery of which confirmed the authenticity of the first coin and the existence of the anti-emperor Domitianus II).
- 2013 Lhotka Memorial Prize for Coins and the Bible (co-authored with Amelia Dowler)
- 2022 The inaugural Collier Prize in Ancient Numismatics for RIC II.3 – From AD 117–138: Hadrian
- 2024 BBC History Magazine Best Books of the Year for Legion – Life in the Roman Army

== Exhibitions at the British Museum ==
- 2004 Public Image: Portraits on Coins & Medals
- 2013 Coins and the Bible (co-curated with Amelia Dowler)
- 2024 Legion: Life in the Roman Army

== Selected publications ==
=== Books ===
- 2002 - Romano-British Coin Hoards, Shire Publications, Princes Risborough. ISBN 0-7478-0532-6.
- 2002 - Coin Hoards from Roman Britain 11 (RNS Special Publication 36) Royal Numismatic Society, London. ISBN 0-901405-68-X. (co-edited with Ian Leins and Jonathan Williams)
- 2008 - Roman Army. Pocket Dictionary. British Museum Press, London. ISBN 0-7141-3126-1.
- 2009 - Coin Hoards from Roman Britain 12 (Collection Moneta 97). Moneta, Wetteren. ISBN 978-90-77297-64-3. (co-editor with Eleanor Ghey, Celine Hughes and Ian Leins)
- 2010 - The Gloucester hoard and other coin hoards of the Britannic Empire (Coin Hoards from Roman Britain 13; Collection Moneta 113). Moneta, Wetteren 2010, ISBN 978-90-77297-81-0. (co-ed. with Edward Besly and Fernando López-Sánchez)
- 2013 - Coins and the Bible. Spink & Son, London. ISBN 978-1-907427-74-9 (exhibition catalogue) (with Amelia Dowler)
- 2019 - The Beau Street, Bath Hoard (Archaeopress Roman Archaeology 59). Archaeopress, Oxford. ISBN 978-1-78491-594-0. (with Verity Anthony and Stephen Clews)
- 2019 - From AD 117–138: Hadrian (Roman Imperial Coinage. Vol. 2, Part 3). Spink & Son, London. ISBN 978-1-912667-18-5. (with Peter Franz Mittag)
- 2024 - Legion. Life in the Roman army. The British Museum Press, London. ISBN 978-0-7141-2293-9.

=== Articles ===
- 2004 - "The second-known specimen of a coin of Domitian II recorded in a hoard from Oxfordshire", Revue Numismatique 160, pp. 219–221.
- 2005 - "Two important new Roman coins", Numismatic Chronicle 165, pp. 175-178. doi:10.2307/42667281 (with Nicholas Harling)
- 2006 - "A Catalogue of Hoards and Single-Finds from the British Isles c. AD 410–67", in Barrie Cook and Gareth Williams (eds), Coinage and History in the North Sea World, c. AD 500–1250. Essays in Honour of Marion Archibald, pp. 11-73. Brill, Leiden. ISBN 90-04-14777-2. (with Gareth Williams)
- 2009 - "The Domitian coin from Chalgrove: a Gallic emperor returns to history", Antiquity, vol. 83, no. 321 (Sept 2009), pp. 751-757. doi:10.1017/S0003598X00098963.
- 2012 - "Coin hoards from the British Isles 2012", British Numismatic Journal, vol. 82, pp. 230-244. (with Martin Allen, Roger Bland, Eleanor Ghey and John Naylor)
- 2014 - "Chronology of Sabina’s coinage at the Roman mint", Revue Numismatique 171, pp. 73–91.

== Source ==
This record is translated from the Wikipedia entry in German for Richard Abdy.
