= Yordanka Youroukova =

Bulgarian numismatist

- Occupations: Numismatist, archaeologist

Academic background
- Education: Sofia University; Sorbonne University

Academic work
- Discipline: Numismatics
- Sub-discipline: Thracian coinage Bulgarian sigillography

Yordanka Nikoleva Youroukova (Bulgarian: Йорданка Николова Юрукова; 19 January 1936 – 31 March 2012) was a Bulgarian archaeologist and numismatist, who was a corresponding member of the Bulgarian Academy of Sciences.

== Biography ==
Youroukova was born in 1936 in Sofia. In 1960, she graduated in history at Sofia University, where her teacher was Prof. Todor Gerasimov [bg]. She subsequently went to France to the Sorbonne University for her doctoral studies. She defended a thesis entitled: "Les ateliers de l'Orient Byzantin" ("The mints in the Byzantine Orient"). After her return, she successively became a research associate (1962), senior research associate (second degree) in 1974 and (first degree) in 1987. In 2008, she was elected a corresponding member of the Bulgarian Academy of Sciences.

For much of her career, Youroukova taught at the Faculty of History at Sofia University: from 1974 as a part-time lecturer in numismatics, and from 1992 as a professor of numismatics. Between 1975 and 1997 she lectured part-time at Veliko Tarnovo University. From 1992 to 2001 she was the director of the Archeology Department of the New Bulgarian University. She lectured widely, including at the Sorbonne, and at the universities of Uppsala, Geneva, Munich, Frankfurt, and San Diego. She was the editor (1966–1974) and chief editor (from 1974) of the magazine "Numismatica", and from 1974 to 2004 she was a member of the editorial board of the magazine "Archaeologia". She retired in 2003 and died on 31 March 2012.

Youroukova specialised in Thracian coinage, publishing widely on the subject. She demonstrated that the coinage of Rhoimetalkes I was more impressive than his heirs'. She also worked on the coinage of Lower Mysia and had research interests in medieval Bulgarian seals and Byzantine sigillography.

== Recognition ==
- Honorary Member - Romanian Numismatic Society (1985)
- Vermeil Token - French Numismatic Society (1986)
- Honorary Member - Croatian Numismatic Society (1987)
- Corresponding Member - American Numismatic Society (1990)
- Honorary member - Union of Numismatic Societies in Bulgaria (1995)
- Honorary Member - Royal Numismatic Society of Belgium (1996)
- Corresponding Member - German Archaeological Institute (2002)
- Corresponding Member - Bulgarian Academy of Sciences (2008)

== Selected works ==
- 1971 – „Античните монети в България“ (Ancient Coins in Bulgaria)
- 1978 – „24 монети и печати от България“ (24 Coins and Stamps from Bulgaria)
- 1987 – „Монетосеченето на градовете в Долна Мизия и Тракия. II–III в. в Хадрианопол“ (The coinage of the cities in Lower Mysia and Thrace. II–III centuries in Hadrianople)
- 1994 – „Монетите на тракийските племена и владетели“ (
- 2006 – „Съкровища с виза)нтийски монети )на Балканите“ (Treasures of Byzantine Coins in the Balkans)
