= Philip Attwood =

British numismatist

- Born: 23 March 1954 (age 72)
- Education: University of Birmingham
- Known for: Studies in Italian and British medallic history
- Awards: (1992 and 2003): Lhotka Prize (RNS)
- Scientific career
- Fields: Numismatics, Medallics

Philip Attwood (born 23 March 1954) is a British numismatist associated with the British Museum Department of Coins and Medals, where he served as chief curator until his retirement in 2020.

His brother is David Attwood (film director).

== Biography ==
Philip Attwood graduated in Ancient history and Archaeology from the University of Birmingham in 1975.

He joined the British Museum in 1978, initially as an assistant in the Department of Greek and Roman Antiquities, before becoming a curator in the Department of Coins and Medals the following year. In 2010, he was appointed chief curator of this department, succeeding Joe Cribb.

As chief curator, Attwood was responsible for the department's acquisition program. During his tenure, notable acquisitions included a gold medal by British sculptor Alfred Gilbert (1854–1934) and a significant donation by his departmental colleague Marion Archibald, which was realized following her death in 2016.

Attwood specialized in the Italian Renaissance medallic history of the 16th century and British medallic history of the 19th century.

Since 2012, he has served as the president of the International Art Medal Federation (FIDEM) and was also named an honorary member of the Royal Numismatic Society of Belgium.

Attwood retired on 1 May 2020, after 41 years of service at the Department of Coins and Medals of the British Museum.

== Awards ==
- (1992 and 2003): Lhotka Prize, awarded by the Royal Numismatic Society.

== Publications ==
- (1992). Artistic circles: the medal in Britain 1880–1918. British Museum. ISBN 9780714108742
- (2002). British art medals 1982–2002. British Art Medal Society. ISBN 978-0953698837
- (2003). Italian medals, c.1530–1600, in British public collections. British Museum. ISBN 9780714108612
- (2004). Badges. British Museum. ISBN 9780714150147
- (2004). The British Columbia medals of John Lobban: painter, sculptor, designer and illustrator 1919–1996. British Art Medal Society. ISBN 9780953698851
- (2009). Medals of dishonour. British Museum. ISBN 9780714118161
- (2014). Hard at work: the diary of Leonard Wyon 1853–1867. Spink, London. ISBN 9781907427329
- (2015). Medal Artists of New Zealand: regroup, reflect, regenerate. Marte Szirmay, Auckland. ISBN 9780473329037

== See also ==
- British Museum Department of Coins and Medals
