= Lucia Travaini =

Italian numismatist

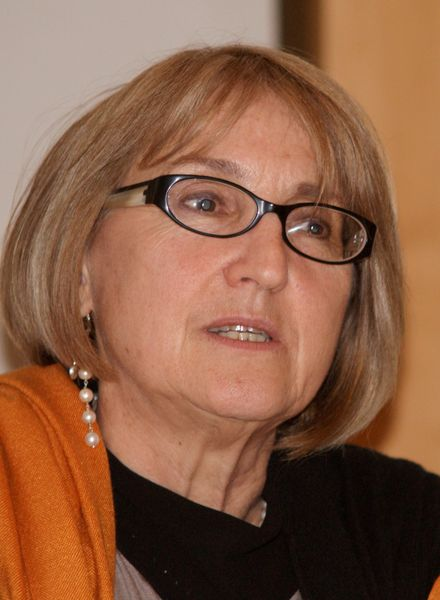
- Lucia Travainiat the spring meeting of the Constance Working Group in April 2014 in Hegne
- Born: 3 August 1953 (age 73); Rome, Italy
- Occupations: Numismatist, archaeologist, and academic
- Board member of: Société française de numismatique; Italian Numismatic Society; Royal Numismatic Society; Royal Numismatic Society of Belgium; International Numismatic Council
- Awards: Medal of the Royal Numismatic Society (2012); Prix Duchalais (Académie des Inscriptions et Belles-Lettres, 2014)

Academic background
- Education: Sapienza University of Rome
- Academic advisor: Philip Grierson

Academic work
- Discipline: Archelology
- Sub-discipline: Numismatics
- Institutions: National Roman Museum; University of Cambridge (92-98); University of Milan (98-2023)
- Website: Official website

Lucia Travaini (born 3 August 1953) is an Italian numismatist, archaeologist, and academic. She is an Associate Professor of Medieval and Modern Numismatics at the University of Milan.

== Life ==
Travaini studied archaeology at the Sapienza University of Rome. She worked for the Soprintendenza Archeologica, the Ministry of Cultural Heritage, and at the National Roman Museum. From 1992 to 1998, she was a senior research associate to Philip Grierson at the Fitzwilliam Museum, University of Cambridge. In 1998, she returned to Italy to join the University of Milan. She also taught at her alma mater between 2002 and 2005.

== Honours ==
In 2012, Travaini was awarded the Medal of the Royal Numismatic Society, one of the highest awards for numismatists. In 2014, she was awarded the Prix Duchalais by the Académie des Inscriptions et Belles-Lettres for her book Le zecche italiane fino all'Unità (published 2011). In 2016, she was elected an honorary member of the Royal Numismatic Society of Belgium.

== Selected works ==
- Travaini, Lucia (1995). La Monetazione nell'Italia normanna (in Italian). Rome: Istituto Storico Italiano per il Medioevo.
- Grierson, Philip; Travaini, Lucia (1998). Medieval European coinage: Medieval European Coinage: Volume 14, South Italy, Sicily, Sardinia: With a Catalogue of the Coins in the Fitzwilliam Museum, Cambridge. Cambridge: Cambridge University Press. ISBN 978-0521582315.
- Travaini, Lucia (2011). Le zecche italiane fino all'Unità (in Italian). Roma: Libreria dello Stato, Istituto poligrafico e Zecca dello Stato. ISBN 978-8824013338.
