= Charles Masson =

British East India Company soldier, explorer and amateur archaeologist

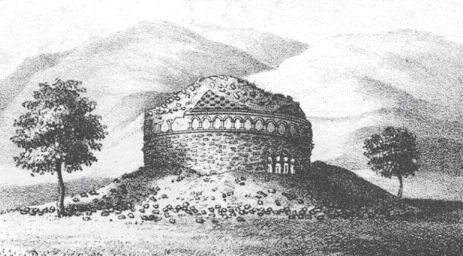
The Stupa No.2 at Bimaran, where the Bimaran reliquary was excavated. Drawing by Charles Masson.

Charles Masson (1800–1853) was the pseudonym of James Lewis, a British East India Company soldier, independent explorer and pioneering archaeologist and numismatist. He was the first European to discover the ruins of Harappa near Sahiwal in Punjab, now in Pakistan. He found the ancient city of Alexandria in the Caucasus (modern Begram) dating to Alexander the Great. He unlocked the now-extinct script known as Kharoshthi. At the time of the 1838 First Anglo-Afghan War, Masson had spent more time in Afghanistan than any other British subject. He was a minority voice critical of the invasion and accurately predicted it would be a disaster for the British Empire.

== Early life ==
Charles Masson was born James Lewis on 16 February 1800 at 58 Aldermanbury within the City of London. He was the elder son of George Lewis and Mary Hopcraft. His father was a tradesman and a member of the Needlemakers Company. His mother's family were farmers in Croughton, Northamptonshire, who subsequently became brewers. His younger brother George was born in 1803. Charles went to school in Walthamstow, almost certainly Monoux School (now Sir George Monoux College), where he learned some Latin and Greek. On leaving school he worked as a clerk with a silk and insurance broker in the city. When aged 21 he enlisted with the army of the British East India Company and sailed for Bengal on 17 January 1822.

== Travels ==
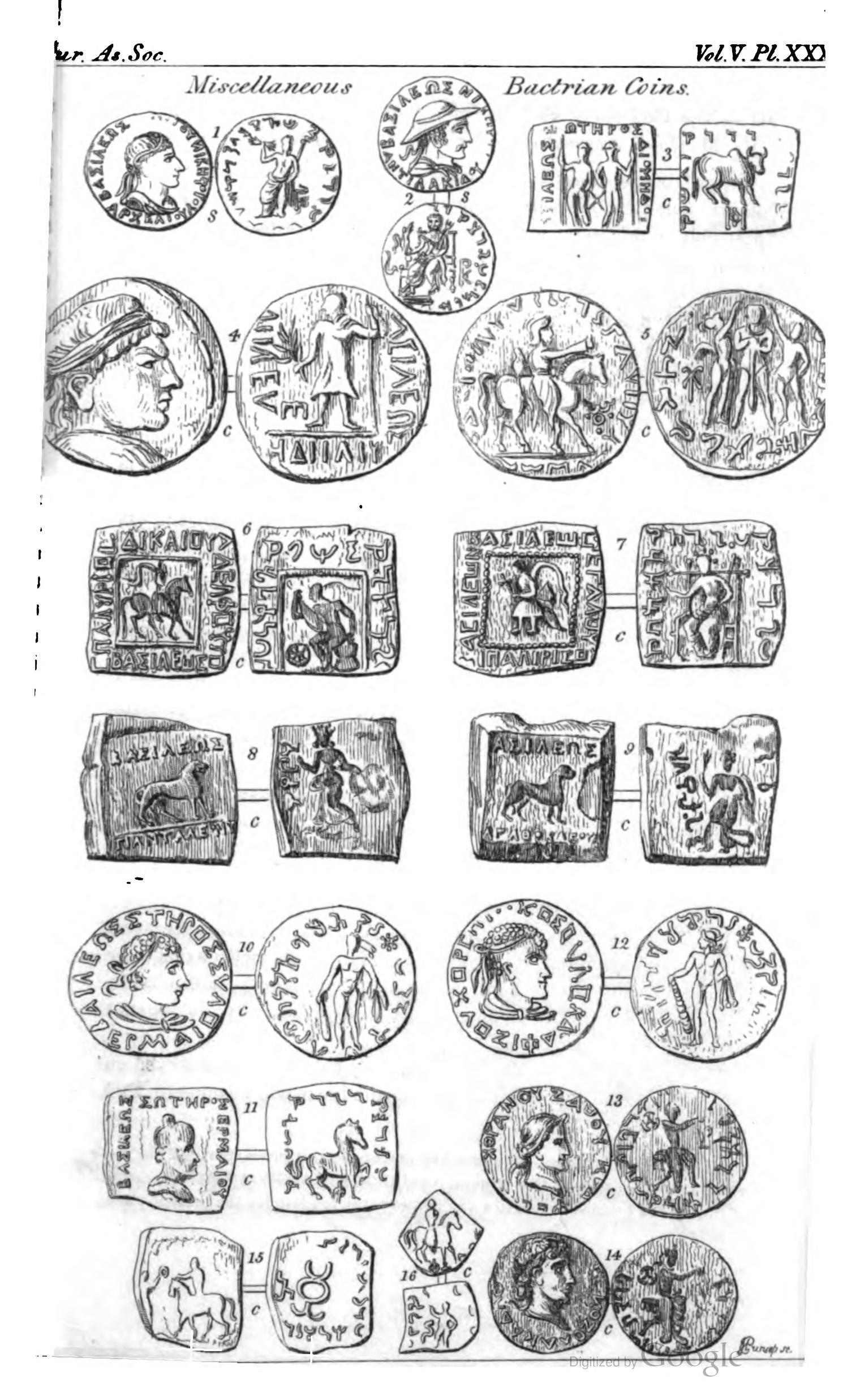
A plate of Masson's Bactrian coins, published in the Journal of the Asiatic Society of Bengal, 1836.

He fought in the Siege of Bharatpur in January 1826. In 1827, while stationed at Agra, he and a fellow British soldier Richard Potter deserted and traveled through parts of the Punjab that were under British control at that time. To avoid capture, it was at this time that Lewis began to go by the alias Charles Masson while Potter went by John Brown.

At Ahmadpur, they were rescued by the American Josiah Harlan and commissioned as mounted orderlies in his expedition to overthrow the regime in Kabul, Afghanistan. Not long afterward, near Dera Ghazi Khan, Masson deserted Harlan. While with Harlan, Masson and Brown pretended to be Americans to further lessen the chance of being caught as deserters. Masson was so successful in claiming to be from Kentucky that long after his death he was still being described as an American.

Between 1833 and 1838, Masson excavated over 50 Buddhist sites around Kabul and Jalalabad in south-eastern Afghanistan, amassing a large collection of small objects and many coins, principally from the site at Bagram (the ancient Alexandria on the Caucasus), north of Kabul. From 1827, when he deserted, to his return to England in 1842, it is estimated that Masson collected around 47,000 coins.

Masson was the first European to see the ruins of Harappa, described and illustrated in his book Narrative of Various Journeys in Balochistan, Afghanistan and The Punjab. He also visited the North-West Frontier Province and Balochistan, serving as an agent of the East India Company.

In the 1930s, the French Archaeological Delegation in Afghanistan (Délégation archéologique française en Afghanistan, DAFA) found unexpected evidence of an earlier European visitor scribbled in pencil on the wall of one of the caves above the 55 meter Buddha at Bamiyan:

If any fool this high samootch explore,
Know Charles Masson has been here before

== Return to London ==
In 1841 he sailed from Bombay to Suez, crossed Egypt overland, caught a boat to France where he visited Paris, and finally arrived back in London in March 1842. He had been away for 20 years. He received a pension of £100 a year from the East India Company. On 19 February 1844 he married Mary Ann Kilby, an 18 year old farmer's daughter. They had two children, a son born in 1850 and a daughter born in 1853. Masson died, probably of a stroke, in Edmonton in north London on 5 November 1853.

== Collection at the British Museum ==
Through his wide-ranging travels, Masson built up an extraordinary collection of artefacts largely from the modern states of Afghanistan and Pakistan. Numbering over 9,000 objects most are now held by the British Museum. The collection includes more than 7,000 coins. Beginning in 1993, a project at the museum led by Elizabeth Errington organised the material into an accessible study collection. The project resulted in the publication in 2017 and 2021 of three volumes describing the collection and linking it to the surviving documentation, much of which is held by the British Library.

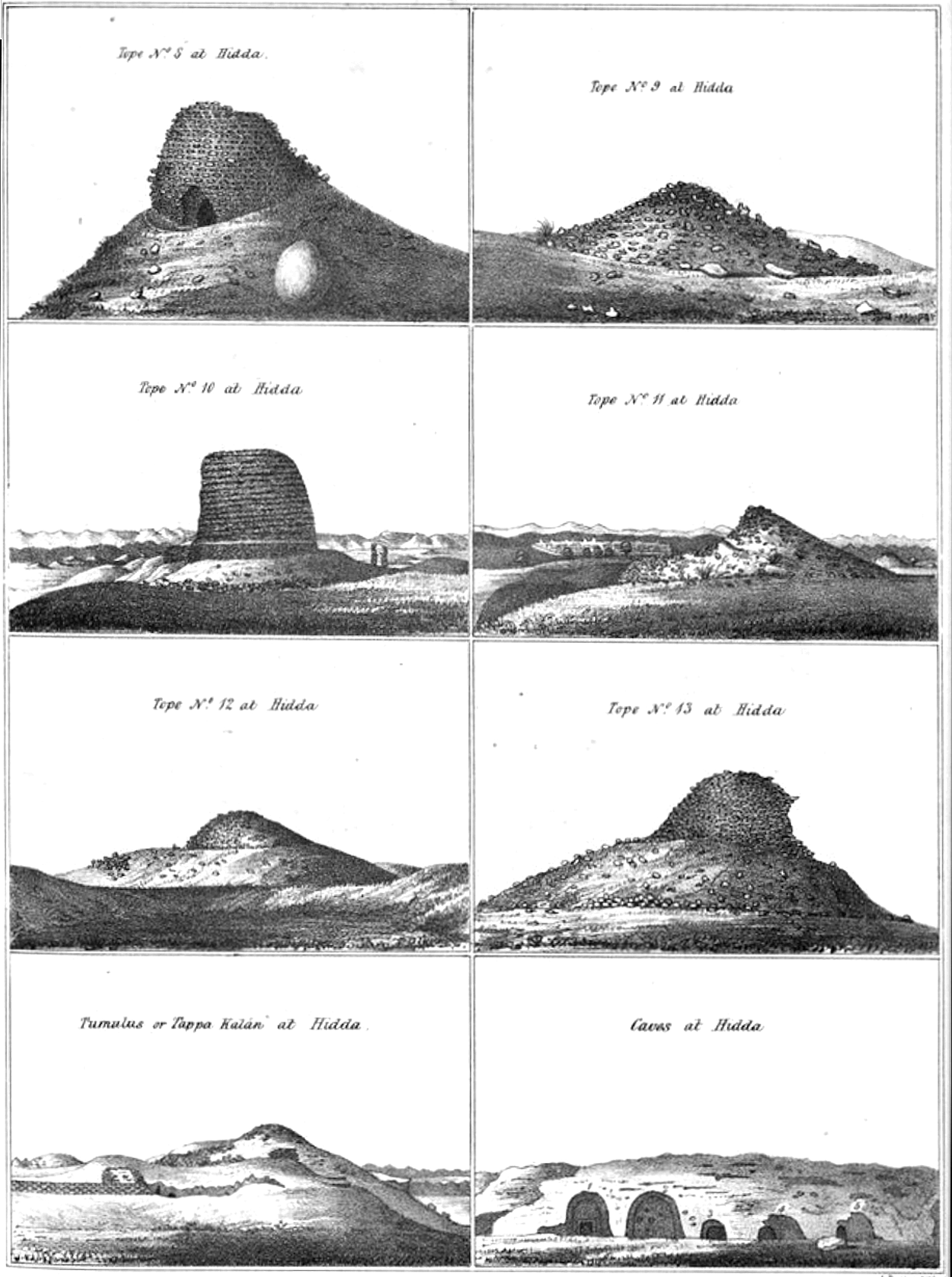
Stupas and caves in Hadda, by Charles Masson, 1842

== Works ==
- Masson, Charles (1834). "Memoir on the ancient coins found at Beghram, in the Kohistan of Kabul". Journal of the Asiatic Society of Bengal. 3 (28): 153–175.
- —— (1836). "Second memoir on the ancient coins found at Beghram, in the Kohistan of Kabul". Journal of the Asiatic Society of Bengal. 5 (49): 1–38.
- —— (1836). "Note on an inscription at Bamyan". Journal of the Asiatic Society of Bengal. 5 (51): 188.
- —— (1836). "Third memoir on the ancient coins found at Beghram, in the Kohistan of Kabul". Journal of the Asiatic Society of Bengal. 5 (57): 537–547.
- —— (1836). "Notes on the antiquities of Bamian". Journal of the Asiatic Society of Bengal. 5 (59): 707–720.
- —— (1840). "Papers on Afghanistan, containing the narrative of journeys performed in that and the adjacent countries, between 1827 and 1830". Transactions of the Bombay Geographical Society. 5: 1–198.
- —— (1841). "Memoir on the topes and sepulchral monuments of Afghanistan". In Wilson, H.H. (ed.). Ariana Antiqua: A Descriptive Account of the Antiquities and Coins of Afghanistan. London: East India Company. pp. 55–118.
- —— (1842). Narrative of various journeys in Balochistan, Afghanistan, and the Panjab, 3 vols. London: Richard Bentley.
- —— (1843). Narrative of a journey to Kalât : including an account of the insurrection at that place in 1840 and a memoir on Eastern Balochistan. London: Richard Bentley.
- —— (1846). "Narrative of an excursion from Pesháwer to Sháh-Báz Ghari". Journal of the Royal Asiatic Society of Great Britain and Ireland. 8: 293–302. doi:10.1017/S0035869X00142844. JSTOR 25207614. S2CID 163543425.
- —— (1848). Legends of the Afghan Countries, in Verse. London: James Madden.
- —— (1850). "Illustration of the route from Seleucia to Apobatana, as given by Isidorus of Charax". Journal of the Royal Asiatic Society of Great Britain and Ireland. 12: 97–124. doi:10.1017/S0035869X00143059. JSTOR 25228621. S2CID 163037723.

== See also ==
- Harappa
- Indus Valley civilization

== Sources ==
- Errington, Elizabeth (2002). "Ancient Afghanistan through the eyes of Charles Masson (1800–1853): The Masson Project at the British Museum" (PDF). International Institute for Asian Studies: Newsletter. 27: 8–9.
- Errington, Elizabeth (2017a). Charles Masson and the Buddhist Sites of Afghanistan: Explorations, Excavations, Collections 1832–1835. British Museum Research Publication 215. London: British Museum Press. ISBN 978-0-86159-215-9.
- Errington, Elizabeth (2017b). The Charles Masson Archive: British Library, British Museum and Other Documents Relating to the 1832–1838 Masson Collection from Afghanistan. British Museum Research Publication 216. London: British Museum Press. ISBN 978-0-86159-216-6.
- Errington, Elizabeth (2021). Errington, Elizabeth (ed.). Charles Masson: Collections from Begram and Kabul Bazaar, Afghanistan, 1833–1838. British Museum Research Publication 219. London: British Museum Press. doi:10.5281/zenodo.5109798. ISBN 978-0-86159-219-7.
- Hackin, Joseph; Carl, Jean (1933). Nouvelles recherches archéologiques à Bāmiyān. Paris: G. Van Oest. p. 2.
- Richardson, Edmund (2021). Alexandria: The Quest for the Lost City. London: Bloomsbury Publishing. ISBN 978-1-5266-0378-4.
- Whitteridge, Gordon (1986). Charles Masson of Afghanistan: Explorer, Archaeologist, Numismatist and Intelligence Agent. Warminster, UK: Aris & Phillips. ISBN 978-0-85668-318-3.
