= François Thierry (numismatist) =

French numismatist

François Thierry de Crussol, known by his Chinese name 蒂埃里 (Di Ali), is a French numismatist, specialising in East Asian currency.

== Career ==
Thierry is honorary curator at the Département des Monnaies et Médailles, Bibliothèque nationale de France. Before retirement he was curator of Oriental coins, and a leading scholar in this field, having produced several well-received books, catalogues of the BnF collection, and numerous articles relating to East Asian numismatics.

== Awards and honours ==
- 2024 - Awarded the Lhotka Prize for Chinese Numismatics - the world of Chinese money (co-authored with Helen Wang and Lyce Jankowski)
- 2017 Awarded the Prix Hirayama - by the Académie des Inscriptions et Belles Lettres - for his book Les monnaies de la Chine ancienne, des origines à la fin de l'Empire (Paris, Les Belles-Lettres, 2017).
- 2006 Awarded the Medal of the Royal Numismatic Society

== Publications ==
This is a selection of Thierry's works.

Selected Books

- 2017 - Les monnaies de la Chine ancienne, des origines à la fin de l'Empire (Paris, Les Belles-Lettres)
- 2016 - Royaume du lion, ceylan connu des chinois des origines à la fin des song.(Turnhout: Brepols Publishers)
- 2016 - (with A.C. Fang, eds) The Language and Iconography of Chinese Coin Charms: Deciphering a Past Belief System (Berlin and Heidelberg: Springer)
- 2014 - Le Trésor de Huê, Une face cachée de la colonisation de l'Indochine (Paris: Nouveau Monde éditions)
- 2014 - Monnaies chinoises, IV- Des Liao aux Ming du Sud (Paris: Bibliothèque nationale de France)
- 2013 - La Ruine du Qin, Ascension, triomphe et mort du premier empereur de Chine (Paris: La Librairie Vuibert)
- 2003 - Monnaies chinoises, II- Des Qin aux Cinq Dynasties (Paris: Bibliothèque nationale de France)
- 2002 - Catalogue des monnaies vietnamiennes- Supplément (Paris: Bibliothèque nationale de France)
- 2001 - (with M. Amandry, M. Dhénin, M. Popoff and C. Vellet) Dictionnaire de Numismatique (Paris: Larousse)
- 1997 - Monnaies chinoises, I- L'Antiquité préimpériale (Paris: Bibliothèque nationale de France)
- 1995 - Les monnaies chinoises de Pacifique Chardin (Lille)
- 1992 - Monnaies de Chine (Paris: Bibliothèque Nationale)
- 1988 - Catalogue des monnaies vietnamiennes (Paris: Bibliothèque nationale)
- 1987 - Amulettes de Chine et du Vietnam, rites magiques et symbolique de la Chine ancienne (Paris: Le Léopard d'or)
- 1986 - Monnaies d'Extrême Orient (Paris: Administration des monnaies et médailles)

Selected Articles

- 2011 - "The Confucian Message on Vietnamese Coins A closer look at the Nguyễn dynasty's large coins with moral maxims", Numismatic Chronicle 171, pp. 367–406.
- 2007 - "Identification of the Nguyên Thông Coins of the Cảnh Hirng Period (1740 -1786)", Numismatic Chronicle 167, pp. 237–241.
