= Surasky =

Surasky is a surname. Notable people with the surname include:

- Aharon Surasky (born 1940), Israeli writer
- Charles Surasky (fl. 1985–2003), American numismatist
- Chana Timoner (1951–1998), born Carol Ann Surasky, American rabbi
