= Lyce Jankowski =

Historian and Coin Collector

Lyce Jankowski (born 1982) is a numismatist, specialising in East Asia, and an art historian, specialising in Chinese material culture.

== Career ==
Jankowski graduated in Classics (Licence and Maitrise at the Université Paris-Sorbonne), in Chinese (Licence at the Institut National des Langues Orientales, Paris), in Antiquity (Magistère at the Ecole Normale Supérieure) and in Art History (Licence, Master and Doctorat at the Université Paris-Sorbonne).

Her studies of the contacts between Imperial Rome and Han China sparked an interest in numismatics. She studied Chinese numismatics with François Thierry (numismatist), curator of the Asian coin collection at the Bibliothèque Nationale de France (BnF); numismatics at the American Numismatic Society E. Newman seminar; Greek and Roman coinage in Paris with Olivier Picard and Michel Amandry; and Central Asian numismatics with Osmund Bopearachchi. For her PhD, she explored the social networks of coin collectors in 19th century China. The title was "Les cercles de collectionneurs et de numismates dans la région de Pékin durant la première moitié du XIXème siècle".

From 2014 to 2017 she was a fellow of Worcester College, University of Oxford, and Sackler Fellow at the Ashmolean Museum, where she curated the East Asian and subsequently adjunct professor in the Department of East Asian languages and civilizations.

In 2019, she became Curator of extra-European arts at the Musée royal de Mariemont, Belgium.

== Awards and honours ==
- 2024 - Awarded the Lhotka Prize for Chinese Numismatics - the world of Chinese money (co-authored with Helen Wang and François Thierry (numismatist))
- 2018 - Prix Flora Blanchon of the Académie des Inscriptions et Belles-Lettres
- 2014 - Quadriennal Prize of the Royal Numismatic Society of Belgium - awarded for her PhD.

== Publications ==
- Les Amis des monnaies - La sociabilité savante des collectionneurs et numismates chinois de la fin des Qing, Maisonneuve & Larose, 2018.
- "History of the Chinese collection at the American Numismatic Society", American Journal of Numismatics 30 (mars 2018).
- 美国钱币学会收藏中国钱币的历史,(译)张亚威、孟祥伟, 《中国钱币》2019年第11、12期.
- "Amulets and propitious coins in China", Historia Mundi, Jan 2016.
- "Short Introduction to Chinese Numismatics - A Bibliographical Approach", Historia Mundi, Nov 2014.
- "L'âge d'or de la numismatique en Chine : l'exemple du Catalogue des Monnaies Anciennes de Li Zuoxian", Proceedings of the XIVth international Numismatic Congress Glasgow 2009, vol. II, Glasgow 2011.
- "Wholesale collectibles:an example from “Kuhn & Komor, curio dealers in the East”, Beijing 2018.
