= Kaelyn McGregor =

American numismatist (1963–2007)

Kaelyn Ann McGregor (29 September 1963 – 21 April 2007) was a numismatist who specialized in the coinage of Salamis, Cyprus. She worked at the British Museum, the Royal Numismatic Society and Brown University.

== Career ==
Born in Anaheim, McGregor attended New York University, attended the American Numismatic Society Summer School in 1993, and received her Ph.D., titled “The Coinage of Salamis, Cyprus, from the Sixth to the Fourth Centuries” from University College London, 1999. While in London, she was employed by the British Museum and the Royal Numismatic Society, then became Director of Administration for Brown University's Office of the Vice President for Research.

== Legacy ==
The Kaelyn McGregor Numismatic Research Fund was established in her honor to provide resources for the analysis and curation of Brown's numismatic collections and support for Brown students of numismatics.
