= Howard Franklin Bowker =

- Born: January 3, 1899; Winona, Minnesota, U.S.
- Died: July 3, 1970 (aged 71); Oakland, California, U.S.
- Occupation: Philatelist

Howard Franklin Bowker (1889-1970) was a numismatist and philatelist, collecting and specialising in Chinese coins, stamps and banknotes. He created the first bibliography of Western language publications on East Asian numismatics.

== Family life ==
Howard Bowker was born on 3 January 1889 in Winona, Minnesota, the third of seven children. After graduating from the Crane High School (Chicago) in 1903, at the age of fourteen, he went to work at the Peoples Gas Light and Coke Company to help support the family. He married Violetta ("Letta") in 1912. They had three sons: Howard Franklin Bowker Jr (1914-1943), Gordon Albert Bowker (1917-1943), and Irving Allen Bowker (1922-1995). The first son was a Marine Corps Major; the second served in the US Navy; the third served in the US army. After retirement from the Navy, Bowker and his wife retired to Oakland, California. He died on 8 July 1970.

== Naval career ==
He joined the navy in October 1912, and served for 34 years, including both World War I and World War II, mostly in administration, usually associated with payroll. He served on board the USS Intrepid, USS Jupiter, USS Black Arrow, USS Newport News. He was stationed at the Cavite Navy Yard in the Philippines from 1921 to 1923, then assigned to the Naval Garrison at Hankow from May 1923, to April 1924. After this, he served on the USS Chaumont, USS Seattle and USS Procyon. After an assignment at the Naval Purchasing Office at San Francisco, he served on the USS Tennessee (1931), USS Saratoga (1931-1935), USS Medusa (1935). Between 1935 and 1937 he served at the naval stations at Yerba Buena and Mare Island, in the San Francisco area. In 1937 he left for Guam, serving on the USS Gold Star, and at the Naval Station Guam until June 1939. After Guam, he went to Brooklyn, NY, where he served on a receiving ship until 1941, thereafter serving on the USS Catlin, USS West Point and USS Whitney. From August 1943 to August 1944 he was assigned to the Naval Supply Depot at Oakland, California, and thereafter to the Brooklyn Navy Yard. His last service on board ship was on the USS Clytie. He retired from the Navy with the rank of Lieutenant Commander on 23 December 1945.

== Numismatic career ==
By 1910 Bowker was a self-proclaimed, self-employed coin dealer in the Chicago area. He became interested in Chinese coins while stationed in Hankow (1923-1924). He visited collections at the Smithsonian Institution, the American Numismatic Society, the University of Pennsylvania, and was an active member of the Numismatic Society of China, the Pacific Coast Numismatic Society, the American Numismatic Society, and the American Numismatic Association. His service with the Navy enabled him to collect both in the US and overseas, and to meet with collectors (e.g. Kalgan Shih, Eduard Kann). He curated a large exhibition of Chinese numismatic material at the California State Numismatic Society's show in Santa Rosa in 1951 (featuring pieces from his collection, the A.G. Adams collection, pieces borrowed from A.B. Coole and other collectors). In the mid-1950s he provided consulting services to the Smithsonian Institution, a position that became official in 1958.

== His collections ==
In his will, Bowker stipulated that his collections should go to the Smithsonian Institution. His philatelic collections are now part of the National Postal Museum in Washington, DC. Several unsuccessful attempts were made to transfer the numismatic collection to the Smithsonian, after which they went into storage and disappeared for 38 years. After Violetta's death in 1972, the collection passed to Bowker's son Irving, and on his death, to his widow Nancy. The collection was rediscovered by Michael Chou and Bruce W. Smith in 2007. Michael Chou, serving on behalf of the Bowker family, was engaged to contact museums in China. Chou bought Bowker's library of numismatic books and donated it to Bruce W. Smith. The following major donations from the Howard Franklin Bowker Collection have been made:

- 139 coins and dies to the Shanghai Mint Museum (16 April 2010). One of the four exhibition halls in the Shanghai Mint Museum is dedicated to the Bowker Collection.
- 212 banknotes to the China Banknote Printing and Minting Corporation (6 Sept 2010)
- 84 coins to the Shenyang Mint (13 May 2011)
- 37 coins to the Shanghai Mint Museum (23 March 2015)
- 6132 coins to the Kunstmuseum Moritzburg Halle (Saale) (May 2016)
- 24 coins to the Shanghai Mint (15 June 2016)
- a large collection to the National Numismatic Collection, Smithsonian National Museum of American History (2017)

Coins from the Bowker East Asian Collection were sold at auction on 23 August 2016.

== Publications ==
- A Numismatic Bibliography of the Far East (American Numismatic Society, 1943)

"This pioneering work recorded more than 900 books, articles and even auctions of East Asian coins and paper money, published in Western languages. [Bowker] was the first to record auction catalogs in an East Asian bibliography. Except for the auction catalogs, the entire work is arranged in a single, alphabetical listing by the author. But, going a step farther, Bowker added a notation indicating in which of more than a dozen listed libraries each work could be found. This is important because many of the books are rare or difficult to locate." - Bruce W. Smith

- Bibliography of Far Eastern Numismatology (co-authored with Arthur Braddon Coole and Hitoshi Kozono) (1967).

Bowker was also a regular contributor to several journals, including The China Journal, The Coin Collectors Journal, The Numismatist, Numismatic Bulletin, Calcoin News, Seaby's Coin & Medal Bulletin, The Far Eastern Quarterly, Numismatic Scrapbook Magazine, Pa Kua Bulletin, Spink's Numismatic Circular, China Clipper, (ANS) Museum Notes, Cash on the Line, Collectors Club Philatelist, The Stamp Specialist, and Essay Proof Journal.

== Biographies and obituaries ==
- "Howard Franklin Bowker, Sr", by Ron Guth, Bruce Smith, and the Bowker Grandchildren, in Journal of East Asian Numismatics (JEAN), no. 5, 2017, pp. 45–58.
- Obituary, Calcoin News (Fall 1970), p. 113.
- Obituary, China Clipper (Sept 1970), p. 109.
- Obituary, Coin World (29 July 1970), p. 1132.
- Obituary, Numismatic Scrapbook (Aug 1970), p. 1088.
- Obituary, The Numismatist (Sept 1970), p. 1263.
- Obituary, World Coins (Sept 1970), p. 1133.
