= Lhotka Prize =

Prize

The Lhotka Memorial Prize is a prize awarded to the author of a publication about numismatics which is considered most helpful to the elementary student of numismatics published in the previous two calendar years.

The prize was endowed in 1962 by Professor John Francis Lhotka Jr (University of Oklahoma) (1921–1993), an honorary fellow of the Royal Numismatic Society, in memory of his father, Dr John Francis Lhotka.

== Past winners ==
- 1963 Robert A.G. Carson (Coins, Ancient, Medieval and Modern, London, 1962)
- 1964 David R. Sear (Roman Coins and their Values, London, 1974)
- 1965 R.H. Michael Dolley (Anglo-Saxon Pennies, London, 1964) and J. Porteous (Coins, London, 1964)
- 1966 Howard W.A. Linecar (Beginner’s Guide to Coin Collecting, London, 1966)
- 1967 Philip D. Whitting (Coins in the Classroom, London, 1966)
- 1969 Anthony Dowle and Patrick Finn (The Guide Book to the Coinage of Ireland, London, 1969)
- 1970 M.J. Freeman (The Bronze Coinage of Great Britain, London, 1970)
- 1971 P.L. Gupta (Coins India: the Land and Peoples, New Delhi, 1969)
- 1972 J.R.S. Whiting (Commemorative Medals, Newton Abbot, 1972)
- 1973 G. Kenneth Jenkins (Ancient Greek Coins, New York, 1972)
- 1974 George Berry (English Medieval Jetons, London, 1974)
- 1975 Richard Plant (Arabic Coins and How to Read Them, London, 1973)
- 1976 W. Burger (Ching Cash until 1735, Taipei, 1976)
- 1978 John P.C. Kent (2000 Years of British Coins, London, 1978); A.M. Burnett (Coins of Roman Britain, London, 1977); I.A. Carradice (Ancient Greek Portrait Coins, London, 1978); and M.P. Jones (Medals of the French Revolution, London, 1977)
- 1979 Michael Mitchiner (Oriental Coins and their Values : the Ancient and Classical World, Sanderstead, 1977)
- 1980 John Casey (Coinage in Roman Britain, 1980)
- 1981 Martin J. Price (ed., Coins : an Illustrated Survey 650 BC to the Present Day, London, 1980)
- 1982 C. Bruce (The Standard Guide to South Asian Coins and Paper Money since 1556 AD, Iola, Wisc., 1981)
- 1983 J.O’D. Mays (The Splendid Shilling : a Social History of an Engaging Coin, Ringwood, 1982)
- 1984 E. Junge (World Coin Encyclopedia, London, 1984)
- 1985 Michael Broome (Handbook of Islamic Coins, London, 1985)
- 1986 Joe Cribb (ed. Money : from Cowrie shells to Credit Cards, London, 1986)
- 1987 Andrew M. Burnett (Coinage in the Roman World, London, 1987) and D. Nash (Coinage in the Celtic World, London, 1987)
- 1988 Martin J. Price and Ian A. Carradice (Coinage in the Greek World, London, 1988)
- 1989 John Casey and Richard Reece (eds, Coins and the Archaeologist, 2nd edn, London, 1988)
- 1990 Joe Cribb, Barry Cook and Ian A. Carradice (The Coin Atlas : the World of Coinage from its Origins to the Present Day, London, 1990)
- 1991 Edward M. Besly (Coins and Medals of the English Civil War, London, 1990) and A.M. Burnett (Interpreting the Past : Coins, London, 1991)
- 1992 Philip Attwood (Artistic Circles : the Medal in Britain 1880–1918, London, 1992) and the contributors to One Money for Europe
- 1993 Elizabeth Errington and Joe Cribb (The Crossroads of Asia, Cambridge, 1992)
- 1994 Jeffrey North (English Hammered Coinage I : Early Anglo-Saxon to Henry III, c.600–1272, 3rd edn, London, 1994)
- 1995 Virginia Hewitt (Beauty and the Banknote, London, 1994) and Christopher R. Wren (Illustrated Guides to Identification : series of three books on English Hammered Coins, 1992, 1993, 1995)
- 1996 Christopher Howgego (Ancient History from Coins, London, 1995)
- 1997 Edward Besly (Loose Change, Cardiff, 1997) and John Orna-Ornstein (The Story of Money, London, 1997)
- 1998 Richard G. Doty (America’s Money, America’s Story, Iola, Wisconsin, 1998)
- 1999 Nicholas Holmes (Scottish Coins : a History of Small Change in Scotland, Edinburgh, 1998) and Nicholas Mayhew (Sterling : the History of a Currency, London, 1999)
- 2000 David R. Sear (Roman Coins and their Values, Vol. 1, The Republic and The Twelve Caesars, 280 BC – AD 96, London, 2000)
- 2001 Ivan Buck (Medieval English Groats, Witham, 2000)
- 2002 Richard Abdy (Romano-British Coin Hoards, Princes Risborough, 2002)
- 2003 Philip Attwood (British Art Medals 1982–2002, London 2002)
- 2004 E. Colgan (For Want of Good Money: The Story of Ireland’s Coinage, Bray, Co. Wicklow, 2003)
- 2005 David Hartill (Cast Chinese Coins, Crewe, 2005)
- 2006 Paul and Bente Withers (The Galata Guide to the Pennies of Edward I and II, Llanfyllin, 2006)
- 2007 Eurydice Georganteli and Barrie Cook (Encounters. Travel and Money in the Byzantine World, D. Giles Ltd London)
- 2011 Bente and Paul Withers (The Token Book, Llanfyllin, 2010)
- 2013 David Hartill (Early Japanese Coins, Sandy, Beds, 2011)
- 2013 Amelia Dowler and Richard Abdy (Coins and the Bible, 2013); Sam Moorhead (A history of Roman coinage in riltain: illustrated by finds recorded with the Portable Antiquities Scheme, 2013)
- 2014 Elizabeth Cottam and Chris Rudd (Britain’s First Coins, 2013); Michael Cuddleford (Coin Finds in Britain: A Collector’s Guide, 2013)
- 2015 Richard Kelleher (A History of Medieval Coinage in England, 2015)
- 2016 Eleanor Ghey (Hoards: Hidden Histories, 2015)
- 2018 Dario Calomino, (Defacing The Past – Damnation and Desecration in Imperial Rome, 2016), and Peter Thonemann, The Hellenistic World: Using Coins as Sources (Guides to the Coinage of the Ancient World, 2016)
- 2019 Clare Rowan (From Caesar to Augustus (c. 49 BC-AD 14): Using Coins as Sources, Cambridge, 2018)
- 2023 Lia Yarrow (The Roman Republic to 49 BCE: Using Coins as Sources) (Cambridge, 2021)
- 2024 Helen Wang, François Thierry (numismatist) and Lyce Jankowski (Chinese Numismatics: the World of Chinese Money, London, 2022)
