= Fussman =

Fussman, Fußmann is a German surname. Notable people with the surname include:

- Cal Fussman, American writer
- Gérard Fussman (1940–2022), French Indologist
- Klaus Fußmann (born 1938), German painter
