= Philip Grierson =

British academic and numismatist

- Born: 15 November 1910; Dublin, British Empire
- Died: 15 January 2006 (aged 95)
- Parent(s): Philip Grierson; Roberta Jane

Philip Grierson, FSA, FBA (15 November 1910 – 15 January 2006) was a British historian and numismatist. He was Professor of Numismatics at Cambridge University and a fellow of Gonville and Caius College for over seventy years. During his long and extremely prolific academic career, he built the world's foremost representative collection of medieval coins, wrote very extensively on the subject, brought it to much wider attention in the historical community and filled important curatorial and teaching posts in Cambridge, Brussels and Washington DC.

== Early life and education ==
Grierson was born in Dublin to Philip Henry Grierson and Roberta Ellen (Jane) Grierson. He had two sisters, Janet and Aileen Grierson. His father was a land surveyor and member of the Irish Land Commission who, after losing his job in 1906, ran a small farm at Clondalkin, near Dublin. There he gained a reputation for financial acumen, and was appointed to the boards of a number of companies. Grierson's father also built up an important collection of freshwater snails, which now resides at the Ulster Museum in Belfast.

Grierson was educated at Marlborough College, where he specialised in natural sciences. As a result, he was admitted to read medicine at Gonville and Caius College, Cambridge, in 1929. Almost immediately, he switched to history, and was to remain with the latter subject for the rest of his life. However, his early interest in the sciences left him with a sound knowledge of the methods and principles of metallurgy, mathematics, statistics and much more besides that would prove valuable in later years.

Grierson's performance as a student was exceptional. Graduating with a double first, he took the Lightfoot Scholarship from the university and also won the Schuldham Plate, his college's highest academic accolade for students. He began post-graduate studies in 1932 on the subject of Carolingian history, and his first publications were to be on the ecclesiastical history of the Early Middle Ages.

== Academic career ==
After being offered a fellowship at Gonville and Caius College, Cambridge in 1934, he saw no need to submit his PhD research; he received an honorary PhD from the university in 1971. Grierson went on to hold a number of important posts in college: he was college librarian from 1944 to 1969, and president (second in line to the master) from 1966 to 1976. He remained an active member of the fellowship, and was present at the interview for the master who would be sworn in shortly after Grierson's own death.

Grierson also had teaching responsibilities within the Faculty of History, University of Cambridge, which appointed him assistant lecturer in 1938 and full lecturer in 1945. He became reader in numismatics in 1959, and made Professor of Numismatics in 1971. He came to share and later lead teaching on the general introduction to European history, running through the history of continental Europe from the fifth to the fifteenth century.

Grierson's academic career eventually spread beyond Cambridge when, in 1947, he was invited to take up the vacant, part-time chair of numismatics at Brussels, which he held in addition to his Cambridge posts until his retirement in 1981. Grierson spent parts of the Easter and Christmas vacation in Brussels every year, along with more occasional visits. For many years already Grierson's interests had encompassed the medieval Low Countries, and he had a number of friends in Belgium, not least the great Carolingian scholar François-Louis Ganshof.

Work in the United States began in 1953, when Grierson was one of the founding instructors at the American Numismatic Society's annual summer school. He returned the following year, and in 1955 was invited to become honorary adviser and curator at the Dumbarton Oaks Research Library and Collection in Washington DC, managed by the trustees of Harvard University. His brief was to use the centre's considerable resources to build up the world's finest collection of Byzantine coinage and publish it – a task which, by the time he left the post in 1997, he had completed admirably (despite once accidentally dropping a tray of gold coins down a lift shaft). The Catalogue of Byzantine Coins in the Dumbarton Oaks Collection and in the Whittemore Collection remains the standard reference work for Byzantine coinage. At the height of his productivity, therefore, Grierson would spend the Michaelmas, Lent and Easter terms each year in Cambridge, Christmas and Easter in Brussels and two months of the summer vacation in Washington and at Cornell University.

Outside of university, he served as director of the Royal Historical Society (1945–1955), and president of the Royal Numismatic Society (1961–1966). He gave the Ford Lectures at Oxford during the 1956-1957 academic year. He was elected Fellow of the Society of Antiquaries of London (FSA) in 1949, and as a Fellow of the British Academy in 1958. He was also a member of the Italian Numismatic Society. He was awarded the medal of the Royal Numismatic Society in 1958.

=== Fitzwilliam Museum ===
Grierson's growing interest in numismatics soon brought him into contact with the coin room at the Fitzwilliam Museum, and he was appointed Honorary Keeper of the Department of Coins and Medals in 1949, and served as a syndic of the museum until 1958. Under his influence, the department of coins and medals in the Fitzwilliam became one of the most active and productive research departments in the museum. It contains a room named in his honour, which houses Philip's collection. He remained an almost daily visitor to the coin room, adding new specimens to his collection and meeting visitors, until very shortly before his death. The following Keeper of Coins and Medals, Mark Blackburn, first came to the department in 1982 as part of the Medieval European Coinage project to publish Philip's burgeoning collection.

== Coin collection ==
It was pure chance that first drew Grierson's attention to numismatics. A visit to the family home at Christmas 1944 or shortly thereafter produced a bronze Byzantine coin from one of his father's desk drawers. It was later identified as an issue in the name of the emperor Phocas, and inspired Grierson to visit Spink's in London. There, he expressed no intention of ever becoming a serious collector, and wished only to purchase £5 of coins to serve as illustrative material in his lectures.

These good intentions did not last, and by the end of the next year he had 1,500 coins, and 3,500 by the end of 1946. Eventually his collection was to include over 20,000 specimens, worth several million pounds as a whole. It is the finest representative collection for medieval Europe in the world. Although it resided in the Fitzwilliam Museum for many years, his collection only passed to the museum upon his death, and was retained in his own name so as to facilitate the selling of old specimens and the purchase of superior ones.

Grierson was never especially wealthy, and only built the collection by spending most of his modest inheritance and two-thirds of his annual income as an academic on coins. It helped that he started collecting at a time when the London numismatic dealers were awash with material from the enormous collection of Lord Grantley. Wartime and post-war conditions meant that these coins were available at a fraction of their pre-war (and equivalent modern) price, with heavy restrictions on the activities of foreign purchasers. Grierson was a careful buyer, but could also be willing to spend significant amounts for particular coins, such as his famous and exceptionally rare portrait denier of Charlemagne. Later appointments to additional positions helped further his collection.

In 1982, Grierson arranged funding to begin a project aimed at publishing his (now very substantial) collection. Medieval European Coinage was initially envisaged as twelve volumes of definitive catalogue and text on the coinage of different parts of Europe. The first volume appeared in 1986, and discussed the coinage of all of western Europe up to the tenth century. It remains the standard catalogue and study of the period.

== Personal life ==
Despite his prodigious volume of publications and onerous academic duties, Grierson was extremely sociable. He moved into St Michael's Court in the 1930s, and occupied the same set of rooms overlooking the Market Square in Cambridge after an interlude during World War 2, when they were used by the Ministry of Agriculture, Fisheries and Food. These rooms remained a hub of activity in college, constantly receiving visitors. Although he never married, Grierson had a great many friends in Cambridge and elsewhere, and would host sherry parties at the beginning of each year.

During his time away from study, the cinema was one of Grierson's greatest interests. Evenings with friends in his later years would often begin with pizza (either at Pizza Express on Jesus Lane or, in summer, at Don Pasquale in the Market Square) and end with a movie in his rooms. As an undergraduate, he was secretary of the university's film society, and was such a regular cinema-goer that in the 1930s one local newspaper commented that the opening of an eighth cinema in Cambridge would give 'Mr Grierson of Caius the chance to visit a different cinema every day, and two on Sunday'. With the advent of video, he began to build up a collection of films in his rooms, which eventually included 2,000 items on video and DVD. Most had notes attached bearing Grierson's scathing initial thoughts jotted down after watching. Grierson's cinematic and literary tastes always inclined towards the exciting and adventurous: science fiction and horror were among his favourites.

As a student and young fellow, Grierson had a great interest in and admiration for the Soviet Union, which led him to spend a summer touring it with a friend in 1932. Subsequently, he published a bibliography of literature on the Soviet Union down to 1942, which he updated annually until 1950. Grierson's distaste with fascist régimes manifested itself in a refusal to visit Spain under Francisco Franco, and also in a visit to Germany in 1938 to aid the release of two Jewish academics. They were the father and father-in-law of David Daube, a friend of Philip and subsequently regius professor of civil law at Oxford. After being rounded up in Kristallnacht (9 November 1938 – 10 November 1938) they had been sent to the Dachau concentration camp. Once Grierson and some friends had been alerted to the situation by Daube they moved very fast, obtaining a visa to visit Germany on 14 November and papers for the release under British visa of Daube's relatives expedited by the MP for Cambridge University. After flying to Frankfurt on 18 November, Grierson arranged the release of Daube's relatives on 20 and 26 November, and travelled with them back to England.

Grierson's wartime experiences were relatively peaceful. Poor eyesight and a childhood injury left him unfit for military service, and despite being interviewed he was rejected from the Ultra codebreaking enterprise at Bletchley Park because his German was not strong enough. Instead, he remained in Cambridge as part of the reduced history faculty.

Throughout his life, Grierson remained active and relatively healthy. He played squash regularly until the age of 80, and enjoyed telling stories of how he had climbed Mount Etna in Sicily during its 1949 eruption. Physical challenges appealed to him, such as when on one occasion in 1932 or 1933 he walked home from London one evening – a distance of some forty-four miles – and arrived the following lunchtime. The evening, he was sworn in as fellow of Gonville and Caius in 1935 happened to coincide with an important family party in Dublin the next evening. Grierson was not deterred, and arranged for a friend to fly him from Cambridge to Rugby after leaving dinner at the earliest possible moment. At Rugby, he caught the post train for Holyhead, and after catching a ferry the following morning made it to Dublin in plenty of time for his party. Grierson learned to fly himself in his 20s, but never learned to drive.

== Selected publications ==
- [with L. Travaini] Medieval European Coinage, vol. 14: Italy (3). South Italy, Sicily, Sardinia (Cambridge, 1998)
- Coins of Medieval Europe (London, 1991)
- [with M. A. S. Blackburn] Medieval European Coinage, vol. 1: the Early Middle Ages (5th–10th Centuries) (Cambridge, 1986)
- Byzantine Coinage (London and Berkeley, CA, 1982)
- Bibliographie numismatique, 2nd ed. (Brussels, 1979)
- Dark Age Numismatics: Selected Studies (London, 1979) [collected papers]
- Later Medieval Numismatics (11th–16th centuries) (London, 1979) [collected papers]
- Monnaies du Moyen Âge (Fribourg, 1976)
- Numismatics (Oxford, 1975)
- [with A. R. Bellinger et al.] Catalogue of the Byzantine coins in the Dumbarton Oaks Collection and in the Whittemore Collection, 9 vols. (Washington DC, 1966–99)
- Books on Soviet Russia 1917–42: a Bibliography and a Guide to Reading (London, 1943)
