= Numismatist =

Person studying or collecting currencies, coins or paper money

A numismatist is a specialist, researcher, and/or well-informed collector of numismatics/coins ("of coins"; from Late Latin numismatis, genitive of numisma). Numismatists can include collectors, specialist dealers, and scholar-researchers who use coins (and possibly, other currency) in object-based research. Although use of the term numismatics was first recorded in English in 1799, people had been collecting and studying coins long before then all over the world. The branch of numismatics that deals with the study and collection of paper currency and banknotes is called notaphily.

== Different kinds of numismatist ==
There are firstly simple collectors, who solely derive pleasure from collecting coins. However, there are also coin dealers, or professional numismatists, who authenticate or grade coins for commercial purposes. The buying and selling of coin collections by numismatists who are professional dealers advances the study of money, and expert numismatists are consulted by historians, museum curators, and archaeologists. See, for example, the International Association of Professional Numismatists (IAPN) and the British Numismatic Trade Association (BNTA). There are also scholar numismatists or numismatic researchers working in public collections, universities or as independent scholars acquiring knowledge about monetary devices, their systems, their economy and their historical context. Coins are especially relevant as a source in the pre-modern period, with the likenesses of many ancient and medieval monarchs being known to us only through their depictions on coins. Examples of these different kinds of numismatist include Walter Breen, a noted numismatist who was not an avid collector, and King Farouk I of Egypt, an avid collector who had very little interest in numismatics. Harry Bass by comparison was a noted collector who was also a numismatist.

== Training and recognition ==
There are very few academic institutions around the world that offer formal training in numismatics. Some may offer numismatics as part of a course in classical studies, ancient history, history or archaeology. Scholar numismatists may focus on numismatics at the postgraduate level, where the training is more research-based. As a result, most scholar numismatists will approach numismatics from within another academic discipline (e.g. history, archaeology, ancient or modern languages, metal sciences), perhaps after attending a numismatic summer school, usually based where there is an excellent coin collection. Recognition of scholarly numismatic expertise may be in the form of a postgraduate qualification, and/or in the form of a medal awarded by a numismatic society: for example, the Medal of the Royal Numismatic Society, which may be awarded to scholar numismatists of any nationality.

Numismatic institutes

- The Institute for Numismatics and History of Money Vienna (Austria)
- Indian Institute for Research in Numismatic Studies, Nasik (India)
- International Centre for Numismatic Studies, Naples (Italy)

Numismatic summer schools

- American Numismatic Association Summer Seminar
- American Numismatic Society
- British Museum
- Radboud University Nijmegen (RU) and the Netherlands Institute at Athens (NIA) Summer School

== Selected numismatic organizations ==
- American Numismatic Association
- American Numismatic Society
- Asociación Numismática Española (Spanish Numismatic Society)
- Australian Numismatic Society
- British Art Medal Society
- British Association of Numismatic Societies
- British Numismatic Society
- International Bank Note Society
- International Numismatic Council organises the International Numismatic Congress, and publishes the Survey of Numismatic Research.
- Israel Numismatic Society
- Koninklijk Nederlands Genootschap voor Munt- en Penningkunde (Royal Dutch Numismatic Society)
- Money and Medals Network (UK)
- Numismatic Association of Australia
- Numismatische Gesellschaft zu Berlin (Berlin Numismatic Society)
- Oriental Numismatic Society
- Österreichische Numismatische Gesellschaft (Austrian Numismatic Society)
- Royal Numismatic Society (UK)
- Schweizerische Numismatische Gesellschaft/Société Suisse de Numismatique/Società Svizzera di Numismatica/Swiss Numismatic Society
- Società Numismatica Italiana (Italian Numismatic Society)
- Royal Numismatic Society of Belgium (Société Royale de Numismatique de Belgique)
- Société française de numismatique (French Numismatic Society)
- Svenska Numismatiska Föreningen (Swedish Numismatic Society)

== Biographical resources ==
As scholar numismatists work on coins (and related objects) within their particular area of interest (e.g. a particular part of the world, a particular period of history, or a particular culture), they are often known in those fields, as well as in numismatics. Biographical resources relating specifically to numismatists include the following:

- Manville, H.E., Biographical Dictionary of British and Irish Numismatics, Encyclopaedia of British Numismatics. Volume IV (London, 2009)
- Smith, Pete:, American Numismatic Biographies (1992).
- "Numismatic Who's Who", in Coins Weekly.
- de Callataÿ, F., Portraits of Famous Numismatists who died before 1800
- de Callataÿ, F., Portraits of Famous Numismatists who died after 1800
- Famous Numismatists - Les grands numismates, on the International Numismatic Council webpage
- Encyclopedic Dictionary of Numismatic Biographies - focus on American numismatists
- Numismatics - Biographical Information, on The E-Sylum

== List of scholar numismatists ==
- Richard Abdy
- Mikhail Abramzon
- Carmen Alfaro Asins (1952–2005)
- Andreas Alföldi (1895–1981)
- R. Alföldi
- Martin Allen (numismatist)
- Michael Alram
- Michel Amandry
- Augusto Carlos Teixeira de Aragão
- Marion Archibald (1935–2016)
- Carmen Arnold-Biucchi
- Ermanno A Arslan
- Simone Assemani (1752–1820)
- Philip Attwood
- Ernest Babelon (1854–1924)
- Churchill Babington
- Soheir Bakhoum
- Paul Balog
- Anselmo Banduri
- Jean-Jacques Barthélemy Garde du Cabinet du roi (1754–1795)
- Pierre Bastien (1912–2010)
- Georges Bataille
- Khadijeh (Zohrer) Baseri
- G. Belloni
- Peter Berghaus (1919–2012)
- Jacob de Bie
- Mark Blackburn (1953–2011)
- Roger Bland
- Osmund Bopearachchi
- Bartolomeo Borghesi
- Howard Franklin Bowker
- Robert Bracey
- Pierre-Napoléon Breton
- Agnes Baldwin Brett
- Andrew Brown
- Guido Bruck
- Patrick Bruun
- Guillaume Budé
- Andrew Burnett
- Aleksander Bursche
- Kevin Butcher
- Herbert A. Cahn (1915–2002)
- Mando Caramessini-Oeconomides (1927–2015)
- Dario Calomino
- Ian Carradice
- Francesco Carelli
- Robert Carson (1918–2006)
- Karel Castelin
- Gabriele Lancillotto Castelli (1727–1792)
- Celestino Cavedoni
- Secondina Lorenza Cesano (1879–1973)
- Elvira Clain-Stefanelli (1914–2001)
- Joan Clarke
- Henry Cohen
- Barrie Cook (numismatist)
- Esprit-Marie Cousinéry (1747–1833).
- Michael Crawford
- Joe Cribb
- Sylvester Sage Crosby (1831–1914)
- M. Crusafont i Sabater
- Vesta Sarkhosh Curtis
- Hermann Dannenberg (1824–1905)
- François de Callatay
- Elena Abramovna Davidovich
- G. Demski
- Georges Depeyrot
- Almudena Domínguez Arranz
- Amelia Dowler
- Théophile Marion Dumersan
- Joseph Hilarius Eckhel (1737–1798)
- Stephan Ladislaus Endlicher
- Elizabeth Errington
- Warren Esty
- Helen Farquhar
- Giuseppe Fiorelli
- Martin Folkes
- Julius Friedländer
- Nina Andreevna Frolova (1936–2015)
- Andrea Fulvio
- Raffaele Garrucci
- H.U. Geiger
- A. Geiser
- Girish Chandra
- Shpresa Gjongecaj
- Francesco Gnecchi
- Giovanni Gorini
- Michael Grant (1914–2004)
- Philip Grierson (1910–2006)
- Claude Gros de Boze
- P.L. Gupta (Parmeshwari Lal Gupta) (1914–2001)
- Tony Hackens
- Wolfgang Hahn
- Nicola Francesco Haym (1678–1729)
- Barclay Vincent Head (1844–1914)
- Stefan Heidemann
- David Hendin
- George Hill (1867–1948)
- Thomas Hockenhull
- Chris Howgego
- Octavian Iliescu (1919–2009)
- Lutz Ilisch
- Peter Ilisch
- Friedrich Imhoof-Blumer (1838–1920)
- Josèphe Jacquiot
- Lyce Jankowski
- Kenneth Jenkins (1918–2005)
- A. Johnston
- Mark Jones (museum director)
- Hans-Jörg Kellner (1920–2015)
- John Kent (1928–2000)
- Ryszard Kiersnowski (1925–2006)
- Ulrich Klein
- Eva Kolníková
- Koray Konuk
- Andrzej Kunisz
- Jean Lafaurie (1914–2008)
- Georges Le Rider (1928–2014)
- Ivar Leimus
- Nicholas Lowick
- George MacDonald (1862–1940)
- Dorota Malarczyk
- Brita Malmer (1925–2013)
- Harold Mattingly
- Nicholas Mayhew
- Kaelyn McGregor (1963-2007)
- Andrew Meadows
- Tony Merson (1950–2016)
- Ya'akov Meshorer (1935–2004)
- Michael Metcalf
- William Metcalf
- Vincenco Mirabella (1570–1624)
- Jens-Christian Moesgaard
- Theodor Mommsen
- T. Sam N. Moorhead
- Cécile Morrisson
- Nikola Moushmov
- B. N. Mukherjee (1932–2013)
- A. K. Narain (1925–2013)
- Edward T. Newell
- Eric P. Newman
- Rosa Norström
- Ernest Oberlaender
- Carlo Ottavio, Count Castiglione
- Bernhard Overbeck (1942–2018)
- Filippo Paruta (–1629)
- Vasiliki Penna (1951–2018)
- Pippa Pearce
- Elizabeth Pirie
- Arent Pol
- Adrian Popescu
- Achilles Postolacca (1821–1897)
- Vsevolod M. Potin (1918–2005)
- Constantin Preda (1925–2008)
- Martin Price (numismatist)
- P.P. Ripolles
- Louis Robert
- Anne Strachan Robertson (1910–1997)
- Desiré-Raoul Rochette
- A. Rovelli
- Joaquín Rubio y Muñoz
- Eduard Rüppell
- Andrea Saccoci
- Simone Scheers
- Gustave Schlumberger
- Edith Schönert-Geiß
- Jirí Sejbal (1929–2004)
- Charles Seltman
- Camillo Serafini
- Jules Silvestre (1841–1918)
- Adolf Soetbeer
- Dmitry Sontsov
- Frederic Soret
- Attilo Stazio (1923–2010)
- Johann Gustav Stickel
- Stanislaw Suchodolski
- Charles Surasky
- Ioannis Svoronos (1863–1922)
- Francois Thierry (numismatist)
- Rudi Thomsen (1918–2004)
- Ioannis Touratsoglou
- Victor Tourneur
- Lucia Travaini
- Oluf Gerhard Tychsen
- David Vagi
- Leandre Villaronga i Garriga (1919–2015)
- Johan van Heesch
- Dorothy B. Waage
- Helen Wang
- Raymond Weiller
- David Wigg-Wolf
- Gareth Williams
- Yordanka Youroukova
- Benedikt Zaech
- Jörgen Zoega
- Mohit Kapoor
- Alexander Nikolaevich Zograf

== See also ==
- List of coin collectors
