= Bimaran =

Locality near Jalalabad, Afghanistan

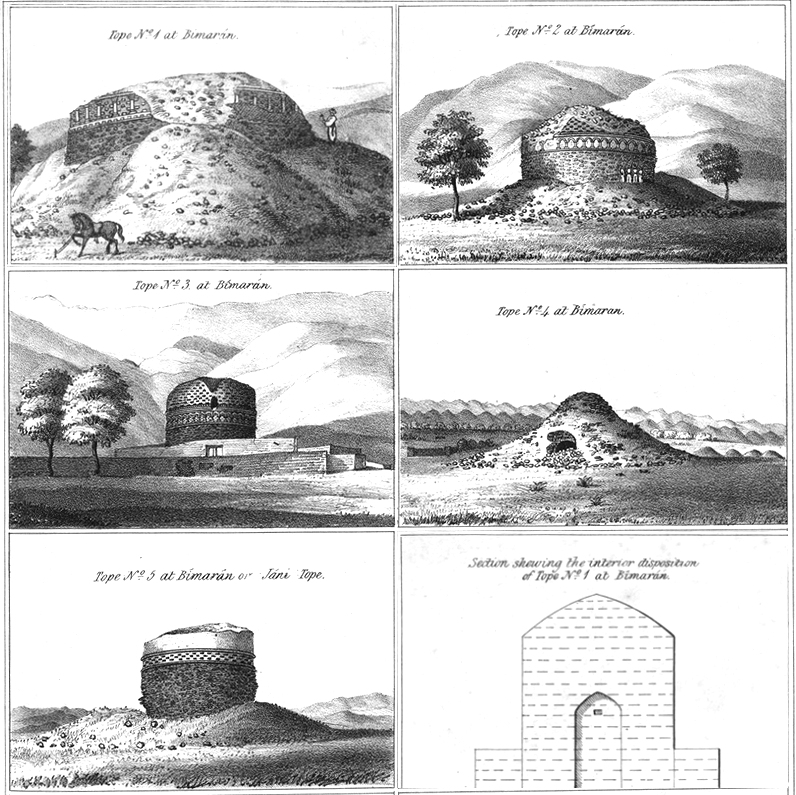
- Remains of Stupas 1, 2, 3, 4, and 5 at Bimaran in 1841. Drawings by Charles Masson.

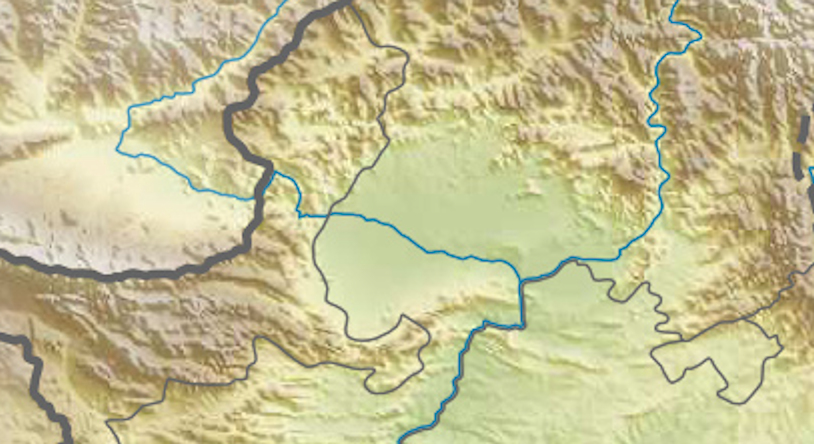
- Location within Afghanistan Location within Gandhara Location within South Asia
- 34.47°N 70.35°E
- Type: Stupa

Bimaran is a locality, 11 km west of Jalalabad in Afghanistan.

It is well known for the discovery of the Bimaran casket in one of the stupas (stupa Nb 2) located at Bimaran.

Altogether five ancient stupas are known in Bimaran, all dating to the 1st century BCE-1st century CE:

- Stupa No1: 34.454155°N 70.354553°E, in the fields southeast of the Bimaran village. It has a circumference of 38.40 meters.
- Stupa No2: 34.456668°N 70.347405°E, in the Bimaran village. It has a circumference of 43.90 meters.
- Stupa No3: 34.459454°N 70.347074°E, in the Bimaran village. It has a circumference of 33 meters.
- Stupa No4: 34.459472°N 70.346067°E, in the Bimaran village. It has a circumference of 43.9 meters.

Nearby is:

- Passani Stupa No1: 34.455333°N 70.343820°E
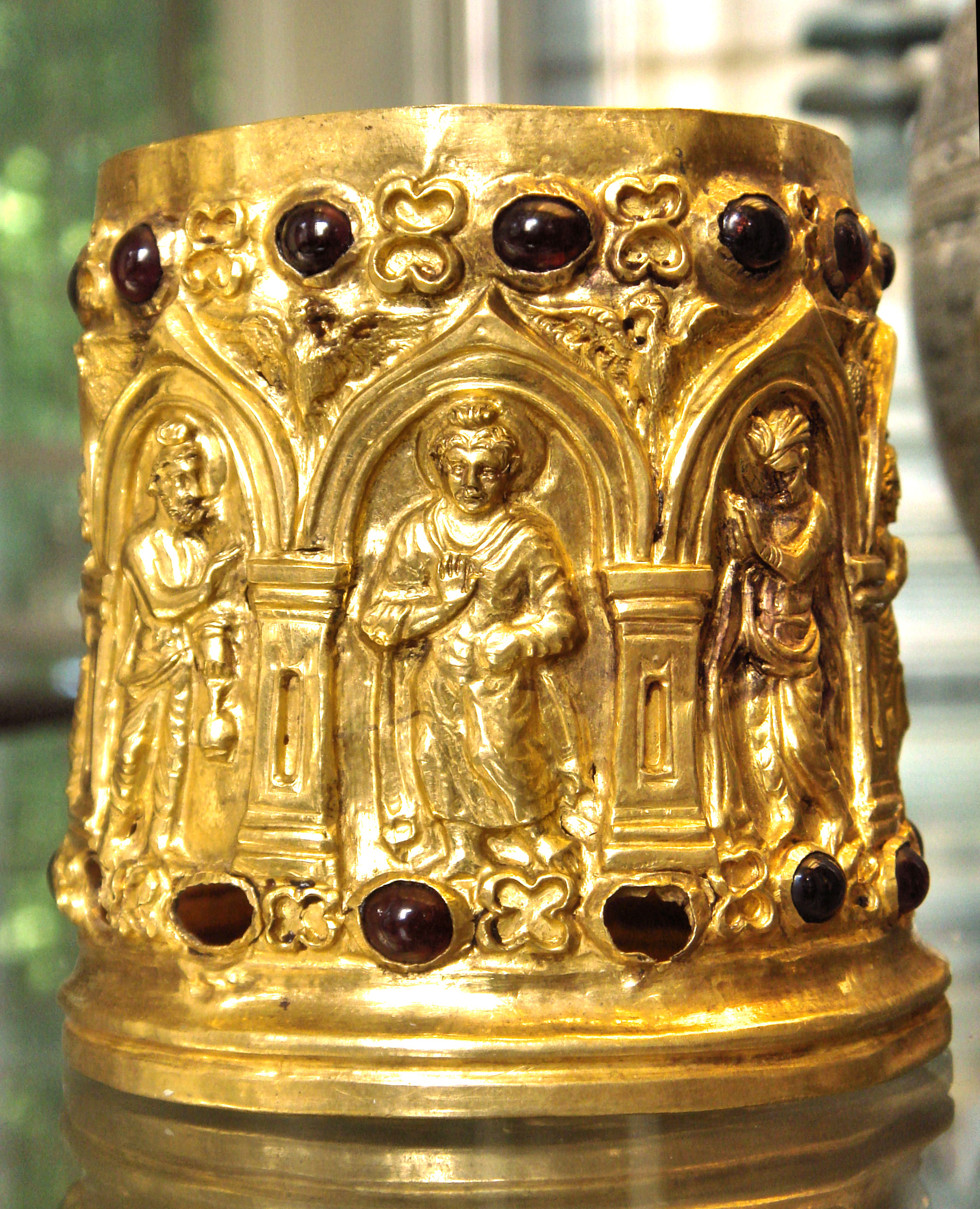
The Bimaran casket

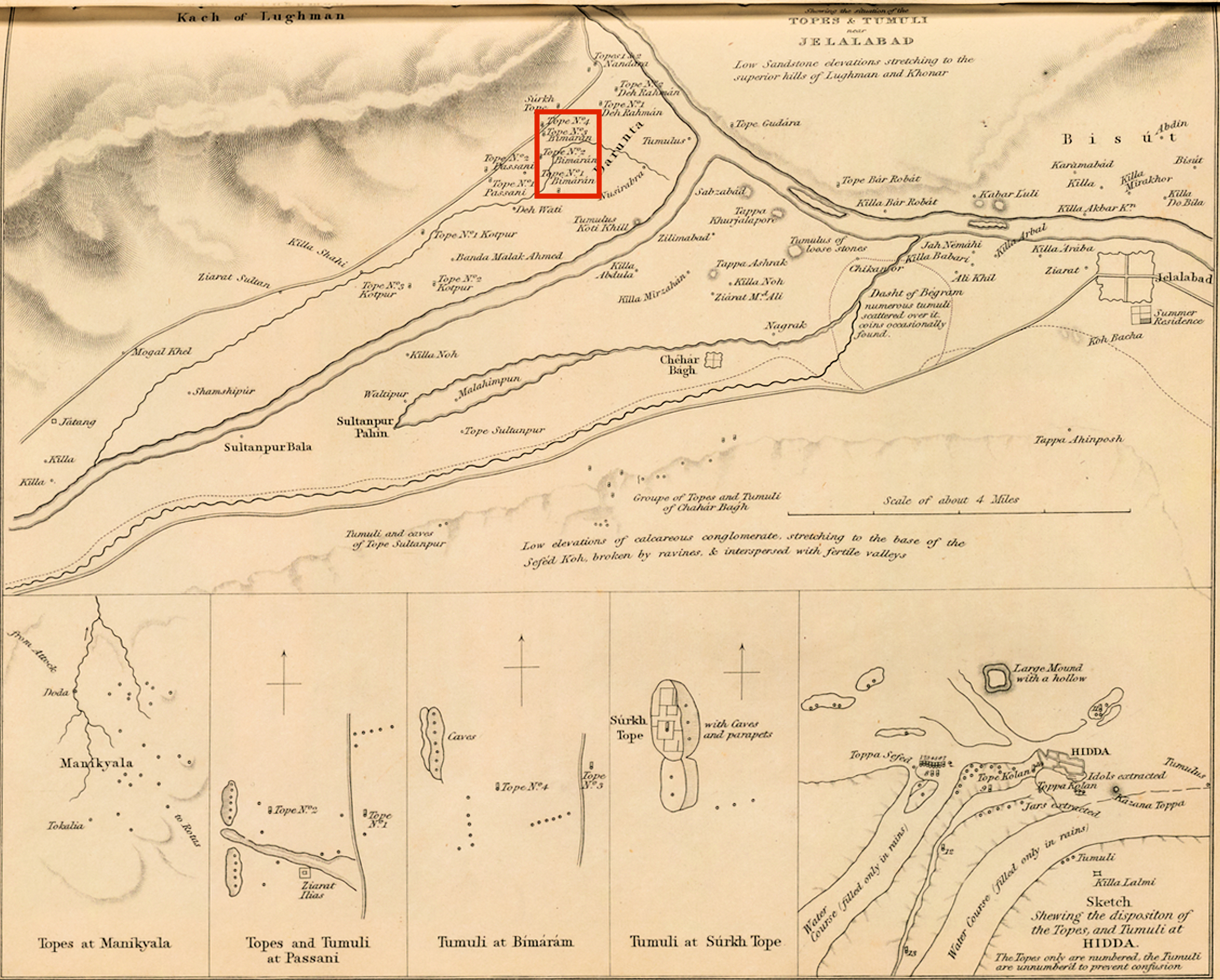
Stupas around Jelalabad, Bimaran area highlighted

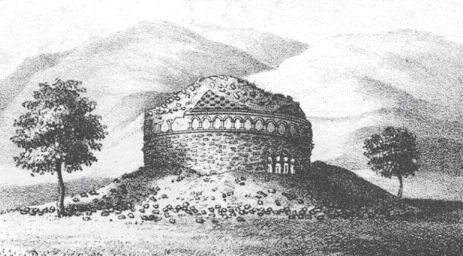
The Stupa Nb.2 at Bimaran, where the Bimaran casket was excavated. Drawing by Charles Masson.
