= Tony Merson =

British numismatist and philatelist

- Born: 22 May 1950
- Died: 24 December 2016 (aged 66)

Robert Anthony Merson (1950–2016) was a British numismatist and philatelist, with a particular interest in the coins of medieval France.

== Life ==
Robert Anthony Merson F.C.A. was born on 22 May 1950. He attended Farnham Grammar School, 1961–1968. He was an accountant by profession, but is better known for his contribution to numismatics and philately. He was an active member of numismatic and philatelic communities, and a member of several specialist learned societies, including the British Numismatic Society (from 1970, silver membership medal, 1970), the Royal Numismatic Society (from 1973, Honorary Fellow from 1999), the Société française de numismatique, and was chairman and honorary treasurer of the Surrey Postal History Group. He was particularly knowledgeable about medieval French coins, and made a significant contribution to the study of the gros tournois (published in The Gros Tournois, Oxford 1997). He died on 24 December 2016.

== Publications ==
Abbreviations: BNJ = British Numismatic Journal (British Numismatic Society) // BSFN = Bulletin de la Société française de Numismatique // NC = Numismatic Chronicle (Royal Numismatic Society) // NCirc = Numismatic Circular (Spink & Son Ltd) // SCMB = Seaby's Coin & Medal Bulletin, Seaby Coin & Medal Bulletin (B. A. Seaby Ltd)

- 1971a Exhibitions: ‘Le Trésor des Pirates’, a series of uniface reproductions..., BNJ 40 (1971), 192.
- 1972a Exhibitions: ‘Anglo-Gallic…’; ‘Britanny [i.e. Brittany]…’, BNJ 41 (1972), 207.
- 1974a Exhibitions: ‘French feudal coins attributed to Nicholas Briot’, BNJ 44 (1974), 94.
- 1974b ‘The Crondall hoard, 1828’, Quarterly Newsletter—Farnham Museum Society, 3 no. 9 (March 1974), 17–20; see also 1977f.
- 1974c ‘A preliminary note on the Farnham seventeenth-century traders’ tokens’, Quarterly Newsletter—Farnham Museum Society, 3 no. 10 (June 1974), 18–19.
- 1974d ‘Neatham –a link with Rome: the restoration of the Temple of Divus Augustus’, ibid. 20-21: illus.
- 1975a Exhibitions: ‘Twelve jettons…’, BNJ 45 (1975), 112.
- 1975b Exhibitions: ‘Reproduction of a medal struck… France in 1451’, BNJ 45 (1975), 115.
- 1975c ‘A curious aspect of monetary history: the use of Roman coins in later ages’, SCMB no. 680 (April 1975), 115–17.
- 1975d ‘Noah’s Ark on coins’, SCMB no. 679 (March 1975), 77–78. See also 1976a.
- 1975e ‘Un gros de Jean IV de Bretagne’, BSFN 30 no. 9 (Nov. 1975), 837 fig. B, 839–40.
- 1975f ‘Emissions de liards sous Louis XIV’, BSFN 30 no. 9 (Nov. 1975), 840–41.
- 1976a ‘More Noah’s Arks on coins’, SCMB no. 690 (Feb. 1976), 45–46. Cf. 1975d.
- 1976b [A find of clippings in Farnham Park], Farnham Herald, 25 June 1976. [See also 1977d, 1979a].
- 1976c ‘John Pinkerton’, SCMB no. 699 (Nov. 1976), 421–23.
- 1976d ‘Local numismatics [of Farnham]’, SCMB no. 700 (Dec. 1976), 470-74: illus.
- 1977a-b Exhibitions: ‘Two medals, 1. By Paget, 1928; 2. Possibly by P. Metcalfe, 1930’, BNJ 47 (1977), 160.
- 1977c ‘Two groats of Edward III with altered dies’, BNJ 47 (1977), 159–60.
- 1977d ‘Farnham, Surrey, England, 1976’, Coin Hoards 3 (1977), 134, no. 346. [See also 1976b, 1979a].
- 1977e [1625 list of documents in the Bailiffs’ Accounts], Quarterly Newsletter—Farnham & District Museum Society, 4 no. 10 (June 1977), p. 193.
- 1977f ‘The Crondall hoard—1828’, SCMB no. 705 (May 1977), 173–7; reprinted from 1974b with an appendix.
- 1977g-h ‘Plus ça change’, SCMB no. 711 (Nov. 1977), 388–90; no. 712 (Dec. 1977), 424–25.
- 1978a Exhibitions: ‘A medallion of Sir Isaac Newton’, BNJ 48 (1978), 143.
- 1978b ‘The coinage of France in the Middle Ages’, Newsletter—London Numismatic Club, 6 no. 14 (July 1978), 305–11.
- 1978c-d ‘"Wellington’s mint": coinage and the Peninsular War’, SCMB no. 721 (Sep. 1978), 272–74; no. 722 (Oct. 1978), 302–05.
- 1979a-b ‘A small hoard of clippings from Farnham Park, [and], Alderwasley, Derbys.’, BNJ 49 (1979), 127–28. [See also 1976b, 1977d].
- 1979c ‘A Tudor brass on the tomb of an auditor…’, BNJ 49 (1979), 140.
- 1979d Exhibitions: ‘The 25th Anniversary medal of Southampton Numismatic Society’, BNJ 49 (1979), 141.
- 1979e ‘Farnham, Middle Church Lane: …the coin weight’, Quarterly Newsletter—Farnham & District Museum Society, 5 no. 6 (June 1979), 104–06: illus.
- 1979f ‘A borough inventory of 1662’, Quarterly Newsletter—Farnham & District Museum Society, 5 no. 7 (Sept. 1979), 136–37.
- 1979g ‘A vieil heaume d’or of Louis de Maele of Flanders in copper?’, NCirc 87 (1979), 292.
- 1979h ‘A bronze medal of the London Institution’, NCirc 87 (1979), 500–01.
- 1979i ‘Louis XVIII 1815R 20 francs’, SCMB no. 733 (Sep. 1979), 293 (Letters to the editor, from the press, etc.).
- 1980a ‘Material for the study of seventeenth-century Farnham: Harley MS 6166, art. 35, ff. 119–120’, Quarterly Newsletter—Farnham & District Museum Society, 5 no. 11 (Sept. 1980), 8–10: illus.
- 1980b ‘Here we go round to Mabberley’s "Bush"? : notes on a Farnham seventeenth-century token issuer’, Quarterly Newsletter—Farnham & District Museum Society, 5 no. 11 (Sept. 1980), 229–37.
- 1982a ‘Excavations at Park Row, Farnham, Surrey: the coin’, Surrey Archaeological Collections, 73 (1982), 112.
- 1982b ‘Lead tokens: an introduction’, Quarterly Newsletter—Farnham & District Museum Society, 6 no. 7 (Sept. 1982), 151–52.
- 1983a ‘The history, architecture and archaeology of Johnson’s Corner, Alton: the coins and tokens’, Proceedings of the Hampshire Field Club and Archaeological Society, 39 (1983), frames 50–51; summary, p. 104.
- 1984a ‘Un monnayage anglo-breton au XIVe siècle?’, BSFN 39 no. 6 (juin 1984: Journées Numismatiques, Le Havre), 508-11: illus.
- 1986a ‘Quelques monnaies rares de Châteaudun et de Vendôme’, BSFN 41 no. 6 (juin 1986: Journées Numismatiques, Châteaudun), 66-67: illus.
- 1990a ‘The coins and tokens from Borelli Yard’, in: Excavations at Borelli Yard, Farnham, Surrey, 1985–86, [by] Nicholas Riall & Valerie Shelton-Bunn [Farnham, 1990], pp. 31–34.
- 1990b-c ‘Dr G. C. Williamson and Guildford’, SCMB no. 851 (June 1990), 137–39; 852 (July/Aug 1990), 165–68.
- 1992a ‘Le piéfort au Moyen-Age: nouveaux piéforts de deniers tournois de Saint Louis et d’Eudes IV de Bourgogne’, BSFN 47 (Sept. 1992), 393–95.
- 1997a-b The Gros Tournois: proceedings of the fourteenth Oxford symposium on coinage and monetary history, ed. N. J. Mayhew (Oxford: Ashmolean Museum in association with Royal Numismatic Society and Société française de Numismatique). Partial contents:-R. A. Merson, ‘The silver mailles of Philip III (1270-1285) and Philip IV (1285-1314) of France’, pp. 399–419; -R. A. Merson, ‘Gros tournois: a bibliography’, pp. 467–516.
- 1997c ‘Une monnaie rare retrouvée: le denier à la tête dite "chinonaise" ou anépigraphique (PA 212) à attribuer à Nantes, Xe siècle’, BSFN 52 no. 6 (juin 1997: Journées Numismatiques, Tours), 122–23.
- 1997d ‘Deux deniers rares ou inédits de Richard I, duc de Normandie (942-996)’ [par] Merson (R. A.), Woodhead (P.), BSFN 52 no. 6 (juin 1997), 123-25: illus.
- 1997e ‘A propos du tournois d’or à la croix (écu d’or de Saint Louis)’, [par] Bompaire (M.), Merson (R. A.), BSFN 52 no. 6 (juin 1997), 125–27.
- 1997f ‘Fragment d’une trouvaille de guénars tardifs de Charles VI (1380-1422)’, BSFN 52 no. 6 (juin 1997), 157-59: illus.
- 1998 ‘Gros tournois et mailles tierces: essai de classification’, BSFN 53 no. 6 (juin 1998: Journées Numismatiques, Laon), 134–39.
- 1999a ‘Binding question’, Coin News, 36 no. 7 (July 1999), 59 (Letters to the editor).
- 2001a-b Exhibitions: (1) ‘Medallion dated … 1833’; (2) ‘Royal Mint internal tokens’, BNJ 71 (2001), 213.
- 2002a-b Reviews: Marc Bompaire and Françoise Dumas, Numismatique Médiévale; Jean-Paul Divo, Numismatique de Murbach, NC 162 (2002), 453–54.
- 2002c Reviews: Roy S. Hanashiro, Thomas William Kinder & the Japanese Imperial Mint, 1868–1875, NC 162 (2002), 457–60.
- 2015 The London Mint of Constantius and Constantine, [by] Hubert J. Cloke & Lee Toone (London: Spink, 2015): R. A. Merson collection acknowledged, p. 244.
