= Gérard Fussman =

French indologist (1940–2022)

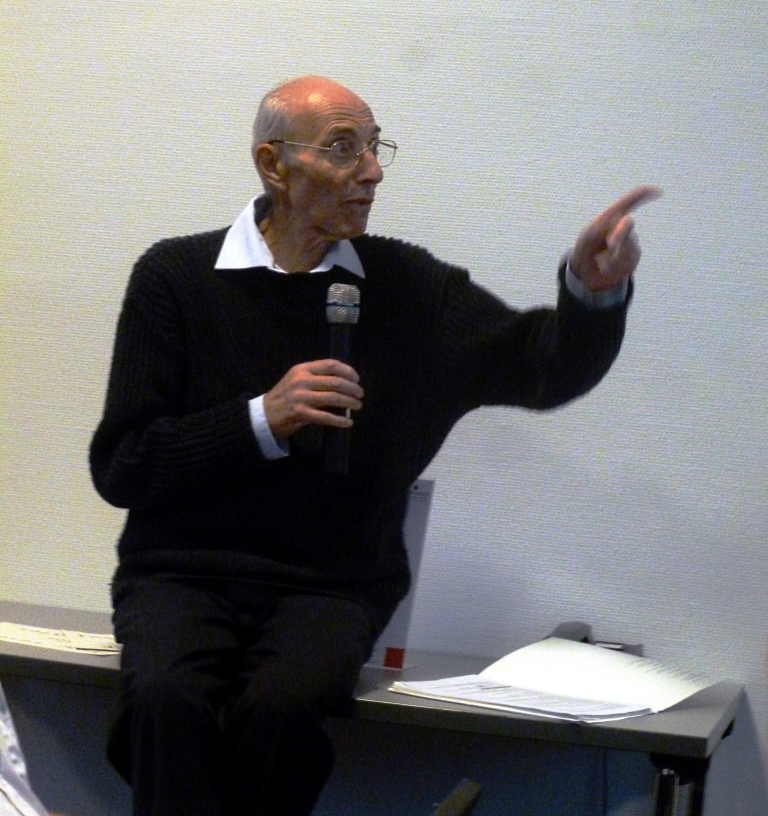
Prof. Gerard Fussman at the Berlin symposium on Kushans in Dec. 2013

Gérard Fussman (17 May 1940 – 14 May 2022) was a French indologist who was a professor at the Collège de France.

Fussman was born in Lens, Pas-de-Calais on 17 May 1940. He died in Strasbourg on 14 May 2022, at the age of 81.

== Partial list of publications ==
- "Die Felsbildstation Shatial" Gérard Fussman & Ditte König Journal of Near Eastern Studies Vol. LIX, NO. 2 April 2000
- "Une étape décisive dans l’étude des monnaies kouchanes" Revue Numismatique, 6e série, XXVIII, pages 145 à 173 (sur la numismatique et la chronologie des Kouchans). Paris
- "Upâya-kauśalya. L’implantation du bouddhisme au Gandhâra" Études thématiques n °2 : Bouddhisme et cultures locales. Quelques cas de réciproques adaptations. Actes du colloque Franco-japonais de septembre 1991 édités par Fukui Fumimasa & Gérard Fussman. Pages 17–51. École Française d’Extrême Orient, Paris, 1994
- "L’inscription de Rabatak et l’origine de l’ère śaka" Journal Asiatique, 1998 fascicule 2. Pages 571-651 Paris
- "Monuments bouddhiques de la région de Caboul, I, Le monastère de Gul Dara" Marc Le Berre & Gérard Fussman Mémoires de la Délégation Archéologique Française en Afghanistan, tome XXII Diffusion De Boccard, Paris, 1976
- "Antiquities of Northern Pakistan, vol. 3" Sous la direction de Gérard Fussman & Karl Jettmar, en collaboration avec Ditte König. Heidelberger Akademie der Wissenschaften, Forschungsstelle "Felsbilder und Inschriften am Karakorum Highway" Verlag Philipp von Zabern, Mainz, 1994
- "La place des Sukhavati-vyuha dans le bouddhisme indien" Journal Asiatique 1999-2. Pages 755-818
- "Une peinture sur pierre : le triptyque au stupa de Shatial. vol. 3" Sous la direction de Gérard Fussman, Karl Jettmar, en collaboration evec Ditte König In Heidelberger Akademie der Wissenschaften, Forschungsstelle "Felsbilder und Inschriften am Karakorum Highway", Verlag Philipp von Zabern, Mainz, 1994. Pages 1–56
- "Chilas, Hatun et les bronzes bouddhiques du Cachemire" Antiquities of Northern Pakistan, Reports and Studies vol. 2. Sous la direction de Karl Jettmar, en collaboration avec Ditte König et Martin Bemann. Pages 1–60 Verlag Philipp von Zabern, Mainz, 1993
- "Ménandre l’Indo-grec ou Paul Demiéville revisité" Journal Asiatique 1993, 1-2, pages 61–138
- "Pouvoir central et régions dans l’Inde ancienne: le problème de l’empire maurya" Annales ESC, n°4, juillet-août 1982, pages 621-647
- "Le concept d'empire dans l'Inde ancienne" Le concept d'empire. Sous la direction de Maurice Duverger, Centre d'Analyse Comparative des Systèmes Politiques. Pages 379-396 Presses Universitaires de France, Paris, 1980
- "Pour une problématique nouvelle des religions indiennes anciennes" Journal Asiatique 1977, pages 21–70
- Aryas, Aryens et Iraniens en Asie Centrale Fussman, G.; Kellens, J.; Francfort, H.-P.; Tremblay, X.. (2005) Institut Civilisation Indienne ISBN 2-86803-072-6
