= Elizabeth Errington =

Numismatist

- Education: SOAS, University of London

Elizabeth Errington is a specialist on the archaeology of Gandhara and the collections of Charles Masson, and a numismatist specialising in Asian coins.

== Biography ==
Errington grew up in Potchefstroom in South Africa and gained a diploma at the Johannesburg School of Art in 1967. Subsequently she worked as a graphic designer in South Africa and London. Errington entered the School of Oriental and African Studies in 1977 and gained her B.A. Honours in Near and Middle East History and Archaeology in 1980. Errington then worked part-time on her PhD from 1980-1987 on 19th-century archaeology in Gandhara and Afghanistan entitled: The Western Discovery of the Art of Gandhara and the Finds of Jamalgarhi.

Errington worked for the British Institute of Persian Studies in 1988 preparing the catalogue of the Ghubayra Excavations, Iran, for publication.

After her PhD at the School of Oriental and African Studies, Errington worked on the "Crossroads of Asia" exhibition and catalogue at the Fitzwilliam Museum, Cambridge, 1992. She then joined the Department of Coins and Medals at the British Museum, working with Joe Cribb, Helen Wang, Vesta Sarkhosh Curtis, and Robert Bracey on Asian coins, making a significant contribution to Silk Road Numismatics.

A major project - the Charles Masson Project - was completed in 2021 with the publication of the third and final volume on the Masson Collection at the British Museum.

Errington is an advisor to Oxford University's Gandhara Connections project.

== Publications ==
Catalogues resulting from the Masson Project

- Charles Masson and the Buddhist Sites of Afghanistan: Explorations, Excavations, Collections 1832-1835, by Elizabeth Errington, British Museum Research Publication 215 (2017).
- The Charles Masson Archive: British Library, British Museum and Other Documents Relating to the 1832–1838 Masson Collection from Afghanistan, by Elizabeth Errington, assisted by Piers Baker, Kirstin Leighton-Boyce and Wannaporn Kay Rienjang, British Museum Research Publication 216 (2017).
- Charles Masson: Collections from Begram and Kabul Bazaar, Afghanistan 1833–1838, by Elizabeth Errington, with contributions by Joe Cribb, Lauren Morris, Piers Baker, Paramdip Khera, Chantal Fabregues, Kirstin Leighton-Boyce and Wannaporn Kay Rienjang, British Museum Research Publication 219 (2021).

Selected Other Publications

- E. Errington and V.S. Curtis, From Persepolisto the Punjab. Exploring the Past in Iran, Afghanistan and Pakistan (London, The British Museum Press, 2007), passim.
- E. Errington, ‘“Boots”, “female idols” and disembodied heads’, Journal of Inner Asian Art and Archaeology I (2006), pp. 89–96
- E. Errington, ‘Charles Masson’, Encyclopaedia Iranica online (2004)
- E. Errington, ‘Ancient Afghanistan through the eyes of Charles Masson: the Masson Project at the British Museum’, International Institute for Asian Studies Newsletter (March 2002), pp. 8–9
- E. Errington, ‘The collections of Charles Masson (1800-53)’, Circle of Inner Asian Art Newsletter 15 (2002), pp. 29–30
- E. Errington, ‘Discovering ancient Afghanistan, The Masson Collection’, Minerva 13/6 (2002), pp. 53–5
- E. Errington, ‘Discovering ancient Afghanistan’, British Museum Magazine 44 (2002), p. 8
- E. Errington, ‘Charles Masson and Begram’, Topoi 11/1 (2001 [2003]), pp. 357–409
- A.D.H. Bivar; Geza Fehervari; Patricia Baker; Elizabeth Errington; Nigel Errington; Susan Tyler-Smith; Mehrdad Shokoohy Excavations at Ghubayra, Iran, 1971-1976 2000 (School of Oriental and African Studies, University of London)
- E. Errington, ‘Rediscovering the collections of Charles Masson’, in M. Alram and D. E. Klimburg-Salter (eds.) Coins, Art and Chronology. Essays on the pre-Islamic History of the Indo-Iranian Borderlands (Vienna, Österreichische Akademie der Wissenschaften, 1999), pp. 207–37
- E. Errington, Joe Cribb, Maggie Claringbull, The Crossroads of Asia : transformation in image and symbol in the art of ancient Afghanistan and Pakistan, Cambridge: Ancient India and Iran Trust, 1992.
