= Charles Surasky =

Numismatist

Charles Surasky is an expert numismatist with a special interest in postal notes. His work includes:

- Identifying the Postal Notes of 1883 to 1894, First Edition, 1985
- The Binion Collection: Silver Dollars from the Hoard of Ted Binion
- regular contributions to the American Numismatic's Association's "Money Talks"
- regular contributions to Numismatist
- and creation of numismatic related crossword puzzles.
