= Royal Numismatic Society of Belgium =

The Royal Numismatic Society of Belgium, known in Dutch as the Koninklijk Belgisch Genootschap voor Numismatiek and in French as the Société Royale de Numismatique de Belgique, is a society focusing on the field of numismatics.

== About the Society ==
The Society was founded on 28 November 1841. It celebrated its 150th anniversary in 1991, when a history of the society was written. It is a non-profit organization under the High Protection of the King of the Belgians.

== Publications ==
The Society publishes the journal Revue Belge de Numismatique et de Sigillographie and an annual bibliography of numismatics (since 1988).

== Prizes ==
The Society awards two prizes: Prix de la Société Royale de Numismatique de Belgique and the Prix Hubertus Goltzius.

=== Prix de la Société Royale de Numismatique de Belgique ===
Awarded every four years. Inaugurated in 1976, and first awarded in 1981.

- 2014 Lyce Jankowski - on Chinese numismatics
- 2001 Christophe Flament
- 1998 François de Callataÿ
- 1981 M.-Th. Rath - on the medals of Charles VI

=== Prix Hubertus Goltzius ===
Awarded every three years. To be awarded for the first time in 2019.
