= British Museum Department of Money and Medals =

Department of the British Museum

Coordinates: 51.5195°N 0.1269°W

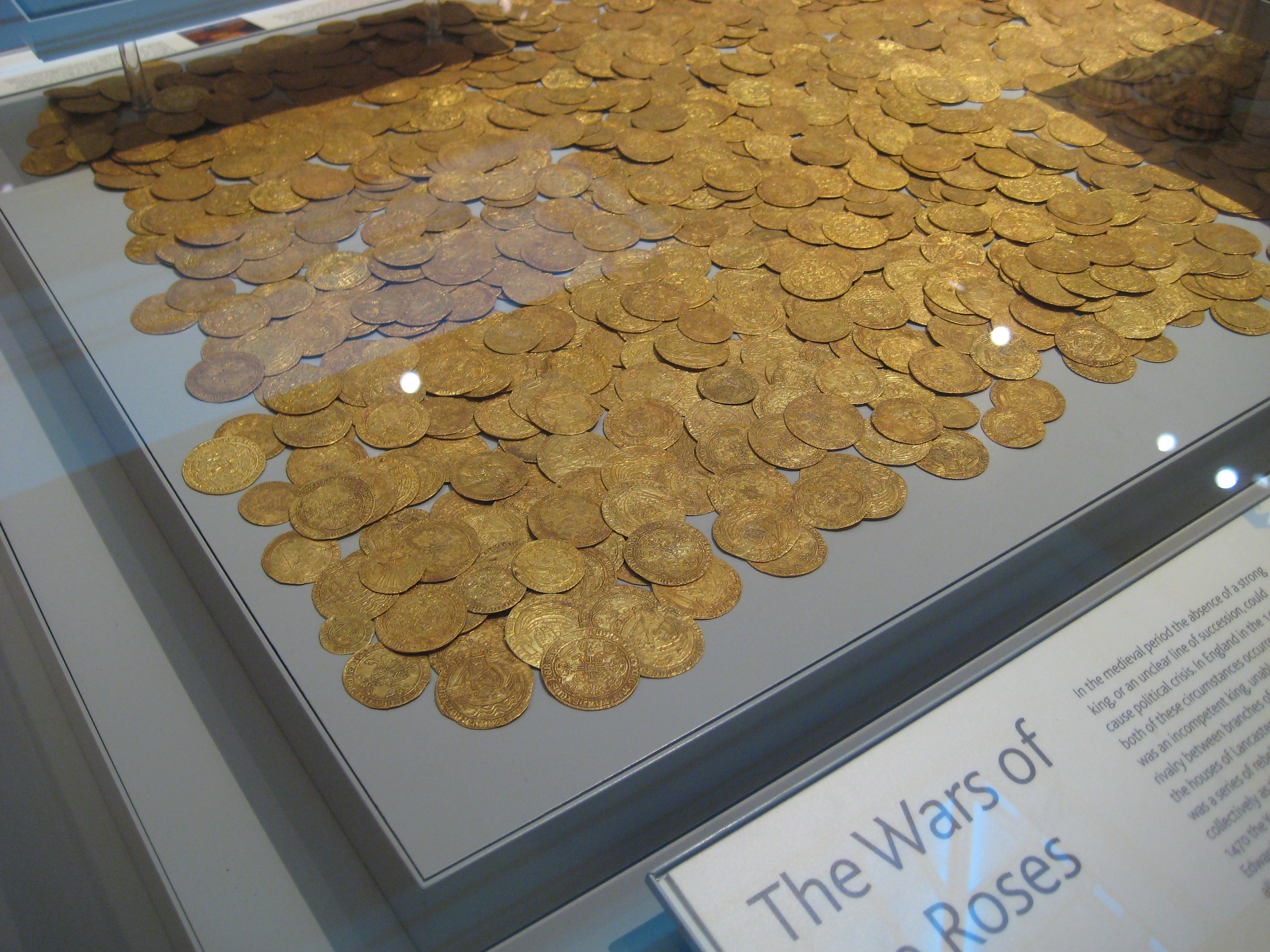
The Fishpool Hoard of mediaeval coins, northern England, late 15th century AD

The British Museum Department of Money and Medals is a department of the British Museum involving the collection, research and exhibition of numismatics, and comprising the largest library of numismatic artefacts in the United Kingdom, including almost one million coins, medals, tokens and other related objects. The collection spans the history of coinage from its origins in the 7th century BC to the present day, and is representative of both Eastern and Western numismatic traditions.

== History ==
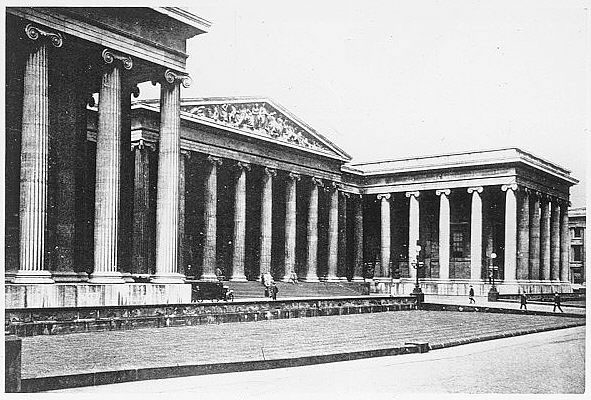
Frontage of the British Museum

Numismatics constituted an important part of the 1753 bequest of Sir Hans Sloane which formed the British Museum's original collection, comprising some 20,000 objects. The collection was incorporated into the Department of Antiquities in 1807, before the establishment of a separate Coins and Medals department in 1860–1.

As in other parts of the museum, the department has been able to expand its collection by purchase, donation and bequest. The department has benefited from the munificence of collectors such as Clayton Mordaunt Cracherode, Sarah Banks, Edward Hawkins, Sir Alexander Cunningham and George Bleazby. A significant strength of the collection are British coins from all ages, which have benefited from the ancient law of Treasure Trove. This has enabled the museum to purchase important hoards of gold and silver coins, many of which were buried during periods of crisis or upheaval. There are approximately 9,000 coins, medals and banknotes on display around the British Museum. More than half of these can be found in the Citi Money Gallery (Gallery 68), while the remainder form part of the permanent displays throughout the museum. Items from the full collection can be seen by the general public in the Study Room by appointment.

The department celebrated its 150th anniversary in 2011.. In March 2024, the department was renamed the Department of Money and Medals.

== Research, publications and exhibitions ==
The Department has a strong research history, which underpins publications (see, for example, the British Museum Catalogues of Coins), exhibitions and other activities.

Publications associated with exhibitions

- 1881 A Guide to the English Medals Exhibited in the King’s Library, by Herbert A. Grueber
- 1881 A Guide to the Italian Medals Exhibited in the King’s Library, by C. E. Keary
- 1883 The British Museum Luther Exhibition, 1883, in the Grenville Library, by George Bullen
- 1924 Guide to the exhibition of historical medals in the British Museum
- 1924 A guide to the exhibition of medals of the Renaissance in the British Museum, by G. F. Hill
- 1975 2000 Years of Coins and Medals, by J. P. C. Kent
- 1979 The Art of the Medal, by Mark Jones
- 1986 Money: from Cowrie shells to credit cards, by Joe Cribb
- 1987 Contemporary British Medals, by Mark Jones
- 1987 As good as gold: 300 years of British banknote design, by Virginia Hewitt and John Keyworth
- 1990 Fake? The art of deception, by Mark Jones
- 1992 FIDEM XXIII: In the Round: Contemporary Art Medals of the World, ed. Philip Attwood
- 1993 Silk Road coins: the Hirayama Collection. A loan exhibition at the British Museum, by Katsumi Tanabe
- 1993 The Hoxne Treasure: an illustrated handbook, by Roger Bland and Catherine Johns
- 1994 Beauty and the Banknote: images of women on paper money, by Virginia Hewitt
- 1995 The Banker’s Art, ed. Virginia Hewitt
- 1996 After Marathon: war, society and money in fifth century Greece, by Ute Wartenberg
- 1998 Humphrey Cole: Mint, measurement and maps in Elizabethan England, ed. Silke Ackernann
- 1998 Convict love tokens: the leaden hearts the convicts left behind, by Michele Field and Timothy Millet
- 1999 Magic coins of Java, Bali and the Malay Peninsula, thirteenth to twentieth centuries, by Joe Cribb
- 1999 Metal Mirror: Coin Photographs, by Stephen Sack
- 1999 Size immaterial: handheld sculpture of the 1990s, by Luke Syson
- 2000 Rebels, pretenders and imposters, by Clive Cheesman and Jonathan Williams
- 2003 Italian Medals c. 1520–1600 in British public collections, by Philip Attwood
- 2004 Badges, by Philip Attwood
- 2007 From Persepolis to the Punjab. Exploring Ancient Iran, Afghanistan and Pakistan, by Elizabeth Errington and Vesta Sarkhosh Curtis, with contributions by Joe Cribb, Jean-Marie Lafont, St John Simpson, Helen Wang
- 2008 Chairman Mao badges: symbols and slogans of the Cultural Revolution, by Helen Wang
- 2009 Medals of dishonour, by Philip Attwood and Felicity Powell
- 2010 Money in Africa, ed. by Catherine Eagleton, Harcourt Fuller and John Perkins
- 2011 Eric Gill: Lust for Letter & Line, by Ruth Cribb and Joe Cribb
- 2013 Coins and the Bible, by Richard Abdy and Amelia Dowler
- 2014 Hard at Work: The Diary of Leonard Wyon 1853–1867, by Philip Attwood
- 2015 Hoards: Hidden History, by Eleanor Ghey
- 2016 Defacing the Past, by Dario Calomino
- 2019 Playing With Money: Currency and Games, by Robert Bracey (London: Spink)
- 2020–22 Rivalling Rome. Parthian Coins and Culture, by Vesta Sarkhosh Curtis and Alexandra Magub (London: Spink, 2020, reprint, 2022)
- 2022 "Displays of money and medals at the British Museum, 1759 to 2022", by Helen Wang, Numismatic Chronicle 182, pp. 313-338.

Other publications

- 1920 Grains and grammes. A table of equivalents for the use of numismatists, by G. F. Hill

== Members of the Department ==
In addition to being numismatists, staff of the department have also been distinguished linguists, historians, archaeologists, art historians, classicists, medievalists, orientalists, and authors:

=== Keepers (Head) of the Department ===
- William Vaux, from 1861
- Reginald Stuart Poole, from 1870
- Barclay Head, from 1893
- Herbert A. Grueber, from 1906
- George Hill, from 1912
- John Allan, from 1931
- Stanley Robinson, from 1949
- John Walker, from 1952
- G. Kenneth Jenkins, from 1965
- Robert Carson, from 1977
- John Kent, from 1983
- Mark Jones, from 1990
- Andrew Burnett, from 1992
- Joe Cribb, from 2002
- Philip Attwood, from 2010
- Tom Hockenhull, from 2022

=== Staff ===
- Richard Abdy
- Jennifer Adam
- Derek Allen
- Benjamin Alsop
- Marion Archibald
- Sabrina Ben Aouicha
- Edward Besley
- Roger Bland
- Maxim Bolt
- Robert Bracey
- Cecile Bresc
- George C. Brooke
- Dario Calomino
- Ian Carradice
- Taylor Combe
- Barrie Cook (numismatist)
- Vesta Sarkhosh Curtis
- Michael Dolley
- Amelia Dowler
- Catherine Eagleton
- Elizabeth Errington
- Henry Flynn
- Percy Gardner
- Leigh Gardner
- Eleanor Ghey
- Andrew Gifford
- Megan Gooch
- Amanda Gregory
- Edward Hawkins
- Virginia Hewitt
- Mary Hinton
- Richard Hobbs
- Thomas Hockenhull
- Francis Keary
- Richard Kelleher
- Paramdip Khera
- Janet Larkin
- Kirstin Leighton-Boyce
- Ian Leins
- Keith Lowe
- Nicholas Lowick
- David MacDowall
- Alexandra Magub
- Joan Martin
- Harold Mattingly
- Andrew Meadows
- Sam Moorhead
- Elvina Noel
- John Orna-Ornstein
- Elizabeth Pendleton
- Laura Phillips
- Stuart Lane Poole
- Jane Portal
- Venetia Porter
- Martin Price
- Edward Rapson
- Richard Southgate
- Luke Syson
- William Sandys Wright Vaux
- Philippa Walton
- Helen Wang
- Ute Wartenberg Archived 13 June 2021 at the Wayback Machine
- Jonathan Williams
- Gareth Williams
- Warwick Wroth

== Gallery ==
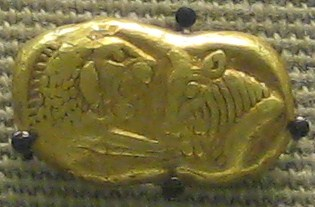
Gold coin of Croesus, Lydian, modern Turkey, c. 550 BC

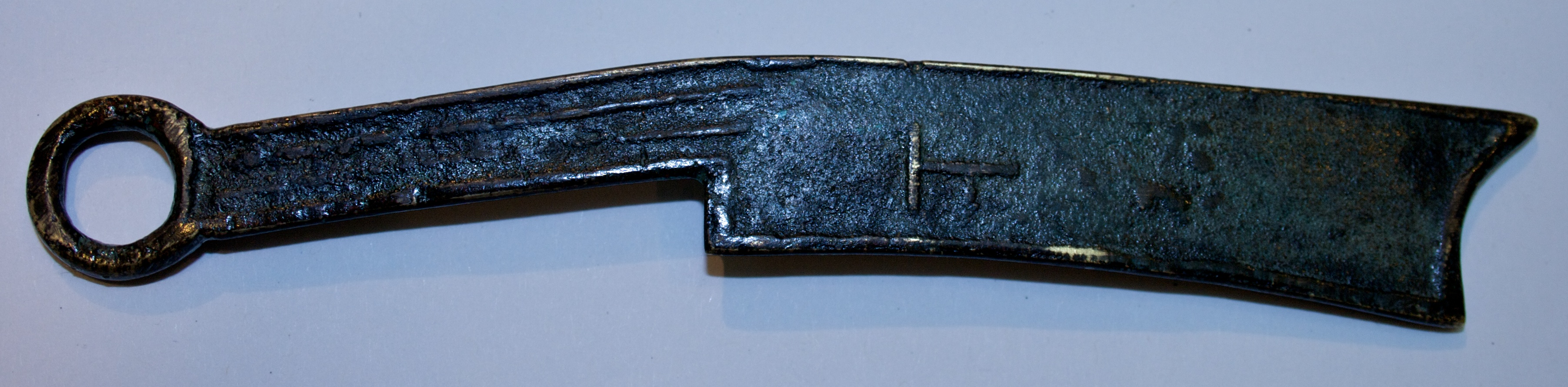
Knife money made from bronze, China, 4th–3rd centuries BC

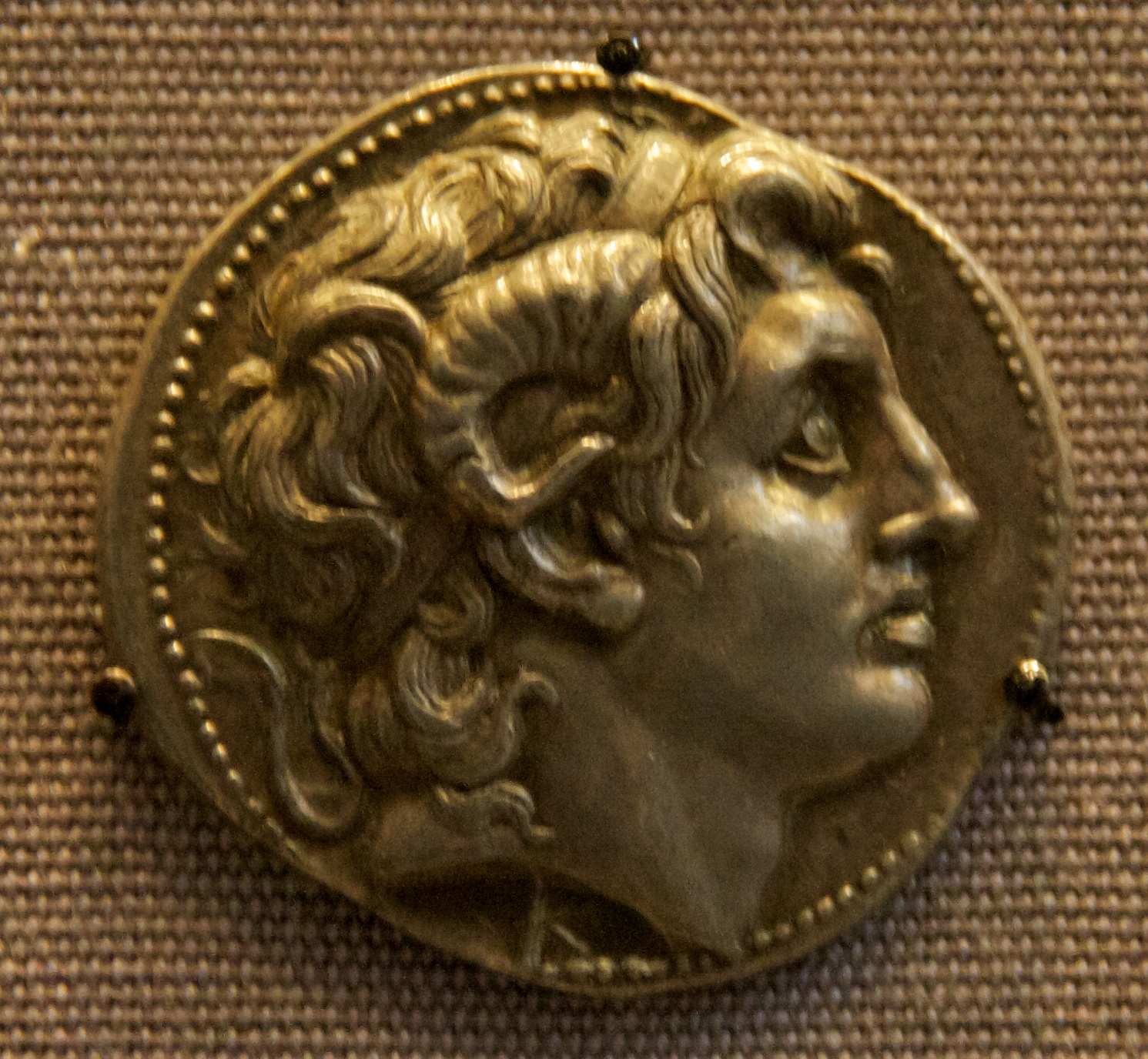
Tetradrachm of Lysimachos with the head of Alexander, Greece, about 305–281 BC

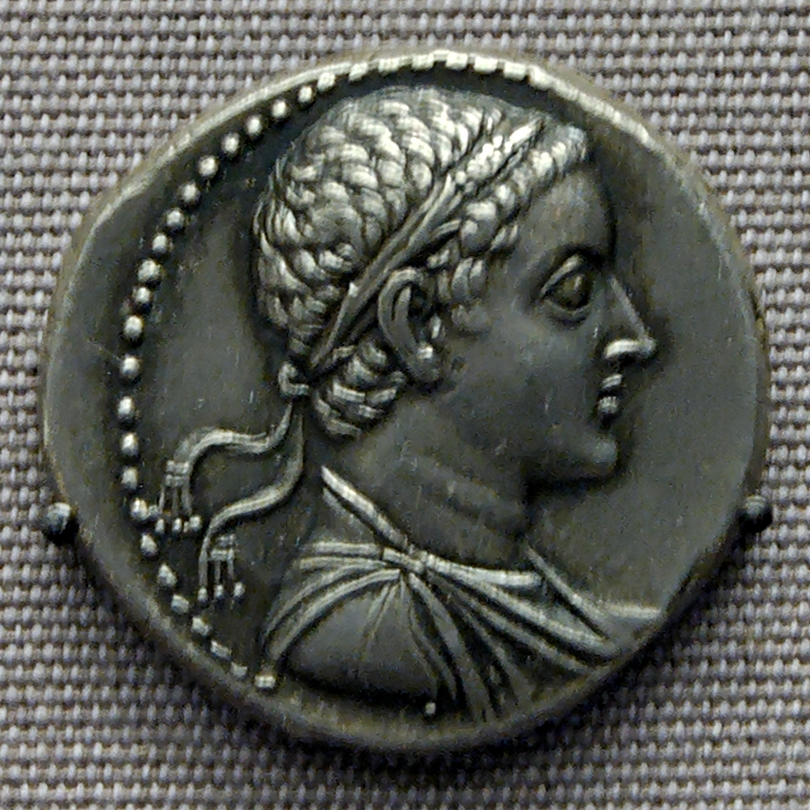
Tetradrachm issued by Ptolemy V, Greece, 204–181 BC

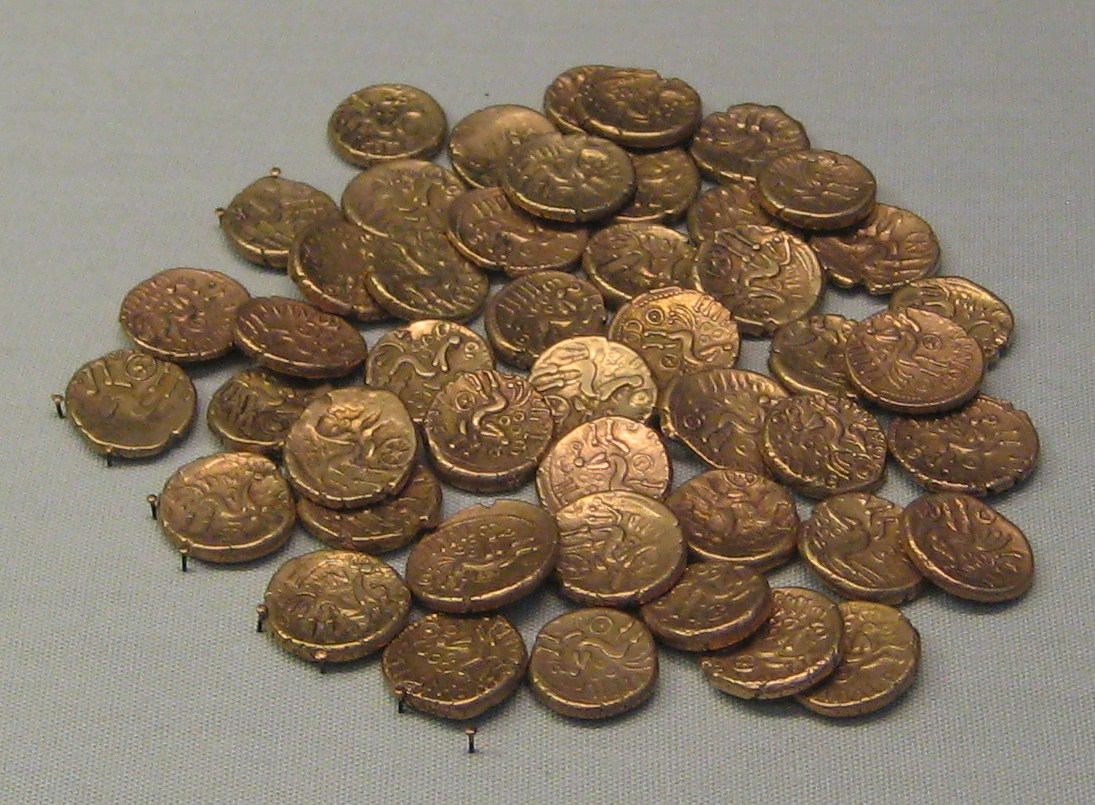
50 gold staters of Commius, Tincomarus and Eppillus, Alton, southern England, 1st century BC – 1st century AD

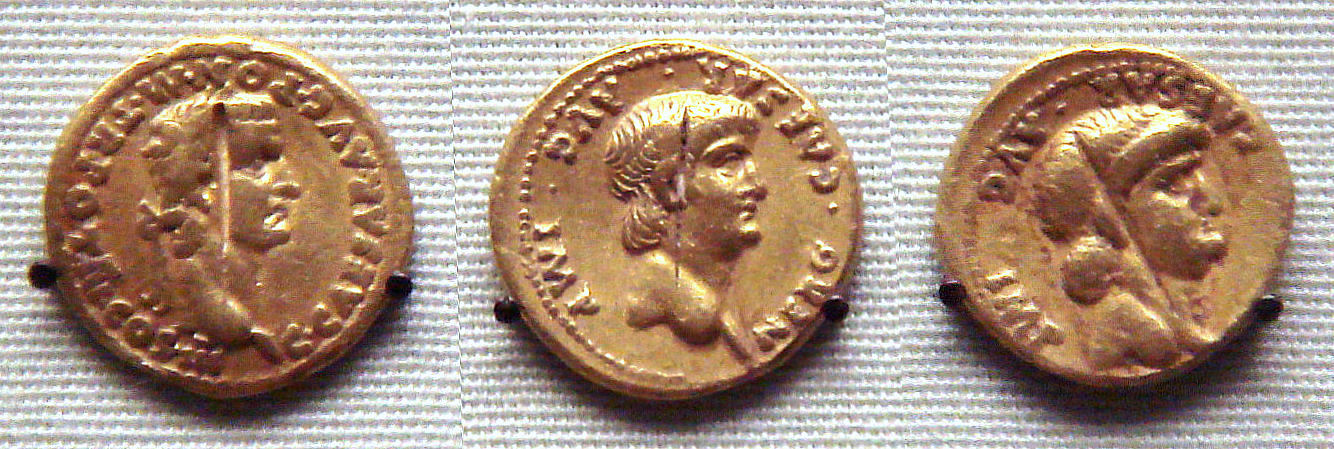
Roman coins of Nero and Caligula found at Pudukottai, India, 1st century AD

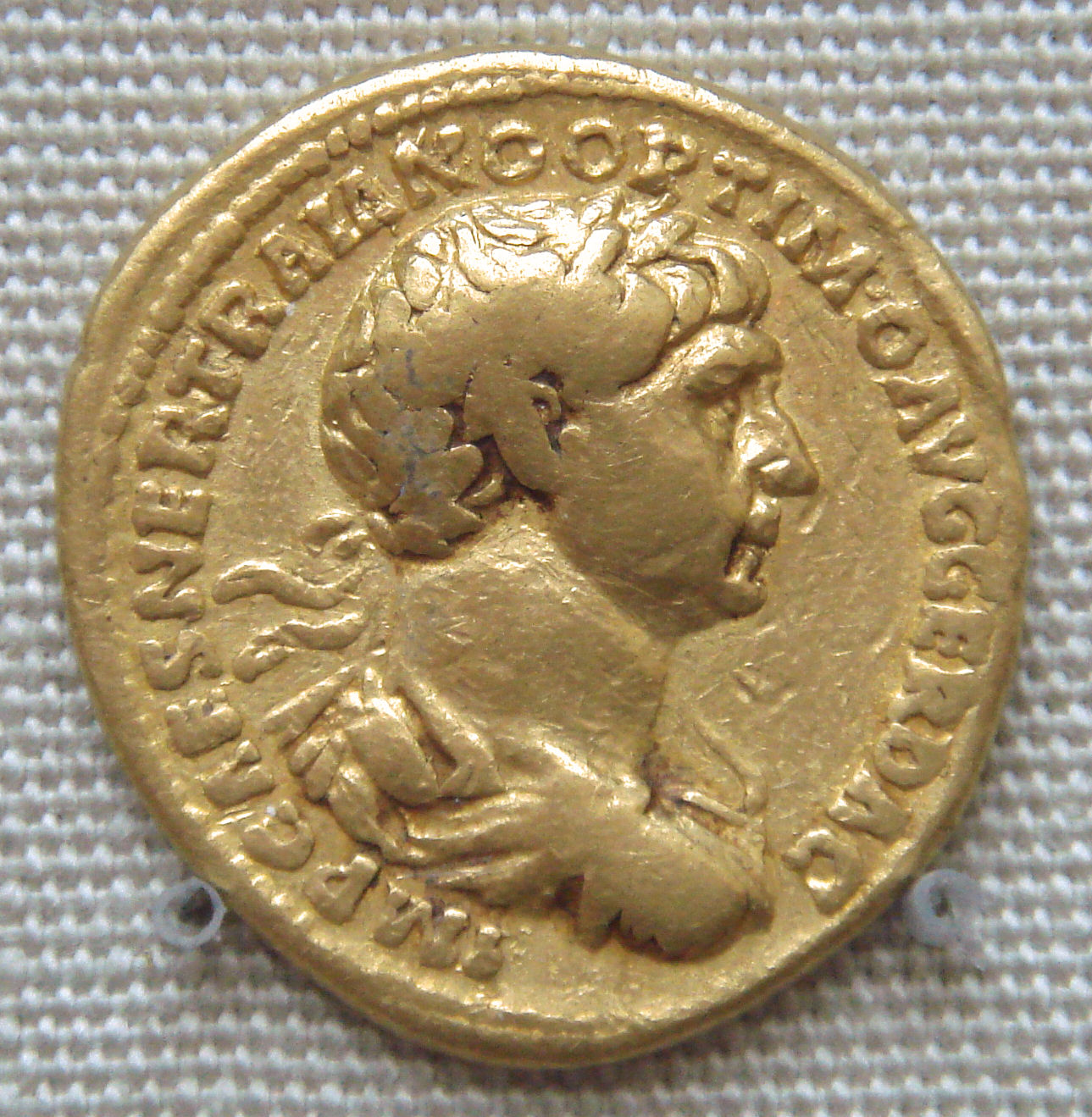
Coin of Trajan from Ahin Posh Buddhist monastery in Afghanistan, 2nd century AD

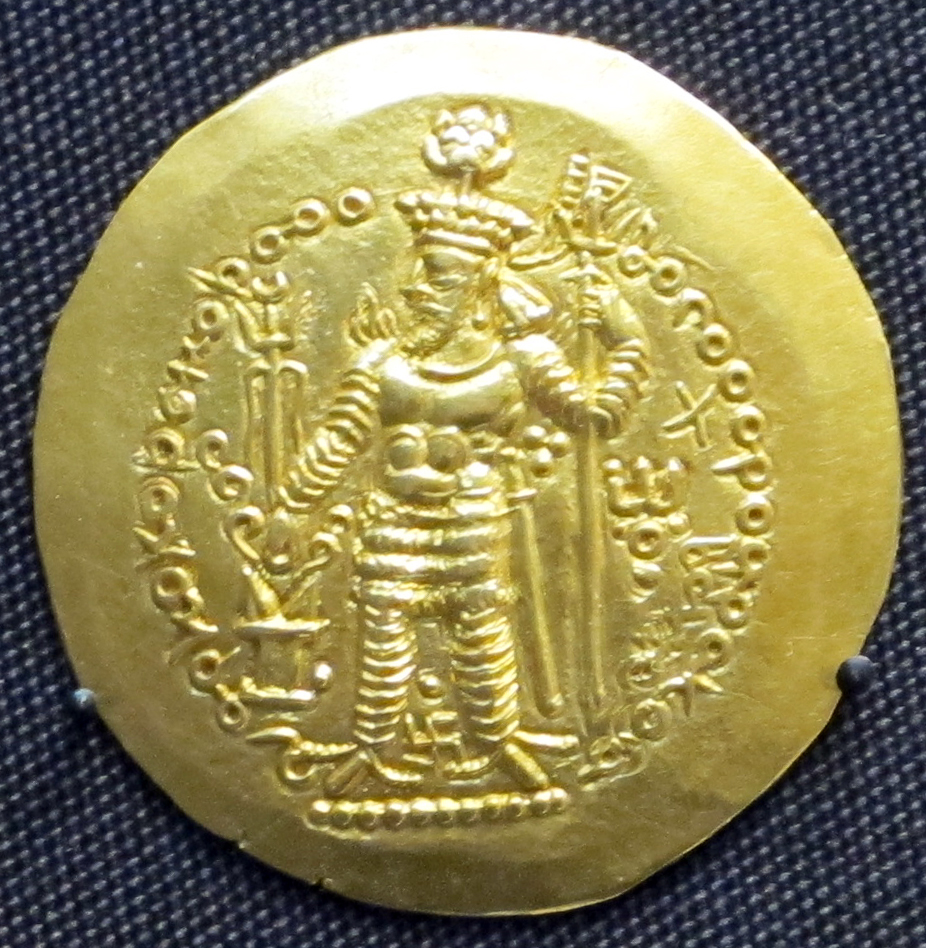
Gold coin from Bactria, Afghanistan, 4th century AD

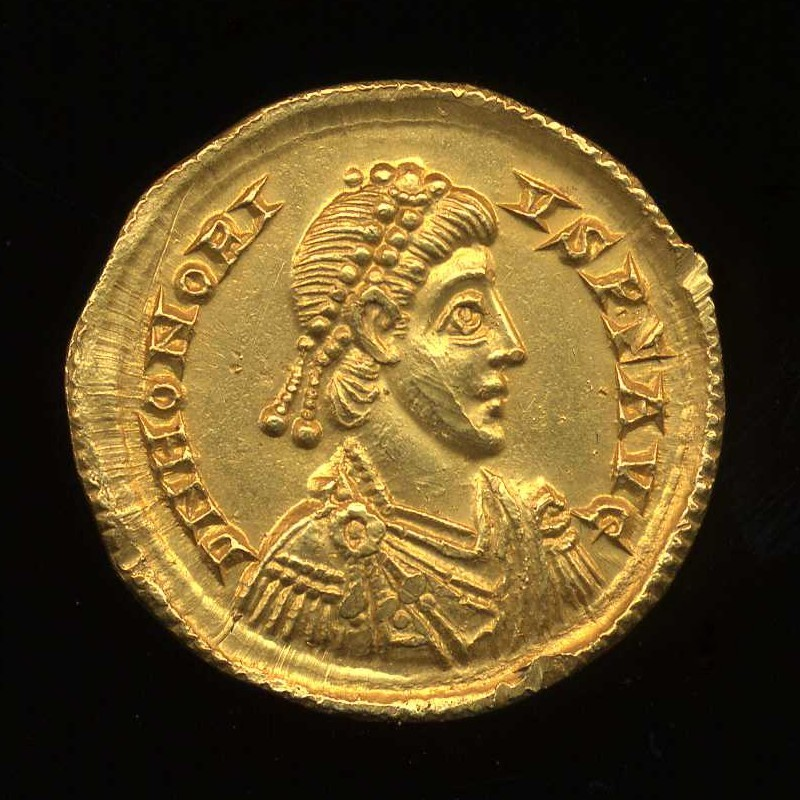
Gold coin of Emperor Honorius from Hoxne Hoard, England, 4th–5th centuries AD

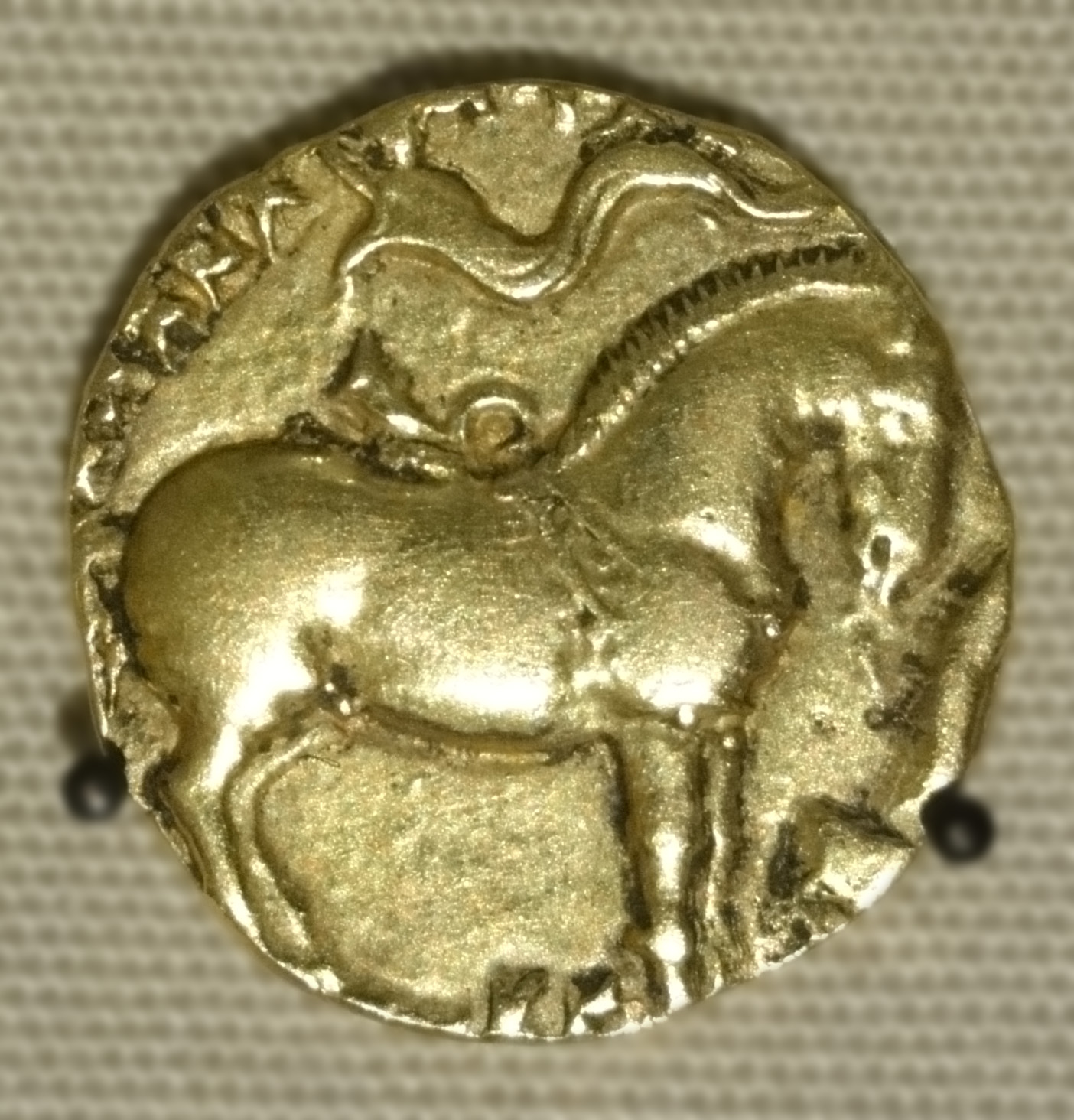
Gold coin of Kumaragupta I, Gupta Empire, India, 415–455 AD

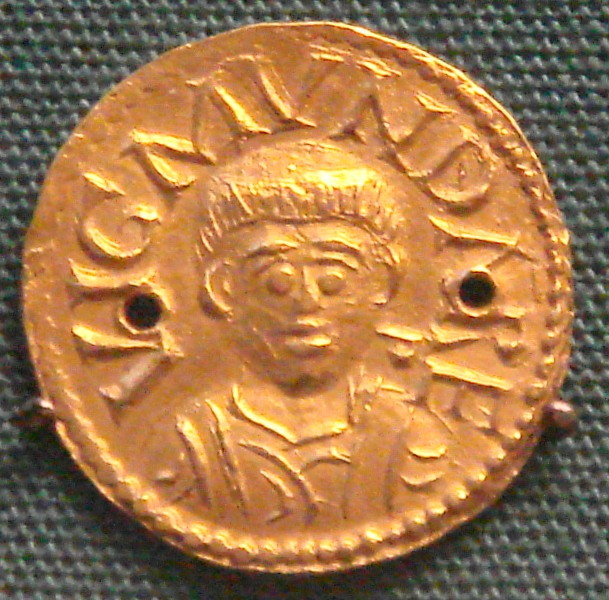
Gold solidus of Wigmund, Archbishop of York, northern England, 837–854 AD

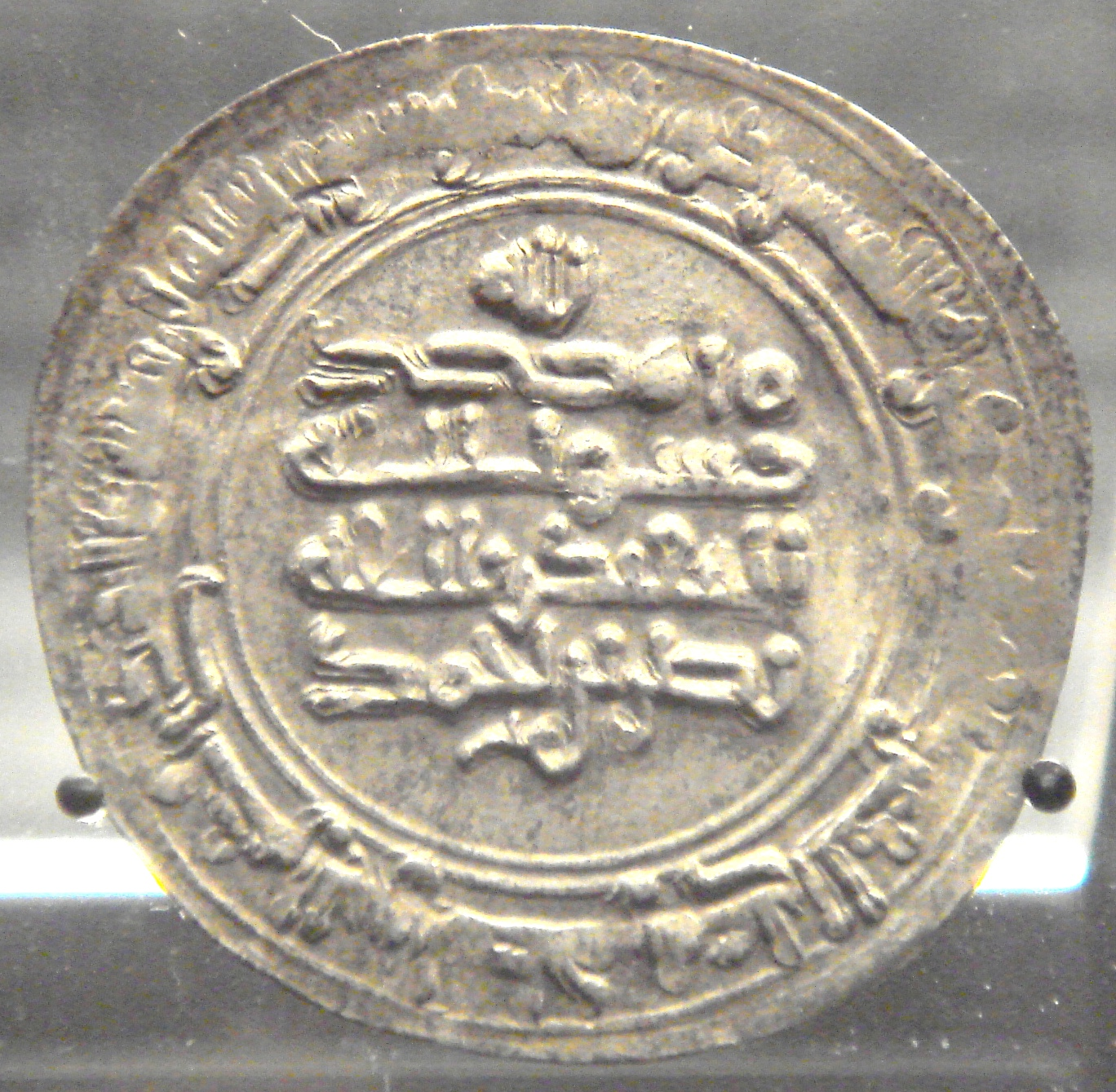
Nasr II, Nishapur coin, central Asia, 921–922 AD

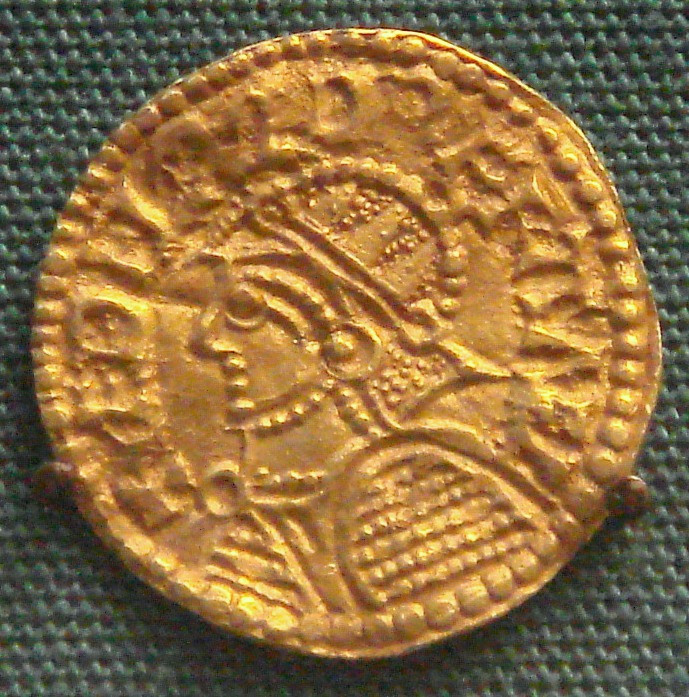
Aethelred II gold mancus, England, 1003–1006 AD

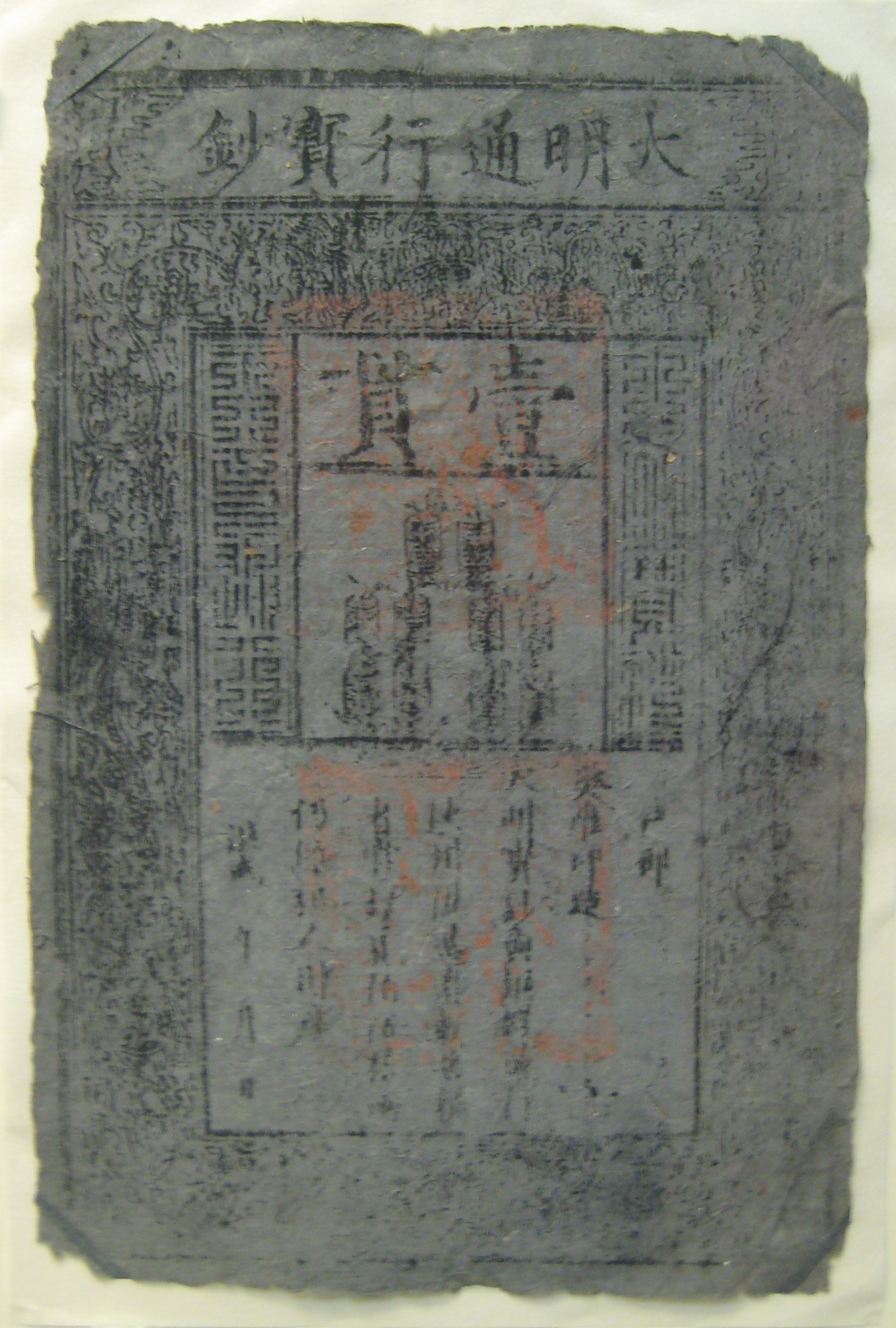
Chinese Ming banknote for 1 guan, China, 1375 AD

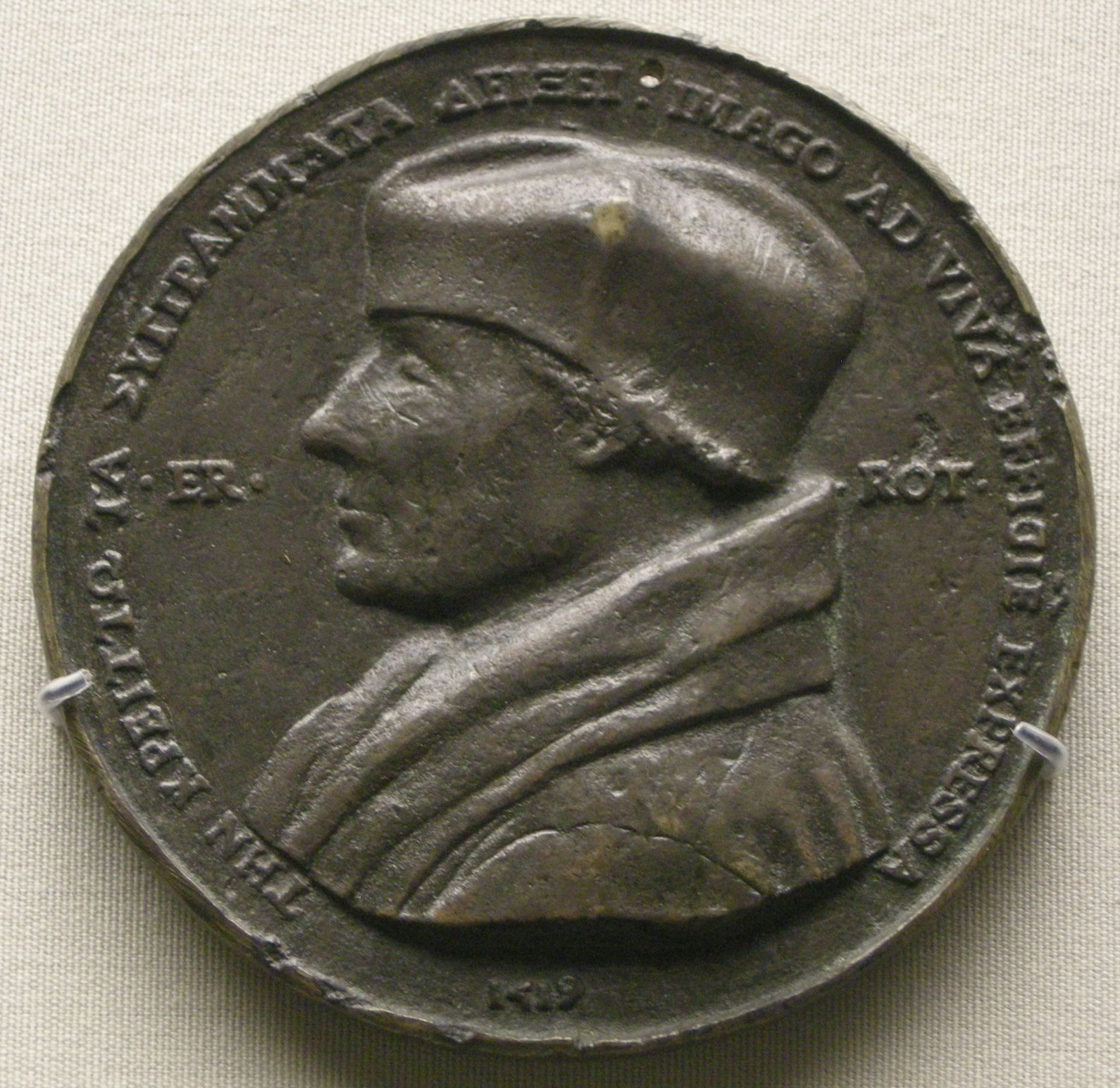
Renaissance medal of Desiderius Erasmus, by Quentin Massijs, Holland, 16th century AD

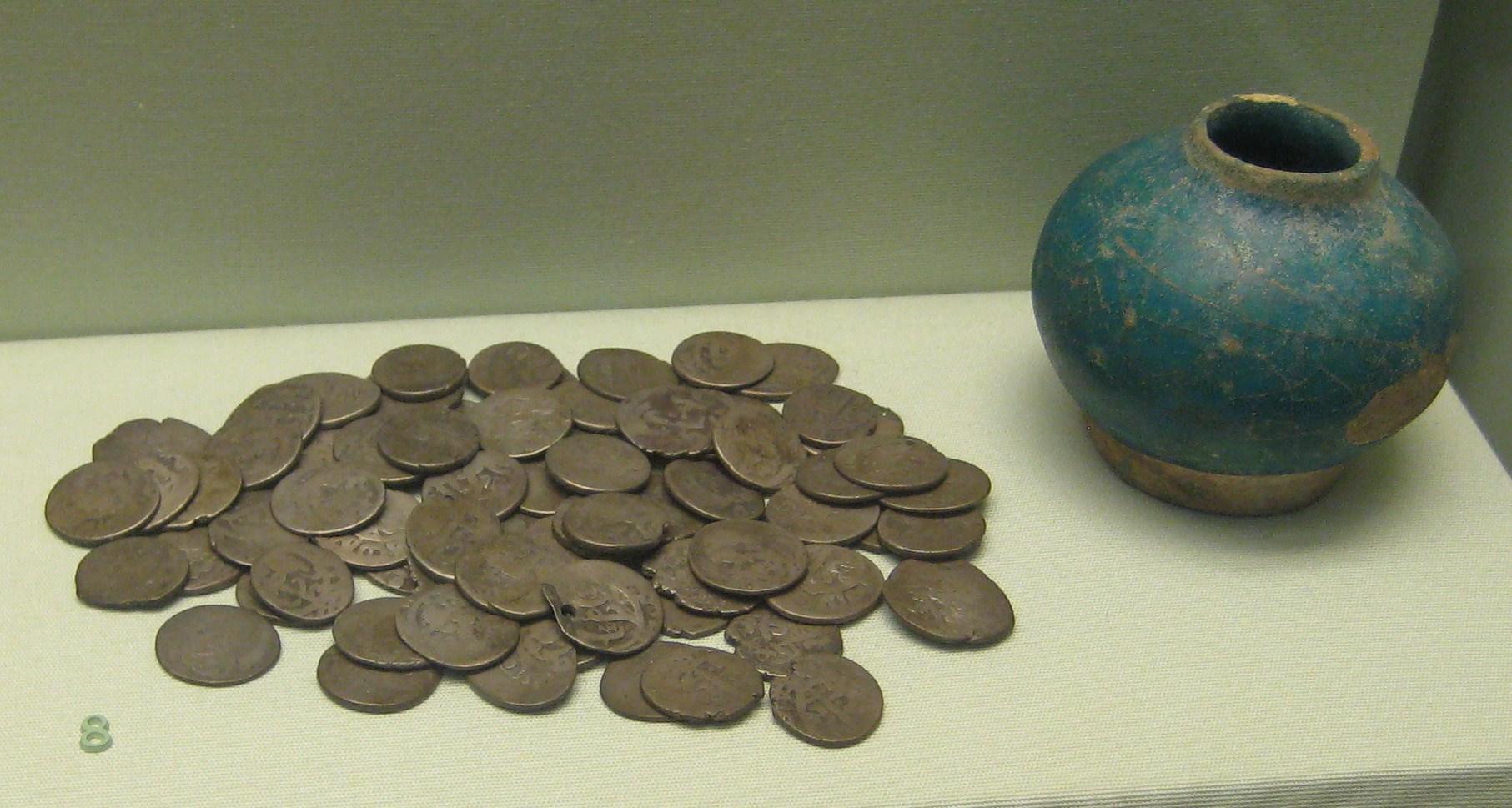
Hoard comprising 78 Persian silver coins from Sharjah, United Arab Emirates, late 17th century AD

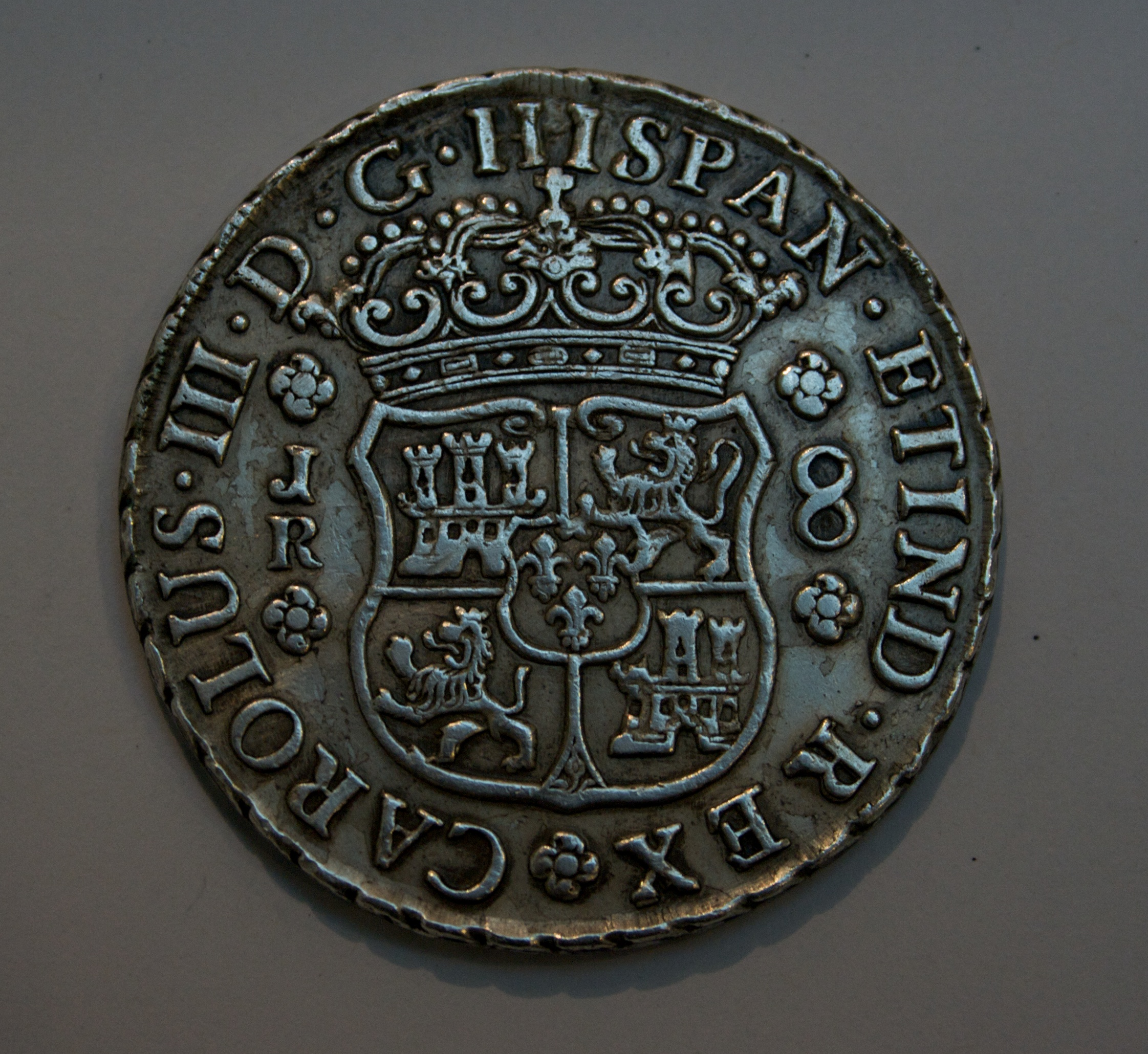
8 Reales silver coin minted in Potosí, Bolivia, 1770 AD

== See also ==
- British Museum Catalogues of Coins
- Numismatics
- Silk Road numismatics
- Digital Book Index
