= British Museum Catalogues of Coins =

The British Museum Catalogues of Coins was a series envisioned and initiated by Reginald Stuart Poole, Keeper of the Department of Money and Medals, at the British Museum, between 1870 and 1893. The aim was to produce a scholarly series of catalogues of the collection, based on the British Museum's collection and other collections. The series continued after his retirement, and continues to this day, with the collection increasingly being made available online.

== Series: Catalogue of the Greek Coins in the British Museum ==
The series editor was Reginald Stuart Poole, and the authors/editors were Percy Gardner, Barclay Vincent Head, and Warwick Wroth.

- Vol. 1: Italy - R.S. Poole (1873)
- Vol. 2: Sicily – P. Gardner, B.V. Head, and R.S. Poole (1876)
- Vol. 3: The Tauric Chersonese, Sarmatia, Dacia, Moesia, Thrace, &c. – P. Gardner and B.V. Head (1877)
- Vol. 4: The Seleucid Kings of Syria – P. Gardner (1878)
- Vol. 5: Macedonia, etc. – B.V. Head (1879)
- Vol. 6: Thessaly to Aetolia – P. Gardner (1883)
- Vol. 7: The Ptolemies, kings of Egypt – R.S. Poole (1883)
- Vol. 8: Central Greece (Locris, Phocis, Boeotia, and Euboea) – B.V. Head (1884)
- Vol. 9: Crete and the Aegean Islands – W. Wroth (1886)
- Vol. 10: Peloponnesus (excluding Corinth) – P. Gardner (1887)
- Vol. 11: Attica-Megaris-Aegina – B.V. Head (1888)
- Vol. 12: Corinth, colonies of Corinth, etc. - B.V. Head (1889)
- Vol. 13: Pontus, Paphlagonia, Bithynia, and the Kingdom of Bosporus - W. Wroth (1889)
- Vol. 14: Ionia - B.V. Head (1892)
- Vol. 15: Of Alexandria and the nomes - R.S. Poole (1892)
- Vol. 16: Mysia - W. Wroth (1894)
- Vol. 17: Troas, Aeolis, and Lesbos - W. Wroth (1894)
- Vol. 18: Caria, Cos, Rhodes &c. - B.V. Head (1897)
- Vol. 19: Lycia, Pamphylia, and Pisidia - G.F. Hill (1897)
- Vol. 20: Galatia, Cappadocia, and Syria - W. Wroth (1898)
- Vol. 21: Lycaonia, Isauria, and Cilicia - G.F. Hill (1900)
- Vol. 22: Lydia - B.V. Head (1901)
- Vol. 23: Cyprus - G.F. Hill (1904)
- Vol. 24: Phrygia - B.V. Head (1906)
- Vol. 25: Phoenicia - G.F. Hill (1910)
- Vol. 26: Palestine (Galilee, Samaria, and Judaea) - G.F. Hill (1914)
- Vol. 27: Arabia Mesopotamia, and Persia : (Nabataea, Arabia Provincia, S. Arabia, Mesopotamia, Babylonia, Assyria, Persia, Alexandrine Empire of the East, Persis, Elymais, Characene) - G.F. Hill (1922)
- Vol. 28: Cyrenaica - E.S.G. Robinson (1927)

== Series: Coins of the Roman Empire in the British Museum ==
This series was prepared by Harold Mattingly, R. A. G. Carson, and P. V. Hill.

- Vol. 1: Augustus to Vitellius - H. Mattingly (1923), (2nd edition 1976, prepared by R.A.G. Carson)
- Vol. 2: Vespasian to Domitian - H. Mattingly (1930), (2nd edition 1976, prepared by R.A.G. Carson).
- Vol. 3: Nerva to Hadrian - H. Mattingly (1936), (2nd edition 1976, prepared by R.A.G. Carson).
- Vol. 4: Antoninus Pius to Commodus - H. Mattingly (1940), (2nd edition in 1968).
- Vol. 5: Pertinax to Elagabalus - H. Mattingly (1950), (2nd edition 1975, prepared by R.A.G. Carson & P.V. Hill).
- Vol. 6: Severus Alexander to Balbinus and Pupienus - R.A.G. Carson (1962)

== Series: Catalogue of Oriental Coins in the British Museum ==
These catalogues were prepared by Stanley Lane Poole, and edited by Reginald Stuart Poole.

- Vol. 1: The coins of the Eastern Khaleefehs in the British Museum (1875)
- Vol. 2: The coins of the Mohammedan dynasties in the British Museum, classes III-X (1876)
- Vol. 3: The coins of the Turkman houses of Seljook, Urtuk, Zengee, etc, in the British Museum, classes X-XIV (1877)
- Vol. 4: The coinage of Egypt under the Fatimee Khaleefehs, the Ayyoobees and the Memlook Sultans, classes XIVa-XV (1879)
- Vol. 5: The coins of the Moors of Africa and Spain and the kings of the Yemen in the British Museum, classes XIVb-XXVII (1880)
- Vol. 6: The coins of the Mongols in the British Museum, classes XVIII-XXII (1881)
- Vol. 7: The coinage of Bukhara (Transoxiana) in the British Museum from the time of Timur to the present day, classes XXII- XXIII (1882)
- Vol. 8: The coins of the Turks in the British Museum, class XXVI (1883)
- Vol. 9: Additions to the Oriental collection 1876-1888, Part I: additions to vols I-IV (1889)
- Vol. 10: Additions to the Oriental Collection 1876-1888, part II, additions to vols V-VIII (1890)

== Series: Catalogue of Indian coins in the British Museum ==
These catalogues were compiled by Stanley Lane Poole, Percy Gardner, E. J. Rapson and John Allan, and the series was edited by Reginald Stuart Poole. For details of the collectors, authors, editors, printers, publishers and distributors of this series, see Helen Wang and Elizabeth Errington (2019).

- Vol. 1: The coins of the sultans of Delhi in the British Museum - Stanley Lane Poole (1884)
- Vol. 2: The coins of the Muhammadan states of India in the British Museum - Stanley Lane Poole (1886)
- Vol. 3: The coins of the Greek and Scythic kings of Bactria and India in the British Museum - Percy Gardner (1886)
- Vol. 4: The coins of the Moghul emperors of Hindustan in the British Museum - Stanley Lane Poole (1892)
- Vol. 5: Catalogue of the coins of the Andhra dynasty, the Western Ksatrapas, the Traikutaka dynasty, and the "Bodhi" dynasty - E. J. Rapson (1908)
- Vol. 6: Catalogue of the coins of the Gupta dynasties and of Sasanka, king of Guada - J. Allan (1914)
- Vol. 7: Catalogue of the coins of ancient India - J. Allan (1936)

== Series: Catalogue of Roman Provincial Coins ==
This is a joint publication series with the Bibliothèque nationale de France, authored/edited by Andrew Burnett, Michel Amandry, Pere Pau Ripollès, Ian Carradice and M. Spoerri Butcher. Some volumes are available online

- Vol. 1: From the death of Caesar to the death of Vitellius (44 BC-AD 69) - A. Burnett, M. Amandry and P.P. Ripolles (1992), (reprinted with corrections 1998).
- Vol. 2: From Vespasian to Domitian (AD 69-96) - A. Burnett, M. Amandry and I. Carradice (1999)
- Roman provincial coinage: supplement 1 - A. Burnett, M. Amandry and P.P. Ripolles (1998)
- Vol. 7: De Gordien Ier à Gordien III (238-244 après J.-C.), Province d'Asie - M. Spoerri Butcher (2006)
- Vol. 10: Valerian and Gallienus through the year 12 of Diocletian (AD 253–295/6)

== Other catalogues relating to Europe (classical) ==
- 1814 - Veterum populorum et regum numi qui in Musèo Britannico adservantur - T. Coomb
- 1874 - Roman medallions in the British Museum - H. A. Grueber
- 1910 - Coins of the Roman Republic in the British Museum - H. A. Grueber
  - vol. 1 Aes rude, aes signatum, aes grave, and coinage of Rome from B.C. 268
  - vol. 2 Coinages of Rome (continued), Roman Campania, Italy, The social war and the provinces
  - vol. 3. Tables of finds and cognomina, indexes, plates, etc (2nd edition 1970, prepared by R. A. G. Carson & M. H. Crawford)
- 1987-1995 - Catalogue of the Celtic coins in the British Museum: with supplementary material from other British collections - by D. Allen, edited by J. P. C. Kent and M. Mays
  - vol. 1: Silver coins of the East Celts and Balkan peoples
  - vol. 2: Silver coins of North Italy, South and Central France, Switzerland and South Germany
  - vol. 3: The bronze coins of Gaul
- 1991 - Coins of Alexandria and the Nomes: a supplement to the British Museum - E. Christiansen (1991), ed. V. H. Hewitt & M. J. Price (British Museum Occasional Paper, no. 77)
- 1991 - The coinage in the name of Alexander the Great and Philip Arrhidaeus: a British Museum catalogue, 2 vols - M. J. Price
- 1992 - Sylloge Nummorum Graecorum (Great Britain). The British Museum. Part 1, The Black Sea - M. J. Price
- 1996 - British Iron Age coins in the British Museum - R. Hobbs
- 2002 - Sylloge Nummorum Graecorum (Great Britain). The British Museum. Part 2, Spain - P. Bagwell Purefoy and A. Meadows
- 2010 - A catalogue of the Roman Republican Coins in the British Museum, with descriptions and chronology based on M. H. Crawford, Roman Republican Coinage (1974) - E. Ghey and I. Leins (eds.), with contribution by M.H. Crawford

== Other catalogues relating to Europe (medieval and modern) ==
- 1826 - Description of the Anglo-Gallic coins in the British Museum - T. Coomb
- 1860 - English copper, tin and bronze coins in the British Museum, 1558-1958 - C.W. Peck
- 1887 - Catalogue of English coins in the British Museum. Anglo-Saxon series, vol. 1 - F.C. Keary
- 1893 - Catalogue of English coins in the British Museum. Anglo-Saxon series, vol. 2 (Wessex and England to the Norman Conquest) - F.C. Keary and H.A. Grueber
- 1908 - Catalogue of the imperial Byzantine coins in the British Museum, 2 vols - W. Wroth
- 1911 - Catalogue of the coins of the Vandals, Ostrogoths and Lombards and of the empires of Thessalonica, Nicaea and Trebizond in the British Museum - W. Wroth
- 1916 - Catalogue of English coins in the British Museum. The Norman Kings (2 vols) - G.C. Brooke
- 1951 - A catalogue of English coins in the British Museum. The cross-and-crosslets ('Tealby') type of Henry II - D.F. Allen
- 1966 - Sylloge of Coins of the British Isles. 8, The Hiberno-Norse coins in the British Museum - R.H.M. Dolley
- 1966 - The Carolingian coins in the British Museum - R.H.M. Dolley and K.F. Morrison
- 1986 - Sylloge of Coins of the British Isles 34, British Museum: Anglo-Saxon coins. Athelstan to the reform of Edgar, 924-c.973 - M.M. Archibald and C.E. Blunt
- 2010 - Paper money of England and Wales - C. Eagleton and A. Manopoulou (eds)
- 2020 - The Italian Coins in the British Museum, vol. 1: South Italy, Siciliy, Sardinia, ed. by Barrie Cook, Stefano Locatelli, Giuseppe Sarcinelli and Lucia Travaini (Edizioni d.Andrea S.N.C.) ISBN 978-88-98330-44-7.

== Other catalogues relating to Asia ==
- 1887 - The coins of the sháhs of Persia, Safavis, Afgháns, Efsháris, Zands, and Kájárs - R.S. Poole
- 1892 - Catalogue of Chinese coins from the VIIth century B.C., to A.D. 621, including the series in the British Museum - Terrien De La Couperie
- 1903 - Catalogue of the coins of Parthia - W. Wroth
- 1941 - Catalogue of the Muhammadan coins in the British Museum, Catalogue of the Arab-Sassanian coins (Umaiyad governors in the East, Arab-Ephthalites, ‘Abassid governors in Tabaristan and Bukhara) - J. Walker
- 1956 - Catalogue of the Muhammadan coins in the British Museum, Catalogue of the Arab-Byzantine and post-reform Umaiyad coins - J. Walker
- 1992 - A catalogue of sycee in the British Museum: Chinese currency ingots, c.1750-1933 - J. Cribb
- 1999 - Magic coins of Java, Bali and the Malay Peninsula, thirteenth to twentieth centuries: a catalogue based on the Raffles Collection of Coin-shaped Charms from Java in the British Museum - J. Cribb
- 1999 - Catalogue of the Aksumite coins in the British Museum - S. Munro-Hay
- 2004 - Money on the Silk Road: the evidence from Eastern Central Asia to c. AD 800, including a catalogue of the coins collected by Sir Aurel Stein - H. Wang
- 2010 - Catalogue of the Japanese coin collection (pre-Meiji) at the British Museum : with special reference to Kutsuki Masatsuna (British Museum Research Publication, no. 174) - S. Sakuraki, H. Wang, P. Kornicki, with N. Furuta, T. Screech and J. Cribb
- 2011 - Catalogue of Sikh Coins in the British Museum (British Museum Research Publication, no. 190) - Paramdip Kaur Khera
- 2017 - Charles Masson and the Buddhist Sites of Afghanistan: Explorations, Excavations, Collections 1832-1835 - Elizabeth Errington, British Museum Research Publication 215.
- 2017 - The Charles Masson Archive: British Library, British Museum and Other Documents Relating to the 1832–1838 Masson Collection from Afghanistan - Elizabeth Errington, assisted by Piers Baker, Kirstin Leighton-Boyce and Wannaporn Kay Rienjang, British Museum Research Publication 216.
- 2021 - Charles Masson: Collections from Begram and Kabul Bazaar, Afghanistan 1833–1838 - Elizabeth Errington, with contributions by Joe Cribb, Lauren Morris, Piers Baker, Paramdip Khera, Chantal Fabregues, Kirstin Leighton-Boyce and Wannaporn Kay Rienjang, British Museum Research Publication 219.
- 2024 - "The British Museum collection of money and medals of the Qing period", by Joe Cribb and Helen Wang, in Jessica Harrison-Hall (ed.), China's 1800s: Material and Visual Culture, British Museum Research Publication 241 (2024), pp. 150-161.
- 2025 - Kushan Coins and History: A Type Catalogue of Kushan, Kushano-Sasanian and Kidarite Hun Coins Based on the Collection of the British Museum, 2 vols - Joe Cribb and Robert Bracey, British Museum Research Publication 191.
- 2026 - From Morocco to the Coast of England. The Story of the Dom van Keulen and its Remarkable Cargo, ed. by Venetia Porter and David Parham. British Museum Research Publication 238. [The ship carried a cargo of Islamic gold coins and ingots]

== Other catalogues relating to medals and badges ==
- 1930 - A corpus of Italian medals of the renaissance before Cellini - G.F. Hill
- 1982 - A catalogue of the French medals in the British Museum, vol. 1, AD 1402-1610 - M. Jones
- 1988 - A catalogue of the French medals in the British Museum, vol. 2, 1600-1672 - M. Jones
- 2003 - Italian Medals c. 1530-1600 in British public collections (2 vols) - P. Attwood
- 2008 - Chairman Mao badges: symbols and slogans of the Cultural Revolution (British Museum Research Publications, no. 155) - H. Wang
