= George C. Brooke =

Numismatist

George Cyril Brooke
- Born: 1884
- Died: 1934 (aged 49–50)
- Occupation: Numismatist

George Cyril Brooke (1884–1934) was a British numismatist, specialising in the coins of England.

== Career ==
Brooke was a member of the British Museum Dept of Coins and Medals from 1908 to 1934, on the council of the Royal Numismatic Society, and the author of numerous books and publications. He was awarded the Medal of the Royal Numismatic Society in 1934 (posthumously).

== Publications ==
- 1912 The Edwinstowe find of Roman coins
- 1916 A Catalogue of English Coins in the British Museum: the Norman kings
- 1966 English coins – from the seventh century to the present day

== The Brooke Memorial ==
After Brooke's death, a number of people interested in his work subscribed to purchase a coin - a gold noble of Edward IV, and the last coin Brooke handled before he died - to be donated in his memory to the British Museum.

Subscribers

- J. Allan
- F.W. Armitage
- Messrs A.H. Baldwin & Sons
- A.E. Ganall
- C.E. Blunt
- L. Cabot Briggs
- H.H. Brindley
- W.A. Brooke
- Frank E. Burton
- Major P.W.P. Carlyon-Britton
- V.B. Crowther-Beynon
- H.J. Dakers
- H. Daniels
- The Essay Club
- Sir Arthur Evans
- Lady Evans
- Miss Farquhar
- L. Forrer
- Messrs Glendining & Co
- Lord Grantley
- S.W. Grose
- G.C. Haines
- Christopher Hawkes
- Sir George Hill
- Norman Hill
- Horace H. King
- The Kent Numismatic Society
- Robert Kerr
- L.A. Lawrence
- E. Thurlow Leeds
- H.M. Lingford
- Dr A.H. Lloyd
- R. Cyril Lockett
- Prof T.O. Mabbott
- Sir George Macdonald
- H. Mattingly
- J. Mavrogordato
- J. Grafton Milne
- Ivo Pakenham
- Sir Charles Peers
- J.W.E. Pearce
- C.W. Phillips
- F.N. Pryce
- Prof E.J. Rapson
- E.S.G. Robinson
- Dr Kenneth Rogers
- V.J.E. Ryan
- F.S. Salisbury
- A.C. Savin
- B.A. Seaby
- J.S. Shirley-Fox (in memory of H.B. Earle-Fox)
- Messrs Spink & Son Ltd
- W.G. Smith
- H.W. Taffs
- A.B. Tonnochy
- Monsieur Victor Tourneur
- Monsieur A. Visart de Bocarme
- J. Walker
- Percy H. Webb
- Dr & Mrs Mortimer Wheeler
- R.B. Whitehead
- Miss M.E. Wood
- H. Nelson Wright
