= Martin Price (numismatist) =

British numismatist and antiquarian seller

Martin Jessop Price (27 March 1939 – 28 April 1995) was a British numismatist who was made a Merit Deputy Keeper of the British Museum in 1978, a corresponding member of the German Archaeological Institute and was a visiting fellow at the Institute for Advanced Study in Princeton, New Jersey, 1986-87. In 1992 he was awarded the medal of the Royal Numismatic Society. He was considered a leading scholar in the field on Greek Coinage and his literature, focusing on all aspects of coinage in the Greek world, has received multiple awards. Such was his personal reputation that he became a leading international authority and an unofficial final court of appeal on the authenticity of Greek coins.

== Career ==
He was educated at King's School, Canterbury and conducted his research at Queens' College, Cambridge, where he graduated with a first in classics, under the supervision of Sir Edward Robinson. In 1961, he won a Greek government scholarship which introduced him to the British School of Athens. After completing the scholarship, he returned to England to complete a research fellowship at Downing College, Cambridge.

He spent most of his career at the British Museum. In 1966 he was appointed Assistant Keeper in the Department of Coins and Medals at the British Museum, under Kenneth Jenkins. During this time he worked on the museum's unrivalled collection of ancient Greek coins. He also spent a lot of effort designing the physical layout for the rebuilt department. In 1975 he initiated a new publication, Coin Hoards, which represented the first systematic attempt to record the vast quantity of new finds, eight volumes were published under his editorship. His work didn't go unnoticed and in 1978 he was appointed Deputy Keeper for the department.

Whilst working at the British Museum, he also served as Secretary of the Royal Numismatic Society for six years from 1977 to 1983.

From 1975 to 1994 he ran single-handed a graduate seminar on Greek numismatics at London University.

He served as chairman of the British Academy's Sylloge Nummorum Graecorum project and published four volumes in the series.

In September 1994 he left the British Museum and returned to the British School of Athens and became its director. He was considered well-suited to the role due to his temperance and experience. Unfortunately, he was unable to fully embrace the position due to his untimely death less than a year later, in April 1995.

== Personal life ==
Martin Jessop Price had a lifelong connection with Greece and became fluent in modern Greek whilst studying at the British School of Athens in 1961. In 1965, whilst completing a research fellowship at Downing College, he met his future wife Maria Xenakis. The pair instantly had a connection, with Maria being surprised by his fluency in Greek, and married shortly after. The pair had three children, two sons and a daughter. He, and his wife, were well known amongst friends for their legendary hospitality, with Martin's colleagues even referring to him having an unofficial taxi-service.

Price could simultaneously exasperate and endear himself to his friends through his habit of disagreeing point-blank with them, and then completely reversing his position five minutes later. But his enthusiasm and energy were an inspiration to his colleagues. His enthusiasm meant it was typical that he was willing to throw himself into a project so unrewarding but so necessary.

== Legacy ==
Aside from leaving behind his academic work, a fund was set up in his name by the Royal Numismatic Society. The Martin Price Fund for Ancient Greek Numismatics was created in 1997 to help fund young researchers to conduct studies that focus on coins from the Greek world. The awards normally consist of one or multiple grants that are used to offset research costs, such as travel and accommodation as well as provide support for attending and reading papers at colloquia and seminars.

== Notable Work ==
- Coins of the Macedonians
- The Seven Wonders of The Ancient World
- Coinage in the Greek World
- Coins and their cities: Architecture on the ancient coins of Greece, Rome, and Palestine
- The coinage in the name of Alexander the Great and Philip Arrhidaeus: a British Museum catalogue
