= Kevin Leahy (archaeologist) =

British archaeologist

Kevin Leahy FSA
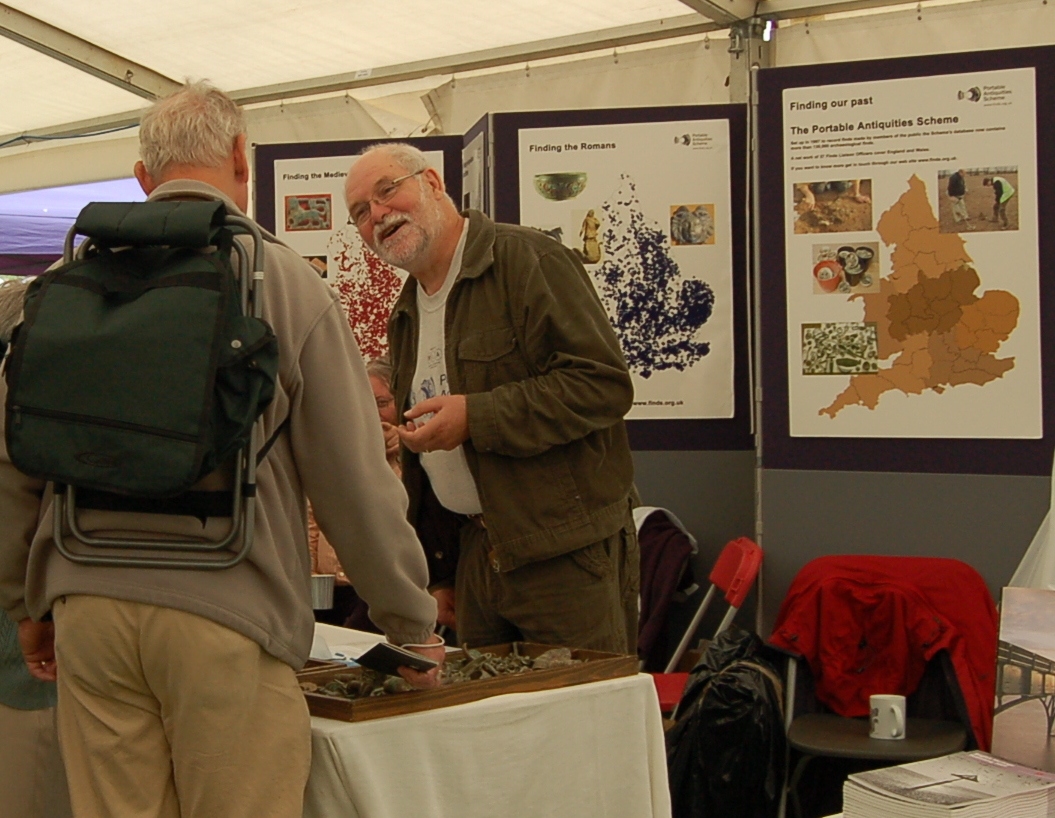
- Leahy talking to a member of the public about PAS finds, 2009
- Born: 1946 (age 79–80)

Academic background
- Education: University of Nottingham

Academic work
- Discipline: Archaeology
- Sub-discipline: Medieval archaeology; Early Medieval Period; small finds
- Institutions: North Lincolnshire Museum; Portable Antiquities Scheme

Kevin Anthony Leahy FSA (born 1946) is a British archaeologist and small finds specialist. He is the National Finds Adviser for early-medieval metalwork for the Portable Antiquities Scheme (PAS). He was elected as a Fellow of the Society of Antiquaries of London on 8 May 1987. Leahy was involved in the research and publication of the Staffordshire Hoard.

== Select publications ==
- Leahy, K. 2003. Anglo-Saxon crafts. Stroud, Tempus.
- Leahy, K. 2007. Interrupting the pots : the excavation of Cleatham Anglo-Saxon cemetery, North Lincolnshire. York, Council for British Archaeology.
- Leahy, K. 2007. The Anglo-Saxon kingdom of Lindsey. Stroud, Tempus.
- Leahy, K. and Bland, R. 2009. The Staffordshire hoard. London, British Museum.
