= Peter A. Clayton =

British archaeologist and numismatist

Peter Arthur Clayton (born 1937) is a British archaeologist and numismatist, and the former managing editor of British Museum Publications.

Born in 1937, Clayton’s early career was as a chartered librarian in the Islington Public Libraries, from 1954 to 1958, and then in the St. Marylebone Public Libraries until 1963; from then until 1974 he was archaeology editor with Thames & Hudson, then until 1979 was managing editor at British Museum Publications.

Clayton was president of the British Association of Numismatic Societies (BANS) from 1987 to 1995.

Clayton has written extensively on the ancient world and ancient Egypt in particular and has produced a number of books for children.

Clayton was a member of the British government's Treasure Valuation Committee until 2014.

== Selected publications ==
- Chronicle of the Pharaohs. Thames & Hudson, London.
- Archaeological sites in Britain. Weidenfeld & Nicolson, London, 1976. ISBN 0297771159
- The rediscovery of Ancient Egypt: Artists and travellers in the Nineteenth Century. Thames & Hudson, London, 1982. ISBN 0500012849
- The seven wonders of the ancient world. 1990.Abingdon: Routledge
- The Valley of the Kings. Wayland, 1995. ISBN 0750214317
