= Roger Bland =

British curator and numismatist

Roger Bland CBE FSA
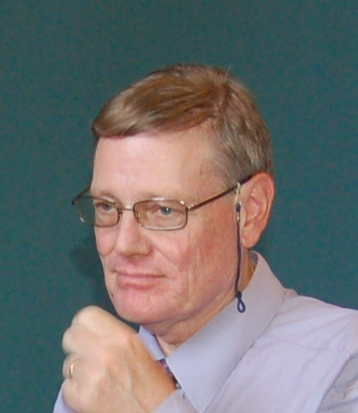
- Dr Roger Bland in 2010
- Born: 3 April 1955 (age 71)

Academic background
- Education: King's College, London

Academic work
- Discipline: Numismatics
- Sub-discipline: Coin hoards in Great Britain; Roman coinage
- Institutions: British Museum; McDonald Institute for Archaeological Research, University of Cambridge

Roger Farrant Bland (born 3 April 1955) is a British curator and numismatist. At the British Museum, he served as Keeper of the Department of Portable Antiquities and Treasure from 2005 to 2013, Keeper of the Department of Prehistory and Europe from 2012 to 2013, and Keeper of the Department of Britain, Europe and Prehistory from 2013 to 2015. Since 2015, he has been a visiting professor at the University of Leicester and a Senior Fellow of the McDonald Institute for Archaeological Research, University of Cambridge.

== Career ==
In 1979, Bland joined the British Museum as a curator in the Department of Coins and Medals. From 1994 to 2003, he was seconded to the Department of National Heritage (DNH) and then the Department for Culture, Media and Sport as British Museum advisor. He was deputy keeper of the Department of Coins and Medals from 2001 to 2005, and then keeper (ie head) of the Department of Portable Antiquities and Treasure from 2005 to 2013. He was additionally Keeper of the Department of Prehistory and Europe from 2012 to 2013, before serving as Keeper of the newly created Department of Britain, Europe and Prehistory from 2013 until his retirement from the British Museum in 2015.

Bland was 34th President of the Royal Numismatic Society, from 2018 to 2023.

On 11 August 2020, it was announced that he would chair the Treasure Valuation Committee for a five year term from August 2020 until August 2025.

== Personal life ==
Bland is an Anglican Christian. He was a churchwarden and treasurer of St Margaret's, Cley from 2015 to 2020, and has been a lay reader in the Diocese of Norwich since 2018.

== Honours ==
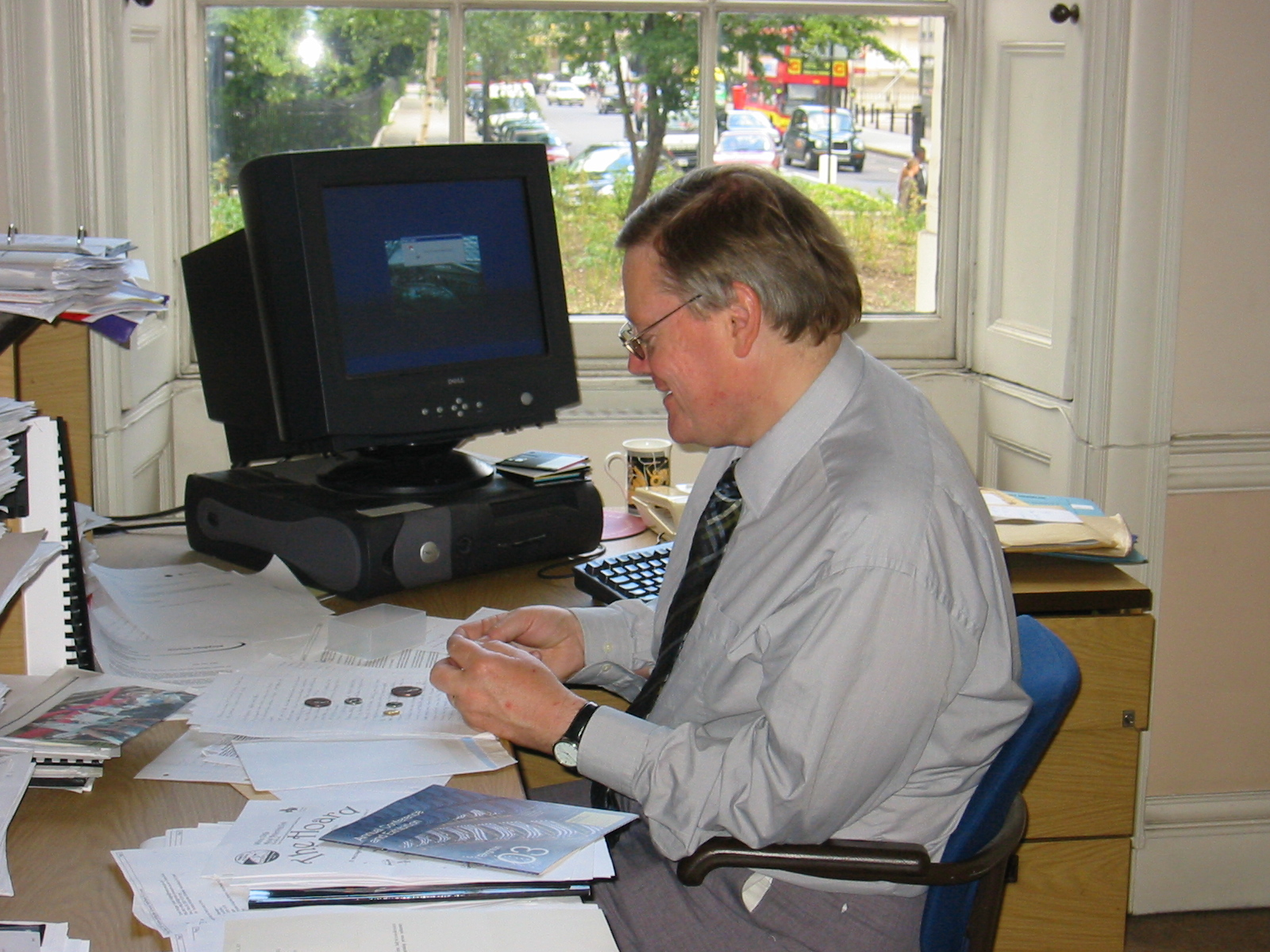
Bland identifying coins at his desk in 2003

- 6 May 1993: Fellow of the Society of Antiquaries of London (FSA).
- 2008: Officer of the Order of the British Empire (OBE) "for services to Heritage" during the 2008 Queen's Birthday Honours.
- 2014: Medal of the Royal Numismatic Society.
- 2016: President's Medal by the British Academy "for his contribution to the protection, and academic and public understanding, of Britain’s cultural heritage".
- 2017: Archer M. Huntington Award

== Selected works ==
- Roger Bland; Robert Carson (1982). Coin hoards from Roman Britain: The Blackmoor hoard. British Museum.
- Edward Besly; Roger Bland (1983). The Cunetio treasure: Roman coinage of the third century A.D. Published for the Trustees of the British Museum by British Museum Publications. ISBN 978-0-7141-0857-5.
- Roger Bland; Catherine Johns (1993). The Hoxne Treasure: An Illustrated Introduction. British Museum Press. ISBN 978-0-7141-2301-1.
- Sam Moorhead; Anna Booth; Roger Bland (2010). The Frome Hoard. British Museum Press. ISBN 978-0-7141-2334-9.
- Roger Bland; Xavier Loriot (2010). Roman and Early Byzantine Gold Coins Found in Britain and Ireland: With an Appendix of New Finds from Gaul. Royal Numismatic Society. ISBN 978-0-901405-59-3.
- Worrell, Sally; Jackson, Ralph; Mackay, Andrew; Bland, Roger; Pitts, Mike & Bradbury, Darren (January–February 2011). "The Crosby Garrett Roman Helmet". British Archaeology (116). Archived from the original on 1 February 2014.
- Leahy, Kevin; Bland, Roger; Hooke, Della; Jones, Alex & Okasha, Elisabeth (March 2011). "The Staffordshire (Ogley Hay) Hoard: Recovery of a Treasure". Antiquity. 85 (327): 202–220. doi:10.1017/S0003598X00067545.
- Kevin Leahy; Roger Bland (2014). The Staffordshire Hoard. British Museum Press. ISBN 978-0-7141-2342-4.
