= Treasure Valuation Committee =

UK government advisory committee

non-departmental public body overview
- Formed: 1997 (29 years ago)
- Jurisdiction: England and Wales
- Headquarters: The British Museum, Great Russell Street, London
- non-departmental public body executive: Professor Roger Bland, Chair
- Parent department: Department for Digital, Culture, Media and Sport
- Website: Official website

The Treasure Valuation Committee (TVC) is an advisory non-departmental public body of the Department for Culture, Media and Sport (DCMS) based in London, which offers expert advice to the government on items of declared treasure in England, Wales, and Northern Ireland that museums there may wish to acquire from the Crown.

The terms of reference of the TVC are laid down in the Treasure Act 1996 Code of Practice, which also details the principle of reward payments to finders and landowner for finds of Treasure which are acquired by museums. The TVC recommends to the Secretary of State the value of treasure finds which come before it, and also makes recommendations on the allocation of rewards and abatements of rewards where circumstances require. Minutes of its meetings are published on the website of the Portable Antiquities Scheme, after all of the cases discussed therein are concluded. The TVC meets at the British Museum but is independent of the museum.

== Members ==
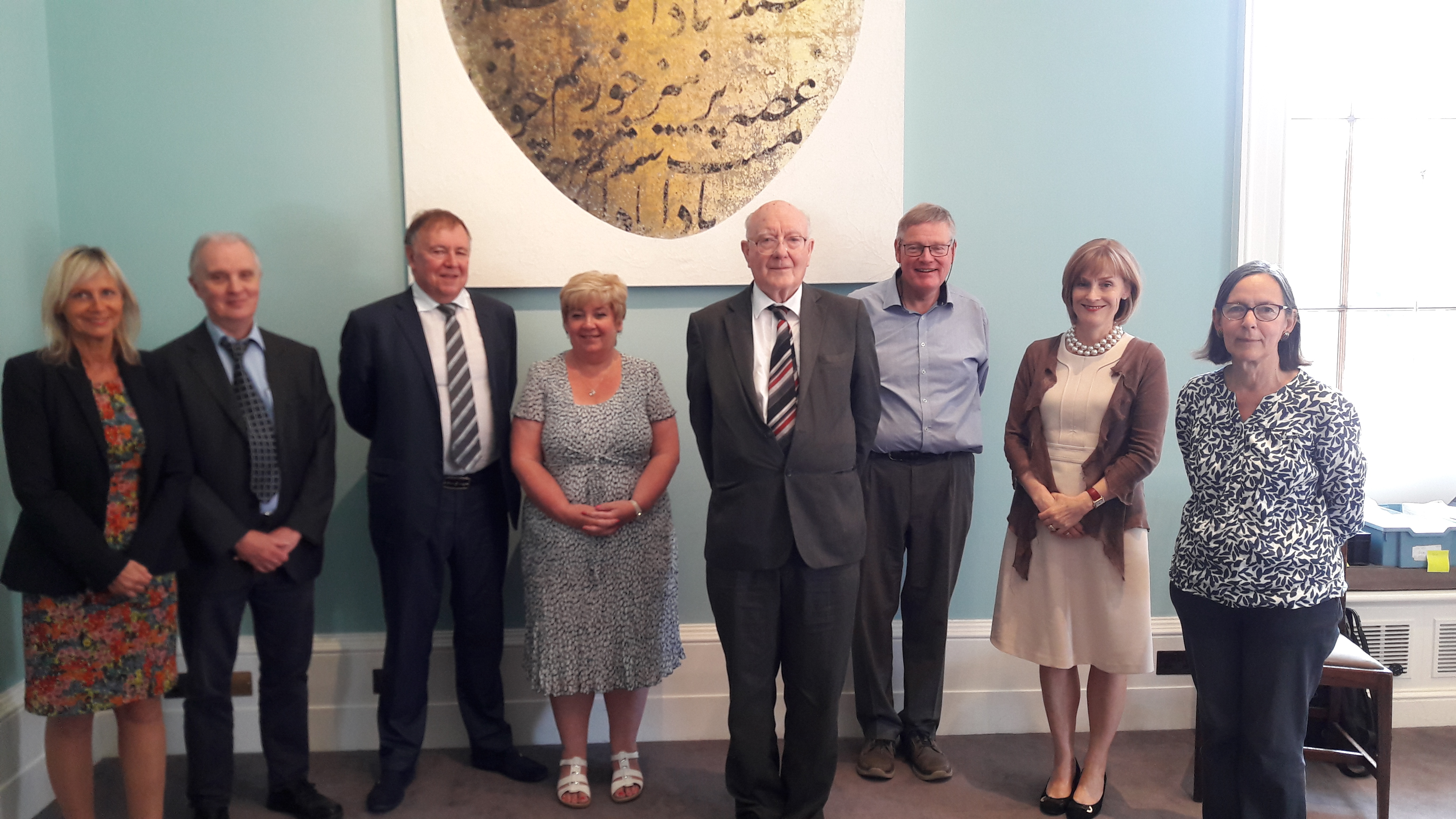
Members of the Treasure Valuation Committee, June 2018

Members of the committee are appointed by ministers in the DCMS. Terms of service are currently five years in length, with the possibility of renewal for a total length of service of 10 years. Members are not paid for their service.

- Chair: Professor Roger Bland – Former Keeper of the Department of Britain, Europe and Prehistory at the British Museum. President of the British Numismatic Society and vice-president of the Royal Numismatic Society.
- Gail Boyle – Senior Curator (Archaeology and World Cultures) for Bristol Culture
- Laura Burnett - a researcher currently based at the University of Exeter. She worked for the PAS for 12 years as a Finds Liaison Officer. She is an expert in Medieval and Post-Medieval finds.
- Megan Gooch – Head of the Centre for Digital Scholarship and Digital Humanities Support, Oxford University. Expert in numismatics.
- Christopher Martin – Proprietor and managing director of CJ Martin Coins and Ancient Art Ltd, and St James's Ancient Art. He is also Chairman of the British Numismatic Trade Association (BNTA), and of the Antiquities Dealers Association.
- Lucinda Orr – Barrister with Enyo Law, with extensive knowledge of antiquities collections and particular expertise in Medieval coins and jewellery.
- Dr Leslie Webster - Researcher and Emeritus Keeper of the Department of Prehistory and Europe at the British Museum. Expert in Early Medieval antiquities.

== History and former members ==
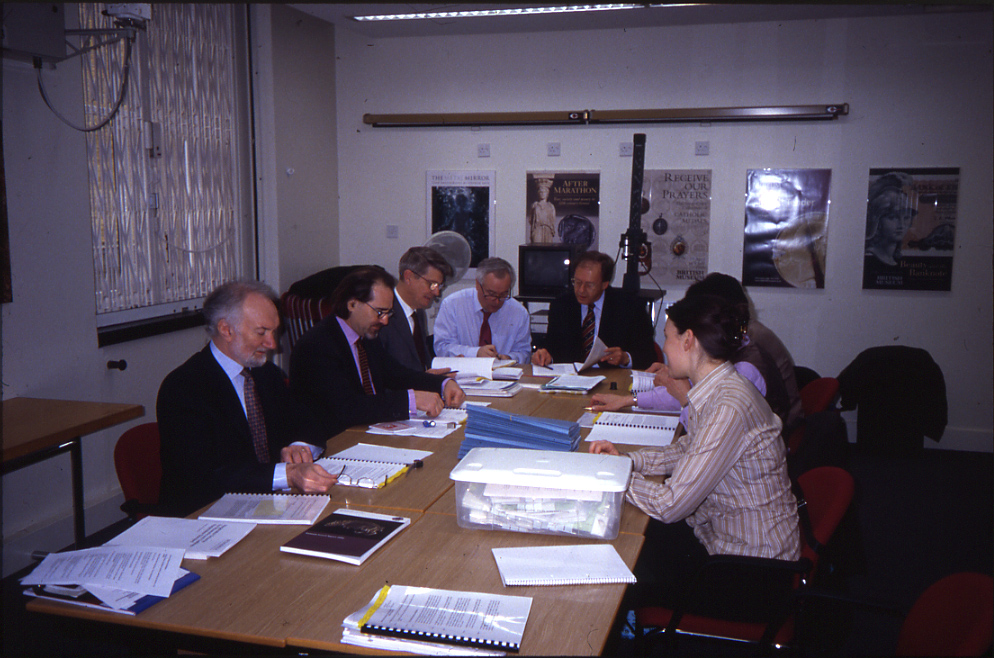
The Treasure Valuation Committee at work.

With the commencement of the Treasure Act on 24 September 1997, the Treasure Valuation Committee replaced the earlier Treasure Trove Reviewing Committee.

Former Chairs of the Committee:

- Ian Stewart, Ian Stewart, Baron Stewartby – Archaeologist and numismatist (1997-2001)
- Professor Norman Palmer – Expert in Art and Antiquity Law (2001-2011)
- Professor Lord Renfrew of Kaimsthorn – Senior Fellow of the McDonald Institute for Archaeological Research. (2011-2021)

Other former members of the TVC include:

- Trevor Austin – General Secretary of the National Council of Metal Detecting
- Harry Bain – Publisher and Editor of The Searcher magazine for metal detector users and amateur archaeologists.
- Jim Brown – Specialist with Dix Noonan Webb auctioneers
- Marian Campbell – Expert in medieval and post-medieval artefacts and former Senior Curator of Metalwork at the Victoria and Albert Museum
- Professor Ian Carradice – Expert in ancient coinage and former professor of Art History and Director of University Museum Collections, University of St Andrews.
- John Casey – Expert in ancient numismatics
- John Cherry – Former Keeper of the Department of Medieval and Later Antiquities at the British Museum
- Peter A. Clayton – Archaeologist and Numismatist, former Head of Antiquities at Seaby's Ltd.
- Thomas Curtis – Expert in ancient numismatics and affiliated with AH Baldwin and Sons coin dealers
- Dr David Dykes – Expert in medieval coinage and former Director of the National Museum of Wales from 1986 to 1989.
- Patrick Finn – Expert in Medieval coinage and affiliated with Whyte's auctioneers and AH Baldwin and Sons coin dealers
- Hetty Gleave – Partner at Hunters Solicitors in Lincoln's Inn. Specialist in cultural property law.
- Dennis Jordan – President of the National Council of Metal Detecting
- Arthur MacGregor – Expert in Medieval artefacts. Director of the Society of Antiquaries and curator in the Department of Antiquaries, Ashmolean Museum.
- Jack Ogden – An archaeologist and historian focusing on the development of jewellery materials and techniques
- Dr Tim Pestell – Senior Curator of Archaeology in the Norwich Castle Museum. Responsible for the post-Roman collections.
- May Sinclair – Expert in Medieval coinage, consultant numismatist at Spink and Son coin dealers

Well-known finds that have been valued by the TVC include the Ringlemere Cup, Vale of York Hoard and the Staffordshire Hoard.

== See also ==
- The Treasure Act 1996
