= John Walker (numismatist) =

Scottish numismatist

John Walker, CBE, FBA, FSA (4 September 1900 – 12 November 1964) was a Scottish numismatist. He was Keeper of the Department of Coins and Medals at the British Museum from 1952 to his death in 1964; there, he was responsible for initiating the modern catalogue of the museum's Islamic coins.

== Early life ==
Born in Glasgow, Walker was the son of a carpenter. He attended the John Street School and the Whitehill School; he was briefly in the army during the end of the First World War and, on demobilisation in 1918, went up to the University of Glasgow; in 1922, he graduated with a first-class MA in Semitic languages. He then completed a teaching diploma at Jordanhill Training College before spending three years (1924–27) teaching at St Andrew's Boys School in Egypt. He returned to the University of Glasgow in 1927 as an assistant lecturer in Arabic, but then spent another three years in Egypt (1928–31), this time in the Ministry of Education.

== Career at the British Museum ==
On his return to the UK in 1931, he found work as an assistant keeper at the Department of Coins and Medals in the British Museum, where was tasked with cataloguing the Islamic coins. By this time, he had written entries in encyclopedias about Islam and had published a popular work on the Quran. He authored another volume on folkloric medicine in 1934. In 1937, he was also appointed to a lectureship in the Arabic language and epigraphy at SOAS, which he held alongside his appointment at the British Museum until 1947. The first volume of his catalogue of the museum's coins appeared in 1941. Work on the project stalled during the Second World War, the last four years of which saw Walker appointed to the Air Staff Intelligence. Returning to the museum in 1945, he was appointed Deputy Keeper of the department in 1949 and then Keeper in 1952. The second volume of his catalogue was published in 1956. His time was, however, also taken up by the physical rebuilding and organisational restructuring of the department in the 1940s and 1950s. With his health failing, no further volumes appeared.

Walker's achievement was substantial; he was recognised by the award of the DLitt from the University of Glasgow in 1942, the Huntingdon Medal of the American Numismatic Society in 1955 and the medal of the Royal Numismatic Society in 1956; he was elected a fellow of the British Academy in 1958 and appointed a Commander of the Order of the British Empire in 1963. He had also been secretary to the Royal Numismatic Society from 1948 to 1964 and co-editor of the Numismatic Chronicle from 1952 to 1964. He died, unmarried, on 13 March 1964.
