= Barclay V. Head =

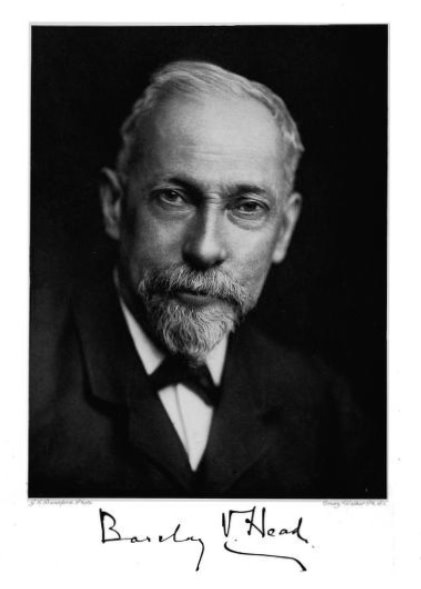
Barclay Vincent Head, 1844–1914.

Barclay Vincent Head (c. 1844–1914) was a British numismatist and keeper of the Department of Coins and Medals at the British Museum.

== Life ==
Head started work at the British Museum in 1864. He rose to be keeper of the Department of Coins and Medals at the British Museum (1893 to 1906). He published over many years eight of the thirty book catalogue of the museum's Greek coins. He also published a standard work on the subject which went to a second edition.

After his death, in his honour and in recognition of his work, his friends set up the Head Prize for Ancient Numismatics.

== Honours and awards ==
- 1907 - awarded the medal of the Royal Numismatic Society
- 1914 - elected Honorary Member of the Academia Romana, Bucharest

== Bibliography ==
The following is a select bibliography.

=== Books/catalogues ===
- British Museum Catalogue, Italy (with R. S. Poole and P. Gardner) (London, 1873)
- British Museum Catalogue, Sicily (with R. S. Poole and P. Gardner) (London, 1876)
- British Museum Catalogue, Thrace (with P. Gardner) (London, 1877)
- British Museum Catalogue, Macedonia (London, 1879)
- British Museum Catalogue, Central Greece (London, 1884)
- Historia Numorum, a Manual of Greek Numismatics (Oxford, 1887)
- British Museum Catalogue, Attica, Megaris, Aegina (London, 1888)
- British Museum Catalogue, Corinth and her Colonies (London, 1889)
- British Museum Catalogue, Ionia (London, 1892)
- British Museum Catalogue, Caria (London, 1897)
- British Museum Catalogue, Lydia (London, 1902)
- British Museum Catalogue, Phrygia (London, 1906)
- Historia Numorum, a Manual of Greek Numismatics. New and enlarged edition (assisted by G. F. Hill, George Macdonald, and W. Wroth) (Oxford, 1911)
- British Museum: Guide to the Principal Gold and Silver Coins of the Ancients from circ. 700 B.C. to 1 A.D. Second edition (London, 1881). [This is the second edition of the Guide published under a different title in 1880; it appeared in six "issues," each containing the whole text but only a portion of the 70 plates. Subsequent editions, some with only seven plates, appeared in 1883, 1886, 1889 ("third edition"), 1895 ("fourth edition")].
- British Museum: Guide to the Department of Coins and Medals in the British Museum (assisted by H. A. Grueber, W. Wroth, and E. J. Rapson) (London, 1901)
- British Museum: Guide to the Select Greek Coins exhibited in electrotype in the Gold Ornament Room (1872)
- British Museum: Guide to the Select Greek and Roman Coins exhibited in electrotype. New edition. (1880)

=== Articles ===
- "Account of the Hoard of Anglo-Saxon Coins found at Chancton Farm, Sussex", Numismatic Chronicle (1867)
- "Anglo-Saxon Coins with Runic Legends" (1868)
- "Notes on Ilion, numismatical and historical" (1868)
- Translation of Ernst Curtius "On the Religious Character of Greek Coins" (1878)
- "On some rare Greek Coins recently acquired by the British Museum" (1871)
- "Greek autonomous Coins from the Cabinet of the late Mr. Edward Wigan" (1873)
- "History of the Coinage of Syracuse" (1874)
- "Metrological Notes on ancient electrum Coins", Numismatic Chronicle (1875)
- "Notes on a recent Find of Staters of Cyzicus and Lampsacus", Numismatic Chronicle (1876, 1877)
- "The Coinage of Lydia and Persia" (International Numismata Orientalia, pt. III.) (1877)
- "Notes on Magistrates’ Names on Autonomous and Imperial Greek Coins", Numismatic Chronicle (1877)
- "Himyarite and other Arabian Imitations of Athenian Coins", Numismatic Chronicle (1878)
- "On an unpublished archaic Tetradrachm of Olynthus", Numismatic Chronicle (1878)
- "Note on a Find of Sicilian Copper Coins struck about the year 344 B.C.", Numismatic Chronicle (1879)
- "Origin and Transmission of some of the principal Ancient Systems of Weight", Journal of the Institute of Bankers (1879)
- "A Himyaritic Tetradracm and the Trésor de San'â", Numismatic Chronicle (1880)
- "History of the Coinage of Ephesus", Numismatic Chronicle (1880, 1881)
- "Chronological Sequence of the Coinage of Boeotia", Numismatic Chronicle (1881)
- "The Coins of Ancient Spain", Numismatic Chronicle (1882)
- "Coinage of Alexander: an explanation", Numismatic Chronicle (1883)
- "Remarks on two Unique Coins of Aetna and Zancle", Numismatic Chronicle (1883)
- "Greek and Roman Coins", in L. Jewitt's English Coins and Tokens (1886)
- "The Coins found at Naukratis. In W. M. F. Petrie’s Naukratis (Egypt Exploration Fund) (1886)
- "Coins discovered on the site of Naukratis (reprint of the preceding, with introductory remarks)", Numismatic Chronicle (1886)
- "Electrum Coins and their Specific Gravity", Numismatic Chronicle (1887)
- "Germanicopolis and Philadelphia in Cilicia", Numismatic Chronicle (1888)
- "Notanda et Corrigenda. I. Ν or Μ on Athenian Coins. II. Two misread coins of Ephesus. III. Philadelphia Lydiae. IV. Lydian Gold Coinage", Numismatic Chronicle (1889)
- "Apollo Hikesios", Journal of Hellenic Studies (1889)
- "Archaic Coins probably of Cyrene", Numismatic Chronicle (1891)
- "Coins recently attributed to Eretria", Numismatic Chronicle (1893)
- "The Initial Coinage of Athens", Numismatic Chronicle (1893)
- "Ιστρορια των Νομισματων ητοι Εγχειριδιον Ελληνικης Νομισματικης μεταφρασθεν .... και συμπληρωθεν υπο Ιωαννου Ν. Σβορωνου, 2 vols. and plates (Athens, 1898)
- "The Earliest Graeco-Bactrian and Graeco-Indian Coins", Numismatic Chronicle (1906)
- "Ephesian Tesserae", Numismatic Chronicle (1908)
- "British Museum: Coins discovered in the British Museum Excavations at Ephesus" (The Archaic Artemisia) (1908)
