= Andrew Burnett =

British numismatist and museum curator

Andrew Burnett CBE FSA FBA
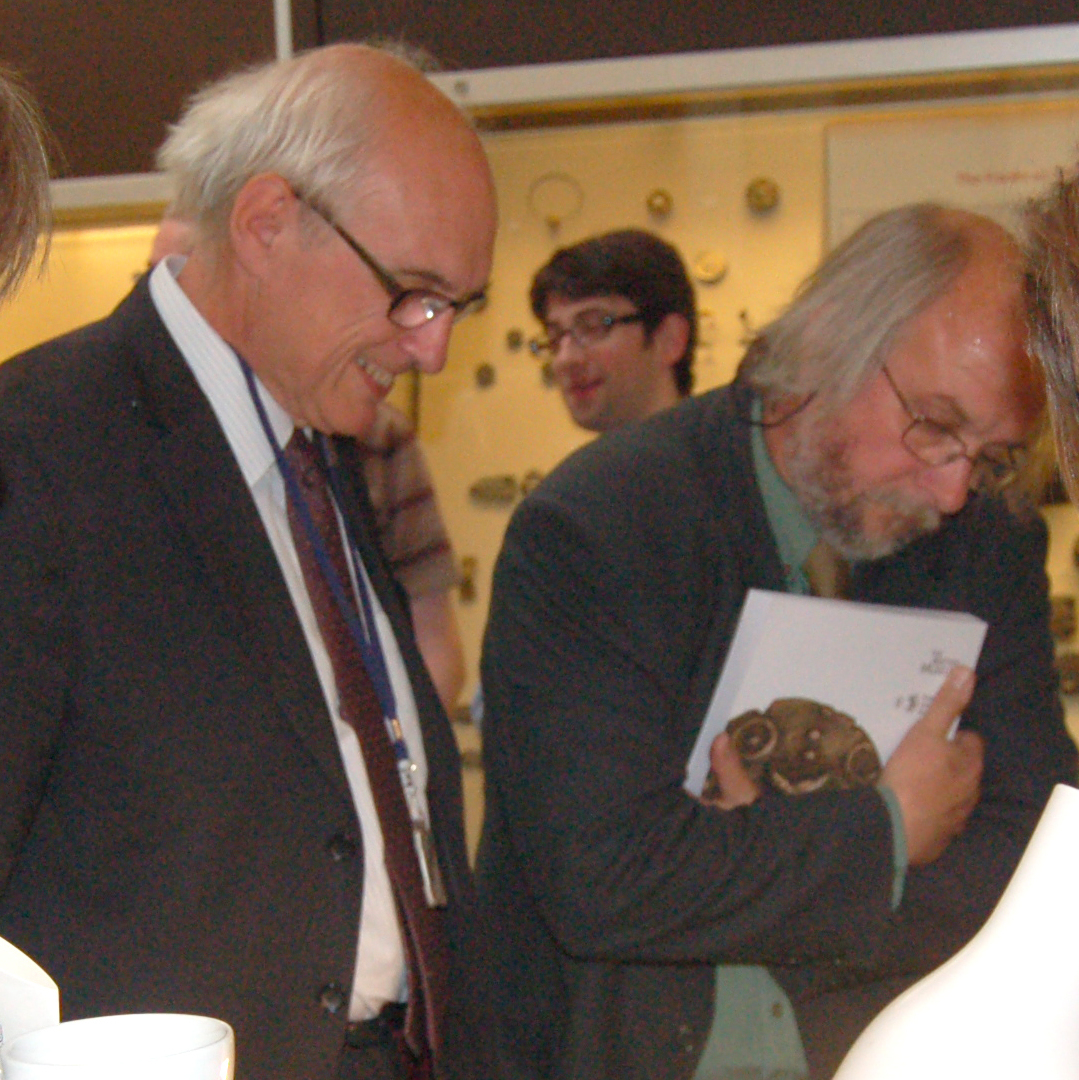
- Burnett (left) in 2011
- Born: 23 May 1952 (age 74)

Academic background
- Education: Balliol College, Oxford; Institute of Archaeology

Academic work
- Discipline: Numismatics
- Sub-discipline: Roman coinage
- Institutions: Department of Coins and Medals, British Museum; University College London

Andrew Michael Burnett, CBE, FSA, FBA (born 23 May 1952, Chichester) is a British numismatist and museum curator, who specialises in Roman coins. He was Deputy Director of the British Museum from 2003 to 2013, and Keeper of its Department of Coins and Medals from 1992 to 2003. He was president of the Royal Numismatic Society from 2013 to 2018.

== Early life and education ==
Burnett was born on 23 May 1952 to Margaret and Sir John Harrison Burnett. He was educated at Fettes College, a private school in Edinburgh, Scotland. He studied Literae Humaniores (ancient history and philosophy) at Balliol College, Oxford, graduating with a Bachelor of Arts (BA) degree. He continued his studies at the Institute of Archaeology, graduating from the University of London with a Doctor of Philosophy (PhD) degree.

== Career ==
In 1974, Burnett joined the British Museum as a research assistant in the Department of Coins and Medals. He was made assistant keeper in 1979, promoted to deputy keeper in 1990, before finally serving as keeper and head of department from 1992 to 2003. He was then Deputy Director of the British Museum from 2002 to 2013. In 2013, he was appointed an honorary professor at University College London.

In addition to his museum work, he has been active in the Royal Numismatic Society: he was secretary from 1983 to 1990, vice-president from 1999 to 2004, and served as its president from 2013 to 2018. He was an honorary vice-president from 2019-2023. He was also President of The Roman Society from 2008 to 2012, and President of the International Numismatic Commission from 1997 to 2003.

== Honours ==
On 6 May 1982, Burnett was elected a Fellow of the Society of Antiquaries of London (FSA). In 2003, he was elected a Fellow of the British Academy (FBA), the United Kingdom's national academy for the humanities and social sciences. In the 2012 New Year Honours, he was appointed Commander of the Order of the British Empire (CBE) "for services to the British Museum and numismatics". In 2020, he was awarded the Derek Allen Prize by the British Academy "for his outstanding contribution to the development of the study of coinage of the Roman Empire and a career of public service".

A Festschrift was published in his honour in 2015. It was edited by Roger Bland and Dario Calomino, and was titled "Studies in Ancient Coinage in Honour of Andrew Burnett".

== Selected works ==
- Burnett, Andrew (1987). Coinage in the Roman world. London: Spink & Son Ltd. ISBN 978-0900652844.
- Burnett, Andrew (1991). Coins (Interpreting the Past). Berkeley, CA: University of California Press. ISBN 978-0520076280.
- Burnett, Andrew; Reeve, John, eds. (2001). Behind the scenes at the British Museum. London: British Museum Press. ISBN 978-0714121963.
- The Hidden Treasures of this Happy Island: A History of Numismatics in Britain from the Renaissance to the Enlightenment, 3 vols (Spink & Son Ltd, London, 2020. ISBN 0-901405-36-1)
