= Stanley Robinson (numismatist) =

English numismatist

Sir Edward Stanley Gotch Robinson, FBA (1887–1976), usually known as Sir Stanley Robinson, was a numismatist specializing in Greek and Roman coins. He served as Keeper of the Department of Coins and Medals at the British Museum.

== Biography ==
Robinson studied at Clifton College, Bristol, and Christ Church, Oxford. He joined the British School in Athens from 1910 to 1911, and subsequently worked at the Department of Coins and Medals at the British Museum starting in 1912. He enlisted in the army in 1914 but was wounded in combat in France. After a period at the Home Office, he returned to the British Museum and eventually became Deputy Keeper in 1936. In 1949, he assumed the position of Keeper (Head) of the Department, serving until 1952. He was then appointed Reader in Numismatics, at the University of Oxford, and advised art collector Calouste Gulbenkian on his numismatic collection which is now on display in the Calouste Gulbenkian Museum. He retired in 1955, but continued to offer his expertise as an advisor in the Heberden Coin Room at the Ashmolean Museum, Oxford, to which he endowed his own collection in 1964. The ESG Robinson Trust remains active in supporting the field of numismatics.

He married Pamela Horsley in 1917.

== Awards and honours ==
- 1910 Winner of the Barclay Head Prize
- 1955 Awarded an honorary doctorate from the University of Oxford
- 1972 Robinson was knighted

== Selected publications ==
- 1911 "Inscriptions from Lycia", Journal of Hellenic Studies 34 (1914), pp. 1–35 (with H.A. Ormerod).
- 1914 "Coins from Lycia and Pamphylia." Journal of Hellenic Studies 34 (1914), pp. 36–46.
- 1915 "Quaestiones Cyrenaicae", Numismatic Chronicle, 4th series, no. 15 (1915), pp. 53–104, 137–178, 249–293.
- 1920 "A find of coins of Sinope", Numismatic Chronicle, 4th series, no. 20 (1920), pp. 1–16.
- 1927 Catalogue of the Greek coins of Cyrenaica (London: British Museum).
- 1931 The Collection of Capt. E.G. Spencer-Churchill, M.C., of Northwick Park [and] The Salting Collection in the Victoria and Albert Museum (London: H. Milford, Oxford University Press).
- 1931 Sylloge Nummorum Graecorum (British Academy).
- 1933 (with Harold Mattingly) The Date of the Roman Denarius and Other Landmarks in Early Roman Coinage (London: H. Milford).
- 1933 Lloyd, Albert Hugh. The Lloyd Collection (London: H. Milford, Oxford University Press).
- 1936 (with John Allan and Harold Mattingly) Transactions of the International Numismatic Congress, Royal Numismatic Society.
- 1936 The Newnham Davis Coins in the Wilson Collection of Classical and Eastern Antiquities, Marischal College, Aberdeen (London: H. Milford, Oxford University Press)
- 1937 "A gold comb – or pin-head from Egypt", Journal of Hellenic Studies 57 (1937), p. 79.
- 1946 "Rhegion, Zankle-Messana and the Samians", Journal of Hellenic Studies 66 (1946), pp. 13–20.
- 1951 "The coins from the Ephesian Artemision reconsidered", Journal of Hellenic Studies 71 (1951), pp. 156–67.
- 1958 The Beginnings of Achaemenid Coinage, Numismatic Chronicle 18 (1958), pp. 187–93.
- 1973 "A hoard of Greek coins from Southern Anatolia?", Revue numismatique, 6th series, no. 15 (1973), pp. 229–237.

For a complete list of publications, see "Bibliography of Stanley Robinson's works 1914–1966" in Colin M. Kraay and G. Kenneth Jenkins (eds), Essays in Greek Coinage Presented to Stanley Robinson (Oxford: Clarendon Press), 1968, pp. 259–263.
