= John Allan (numismatist) =

British numismatist and Sanskrit scholar (1884–1955)

- Born: 8 August 1884; Bolton, East Lothian, Scotland
- Died: 29 August 1955 (aged 71)
- Education: University of Edinburgh; Leipzig University

John Allan, CB, FSA, FSA Scot, FBA (8 August 1884 – 29 August 1955) was a British numismatist and scholar of Sanskrit. Allan was a noted numismatist and produced the first systematic study of the coins the Gupta Empire, which remains a standard reference today.

== Biography ==
Allan was born in Bolton, East Lothian. His father, John Gray Allan, was the local schoolmaster. John had 2 sons John Gray Allan, (b:1915 Finchley, Middlesex) and James Law Allan (b:1918 Finchley, Middlesex). After studying at the universities of Edinburgh and Leipzig, Allan took up a position at the British Museum in 1907, eventually becoming the Keeper of the Department of Coins and Medals in 1931. He was also a lecturer in Sanskrit at University College London, 1907–1917, then at the School of Oriental Studies, 1920–1922, and after his retirement from the British Museum, at the University of Edinburgh, 1949–1955.

Allan was an active member of many learned societies. He was Secretary of the Royal Numismatic Society for almost forty years, 1908–1948, and editor of its journal, the Numismatic Chronicle, for almost thirty years, 1921–1950. He was Vice-President of the Society of Antiquaries of London and of the Society of Antiquaries of Scotland.

== Honours ==
Allan was awarded the Medal of the Royal Numismatic Society in 1936, the medal of the Numismatic Society of India in 1928 and again in 1937, and the Huntington Medal Award of the American Numismatic Society in 1949.

He was elected a Fellow of the British Academy in 1941, and was made a Companion of the Order of the Bath (C.B.) in the 1948 New Year Honours, and received the honorary degree of LL.D. from the University of Edinburgh in 1949.

== Publications ==
Allan wrote numerous books, articles, reviews and notices, many of which were published in the British Museum Quarterly, History of the Berwickshire Naturalists' Club, the Journal of Hellenic Studies, the Journal of the Royal Asiatic Society, the Numismatic Chronicle and the Numismatic Supplement to the Journal of the Asiatic Society of Bengal and the Museums Journal. He also contributed to the Encyclopaedia of Islam (1st edition), the Encyclopædia Britannica (14th edition), the Encyclopaedia of Religion and Ethics (1914), and the Chambers's Encyclopaedia (1950). The following is a selection of his publications:

=== Books ===
- Catalogue of the Coins of the Gupta Dynasties and of Sasanka, King of Gauda (London, 1914)
- (ed.) Catalogue of the Coins in the Indian Museum, Calcutta, IV (Oxford, 1928)
- (with T. Wolseley Haig and H.H. Dodwell) The Cambridge Shorter History of India (Cambridge, 1934)
- Catalogue of the Coins of Ancient India (London, 1936)
- (ed., with H. Mattingly and E.S.G. Robinson) Transactions of the International Numismatic Congress, 1936 (London, 1938)

=== Articles on Asian coins and medals ===
- "The Coinage of Assam", in Numismatic Chronicle (1909) 300–301
- "Notes on the Coinage of Muhammad Ali", in Numismatic Chronicle (1910) 325–326
- "Some Rare Coins of the Pathan Sultans of Delhi", in Numismatic Chronicle (1911) 698–700
- "Some Rare Mughal Coins", in Numismatic Supplement to the Journal of the Asiatic Society of Bengal (1911), 701–703
- "The Coinage of the Maldive Islands with some Notes on the Cowrie and Larin", in Numismatic Chronicle (1912) 313–321
- "A Rupee Struck by George Thomas", in Numismatic Chronicle (1912) 129–130
- "A Brief Survey of the Coinages of Asia from the earliest times (700 BC) to the present day", in J.G. Bartholomew, A Literary and Historical Atlas of Asia (1914) 99–118
- "Offa's Imitation of an Arab Dinar", in Numismatic Chronicle (1914) 77–89
- "A Note on the Name Kushan", in Journal of the Royal Asiatic Society (1914) 403–411
- "The Legend of Samudragupta's Asvamedha Coin Type", in Numismatic Supplement to the Journal of the Asiatic Society of Bengal (1914), 255–256
- "Unpublished Coins of the Caliphate", Numismatic Chronicle (1919) 194–198
- "Indian Coins acquired by the British Museum", Numismatic Chronicle (1921) 333–348
- "Appendix B", in Aurel Stein, Serindia, vol. 3 (1921) 1340–1350
- "Indian Coins acquired by the British Museum", Numismatic Chronicle (1922) 200–213
- "Indian Coins acquired by the British Museum", Numismatic Chronicle (1923) 96–110
- (ed. with F.M.G. Lorimer) "Appendix B", in Aurel Stein, Innermost Asia (1928) 988–995
- "Indian Coins: Van Den Bergh Gift", in British Museum Quarterly (1929) 36–37
- "A Portrait Mohur of Akbar", in British Museum Quarterly (1930) 56–57
- "Appendix" in G. Yazdani, Ajanta, Pt. II (London, 1933) 57–64
- "Indian Coins acquired by the British Museum", Numismatic Chronicle (1934) 229–243
- A Guide to the Department of Coins and Medals in the British Museum, "Chapter XI, Muhammadan Coins" (London, 1934) 80–82
- "Medieval Muhammadan Coins", in British Museum Quarterly (1934) 50–51
- "A New Kushan Coin", in British Museum Quarterly (1934), 155–156
- "Indian Coins acquired by the British Museum", in Numismatic Chronicle (1937) 297–305
- "Chinese Decorations", in British Museum Quarterly (1937) 32
- "The Coinage of the Sãsãnians A Types" in A. Upham Pope's A Survey of Persian Art, i (Oxford, 1938) 816–818
- "Coins of the Moghul Emperor Akbar", in British Museum Quarterly (1938) 144
- "Indian Coins", in British Museum Quarterly (1940) 98
- "Notes on the Punch-Marked, Local Taxilan and Greek Coins" in Sir John Marshall's Taxila, ii (Cambridge, 1951) 853–63

=== Articles on European coins and medals ===
- "Naval Medals", in British Museum Quarterly (1931) 47
- "Medals by Charles B. Birch", in British Museum Quarterly (1932) 107–108
- "The Fletcher Collection of Irish Tokens", in British Museum Quarterly (1934) 51
- "A Rare Italian Medal", in British Museum Quarterly (1934) 156
- "A new Sterling of Lorraine", in Numismatic Chronicle (1935) 208
- "Scott's Stay at Hethpoll", in History of the Berwickshire Naturalists' Club (1935) 108–110
- "English Gold Coins", in British Museum Quarterly (1935) 135
- (with H.A. Grueber), "The Southsea Find of Fourth-century Silver Coins", in Numismatic Chronicle (1936) 292–303
- "The Barnett Collection of Pre-Conquest Coins", in British Museum Quarterly (1936) 124–127
- "Greek Coins", in British Museum Quarterly (1936) 127–128
- "The Brooke Memorial Gift", in British Museum Quarterly (1936) 128–129
- "Rare English Medals", in British Museum Quarterly (1936) 129
- "A Collection of Northumbrian Stycas in the possession of Sir Carnaby Haggerston", in History of the Berwickshire Naturalists' Club 289–91
- "Rare English Medals", in British Museum Quarterly (1937) 31–32
- "Greek and Roman Coins", in British Museum Quarterly (1937) 55
- "Italian Renaissance Medals", in British Museum Quarterly (1937) 124–125
- "Greek Coins", in British Museum Quarterly (1938) 4–5
- "Some Coins and Medals", in British Museum Quarterly (1938) 75–76
- "Roman Coins from Poole Harbour", in Numismatic Chronicle (1938) 300
- "Coinage in the Islamic Period" in A. Upham Pope's Survey of Persian Art, iii (Oxford, 1939) 2673–2677
- "Greek Coins", British Museum Quarterly (1939) 14–16
- "Roman Coins from Swine (East Yorks)", in Numismatic Chronicle (1940) 266
- "Greek Coins", in British Museum Quarterly (1940) 33–34
- "Some New Greek Coins", in British Museum Quarterly (1940) 95–97
- "Medals of War and Peace", in British Museum Quarterly 91940) 99
- "Recent Finds (Roman and English)", in Numismatic Chronicle (1943) 107–108
- "The 'To Hanover' Counter", in Numismatic Chronicle (1843) 108–110
- "A Find of Sovereigns from Derbyshire"', in Numismatic Chronicle (1945) 116
- "A Civil War Hoard from Whitchurch", in Numismatic Chronicle (1945) 124
- "The Mablethorpe (Lincs.) Find", in Numismatic Chronicle (1945) 165–166
- "Roman Coins from North Thoresby, Lincs.", in Numismatic Chronicle (1945) 166
- "A Find of Sceattas at Southampton", in Numismatic Chronicle (1946) 73
- "A Civil War Hoard from Canterbury", in Numismatic Chronicle (1946) 15
- "The Mint of Ayr", in Numismatic Chronicle (1947) 62–65
- "Ancient British Coins from Lincolnshire", in Numismatic Chronicle (1947) 65–68
- "Ilkeston Treasure Trove", in Numismatic Chronicle (1947) 185
- "Coins in Swedish Museums", in Museums Journal (1947) 194–196
- "The Snettisham Find", in Numismatic Chronicle (1948) 233–235
- "The Cam Brea Hoard of 1749", in Numismatic Chronicle (1948) 235–236
- "A Find of Saxon and Carolingian Coins", in Numismatic Chronicle (1948) 236
- "The Longton Find", in Numismatic Chronicle (1948) 236
- Bruce-Mitford, Rupert; Allan, John (June 1952). "Sutton Hoo—a rejoinder". Antiquity. XXVI (102): 76–82. doi:10.1017/S0003598X00023619. S2CID 163980192.
- "Note on Elibank Castle", in History of the Berwickshire Naturalists' Club (1953) 44–46

=== Other articles ===
- "Bibliography of Warwick Wroth", in Numismatic Chronicle (1912) 109–110
- (with L.A. Lawrence), 'Obituary and Bibliography of George Cyril Brooke', in Numismatic Chronicle (1934) 303–308
