= Ian Carradice =

British numismatist

Ian Carradice is an authority on the coinages of ancient Greece, Rome, Persia and Carthage, and the history of museums. He is the former professor of ancient numismatics at the University of St Andrews and the director of the museums of that university.

== Career ==
Carradice joined the British Museum's Department of Coins and Medals in 1977 where he worked as curator of ancient near eastern coins until 1989 when he joined St Andrews university. He became professor of ancient numismatics there and retired in 2012 when the university held a symposium in his honour.

Carradice is a member of the British government's Treasure Valuation Committee.

== Selected publications ==
- Ancient Greek portrait coins. British Museum Publications, London, 1978. ISBN 0714108499
- Coinage and finances in the reign of Domitian. British Archaeological Reports, Oxford, 1983. ISBN 0860542289
- Coinage in the Greek world. Spink, London, 1988. (With Martin Price) ISBN 0900652829
- The coin atlas: The world of coinage from its origins to the present day. Macdonald, London, 1990. (With Joe Cribb & Barrie Cook)
- Greek coins. British Museum Press, London, 1995. ISBN 0714122106
- The Roman imperial coinage. Volume II, part 1, From AD 69-96, Vespasian to Domitian. Spink, London. 2007. (2nd revised edition) (With Theodore V. Buttrey) ISBN 9781902040844
