= Nicholas Lowick =

British numismatist

Nicholas Manning Lowick (1940–1986) was a leading specialist in Islamic numismatics and epigraphy at the British Museum.

== Biography ==
Lowick was educated at Clifton College, and Christ's College, Cambridge, where he earned a First in French and German. He joined the Department of Coins and Medals at the British Museum in 1962, working with John Walker. From 1964, he began a prolific series of articles on the medieval coinages of Central Asia, India, Iran, the Persian Gulf, the Yemen and the near East, and was part of the team working on Siraf. On the strength of his publications he was promoted to Deputy Keeper in 1979. He died on 11 November 1986, aged 45.

Lowick was a member of the Royal Numismatic Society (Library Secretary, 1964–1981, Reviews Editor of the Numismatic Chronicle, 1975–1986, and a regular contributor to Coin Hoards). He was also a member of the British Institute of Persian Studies, and the Royal Asiatic Society.

== Selected publications ==
- 1968 “A Samanid/Kakwayhid ‘mule’”, American Numismatic Society Museum Notes XIV, pp. 159-162.
- 1977 (with S. Bendall and P.D. Whitting) The Mardin hoard : Islamic countermarks on Byzantine folles, A.H. Baldwin, London.
- 1983 “The wandering die of Nisapur: a sequel”, in American Numismatic Society Museum Notes XXVIII, pp. 187–193.
- 1985 Siraf XV. The Coins and Monumental Inscriptions, British Institute of Persian Studies, London.
- 1985 “Islamic Weights and Coins”, in John Hansman's Julfar: An Arabian Port.

After Lowick's death, his colleague Joe Cribb collected his papers and published them in the Variorum series:

- 1990 Islamic Coins and Trade in the Medieval World, by Nicholas Lowick, edited by Joe Cribb (Variorum Collected Studies, Series 318) -- This contains 19 articles, arranged in 3 sections: (1) Islamic Coins in Europe; (2) Coinage of Central Asia during the 10th and 11th centuries; (3) Coin finds and hoards and the trade of the Gulf and the Indian Ocean.
- 1990 Coinage and History of the Islamic World, by Nicholas Lowick, edited by Joe Cribb. (Variorum Collected Studies, Series 311)
