= G. Kenneth Jenkins =

British historian and numismatist

Gilbert Kenneth Jenkins (2 July 1918 – 22 May 2005) was a leading figure in 20th-century numismatics. He was the post-war generation's most important expert in the study of Greek coins and medals and would become Keeper of Coins and Medals at the British Museum in 1965.

Jenkins was born in Bristol, England and educated at Bloxham School and Oxford University. Jenkins's introduction to numismatics came during his time at Oxford, while he was studying Classics at Corpus Christi in the late 1930s. He attended the Heberden Coin Room in the Ashmolean Museum and was introduced to the subject under the guidance of Edward Robinson and Humphrey Sutherland. His studies were interrupted by the Second World War, during which he served as an officer in the Royal Artillery, from 1944 to 1946 flying as a reconnaissance pilot in South East Asia. He returned to Oxford to graduate in 1946, before starting work at the British Museum.

Shortly after arriving at the museum, Jenkins met and became friends with a young Indian scholar, A. K. Narain, who was studying at the School of Oriental and African Studies, writing his doctoral thesis on the coins of the ancient Greek kingdoms in the territories of modern Afghanistan, Pakistan and India. It was Jenkins’ involvement in this work that would lead to him eventually becoming Keeper of Coins and Medals at the museum in 1965.

During Jenkins's first decade in the British Museum he rapidly built his own expertise and reputation, developing the collection through new acquisitions which he regularly reported in The British Museum Quarterly, so that by 1956 he was promoted to the post of Deputy Keeper. In his second decade he shifted his focus to the western edges of the Greek world to focus on the ancient coinages of Sicily, North Africa and Spain.

In 1957 he published a study of a hoard of Carthaginian coins found in southern France. This piece of research revealed to him the poverty of scholarship on this important ancient region. He was introduced to the Celtic coinages of Spain by George Miles, doyen of oriental coinage at the American Numismatic Society (New York). After shorter articles on this topic, he undertook a huge research project on the precious metal coinages of Carthage (working with R. B. Lewis), which set out to create a firm chronology and system for Carthage's coinage. He was awarded the medal of the Royal Numismatic Society in 1975.

He married Cynthia Scott in 1939 and together they had one son and two daughters. He died in Richmond upon Thames, Surrey in 2005 at the age of 86.
