= Robert Carson (numismatist) =

British numismatist (1918–2006)

Robert Andrew Glendinning Carson, FBA (7 April 1918 – 24 March 2006) was a British numismatist.

== Life and career ==
Robert Carson was educated at Kirkcudbright Academy, He was awarded a first in classics at the University of Glasgow, where one of his teachers was Professor Anne S. Robertson, curator at the Hunterian Museum and a specialist in Roman coins. He served in the Royal Artillery in north-west Europe, rising to captain. He married in 1949 and had two children.

In 1947, he joined the British Museum's department of coins and medals as an assistant keeper. This continued his engagement with classics, and he learned Roman numismatics under the guidance of Harold Mattingly. In 1965 he was appointed deputy keeper. He became a leading expert on Roman coins, and rose to Keeper of Coins and Medals at the British Museum from 1978 to 1983.

He entered the museum's Roman coins on to its first computer database, a record which provided the basis for the Roman coin entries on the museum-wide Merlin collection database. He quickly became frustrated by the irrationality of the old common law under which only hoards of gold and silver coins received legal protection and, making use of new evidence from the metallurgical analysis of Roman coins, successfully argued that hoards of late Roman coins that contained a silver content as low as one or two per cent should be regarded as Treasure Trove. In this way, many important hoards which might otherwise have been dispersed were recorded and acquired by museums. The practice had to stop in 1982 when, as a result of a legal challenge, the Master of the Rolls, Lord Denning, decided that only objects with at least 50 per cent of gold or silver could be Treasure Trove. It took another 14 years before a new law, the Treasure Act, finally brought in an objective definition of treasure.

In retirement Robert continued to work on coins and supported the work of the coin departments in Sydney and Hobart museums and of the Australian Numismatic Society.

Robert Carson was portrayed in a numismatic roman à clef, The Coin Collectors (1997), by his friend and colleague the Belgian Pierre Bastien. "The chief curator was tall, with blond hair, and an angular face brightened by piercing eyes. His personality radiated kindness, tempered by a slight coolness, rather characteristic of the well-educated Englishman." It was an accurate description of Robert's appearance and his character, but not of his nationality.

== Major publications ==
During his first year at the museum Carson published his first two reports, on Roman coin hoards, in the Royal Numismatic Society's annual Numismatic Chronicle, and in the ensuing 55 years he wrote about 350 articles. His last, on Roman coin finds from Jordan, appeared in 2001. Many of these were published in the Numismatic Chronicle, which he edited from 1964 until 1973.

As editor from 1949, he oversaw and pushed to completion the 10-volume Roman Imperial Coinage, the standard reference for coinage of empire. In the tradition of cataloguing the British Museum collection, Robert also revised the five-volume Roman Imperial Coins series and added, in his own right, the sixth volume, covering AD 222–238, a masterful analysis of a complex series, based on his deep knowledge of the Roman mint system.

His knowledge was based on processing and publishing of details of coin hoards from Roman Britain. It underpinned analytical works, including his Late Roman Bronze Coinage (1960), compiled in collaboration with John Kent and Philip Hill. This volume opened up the identification and classification of bronze Roman coinage in the period 324-491 AD, a period marked by the volume and complexity of the coinage. It remains a standard work on problematic coinages of Constantine the Great and his successors.

In 1962 (revised in 1972), Carson published Coins, Ancient, Medieval and Modern, a work of general reference. In 1985 he published A History of the Royal Numismatic Society to mark its 150th anniversary. In 1990, he published his last major work, Coins of the Roman Empire, a volume in Methuen's "Library of Numismatics" series.

== Honours ==
He was elected to the Royal Numismatic Society in 1947, was awarded its medal in 1972, elevated to honorary fellowship in 1980 and served on its council for many years, as librarian, secretary and finally president (1974–79). He was elected to the British Academy (1980) and made an honorary doctor by Glasgow University (1983). He was also awarded medals and honours by France, Austria, Finland, the United States, Luxembourg and Australia, and was president of the International Numismatic Commission (1979–86).
