= Warwick William Wroth =

English numismatist (1858–1911)

Warwick William Wroth FSA (24 August 1858 – 26 September 1911) was a numismatist and biographer. He was Senior Assistant Keeper of Coins and Medals in the British Museum and one of the original contributors to the Dictionary of National Biography, with which he was associated almost until its completion.

== Life ==
Wroth was born in Clerkenwell, the eldest son of the Rev. Warwick Reed Wroth, vicar of St. Philip's Clerkenwell. He attended the King's School, Canterbury, where he received a classical training, and joined the staff of the British Museum as an assistant in the Department of Coins and Medals in July 1878.

== Publications ==
Wroth contributed to the series of British Museum Catalogues of Greek Coins, and wrote articles for the Journal of Hellenic Studies, the Numismatic Chronicle, The Athenaeum and The Classical Review. He also wrote a series of biographies of numismatists, medallists, coin-engravers which were published in the Dictionary of National Biography. The following list is a selection of his publications:

- Volumes in the series British Museum Catalogue of Greek Coins:
  - Crete and the Aegean Islands (1886)
  - Pontus, Paphlygonia, etc. (1889)
  - Mysia (1892)
  - Troas, Aeolia, and Lesbos (1894)
  - Galatia, Cappadocia, and Syria (1899)
  - Parthia (1903)
- Volumes in the series British Museum Catalogue of Roman Coins:
  - Imperial Byzantine Coins (1908)
  - Coins of the Vandals, Ostrogoths, and Lombards, etc. (1911)
- The London Pleasure Gardens of the Eighteenth Century (1896) (with his brother, E. A. Wroth)
- Cremorne and the Later London Pleasure Gardens (1907) (See Cremorne Gardens, London.)

See also the bibliography of Wroth's work, by John Allan.

Wroth was best known to the general public for his scholarly work on London Pleasure Gardens, published by Macmillan in 1896, in which he was helped by his brother, E. A. Wroth. Wroth had made this subject a speciality for many years, and had accumulated a considerable amount of curious and out-of-the-way material.
