= E. J. Rapson =

British numismatist and historian (1861–1937)

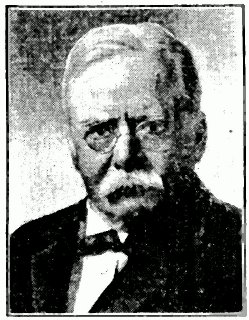
E.J. Rapson, 1861–1937

Edward James Rapson FBA (12 May 1861 – 3 October 1937) was a British numismatist, philologist and professor of Sanskrit at the University of Cambridge. He was a fellow of St. John's College. Rapson died following a sudden collapse at dinner at St. John's.

== Early life ==
Rapson was born at Leicester, the son of the Rev. Edward Rapson, later vicar of West Bradley, Somerset, where Rapson spent much of his childhood. He attended the Hereford Cathedral School and then St John's College, Cambridge, where he was elected a classical foundation scholar in 1883. He won the Brotherton Sanskrit Prize in 1884 and the La Bas Prize in 1886.

== Academic career ==
In 1887 Rapson was appointed assistant in the Department of Coins and Medals at the British Museum, and also elected a fellow of St. John's College. From 1903 he was Professor of Sanskrit at University College, London. In 1906 he left the British Museum and was appointed Professor of Sanskrit at St. John's. His application included eighteen testimonials. Following his successful appointment he remained there until his retirement in 1936 when he was succeeded by H.W. Bailey. His connection with the British Museum continued throughout his career and he assisted in the preparation of the Aurel Stein Collection.

== The Cambridge History of India ==
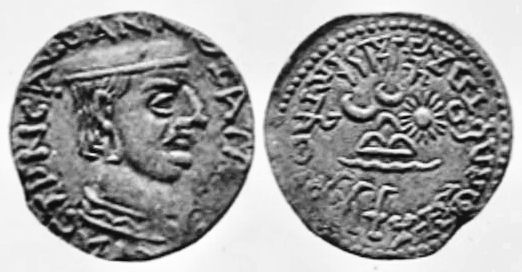
Coin of the Western Satrap Chastana, from Rapson's "Indian coins in the British Museum", 1908

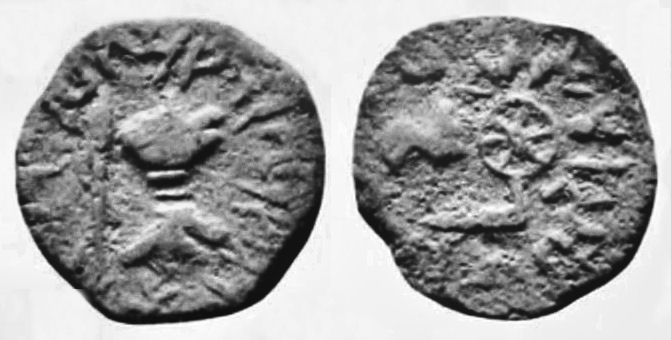
Coin of the Western Satrap Bhumaka, 2nd century CE, from Rapson's "Indian coins in the British Museum", 1908

Rapson edited the first volume of The Cambridge History of India, "Ancient India", where his expertise in coins was put to good use. The Times noted in their review of the volume that coin evidence provided some of the only sources for the earliest rulers mentioned, there being in many cases no surviving written sources. Rapson spent time on secondment from the College at the Department of Coins and Medals of the British Museum, where he was Assistant Keeper of Coins and Medals and was reckoned to have an uncanny ability to be able to identify ancient coins merely by feel.

He was known for his scrupulous attention to detail and for checking not only his own references carefully, but the references of every other contributor. He also invariably agreed to help fellow scholars with their work. These factors, possibly combined with increasing age, meant that Volume II of the History, for which he was the editor, was incomplete at the time of his death in 1937. He had confided to colleagues that the slow pace of the work meant that large parts of it needed to be updated to include the latest scholarship. For all these reasons, and possibly the upcoming war too, it remained unpublished.

== Other scholarly work ==
Rapson also deciphered and then edited various documents that his friend the archaeologist Aurel Stein had discovered in his 1900 expedition to Chinese Turkestan.

== Memberships ==
Rapson was honorary secretary of the Royal Numismatic Society and editor of their journal, the Numismatic Chronicle. He was a member of the Royal Asiatic Society, Bengal, and the Société Asiatique of France.

== Personal life ==
Rapson married Ellen Daisy Allen, the daughter of William Allen, of "The House", West Bradley, Somerset, in 1902. Rapson had spent much of his childhood in the village. Ellen died in 1921.

== Selected publications ==
Books

- The struggle between England and France for supremacy in India. The "Le Bas" prize essay for 1886. Trubner & Co., London, 1887.
- Indian coins. Trubner, Strassburg, 1897.
- Catalogue of the coins of the Andhra Dynasty, the Western Ksatrapas, the Traikutaka Dynasty and the Bodhi Dynasty. British Museum, London, 1908.
- Ancient India: from the earliest times to the first century, A.D. University Press, Cambridge, 1914.
- The Cambridge History of India. Vol. I Ancient India. University Press, Cambridge, 1922. (Editor)

Articles

- "Sources of Indian history: Coins" in Buhler's Encyclopedia of Indo-Aryan Research, Vol. II, Part 3, B. 1897.
- "The Græco-Indian Kings Strato I Soter and Strato II Philopator" in Journal of the Royal Asiatic Society, Vol. 37, 1905, No.1, pp. 164–7.
- "Coins of the Graeco-India Sovereigns. Agathocleia, Strato I Soter, and Strato II Philopater" in Corolla numismatica: Numismatic essays in honour of Barclay V. Head. Henry Frowde, Oxford University Press, 1906, pp. 245–258.
