= Numismatic Chronicle =

Journal

- Discipline: Numismatics
- Language: English

Publication details
- History: 1836–present
- Publisher: Royal Numismatic Society (United Kingdom)
- Frequency: Yearly
- ISO 4: Find out here

Indexing
- ISSN: 2054-9164 (print); 2054-9202 (web)
- JSTOR: https://www.jstor.org/journal/numischron

Links
- Journal homepage

The Numismatic Chronicle (NC) is an annual peer-reviewed numismatics journal of the Royal Numismatic Society (RNS). The journal was established in 1836. The journal publishes articles on coinage, exonumia, and paper money of any period. The Numismatic Chronicle is one of the highest-cited journals in numismatics.
