= Fina =

Fina or FINA may refer to:

- FINA (Fédération Internationale de Natation), the original name of World Aquatics, the international governing body for aquatic sports
- Fina (architecture), a narrow public space immediately alongside buildings
- Fina, a main character in the Skies of Arcadia video game
- Fina, a nickname for Trenbolone, an anabolic steroid
- FINA, the North American Forum on Integration (Le Forum sur l'Intégration Nord-Américaine)
- Fina (company), the United States and United Kingdom name for Petrofina, a Belgian petroleum company
- Saint Fina, a 13th-century saint
- "Fina" (song), a song by Bad Bunny from his 2023 album Nadie Sabe Lo Que Va a Pasar Mañana
- Fina Girard (born 2001), Swiss politician and youth climate activist
- Fontes Inediti Numismaticae Antiquae, a project aiming at collecting, reading, studying, and publishing unprinted textual evidence related to ancient coins created before 1800
- Cyclone Fina, a severe category 4 tropical cyclone impacting Australia in 2025

== See also ==
- Fin (disambiguation)
- Final (disambiguation)
- Finna (disambiguation)
- FINAA, Finnish Aviation Academy
