= Sibat (disambiguation) =

Sibat is a Filipino spear.

Sibat or SIBAT may also refer to:

- Israeli Defense Ministry's International Defense Cooperation Directorate
- Syndicat intercommunal des bus de l'agglomération thononaise, the company managing the Funiculaire de Thonon-les-Bains, France
- Ali Hussain Sibat, Lebanese and talk show host sentenced to death for sorcery in Saudi Arabia
- Ibn Sibat (died 1520), Druze chronicler

== See also ==
- Sibaté
- Sabat
- CBAT (disambiguation)
