= International Numismatic Council =

- Established: 1934; 92 years ago
- Legal status: Swiss association
- Purpose: International co-ordinating body for numismatists and related institutions
- Location: Winterthur, Switzerland
- President: Ute Wartenberg
- Vice-President(s): Prof. Maria Caccamo Caltabiano and Prof. Pere Pau Ripollès
- Website: inc-cin.org
- Formerly called: International Numismatic Commission

The International Numismatic Council (INC), formerly the International Numismatic Commission, is the international co-ordinating body set up to aid cooperation between numismatists and institutions within the field of numismatics, or related areas. It is since 2015 officially registered as an association and has its headquarters in Winterthur, Switzerland, co-located with the Münzkabinett und Antikensammlung der Stadt Winterthur.

== History ==
The body was founded in 1934 as the International Numismatic Commission, and became the International Numismatic Council in 2009. It has approximately 160 members from 38 countries. The Council's activities, which include the awarding of grants, patronage of research projects, and the organization of the International Numismatic Congress, are coordinated by a committee of nine members. These members are elected by representatives of member institutions at the International Numismatic Congress. The INC also maintains a newsletter.

The 15th International Numismatic Congress took place in Taormina in Sicily from 21–25 September 2015. The 16th Congress took place in Warsaw, September 2022.

== Notable people ==
Current members of the committee are:

- Ute Wartenberg (President)
- Aleksander Bursche (Vice-President)
- François de Callataÿ (Vice-President)
- Haim Gitler (Secretary)
- Bernhard Weisser (Treasurer)
- Fleur Kemmers
- Frédérique Duyrat
- Andrew Meadows
- Cecilia von Heijne

Former members:

- Andrew Burnett; president from 1997 to 2003.
- Maria Caccamo Caltabiano, vice-president from 2015 to 2022.

== See also ==
- International Numismatic Congress
