= Caltabiano =

Caltabiano is an Italian surname. Notable people with the surname include:

- Alfio Caltabiano ((1932–2007), Italian actor, screenwriter and film director
- Antonino Caltabiano (born 1955), Italian wrestler
- Giancarlo Caltabiano (born 1976), Canadian actor and entrepreneur
- Maria Caccamo Caltabiano, Italian numismatist
- Michael Caltabiano (born 1964), Australian politician
- Ronald Caltabiano (born 1959), American composer
- Tom Caltabiano, American comedian
