= List of storms named Fina =

The name Fina has been used for two tropical cyclones in the Australian region:

- Tropical Low Fina (2011) – stayed at sea and no deaths or damage were reported.
- Cyclone Fina (2025) – a Category 4 severe tropical cyclone that became the earliest cyclone to make landfall on the Australian mainland since Cyclone Ines in 1973

The name Fina was retired in the Australian region following the 2025–26 cyclone season.

== See also ==
- Cyclone Funa (2008) – a South Pacific Ocean tropical cyclone with a similar name
