= Fontes Inediti Numismaticae Antiquae =

Unprinted textual evidence related to ancient coins

The project Fontes Inediti Numismaticae Antiquae (FINA) is an international enterprise that aims at collecting, reading, studying, and publishing unprinted textual evidence related to ancient coins created before 1800.

== Overview ==
The background is twofold: first, a growing general interest in antiquarianism and historiography, of which numismatics forms an important part; second, a developing awareness that, so far, studies on antiquarian numismatics have been based mainly on printed books, which – though very numerous ‒ form only a small portion of the information available to scholars.

The end date 1800 has been chosen for the project not only for practical reasons, but also because it is close to the death of Joseph Hilarius Eckhel, the acclaimed “father of numismatics” (1737‒1798): at the end of his life, Eckhel published the eight-volume Doctrina numorum veterum (Vienna, 1792‒1798), which was to become the foundation work of ancient numismatics for the subsequent centuries and marks a watershed for the discipline.

In addition to the great amount of new information on numismatic topics that FINA provides, the project proves also important in a broader perspective as it adds information for reconstructing the history of ideas within each scholarly social network.

In 2015, FINA was officially presented to the scholarly community during the 15th International Numismatic Congress, Taormina, Italy gaining a lot of interest in the field and inspiring the creation of the project Fontes Inediti Numismaticae Orientalis (FINO), which was first introduced to the scholarly community in 2017, during the 5th Simone Assemani Symposium on Islamic Numismatics.

FINA has received the official support of the Union Académique Internationale (project no. 83), as well as those of the Austrian Academy of Sciences, the Royal Academy of Belgium, the Académie des Inscriptions et Belles-Lettres, the Berlin-Brandenburg Academy of Sciences and Humanities, and the Unione Accademica Nazionale.

== Founding committee of FINA ==
- HR Univ.-Doz. Dr. Michael Alram, Kunsthistorisches Museum, Vice-president of the Austrian Academy of Sciences, Vienna, Austria.
- Prof. Dr. François de Callataÿ, Bibliothèque royale de Belgique, Brussels, Belgium .
- Prof. Dr. John Cunnally, Iowa State University, USA.
- Dr. Ursula Kampmann, Lörrach, Germany.
- Dr. Federica Missere Fontana, Centro di Studi Muratoriani, Modena, Italy.
- Dr. Ulrike Peter, Brandenburgische Akademie der Wissenschaften, Berlin, Germany.
- PD Dr. Bernhard Woytek, Austrian Academy of Sciences, Vienna, Austria.

== Literature ==
- Daniela Williams, "Reflections on the history of numismatic research: exploring the life and work of Joseph Eckhel (1737-1798) through the lens of FINA (Fontes Inediti Numismaticae Antiquae)", in International Numismatic Council INC Compte Rendu 62 (2015), pp. 73‒78.
- François de Callataÿ, "Fontes Inediti Numismaticae Antiquae : présentation succincte d’un nouveau projet antiquaire", in Anabases, 23 (2016), pp. 163-168.
- François de Callataÿ,"Fontes Inediti Numismaticae Antiquae (FINA) a short presentation, in M. Caccamo Caltabiano et al. (eds.), XVth International Numismatic Congress. Taormina. Proceedings, I, Messina, 2017, pp. 95-99.
