= Cyclone Fina =

Category 4 Australian region cyclone

Severe Tropical Cyclone Fina
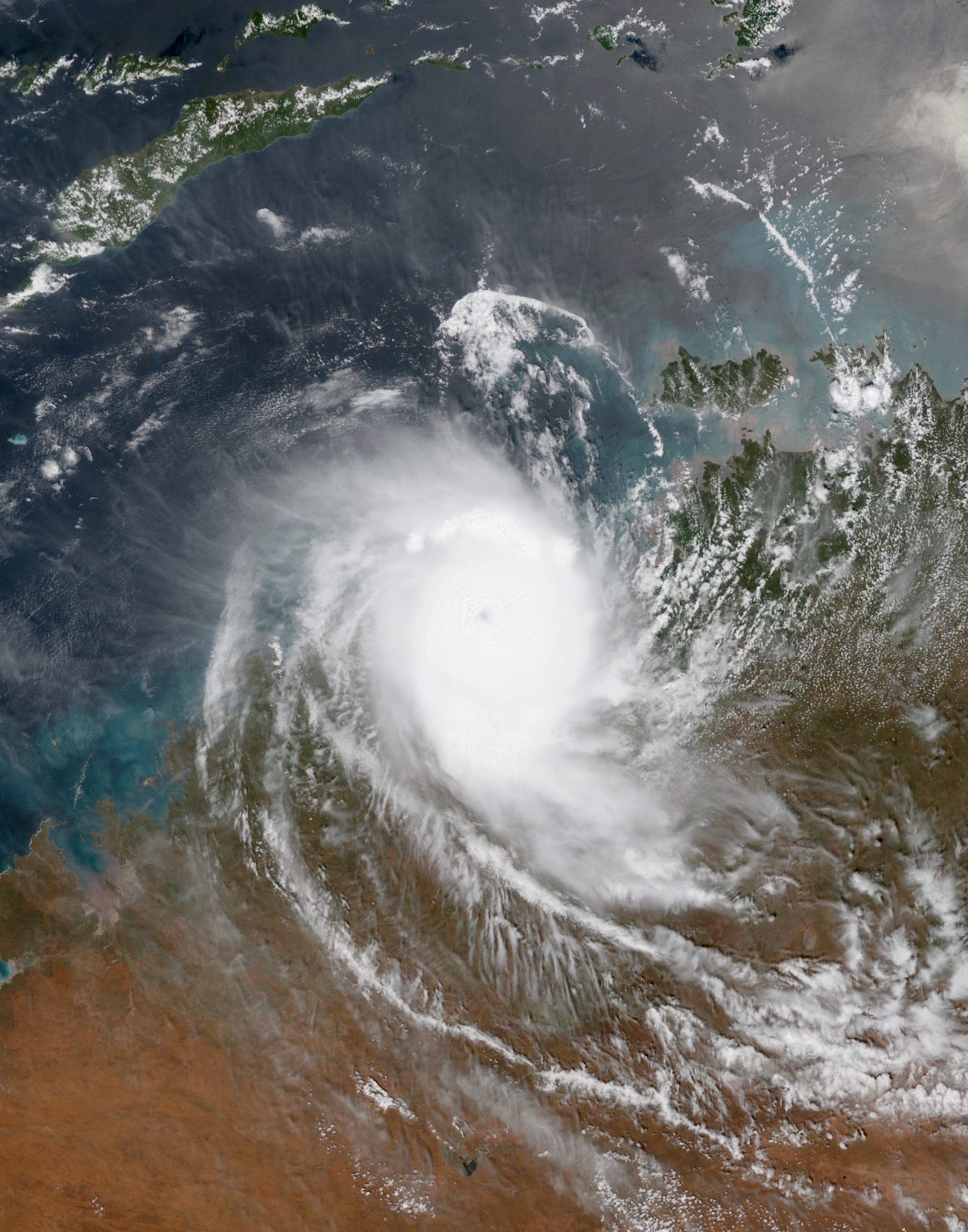
- Fina shortly after peak intensity while approaching Kimberley on 24 November

Meteorological history
- Formed: 15 November 2025
- Remnant low: 25 November 2025
- Dissipated: 26 November 2025

Category 4 severe tropical cyclone
- 10-minute sustained (BOM)
- Highest winds: 195 km/h (120 mph)
- Highest gusts: 280 km/h (175 mph)
- Lowest pressure: 938 hPa (mbar); 27.70 inHg

Category 4-equivalent tropical cyclone
- 1-minute sustained (SSHWS/JTWC)
- Highest winds: 215 km/h (130 mph)
- Lowest pressure: 946 hPa (mbar); 27.94 inHg

Overall effects
- Fatalities: None
- Damage: $60.3 million (2025 USD)
- Areas affected: Timor-Leste, Indonesia (Lesser Sunda Islands), Northern Territory (particularly Tiwi Islands, Darwin), Western Australia
- Part of the 2025–26 Australian region cyclone season

Severe Tropical Cyclone Fina was a strong, early-season tropical cyclone that affected portions of the western Top End region of Northern Territory and the northeastern Kimberley coastline of Western Australia in late 2025 November. The first named storm of the 2025–26 Australian region cyclone season, Fina was the earliest landfalling tropical cyclone in the Australian region since Cyclone Ines.

Fina originated from a tropical low, designated as Tropical Low 02U by the Bureau of Meteorology (BoM), that formed north of Kimberley on 15 November. The low began to move east and intensified into a category 1 tropical cyclone on the Australian scale was assigned the name Fina on 18 November. Fina began a strengthening trend and attained category 2 intensity early on 20 November while turning to the south. Early on 21 November, Fina made landfall on the Cobourg Peninsula before entering the Van Diemen Gulf and turning to the west-southwest. On 22 November, Fina attained category 3 intensity and subsequently made landfall on the southern tip of Melville Island. Fina began to track southwest and attained category 4 intensity early on 24 November. Later that day, Fina weakened slightly and subsequently made landfall along the northeastern Kimberley coast at category 3 intensity. Once inland, Fina began a rapid weakening trend, falling below tropical cyclone intensity on 25 November and dissipating the next day.

In anticipation of Fina, tropical cyclone warnings and watches were issued for portions of Northern Territory and Western Australia. Strong winds caused downed trees and power lines, causing 19,500 customers to lose power along communities in the Van Diemen Gulf. The community of Wurrumiyanga on the Tiwi Islands was the worst affected by Fina. Losses from Fina totaled to AU$84 million (US$60.3 million).

== Meteorological history ==
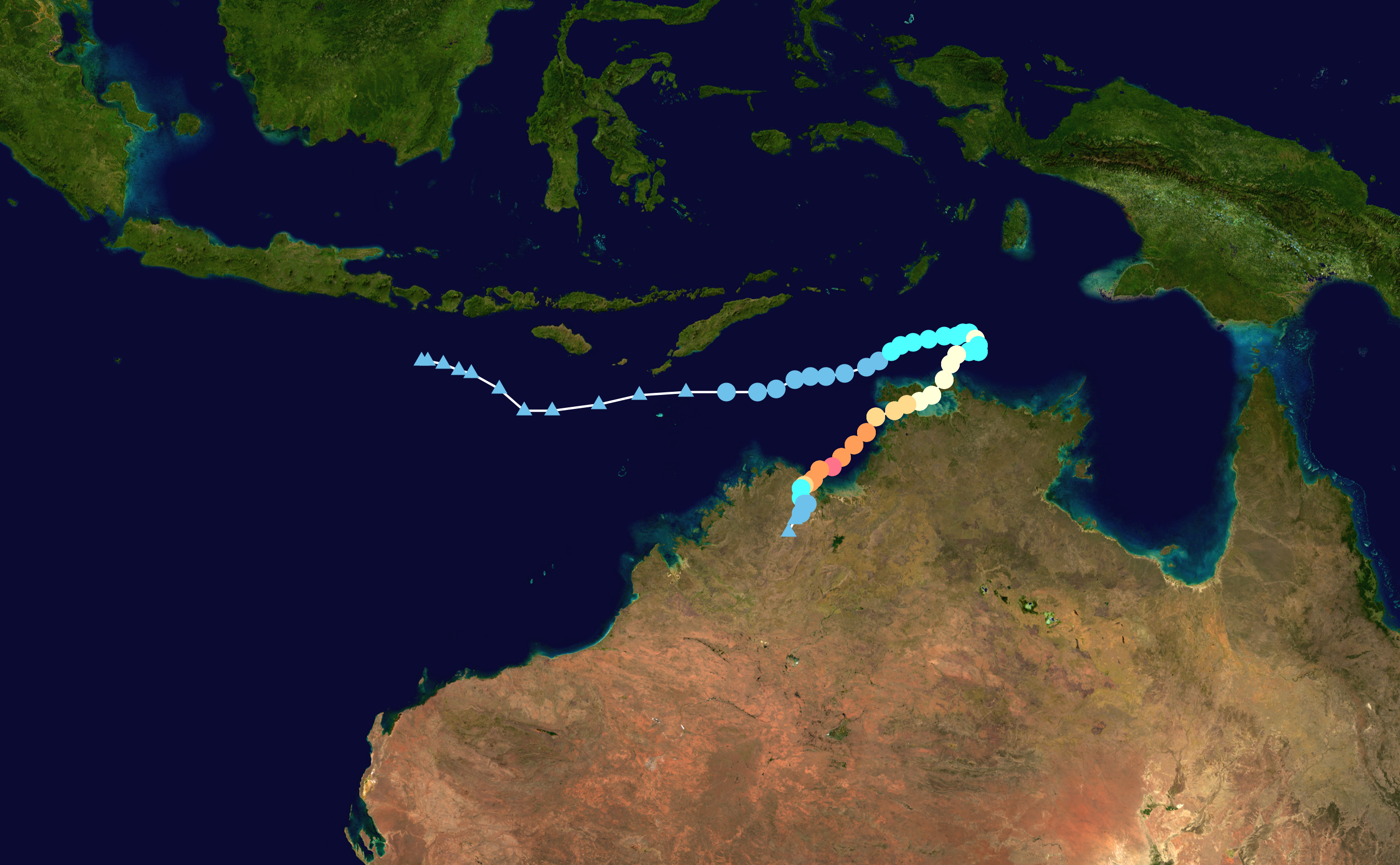
Map plotting the storm's track and intensity, according to the Saffir–Simpson scale Map key Saffir–Simpson scale Tropical depression (≤38 mph, ≤62 km/h) Tropical storm (39–73 mph, 63–118 km/h) Category 1 (74–95 mph, 119–153 km/h) Category 2 (96–110 mph, 154–177 km/h) Category 3 (111–129 mph, 178–208 km/h) Category 4 (130–156 mph, 209–251 km/h) Category 5 (≥157 mph, ≥252 km/h) Unknown Storm type Tropical cyclone Subtropical cyclone Extratropical cyclone, remnant low, tropical disturbance, or monsoon depression

The origins of Fina can be traced back to a tropical low that formed north of the Kimberley coastline. On 15 November, the Bureau of Meteorology (BoM) designated the system as Tropical Low 02U. The low began moving eastward along the near-equatorial ridge and began to organize as a result of moving into a more favorable environment for tropical cyclone intensification. On 18 November at 06:00 UTC, the BoM upgraded the tropical low to a category 1 tropical cyclone on the Australian scale and assigned the name Fina, while the low was located 260 kilometres (160 mi) north of Darwin. Warm sea surface temperatures (SSTs) between 30.5 °C (86.9 °F) and 31 °C (88 °F) allowed Fina to quickly organize, with the Joint Typhoon Warning Center (JTWC) noting that convective banding beginning to wrap around the center of circulation within the system. On 20 November at 00:00 UTC, the BoM upgraded Fina to category 2 intensity as a result. Fina subsequently turned south before encountering northeasterly wind shear and an intrusion of dry air. On 21 November at 00:00 UTC, the BoM downgraded Fina to category 1 intensity as a result. However, Fina began to re-strengthen and the BoM upgraded Fina to category 2 tropical cyclone at 12:00 UTC the same day. Fina then made landfall on the Cobourg Peninsula, becoming the earliest cyclone to make landfall on the Australian mainland since Cyclone Ines in 1973.

As Fina entered the Van Diemen Gulf, cloud tops within the cyclone began to cool, convection within the northeast quadrant continued to increase and an eye-like feature was beginning to appear on microwave imagery. On 22 November at 00:00 UTC, Fina attained category 3 intensity while moving west-southwest. However, intensification was briefly halted due to dry air intrusion within the northwestern quadrant of the storm. On 23 November, Fina was able to re-intensify as a result of warm sea surface temperatures and low wind shear. Early on 24 November, favorable conditions for tropical cyclone intensification allowed Fina to reach category 4 intensity, with ten-minute maximum sustained winds of 195 kilometres per hour (121 mph), making Fina the strongest tropical cyclone in the Australian region in November. However, as Fina approached the land-interaction and increased intrusions of dry air caused Fina to rapidly weaken. Later that same day, Fina weakened to category 3 intensity and made landfall near the mouth of the Berkeley River along the northeastern Kimberley coast. Once inland, Fina rapidly weakened to a tropical low on 25 November and dissipated early the next day.

== Preparations, impact, and aftermath ==
=== Preparations ===
In anticipation of Fina, cyclone warnings were issued for portions of Northern Territory and Western Australia. Operations at the Darwin Airport and ferry services to Mandorah were temporarily suspended. Many residents purchased bottled water and canned foods, with one grocery store owner noting a 30% increase in customers. Royal Darwin Hospital issued a code brown to streamline emergency management systems. Classes at the Charles Darwin University were suspended. Community centers, parks and sporting ovals were closed in anticipation of Fina. A fuel tanker was sent to Darwin to the increase diesel supply of the city ahead of Fina. Around 6,000 cattle were evacuated off of floodplains. More than 300 residents on the Tiwi Islands evacuated to shelters prior to Fina. Seventy students from Tiwi College were sent home in anticipation of Fina. Police officers were sent to the Tiwi Islands to help communities prepare.

=== Impact ===
The primary effect of Fina was strong winds that caused significant roof and tree damage. Darwin was buffeted with wind gusts up to 120 kilometres per hour (75 mph). The strongest individual wind gusts recorded were 109 kilometres per hour (68 mph) at Crocker Island Airport and 107 kilometres per hour (66 mph) at Darwin Airport. Around 100–300 millimetres (3.9–11.8 in) of rain collectively fell through Darwin. The highest rainfall total from Fina was at Middle Point, which received 430 millimetres (17 in) of rain in a 24-hour period, the highest daily rainfall on record for Northern Territory in November.

Strong winds downed hundreds of trees across Darwin, damaging cars, homes, and destroying cubby houses while heavy rainfall caused flash flooding along roadways. Additionally, several boats ran aground. Widespread power outages were reported across Darwin, Palmerston, and the Tiwi Islands, with PowerWater reporting that around 19,500 customers lost power. SA Power Networks reported that strong winds downed 50 power lines and a dozen power poles. State Emergency Services received 170 emergency calls for assistance involving fallen trees and damaged roofs. Optus reported that fifteen cell sites were knocked offline by Fina. Three schools were affected by power and water outages from Fina. Strong winds caused a portion of the external wall and a small section of the ceiling of the Royal Darwin Hospital to collapse. The primary supplier of bananas for Top End suffered a 40% crop loss from Fina. One family was forced to evacuate their apartment complex after strong winds blew off a portion of the roof.

The community of Wurrumiyanga on Bathurst Island was the worst affected by Fina. Strong winds downed 30-40 trees, causing widespread power outages and major damage to homes. Buildings at Tiwi college had their roofs blown off by strong winds. The primary water tank of the school was damaged by a fallen tree, causing staff members to lose access to potable water. Twenty of the staff members were evacuated to Darwin as a result. Damage to the school was estimated at AU$600,000-700,000 (US$424,000-494,000).

Along the northeastern Kimberley coast of Western Australia, structures and vegetation at the Berkeley River Lodge suffered extensive wind damage from Fina. Two villas were damaged and an additional three villas were destroyed.

=== Aftermath and Retirement ===
Following the cyclone, 72 repair crews were mobilized to restore electrical service to residents in Darwin. Officials in Darwin estimated that over 4,500 trees were in need of repairs. Contractors and officials worked to remove approximately 170,000 tonnes (190,000 short tons) of green-waste brought by the cyclone. Around 60,000 tonnes (66,000 short tons) of mulch were offered to residents to restore vegetation damaged by the cyclone. More than AU$500,000 (US$353,000) were raised to repair the damage to Tiwi College. The Northern Territory Emergency Management distributed loans and freight grants to seven local governments for farmers in need of assistance. The Government of Northern Territory announced hardship payments worth AU$250 were to be distributed to residents affected by the cyclone. More than 80 wild animals were brought to Wild North Veterinary hospital following the cyclone. Fina also caused the primary gas supply of Northern Territory to shut down. Many local parks in Darwin were closed for months due to severe vegetation damage caused by Fina.

After the season, it was announced that the name Fina would be retired from the rotating list of names of the Australia basin. It was replaced with Freya.

== See also ==
- Other storms with the same name
- Weather of 2025
- Tropical cyclones in 2025
- Cyclone Marcus (2018) - the previous cyclone to directly impact Darwin
