= CBAT =

CBAT may refer to:

- CBAT-DT, a television station licensed to Fredericton, New Brunswick, Canada
- Central Bureau for Astronomical Telegrams
- Confederação Brasileira de Atletismo
- Column-based analytical technology
- Can't Buy a Thrill, Steely Dan's 1972 debut album
- "Cbat", a song from Hudson Mohawke's 2011 EP Satin Panthers
- Community Based Acute Treatment
