= Finna =

Finna may refer to:

- Finna, a conjugation of "fixing to", common in African-American Vernacular English and Southern American English: See African-American Vernacular English § Tense and aspect
- Finna (novella), a 2020 speculative fiction novella by Nino Cipri
- Finna (online database), an online public access catalog held by the National Library of Finland

== See also ==
- Gonna
