= International Numismatic Congress =

The International Numismatic Congress (INC) is the largest international conference for numismatists. It is organised every six years by the International Numismatic Council. Since the 7th INC in Copenhagen, the conference has also marked the launch of the Survey of Numismatic Literature, in which specialist numismatists review research and publications since the previous Congress. A special medal is created for each Congress. The Congress has, from the 6th INC in Rome forward, met at six-year intervals with the only slight disturbances being that the 10th INC in London convened seven years after the previous Congress and saw a slightly shortened span of five years following the London INC; and the 16th INC in Warsaw similarly convened seven years after the previous Congress due to the COVID-19 pandemic, with a projected span of five years to the proceeding Frankfurt INC.

== Congresses ==
- The 17th INC (2027) will take place in Frankfurt, 12-17 Sept 2027.
- The 16th INC (2022) - Warsaw, 11-16 September 2022.
- The 15th INC (2015) - Taormina, Sicily, 21–25 September 2015.
- The 14th INC (2009) - Glasgow, 31 August - 4 September 2009.
- The 13th INC (2003) - Madrid, 15–19 September 2003.
- The 12th INC (1997) - Berlin, September 1997.
- The 11th INC (1991) - Brussels, 8–12 September 1991.
- The 10th INC (1986) - London, 8–12 September 1986.
- The 9th INC (1979) - Berne, 10–15 September 1979.
- The 8th INC (1973) - New York and Washington, 10–16 September 1973.
- The 7th INC (1967) - Copenhagen, 28 August - 2 September 1967.
- The 6th INC (1961) - Rome, 11–16 September 1961.
- The 5th INC (1953) - Paris, 6–11 July 1953.
- The 4th INC (1936) - London, 30 June - 3 July 1936. - there was a special exhibition of medals at the British Museum at the time of the congress
- The 3rd INC (1910) - Brussels, 25–29 June 1910.
- The 2nd INC (1900) - Paris, 14–16 June 1900.
- The 1st INC (1891) - Brussels, 5–8 July 1891.

== Survey of Numismatic Research ==
The Surveys are compiled by subject specialists, which are then edited by a senior numismatist (or team of numismatists), and published in the "International Association of Professional Numismatists Special Publication" series, usually in the location of the relevant congress. Digital versions of the Surveys are available on the INC website.

- A Survey of Numismatic Research, 2014-2020 (Warsaw, 2022).
- A Survey of Numismatic Research, 2008-2013 (Rome, 2015).OCLC 929450335
- A Survey of Numismatic Research, 2002-2007 (Glasgow, 2009).OCLC 648021649
- A Survey of Numismatic Research, 1996-2003 (Madrid, 2003).OCLC 53854696
- A Survey of Numismatic Research, 1990-1995 (Berlin, 1997).OCLC 40864453
- A Survey of Numismatic Research, 1985-1990 (Brussels, 1991).OCLC 26530828
- A Survey of Numismatic Research, 1978-1984 (London, 1986).OCLC 220794533
- A Survey of Numismatic Research, 1972-1977 (Berne, 1979).OCLC 6273918
- A Survey of Numismatic Research, 1966-1971 (New York, 1973).OCLC 770700
- A Survey of Numismatic Research, 1960-1965 (Copenhagen, 1965).OCLC 37185

== Congress medals ==
- The 1986 INC London Medal also commemorated the 150th anniversary of the Royal Numismatic Society.
- The 2015 INC Taormina Medal 2015
- The 1910 INC Brussels Ernest Babelon Medal (obverse by Devreese, reverse by Rudolf Bosselt).
- The 1900 INC Paris Medal - by it:Daniel Dupuis
