= François de Callataÿ =

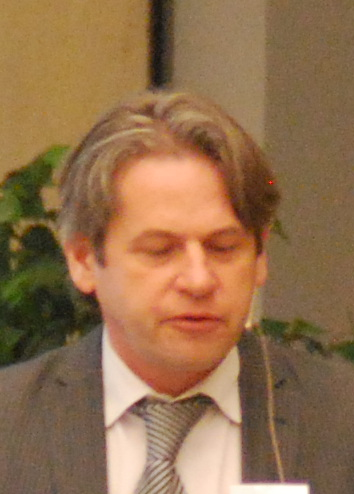
François de Callataÿ at a numismatics conference in 2011

François de Callataÿ (born 1961) is a Belgian ancient historian, professor at the École pratique des hautes études (Paris/Sorbonne), who has written significant studies of coinage and finance in the ancient Mediterranean world.

== Life and career ==
Callataÿ was born in Uccle, Belgium, on 13 June 1961. He was educated at the Collège Saint-Pierre (Uccle), and then studied Archaeology and Art History at the Université catholique de Louvain. He went on to specialise in the study of ancient Greek money, presenting a doctoral dissertation in 1988. In 1991 he was appointed to the medals collection of the Royal Library of Belgium, becoming director of the collection in 1994. In 2006 he was appointed over-all head of the patrimonial collection of the Royal Library (including manuscripts rare books, prints, maps, coins, medals and music).

In 1995 and 2003 he was visiting professor of the Summer Seminar of the American Numismatic Society. Since 1998 he has lectured once a week at the École pratique des hautes études (Paris/Sorbonne). He is a member of the Royal Academies for Science and the Arts of Belgium.

== Awards ==
- Bordin Prize of the French Académie des Inscriptions & Belles-Lettres (1998)

== Works ==
- L'Histoire des Guerres Mithridatiques vue par les monnaies (Louvain-la-Neuve, 1997) on the Mithridatic Wars of the 1st century BC.
- with G. Le Rider, Les Séleucides et les Ptolémées: L’héritage monétaire et financier d’Alexandre le Grand (Paris, 2006)
- Cléopâtre, usages et mésusages de son image (Brussels, 2015) on Cleopatra

== See also ==
- Fontes_Inediti_Numismaticae_Antiquae
- SILVER Wiki
