= Maria Caccamo Caltabiano =

Italian numismatist (1946-)

- Born: 9 September 1946 (age 80)

Academic background
- Education: University of Messina

Academic work
- Discipline: Numismatics
- Institutions: University of Messina

Maria Caccamo Caltabiano is an Italian numismatist who is known for her work on the iconography of Ancient Greek and Roman coinage.

== Career ==
Caccamo Caltabiano studied and taught at the University of Messina. Since 1994, she has held the position of Professor of Numismatics. From 1998 until 2004, she was Director of the Department of Classical Studies.

Since 2000, Caccamo Caltabiano has worked on the project Lexicon Iconographicum Numismaticae Classicae et Mediae Aetatis (LIN), which has been supported by the International Numismatic Council since 2005. From 1996 until 1998 she led the DRACMA (Diffusion and Research on Ancient Coinage of the Mediterranean Area) project, in collaboration with the Numismatic Museum of Athens, the Archaeological Museum of Cyprus, and the Archaeological Museum of Agrigento, funded by the European Commission's Raphael program.

Caccamo Caltabiano was the vice president of the International Numismatic Council from 2015 until 2022, having already been a committee member from 2009. She was chair of the scientific and organising committee for the XVth International Numismatic Congress held in Taormina in 2015. She is an honorary member of the Accademia Italiana di Studi Numismatici.

== Awards ==
Caccamo Caltabiano won the International Association of Professional Numismatists Book Prize in 1994 for 'La Monetazione di Messana'.

== Publications ==
- (1977). Una città del Sud tra Roma e Annibale. La monetazione di Petelia. Sophia, Palermo.
- (1992). Dalla premoneta alla moneta. Lessico monetale greco tra semantica e ideologia (with P. Radici Colace). ETS, Pisa. ISBN 978-8877416667
- (1993). La monetazione di Messana, con le emissioni di Rhegion dell’età della tirannide. De Gruyter, Berlín-Nova York. ISBN 978-3110135275
- (1997). Siracusa ellenistica. Le monete «Regali» di Ierone II, della sua famiglia e dei siracusani (with B. Carroccio e E. Oteri E.). Università degli Studi di Messina. ISBN 978-8882680008
- (2007). Il significato delle immagini. Codice di comunicazione e immaginario della moneta antica. Falzea Editore, Reggio Calabria. ISBN 9788882962487
- (2015). Survey of numismatic research: 2008-2013 (with C. Arnold-Biucchi). International Association of Professional Numismatists / International Numismatic Council. ISBN 9788897805427
- (2015). XV International Numismatic Congress. Taormina 2015. Proceedings. Arbor Sapientiae, Roma. ISBN 978-88-94820-31-7
