= Fina (architecture) =

Narrow public space immediately alongside buildings

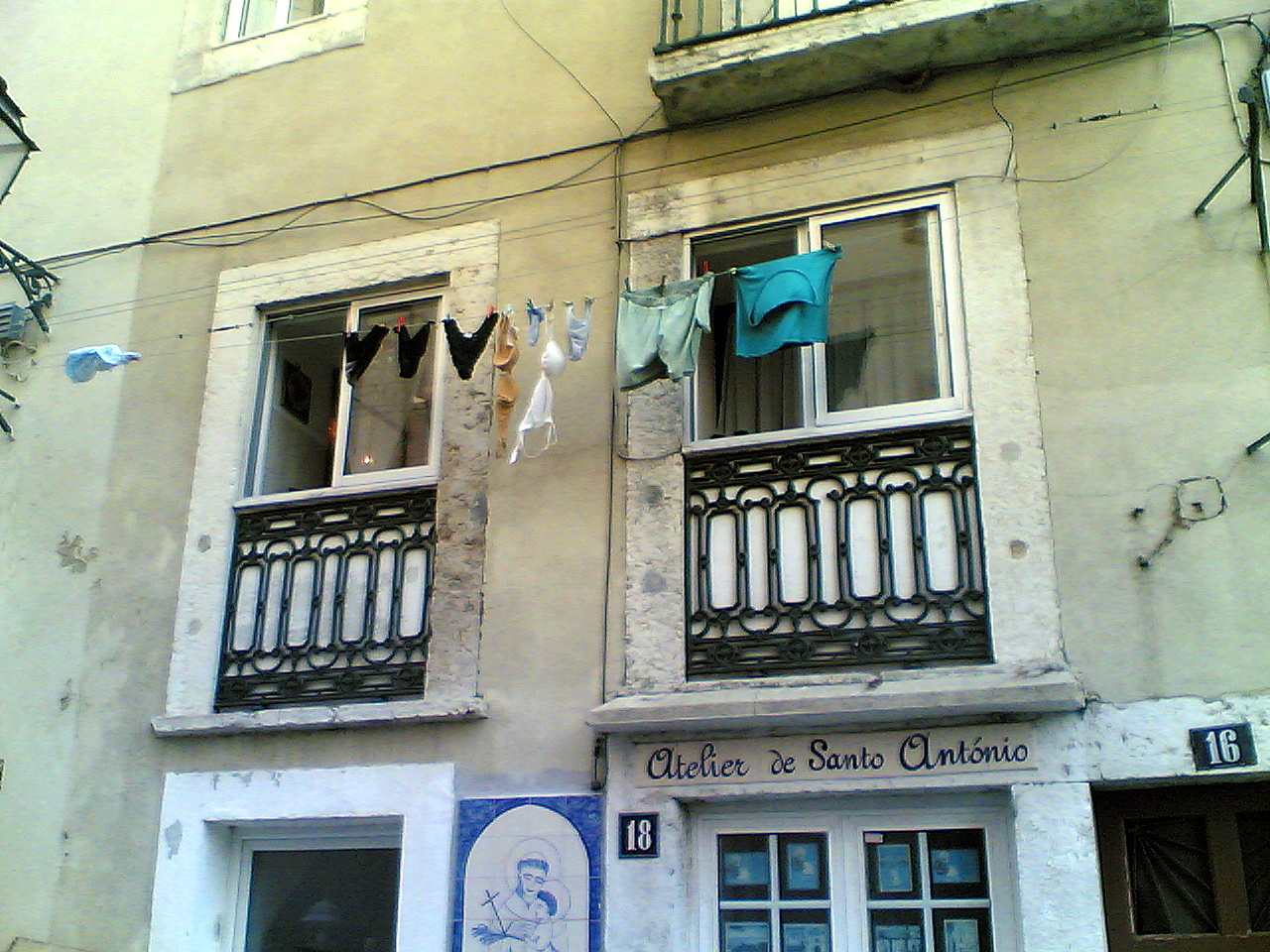
An example of a fina

In Mediterranean architecture, the fina is a physical space used in urban design. It is used for the courtyard in the buildings and the spaces in front of the buildings. Al-fina along the street is corresponding to the approximately 1-meter-wide public space alongside buildings. It was considered as a private area of the building. It is used for the placement of design items within traditional architectural elements. It also mandates public rules of behaviour for the neighbours concerning the usage and maintenance of finas in their buildings. For instance, inhabitants have the right to use the part of the fina immediately in front of their home, but they have no right to block it.

Fina is identified as a convention in ancient Levant architecture that denotes a zone along the street wall of a building where balconies, downspouts, and other protruding features were allowed as long as they did not impede the passage of public transport and other users of the street. In Islamic architecture, fina or Al-Fina, which emerged in old Islamic cities that were organized by Islamic law, refers to a patio – an open-sky courtyard of a central building. It serves to illuminate and ventilate rooms and spaces inside buildings. This particular architectural concept is still used in urban spaces in the Middle East such as Egypt as a form of environmental organizer. This in-between space also influences the urban fabric and character of the city.

Fina has two types of uses: temporary and permanent. Trees, flower pots, window gratings and other decorations constitute the temporary uses of fina. Its permanent use are represented courtyard in the building where all rooms surrounded it including built-in structures such as stairs, benches, and water-related infrastructure, among others. These also include the sabat, which is a structure built between the opposite buildings on both sides of a narrow street. It is constituted by rooms bridging the street. It provides a passageway to respect the right of way, and the supporting pillars of the resulting arch must be within the fina. In the commercial areas, fina was part of the shops and used for shops' goods and as a sitting place.
