= 1973–74 Australian region cyclone season =

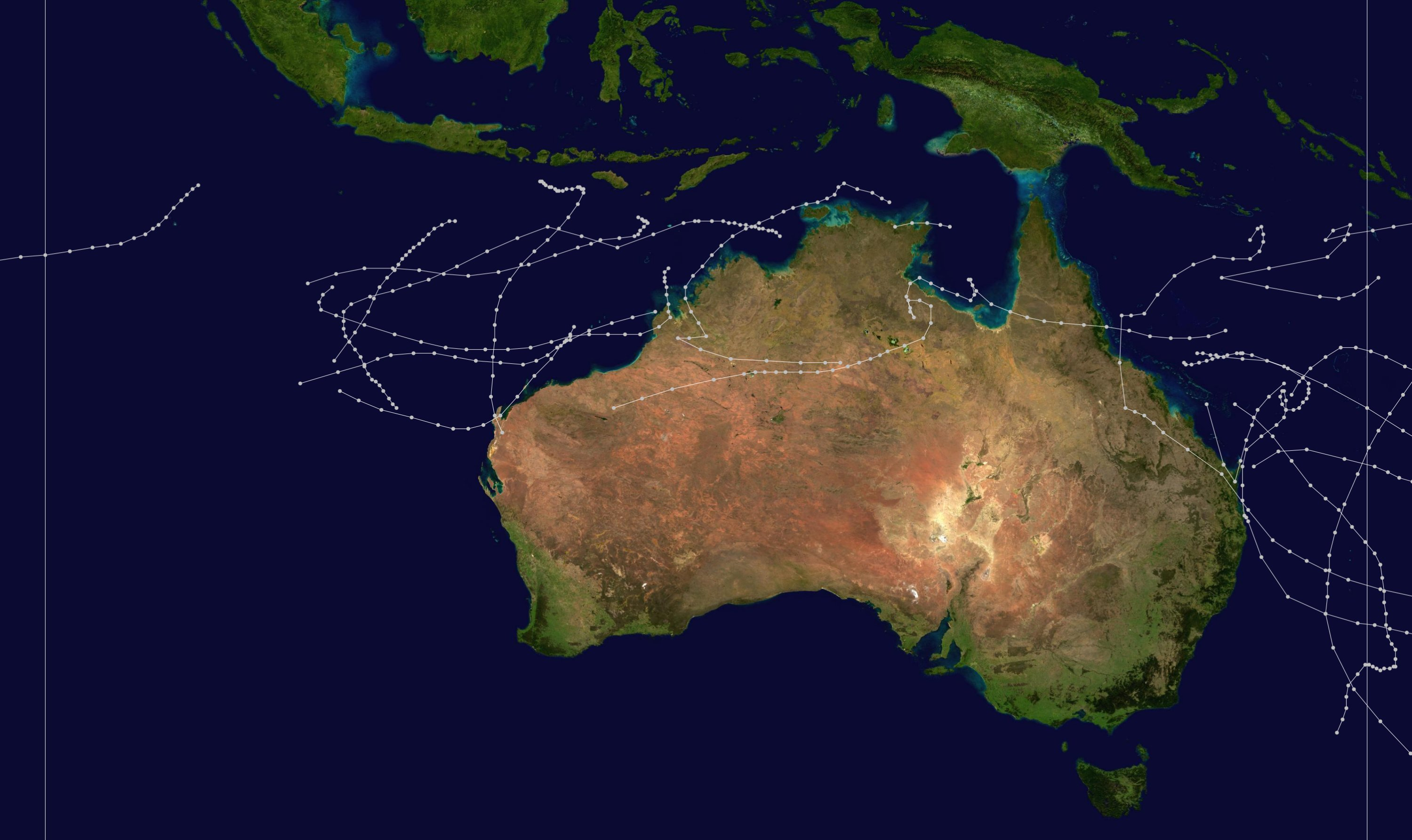
- Season summary map

Seasonal boundaries
- First system formed: 17 November 1973
- Last system dissipated: 23 March 1974

Strongest storm
- Name: Pam
  - Maximum winds: 205 km/h (125 mph) (10-minute sustained)
  - Lowest pressure: 928 hPa (mbar)

Seasonal statistics
- Tropical lows: 19
- Tropical cyclones: 19
- Severe tropical cyclones: 10
- Total fatalities: >101
- Total damage: Unknown

Related articles
- 1973–74 South Pacific cyclone season; 1973–74 South-West Indian Ocean cyclone season

The 1973–74 Australian region cyclone season was the third most active tropical cyclone season in the Australian Region.

== Systems ==
=== Severe Tropical Cyclone Ines ===
- Category 3 severe tropical cyclone (Australian scale)
- Category 1 tropical cyclone (SSHWS)
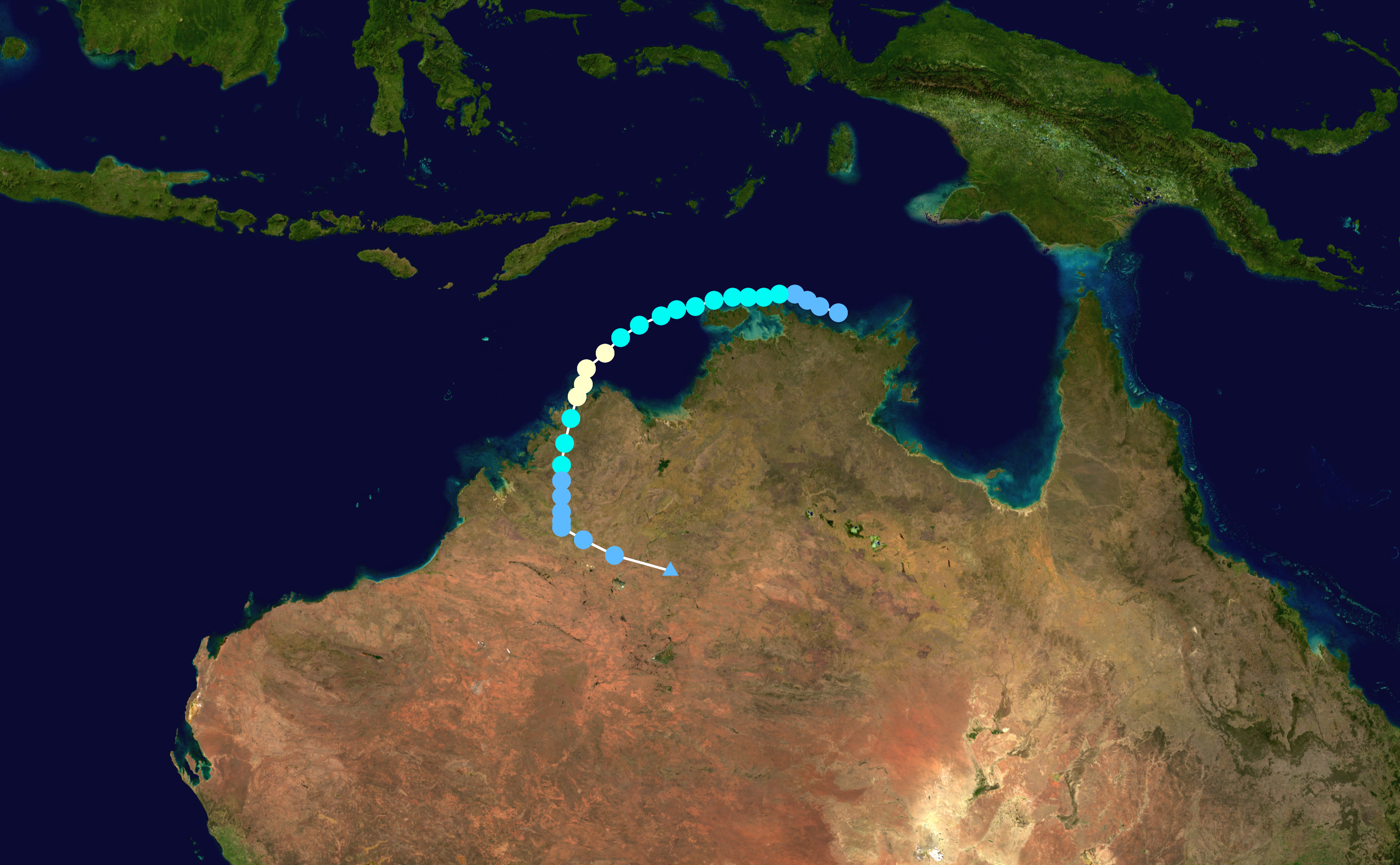
- Duration: November 17 – November 24
- Peak intensity: 150 km/h (90 mph) (10-min); 970 hPa (mbar)

On November 17, Ines formed offshore the Top End. Moving westward, the cyclone passed north of Bathurst and Melville islands. Thereafter, Ines curved southwestward and intensified into a 130 km/h (80 mph) cyclone while nearing Troughton Island. The storm made landfall in Kimberley, Western Australia on November 19. Ines slowly weakened after moving inland and dissipated on November 24.

=== Tropical Cyclone Annie ===
- Category 2 tropical cyclone (Australian scale)
- Tropical storm (SSHWS)
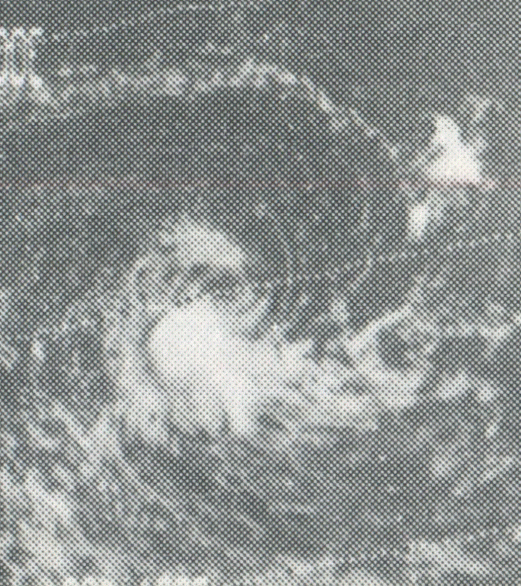
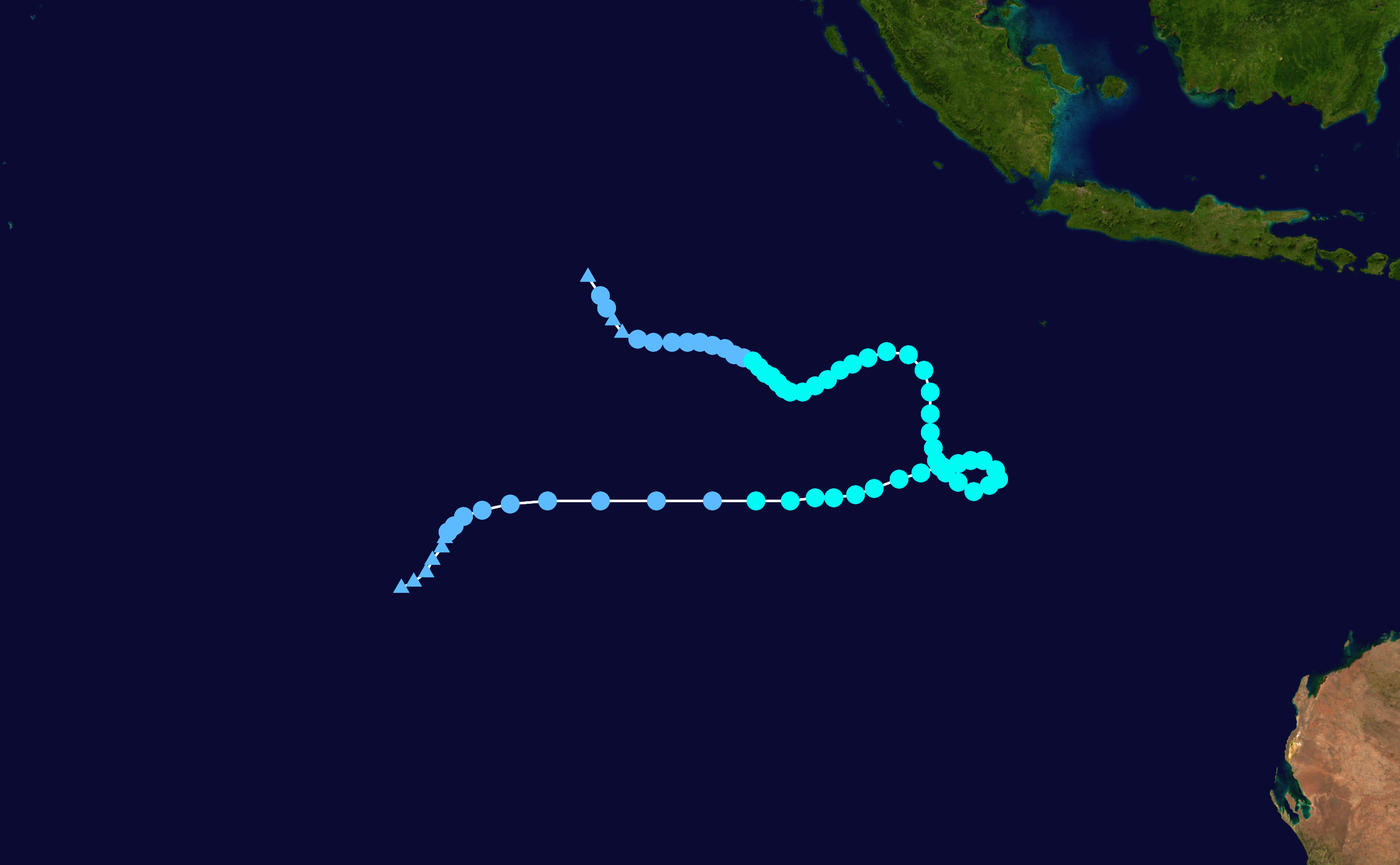
- Duration: November 21 – December 8
- Peak intensity: 100 km/h (65 mph) (10-min); 981 hPa (mbar)

Cyclone Annie developed northwest of Western Australia on November 21. By December 8, it dissipated.

=== Severe Tropical Cyclone Beryl ===
- Category 3 severe tropical cyclone (Australian scale)
- Category 1 tropical cyclone (SSHWS)
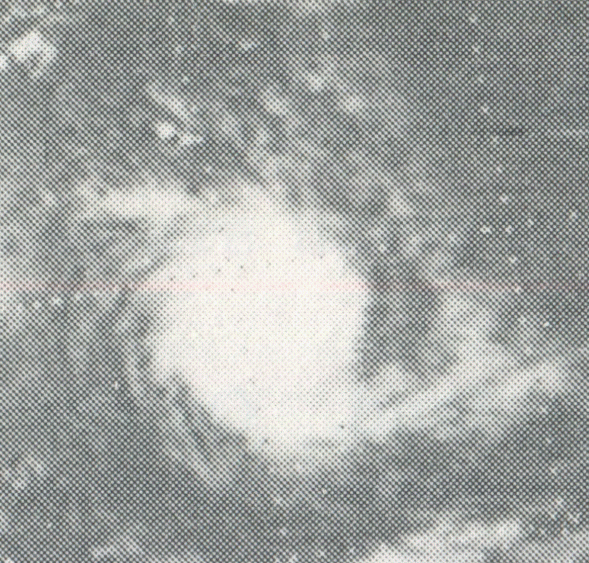
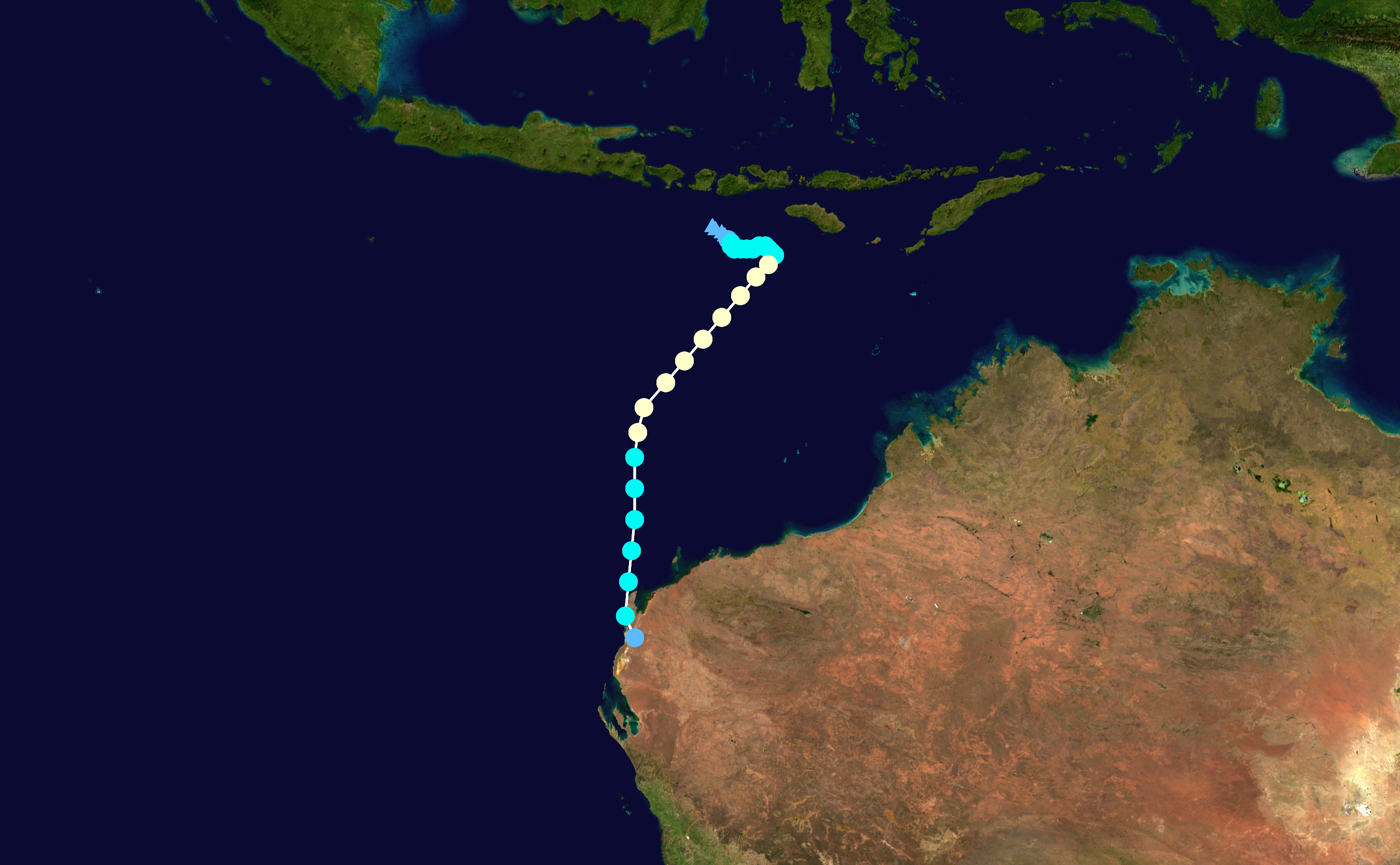
- Duration: November 26 – December 4
- Peak intensity: 130 km/h (80 mph) (10-min); 973 hPa (mbar)

Beryl formed just south of the Lesser Sunda Islands on November 26. The cyclone strengthened, peaking with winds of 125 km/h (80 mph) on December 1. Three days later, Beryl made landfall near Carnarvon, Western Australia and quickly dissipated. Minor wind damage was reported.

=== Tropical Cyclone Natalie–Lottie ===
- Category 1 tropical cyclone (Australian scale)
- Tropical storm (SSHWS)
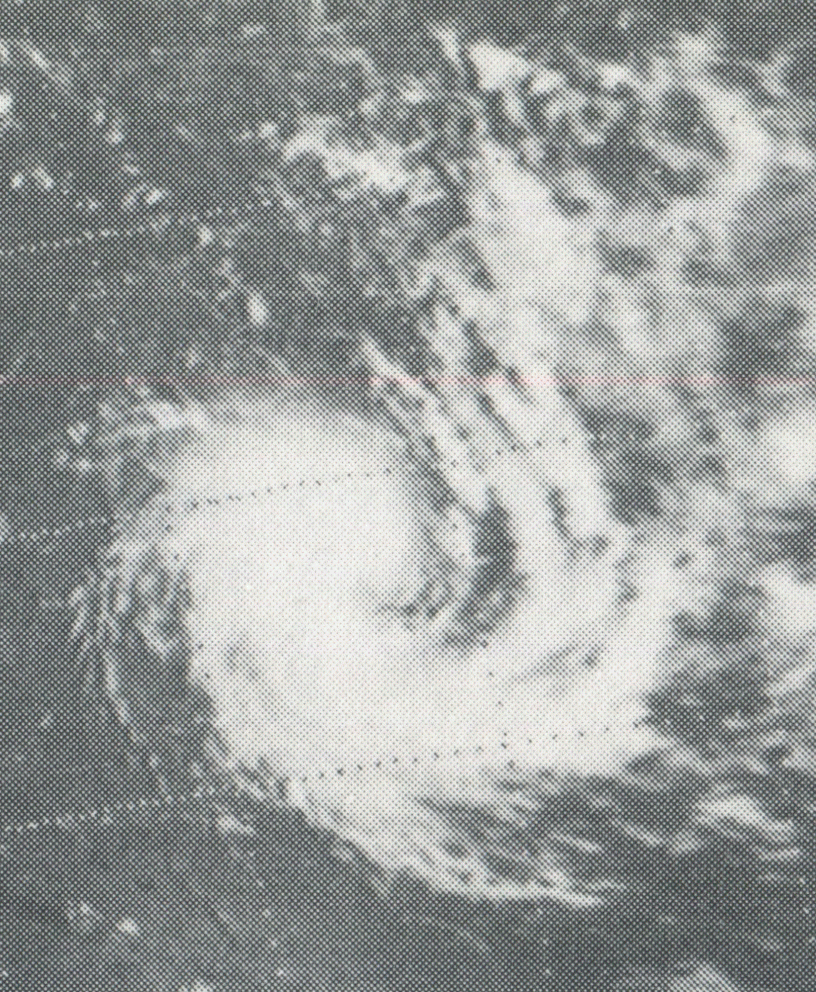
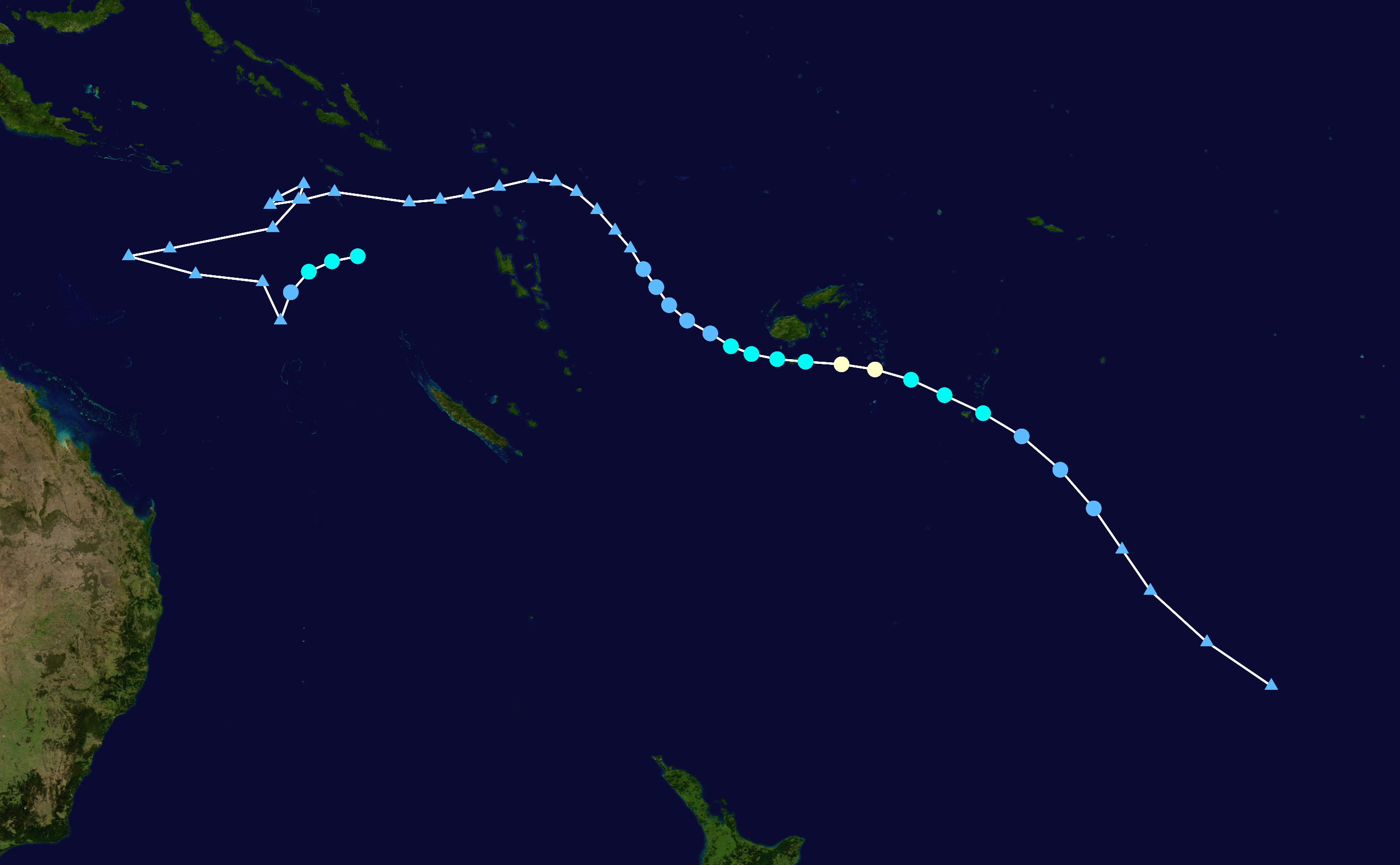
- Duration: December 1 – December 2
- Peak intensity: 65 km/h (40 mph) (10-min); 995 hPa (mbar)

Cyclone Lottie struck Fiji's Southern Lau Group on December 10. High seas caused the ship Uluilakeba to capsize killing more than 85 people.

=== Severe Tropical Cyclone Cecily ===
- Category 3 severe tropical cyclone (Australian scale)
- Category 1 tropical cyclone (SSHWS)
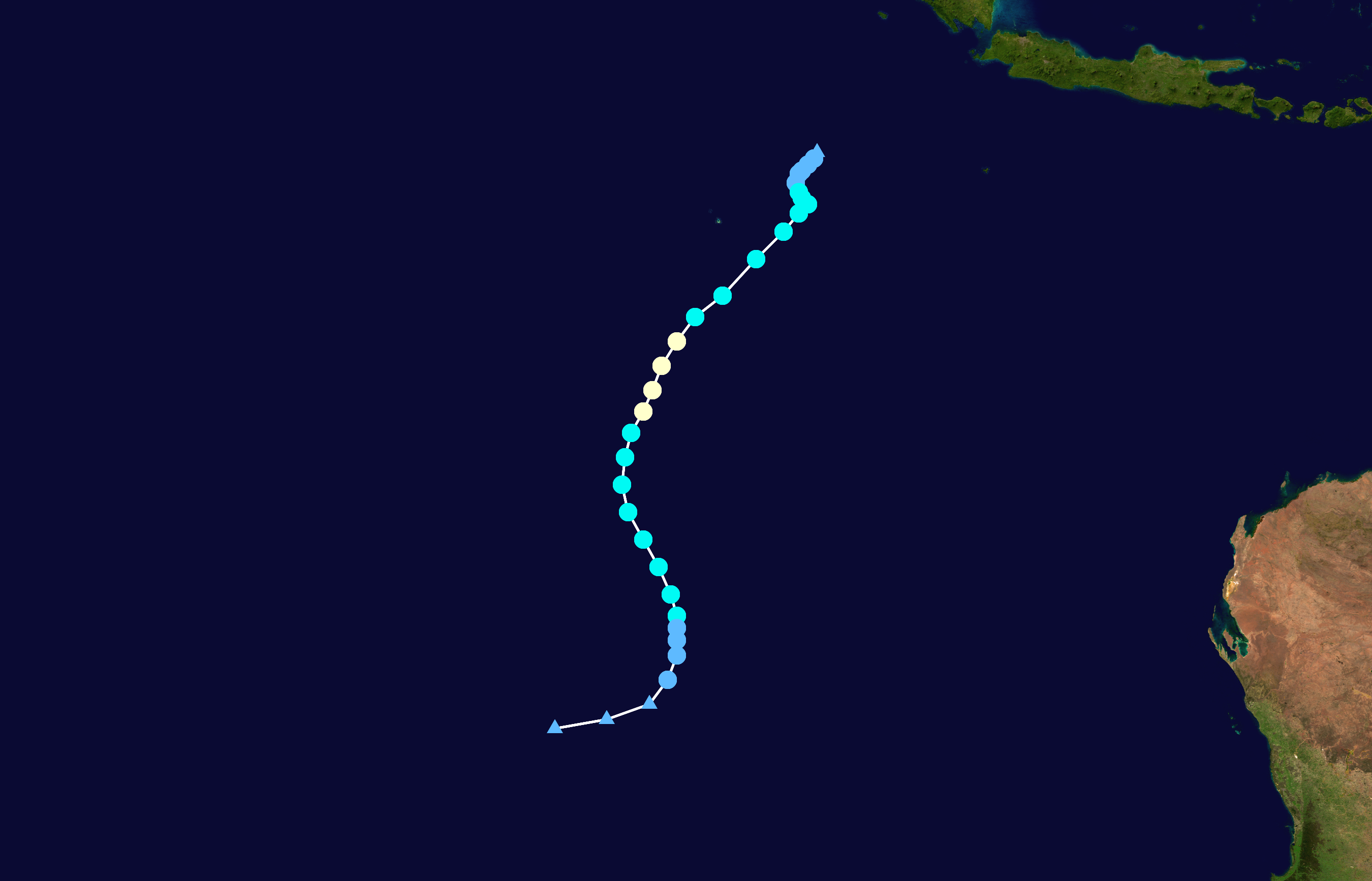
- Duration: December 11 – December 19
- Peak intensity: 130 km/h (80 mph) (10-min); 973 hPa (mbar)

The next system, Cecily, developed near the Cocos Islands on December 11. Cecily moved south-southwestward and peaked with winds of 125 km/h (80 mph). On December 19, the cyclone dissipated.

=== Tropical Cyclone Una ===
- Category 2 tropical cyclone (Australian scale)
- Tropical storm (SSHWS)
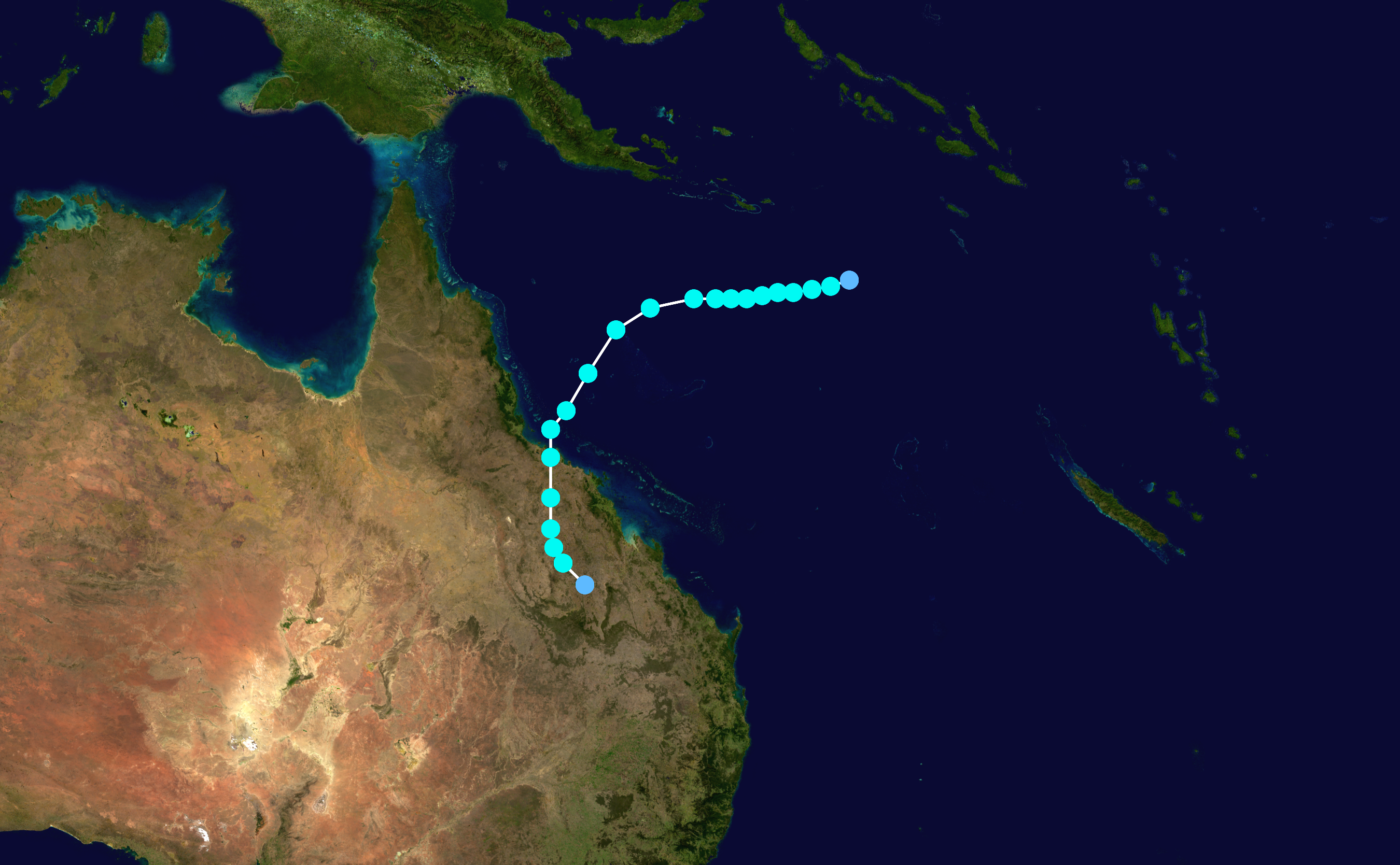
- Duration: December 15 – December 20
- Peak intensity: 100 km/h (65 mph) (10-min); 988 hPa (mbar)

Una formed southwest of Solomon Islands on December 15. It struck Queensland before dissipating on December 20.

=== Severe Tropical Cyclone Deidre–Delinda ===
- Category 3 severe tropical cyclone (Australian scale)
- Category 1 tropical cyclone (SSHWS)
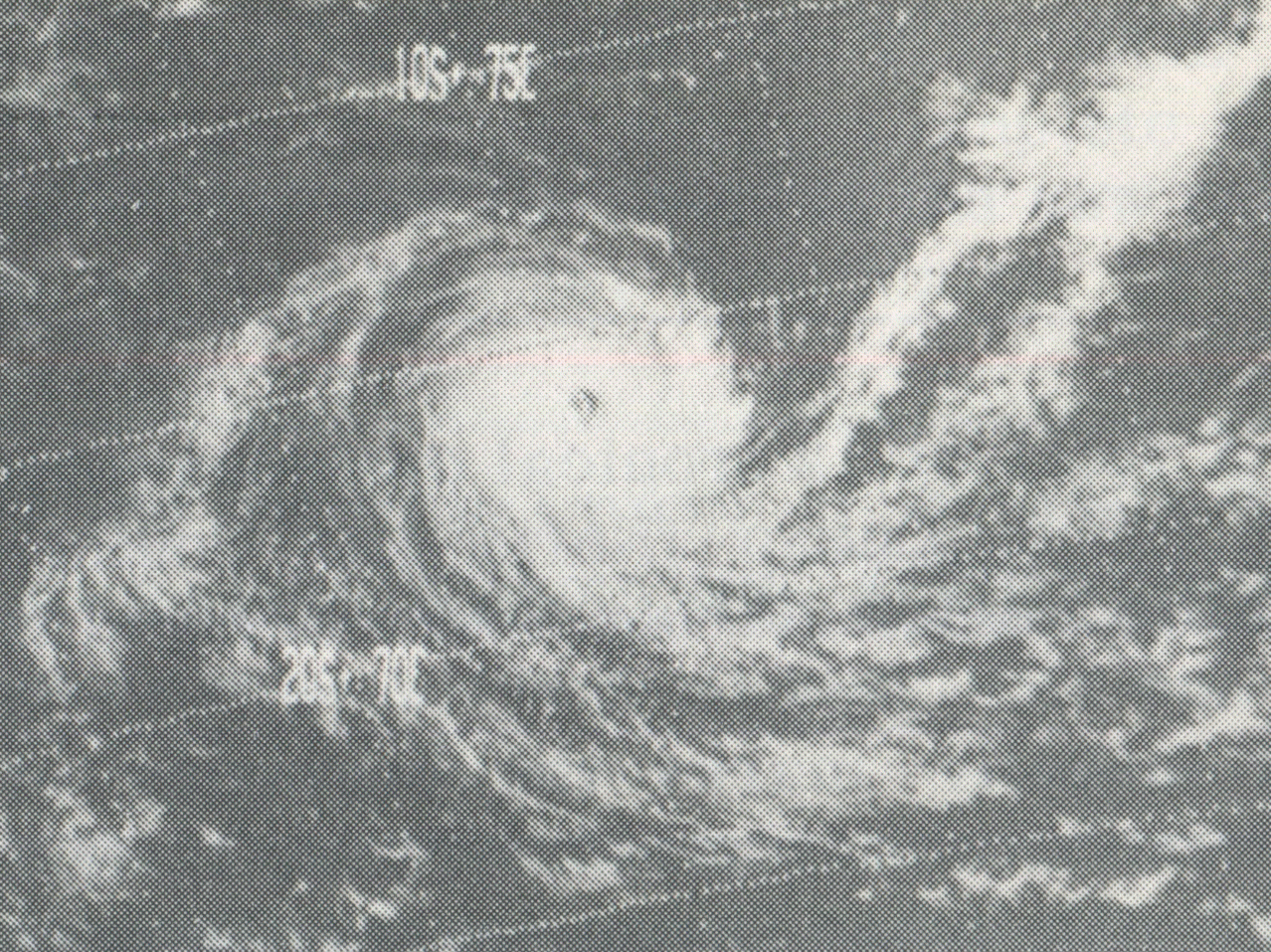
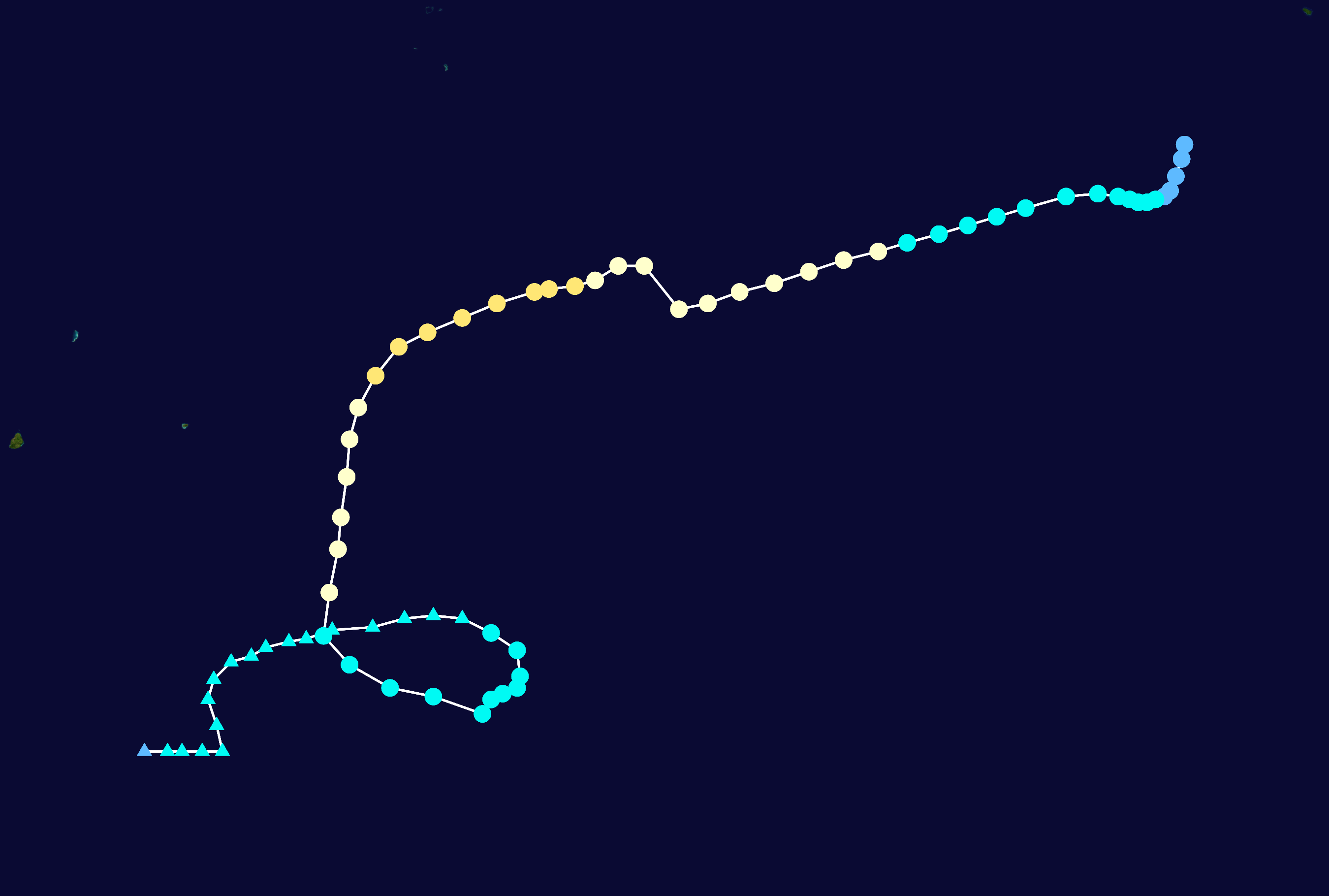
- Duration: December 20 – December 25 (Crossed 80°E)
- Peak intensity: 150 km/h (90 mph) (10-min); 964 hPa (mbar)

Cyclone Deidre developed in the vicinity of the Cocos Islands on December 20. Moving generally west-southwestward across the Indian Ocean, it crossed the 80°E on December 25.

=== Tropical Cyclone Erica ===
- Category 2 tropical cyclone (Australian scale)
- Category 1 tropical cyclone (SSHWS)
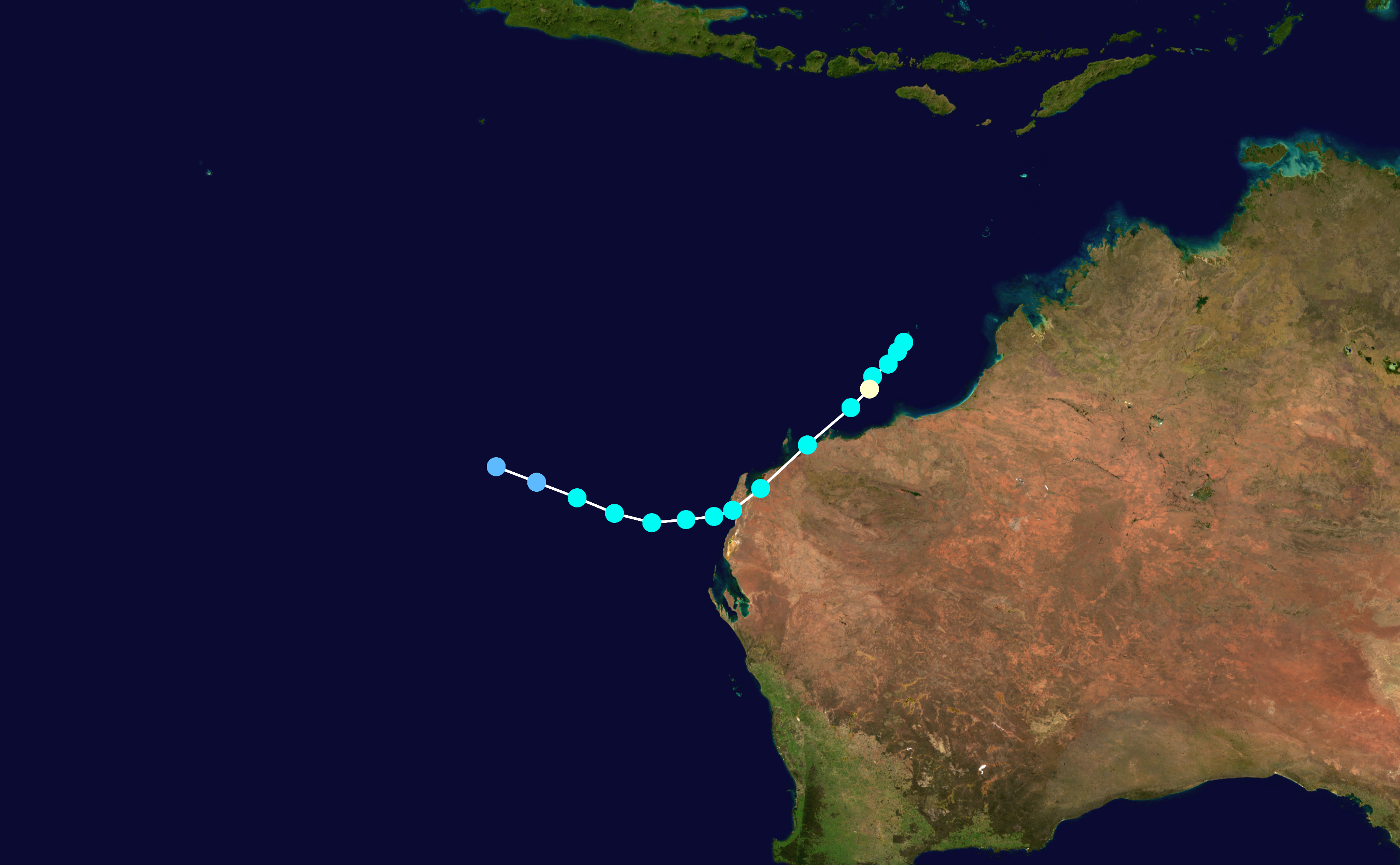
- Duration: December 29 – January 5
- Peak intensity: 95 km/h (60 mph) (10-min); 977 hPa (mbar)

Tropical Cyclone Erica brought heavy rainfall to portions of Western Australia.

=== Tropical Cyclone Fiona–Gwenda ===
- Category 2 tropical cyclone (Australian scale)
- Tropical storm (SSHWS)
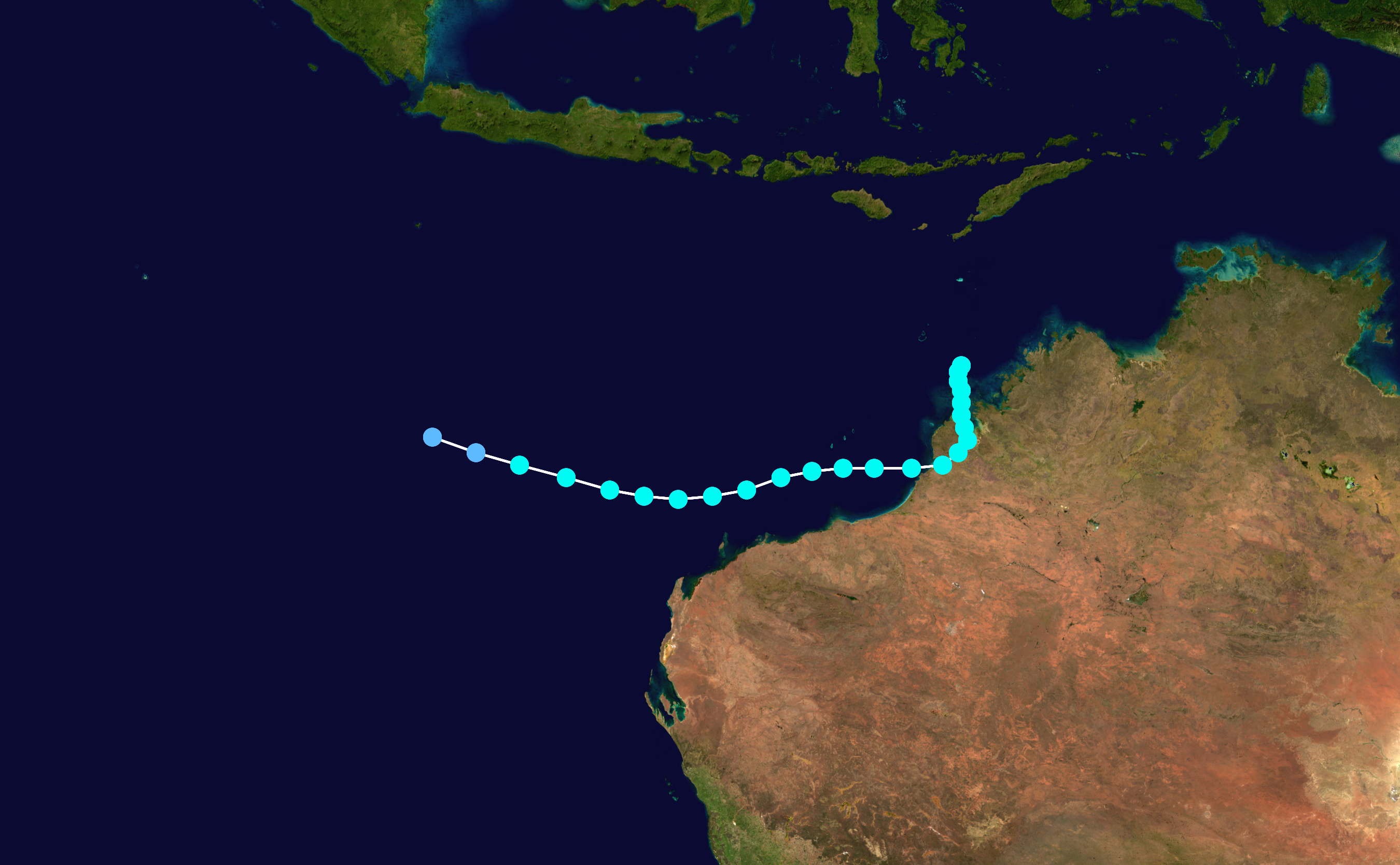
- Duration: January 6 – January 13
- Peak intensity: 100 km/h (65 mph) (10-min); 982 hPa (mbar)

Fiona-Gwenda was operationally considered two different tropical cyclones.

=== Tropical Cyclone Vera ===
- Category 2 tropical cyclone (Australian scale)
- Tropical storm (SSHWS)
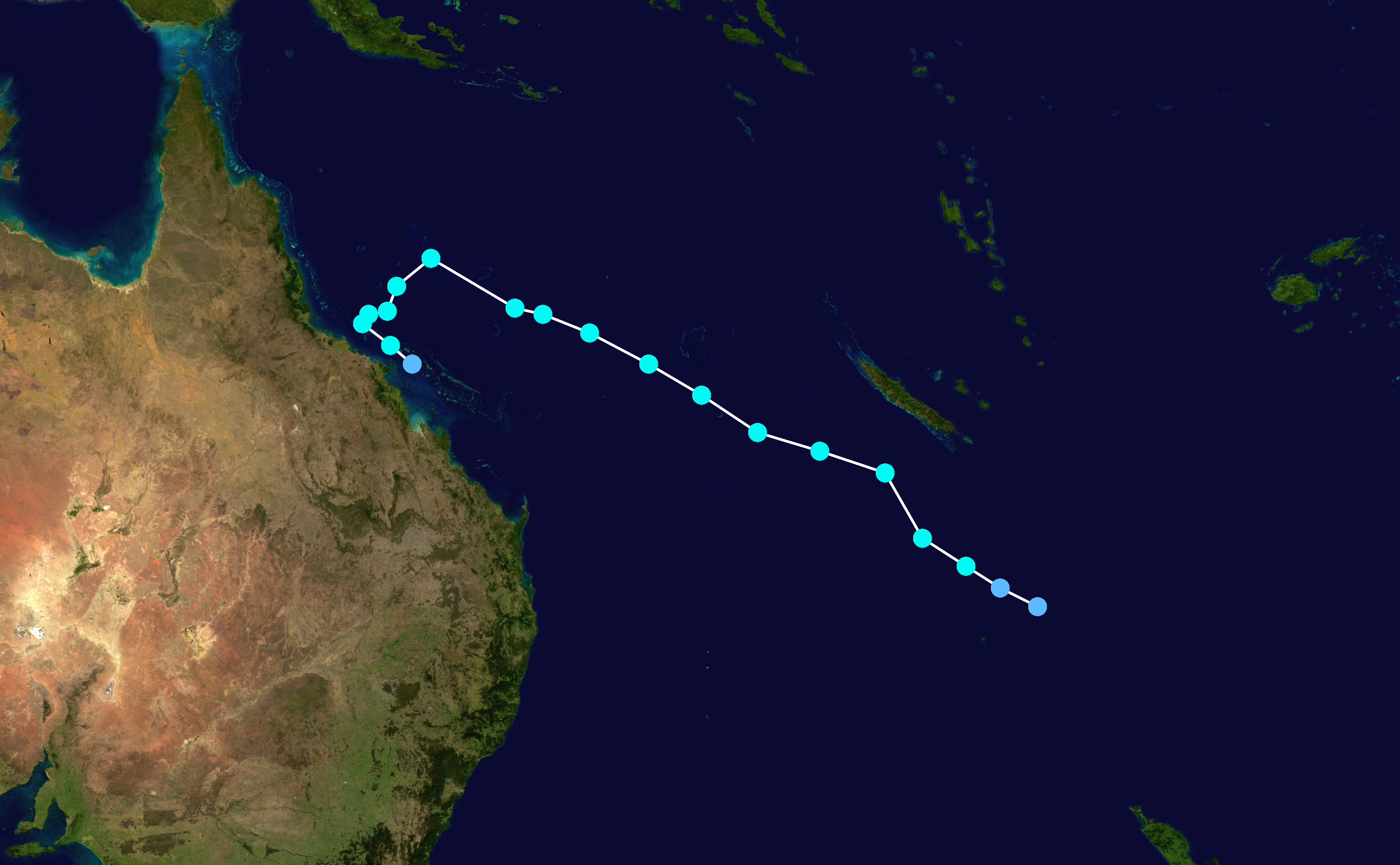
- Duration: January 18 – January 20 (Crossed 160°E)
- Peak intensity: 95 km/h (60 mph) (10-min); 986 hPa (mbar)

On January 18, Cyclone Vera developed offshore Queensland. After moving northeastward, it then curved to the southeast. On January 20, Vera crossed 160°E and entered the South Pacific basin.

=== Tropical Cyclone Wanda ===
- Category 2 tropical cyclone (Australian scale)
- Tropical storm (SSHWS)
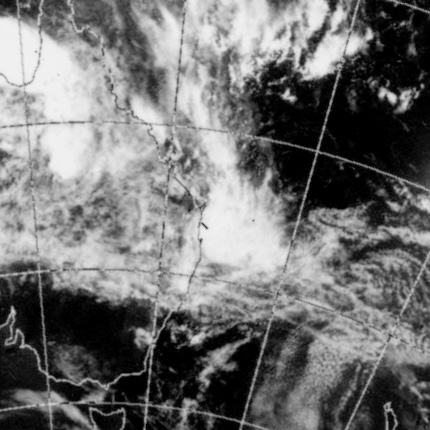
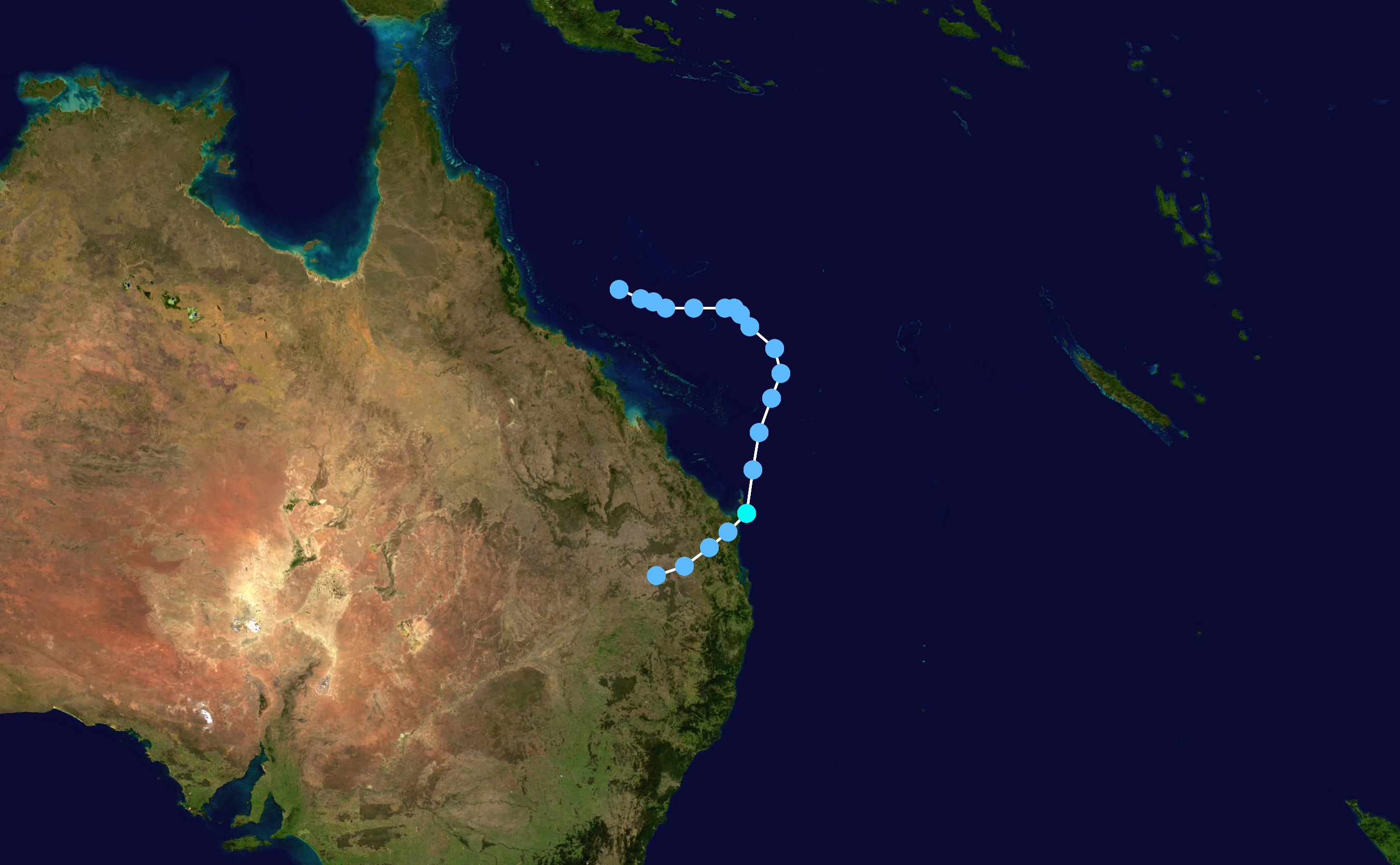
- Duration: January 20 – January 25
- Peak intensity: 95 km/h (60 mph) (10-min); 997 hPa (mbar)

This cyclone existed from 24 January to 27 January 1974 and led to extensive flooding over southeast Queensland. Although this tropical cyclone was relatively weak, it dropped enormous quantities of rain on south-eastern Queensland and north-eastern New South Wales over the Australia Day (26–27 January) weekend, resulting in some of the worst flooding seen in a century. The Queensland state capital, Brisbane, fared particularly badly, with fourteen lives lost and parts of the city submerged under 2 metres of the Brisbane River. In northern New South Wales, a further two fatalities were reported. The cyclone's final toll: 16 dead, over 300 injured; 56 homes destroyed, a further 1,600 submerged; 8000 people left homeless.

- The Corinda Landslip
- Australian Bureau of Meteorology article: The Big Wet - January 1974
- Natural Disasters in Australia

=== Severe Tropical Cyclone Pam ===
- Category 5 severe tropical cyclone (Australian scale)
- Category 2 tropical cyclone (SSHWS)
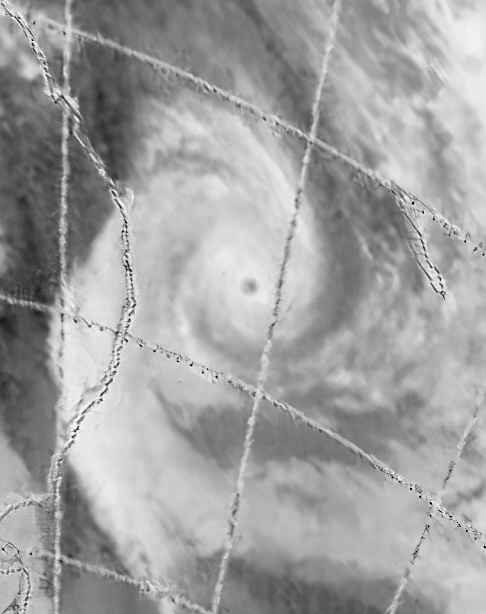
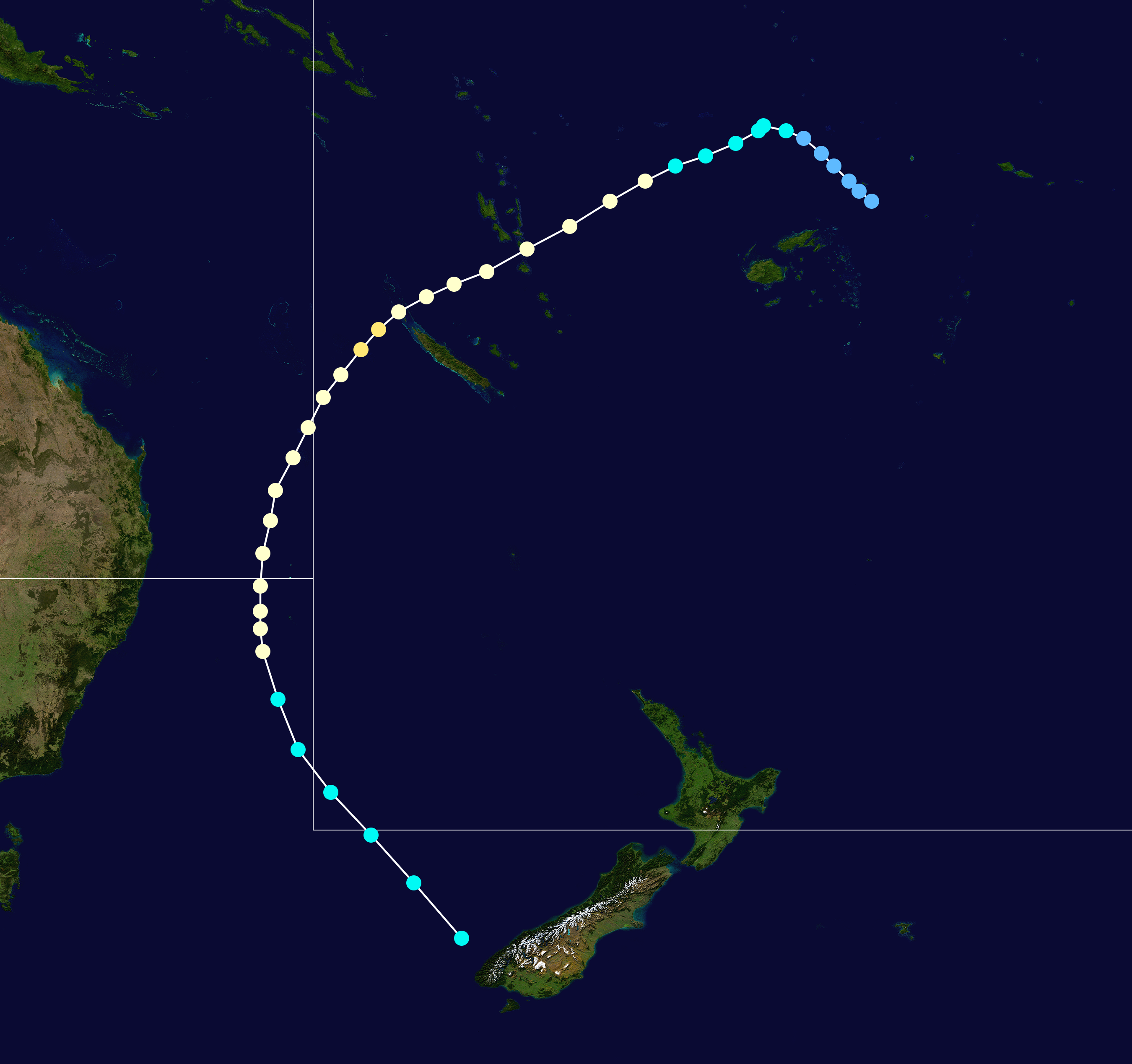
- Duration: February 4 – February 8
- Peak intensity: 205 km/h (125 mph) (10-min); 928 hPa (mbar)

During 4 February Severe Tropical Cyclone Pam moved south-westwards into the Australian region as a Category 5 severe tropical cyclone, with peak 10-minute sustained wind speeds estimated at 205 km/h (125 mph). Over the next couple of days, Pam passed about 500 km (310 mi) to the east of Brisbane, as it gradually weakened and recurved south-eastwards. The system was last noted during 7 February as it moved back into the South Pacific basin.

=== Tropical Cyclone Yvonne ===
- Category 2 tropical cyclone (Australian scale)
- Tropical storm (SSHWS)
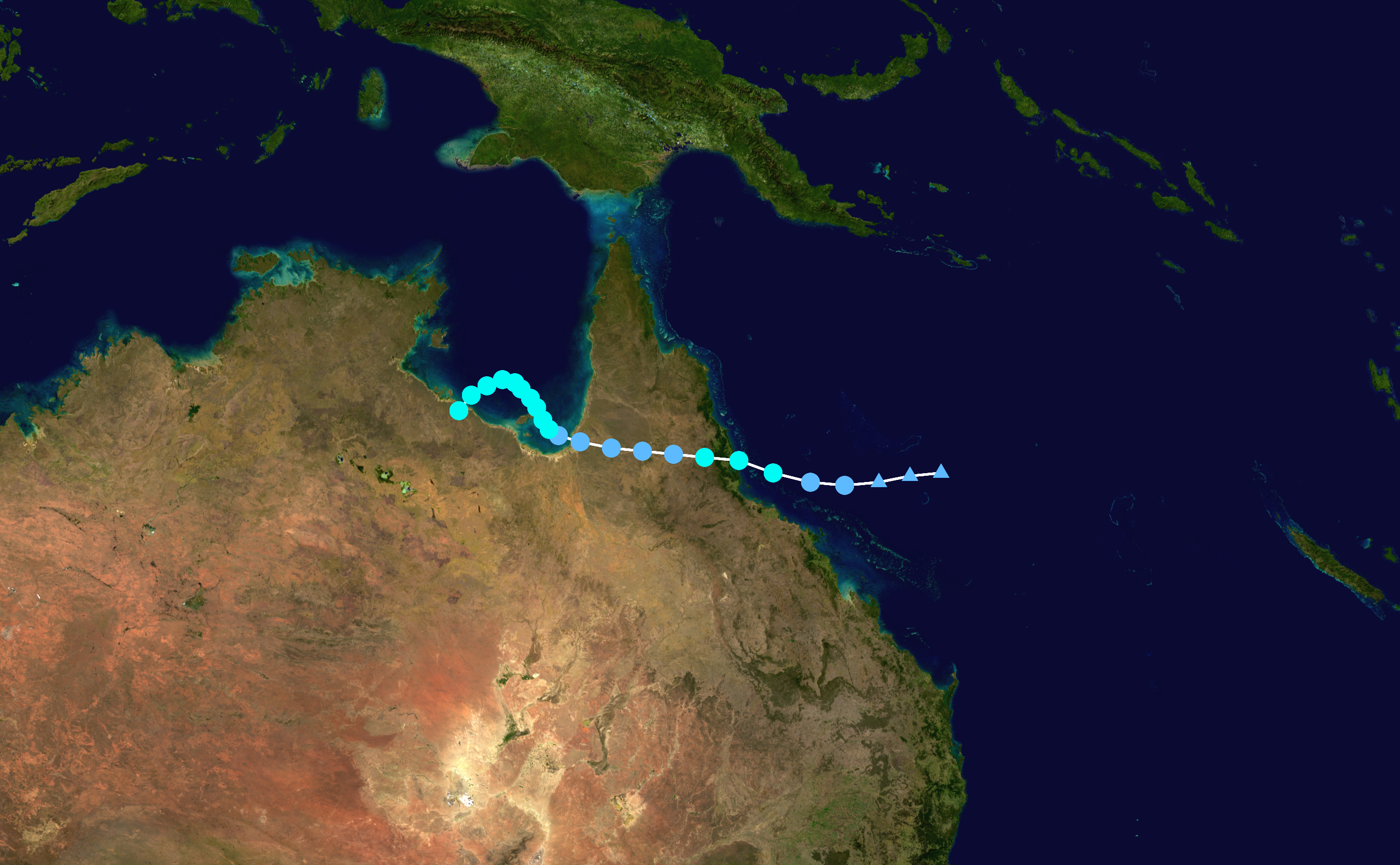
- Duration: February 8 – February 14
- Peak intensity: 100 km/h (65 mph) (10-min); 990 hPa (mbar)

Cyclone Yvonne developed on February 8 and struck the Cape York Peninsula.

=== Severe Tropical Cyclone Helen ===
- Category 3 severe tropical cyclone (Australian scale)
- Category 1 tropical cyclone (SSHWS)
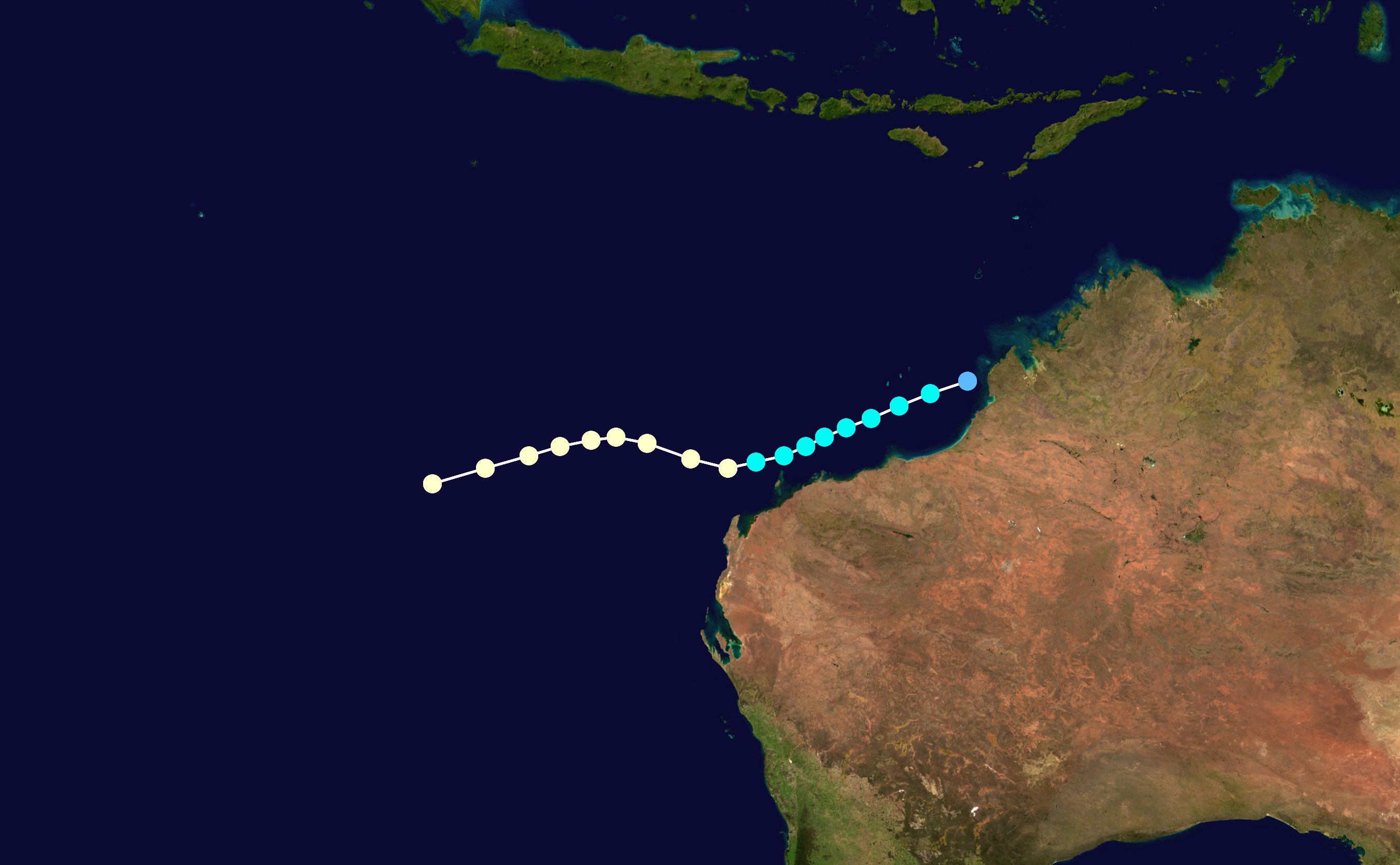
- Duration: February 28 – March 8
- Peak intensity: 130 km/h (80 mph) (10-min); 973 hPa (mbar)

On February 28, Cyclone Helen formed offshore Western Australia. Moving generally westward, it dissipated on March 8.

=== Severe Tropical Cyclone Zoe ===
- Category 3 severe tropical cyclone (Australian scale)
- Category 1 tropical cyclone (SSHWS)
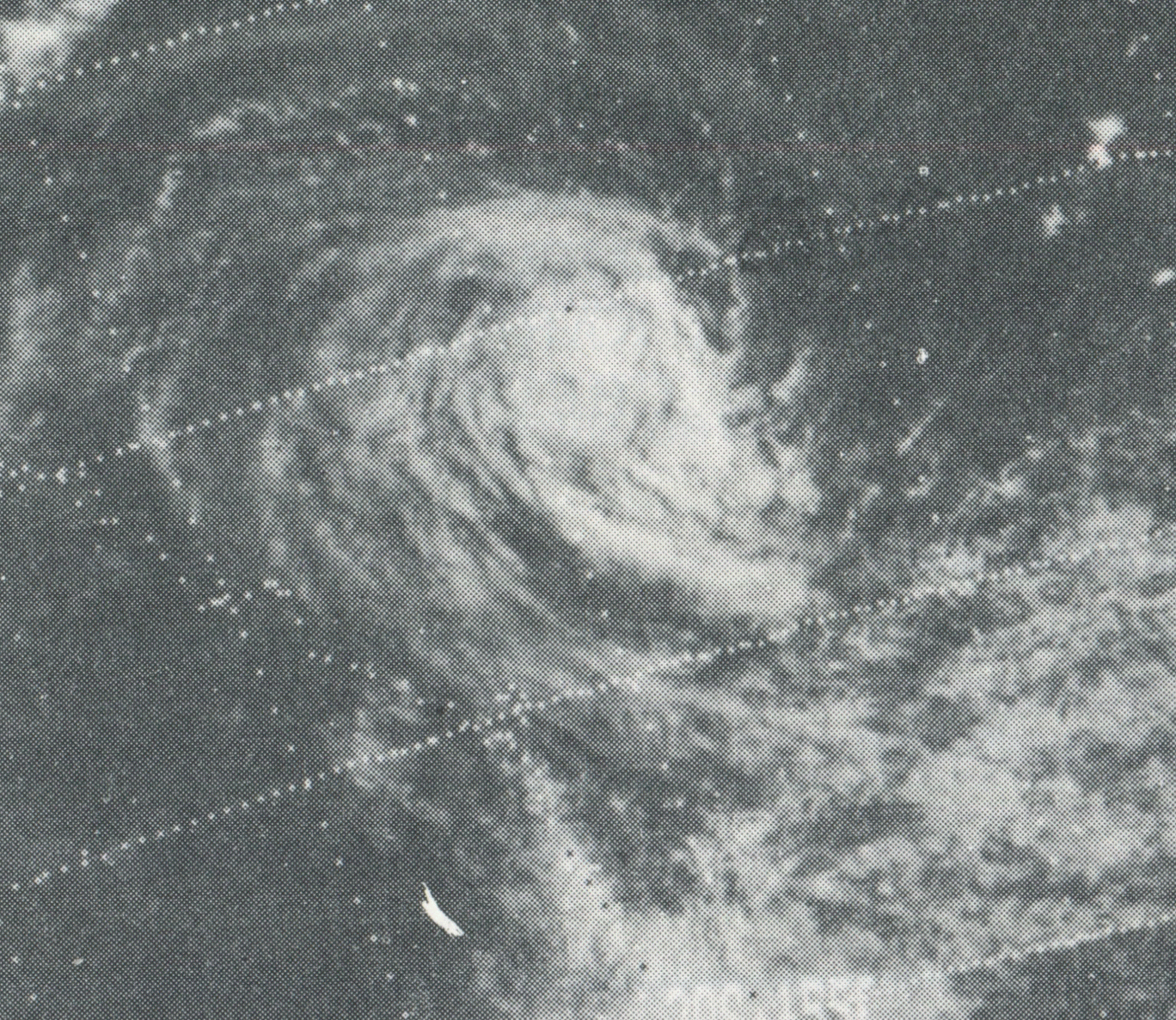
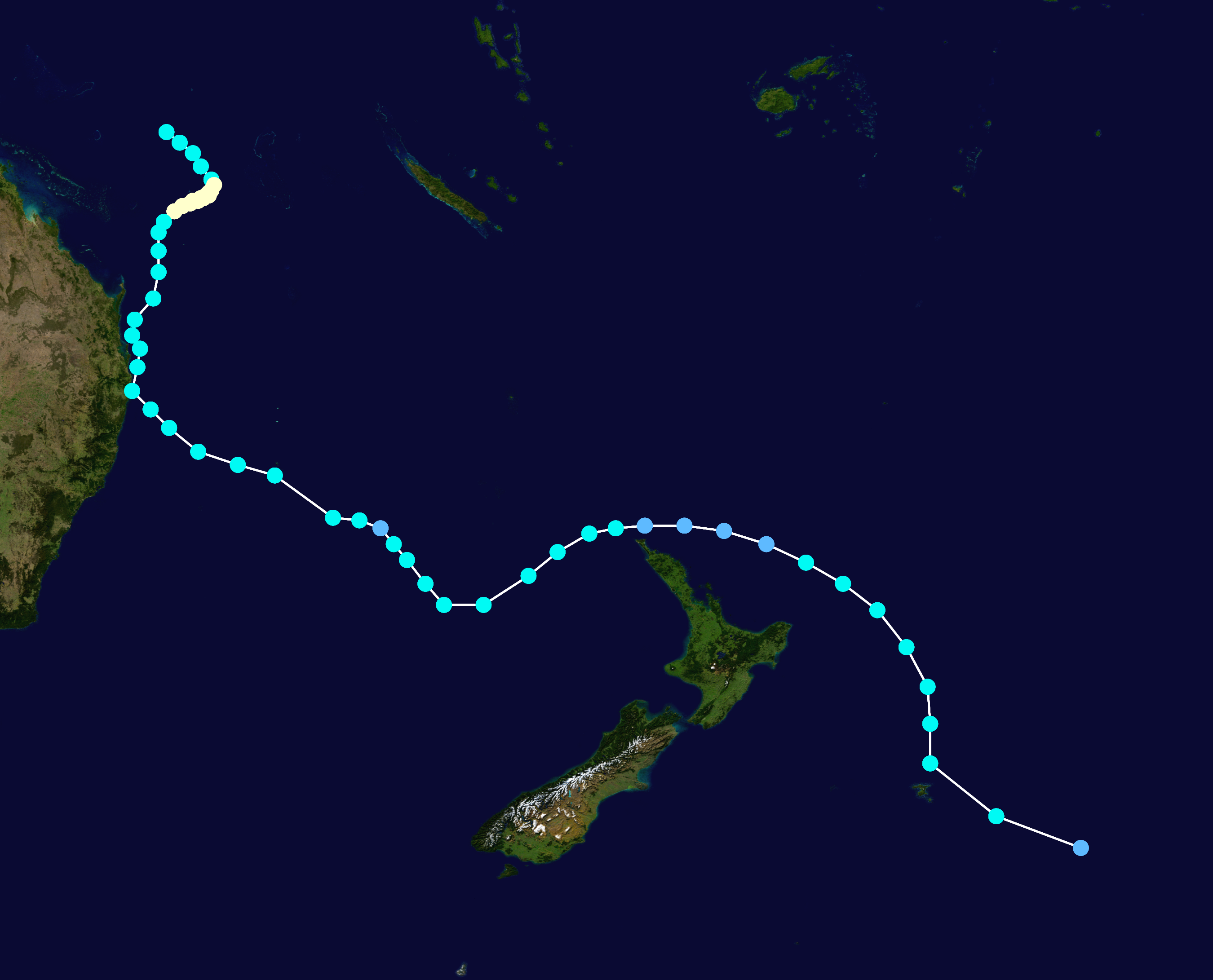
- Duration: March 6 – March 14
- Peak intensity: 140 km/h (85 mph) (10-min); 968 hPa (mbar)

Cyclone Zoe was named and detected on 9 March 1974 when it was northeast of Brisbane. In the following days it moved steadily southward and interacted with an already-exiting trough in the easterlies to produce sustained and very heavy rainfall all along the coast from Brisbane south almost to Sydney. In the four days between 10 and 13 March, Brisbane received 419.4 millimetres (16.51 in) and some places in the Northern Rivers region of New South Wales received as much as 700 millimetres (28 in). With catchments already saturated by heavy January rains, record flooding occurred on the Richmond River, which reached a height of 12.17 metres (39.9 ft).

=== Severe Tropical Cyclone Isobel ===
- Category 3 severe tropical cyclone (Australian scale)
- Category 1 tropical cyclone (SSHWS)
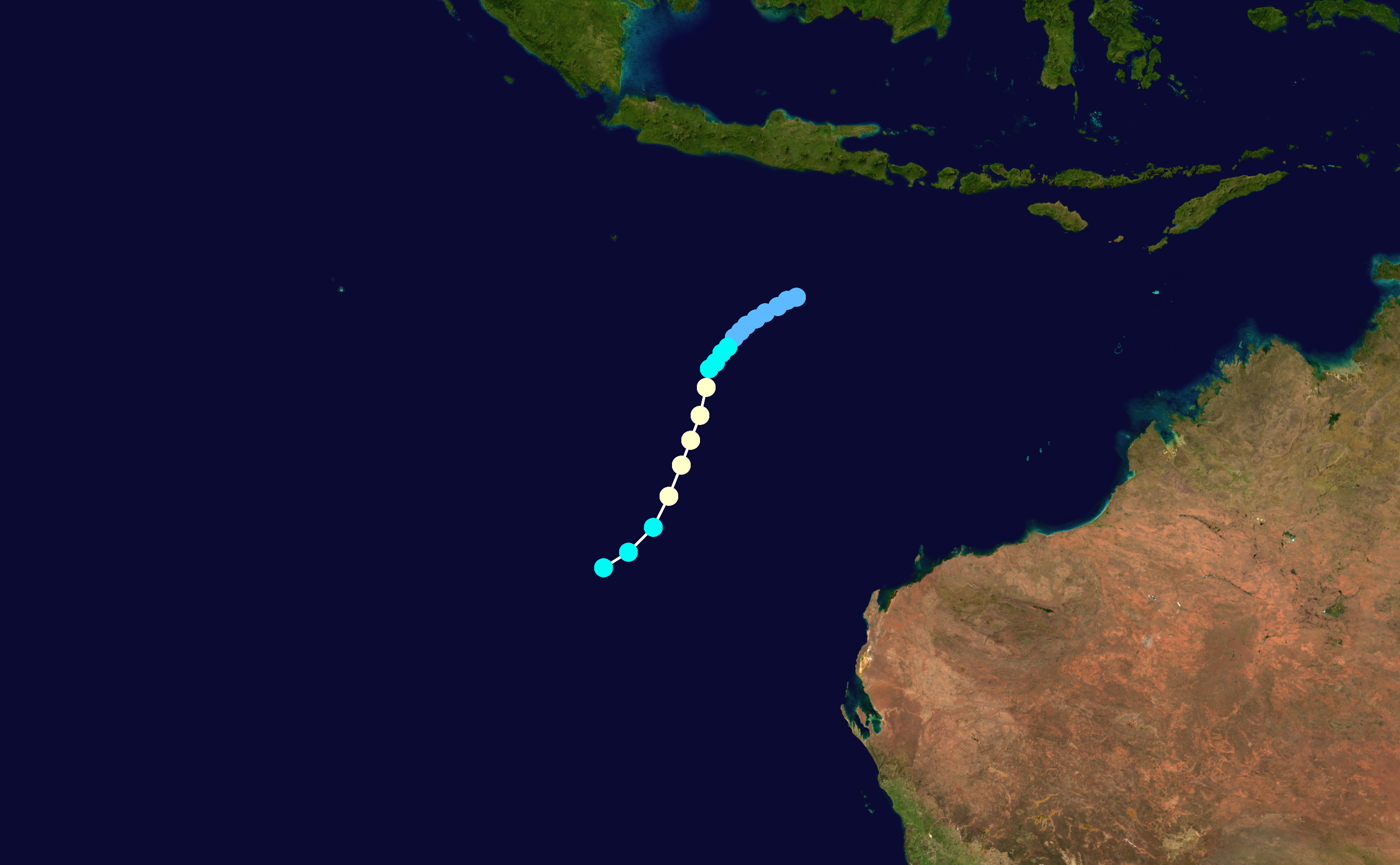
- Duration: March 9 – March 17
- Peak intensity: 130 km/h (80 mph) (10-min); 973 hPa (mbar)

Cyclone Isobel existed over the South-East Indian Ocean from March 9 to March 17.

=== Severe Tropical Cyclone Jessie ===
- Category 3 severe tropical cyclone (Australian scale)
- Category 1 tropical cyclone (SSHWS)
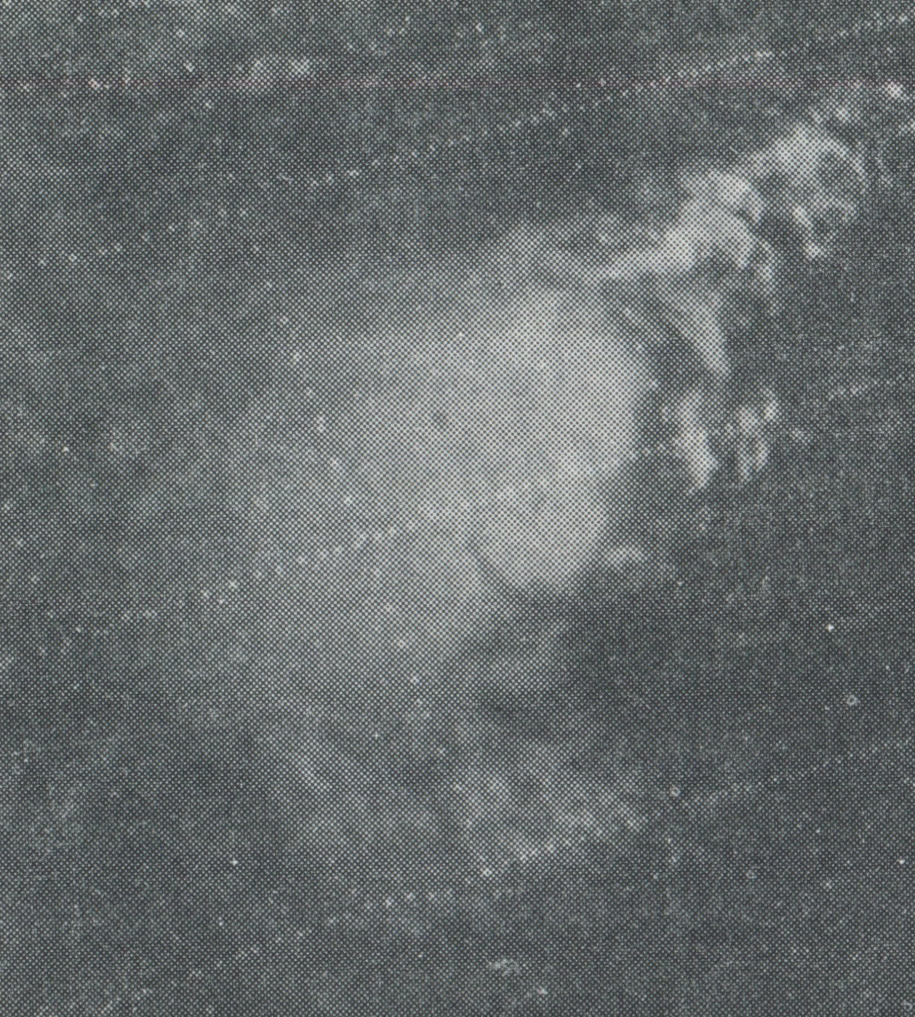
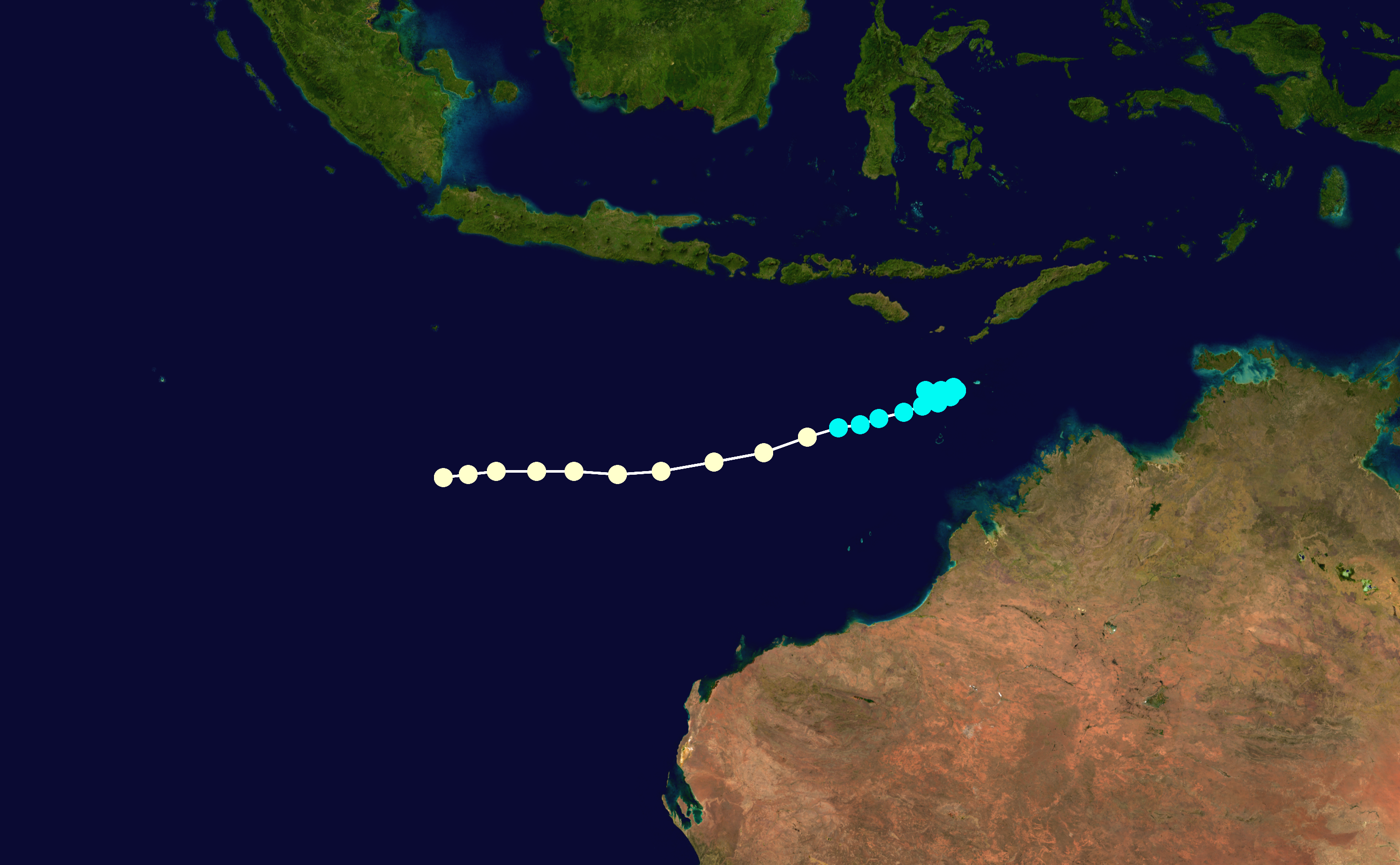
- Duration: March 16 – March 25
- Peak intensity: 150 km/h (90 mph) (10-min); 964 hPa (mbar)

Jessie developed between Indonesia and Western Australia on March 16. Moving west-southwestward, it was last noted on March 25.

=== Tropical Cyclone Jenny ===
- Category 2 tropical cyclone (Australian scale)
- Tropical storm (SSHWS)
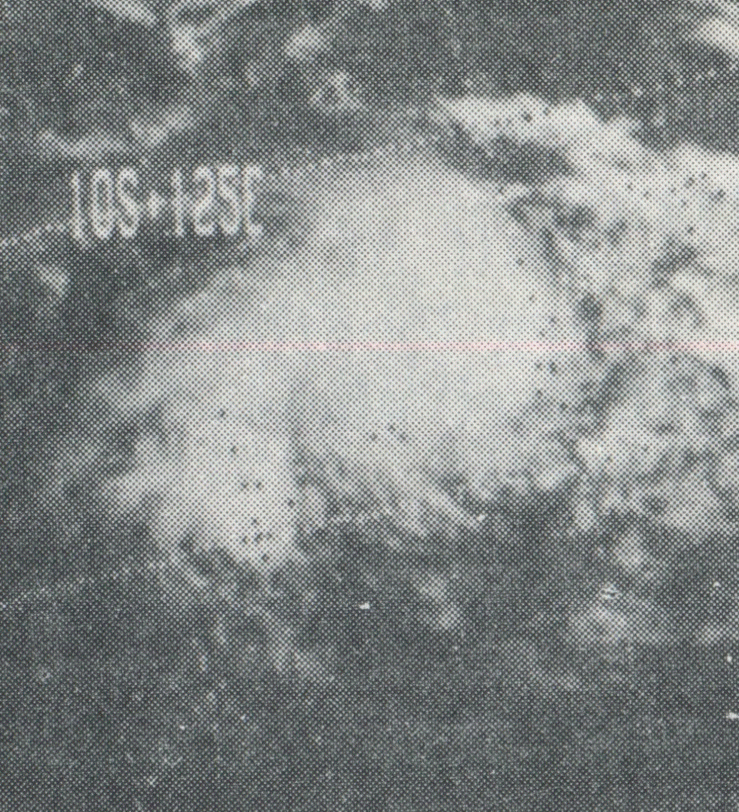
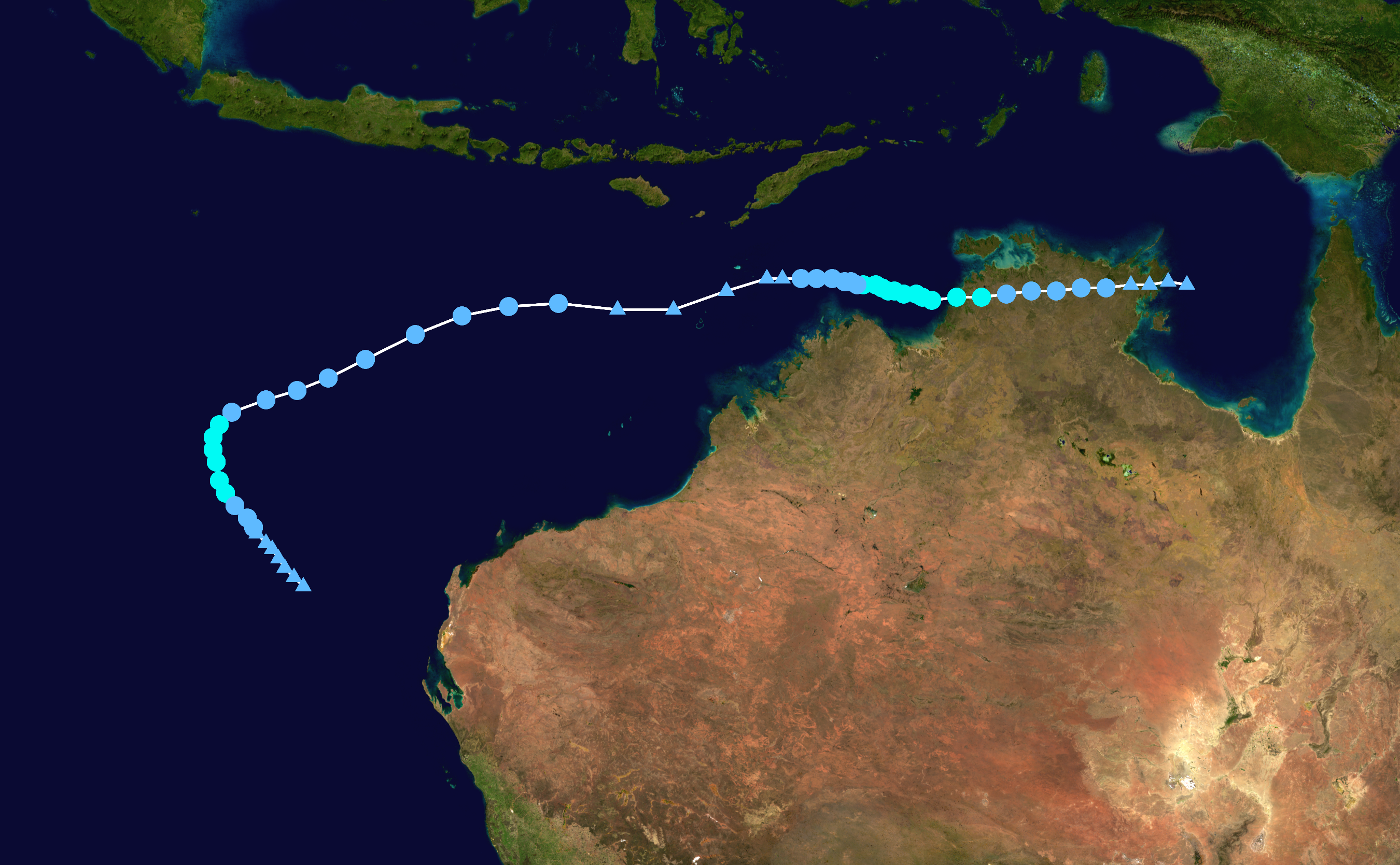
- Duration: March 16 – March 30
- Peak intensity: 95 km/h (60 mph) (10-min); 988 hPa (mbar)

Cyclone Jenny struck northern Western Australia.

=== Tropical Cyclone Alice ===
- Category 1 tropical cyclone (Australian scale)
- Tropical storm (SSHWS)
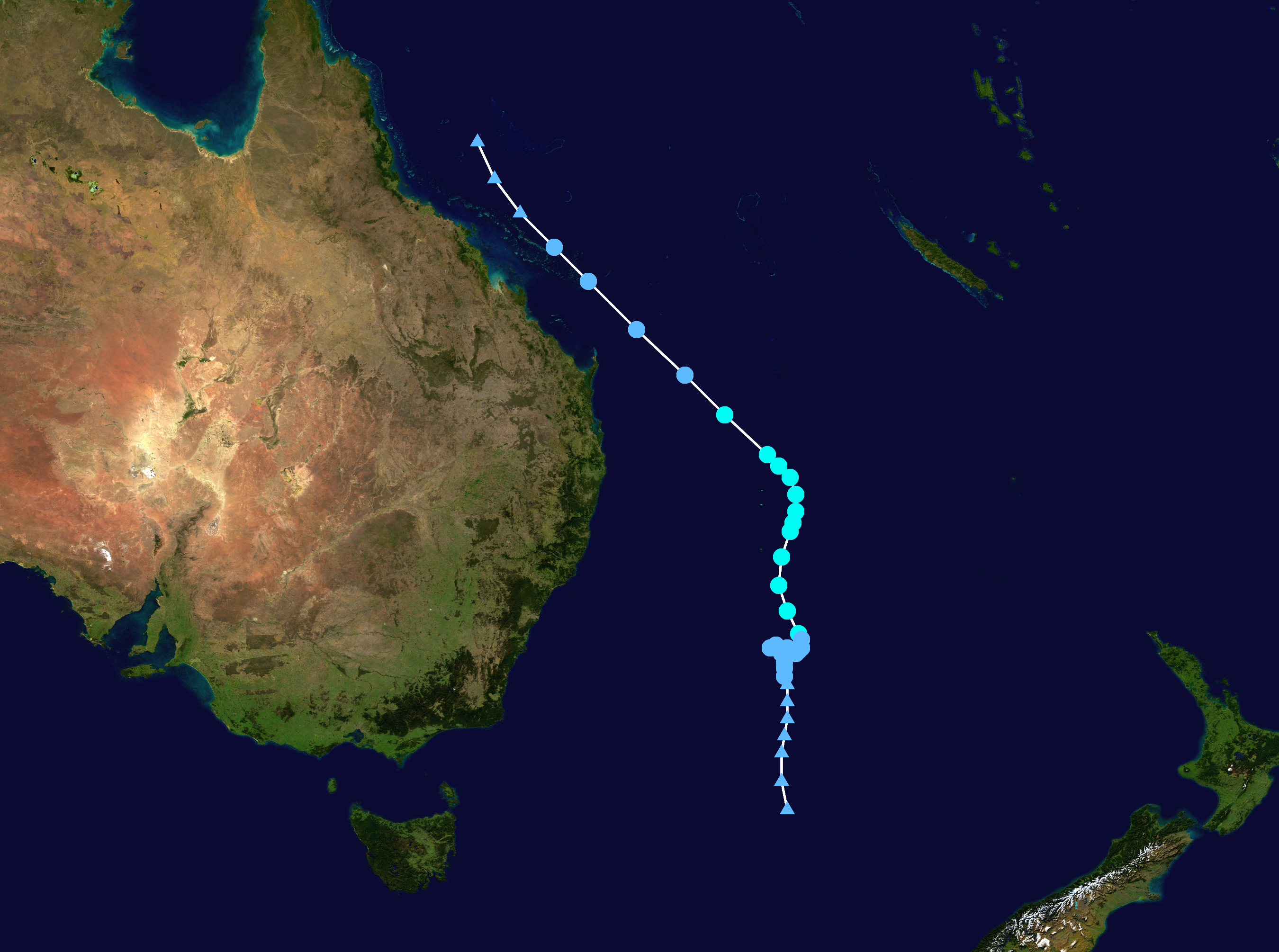
- Duration: March 21 – March 23
- Peak intensity: 75 km/h (45 mph) (10-min); 997 hPa (mbar)

The final system, Cyclone Alice, existed offshore the east coast of Australia from March 21 to March 23.

== See also ==
- Atlantic hurricane seasons: 1973, 1974
- Eastern Pacific hurricane seasons: 1973, 1974
- Western Pacific typhoon seasons: 1973, 1974
- North Indian Ocean cyclone seasons: 1973, 1974
- List of wettest tropical cyclones
