= Roman Aquileia =

Ancient town in Italy

- Aquileia
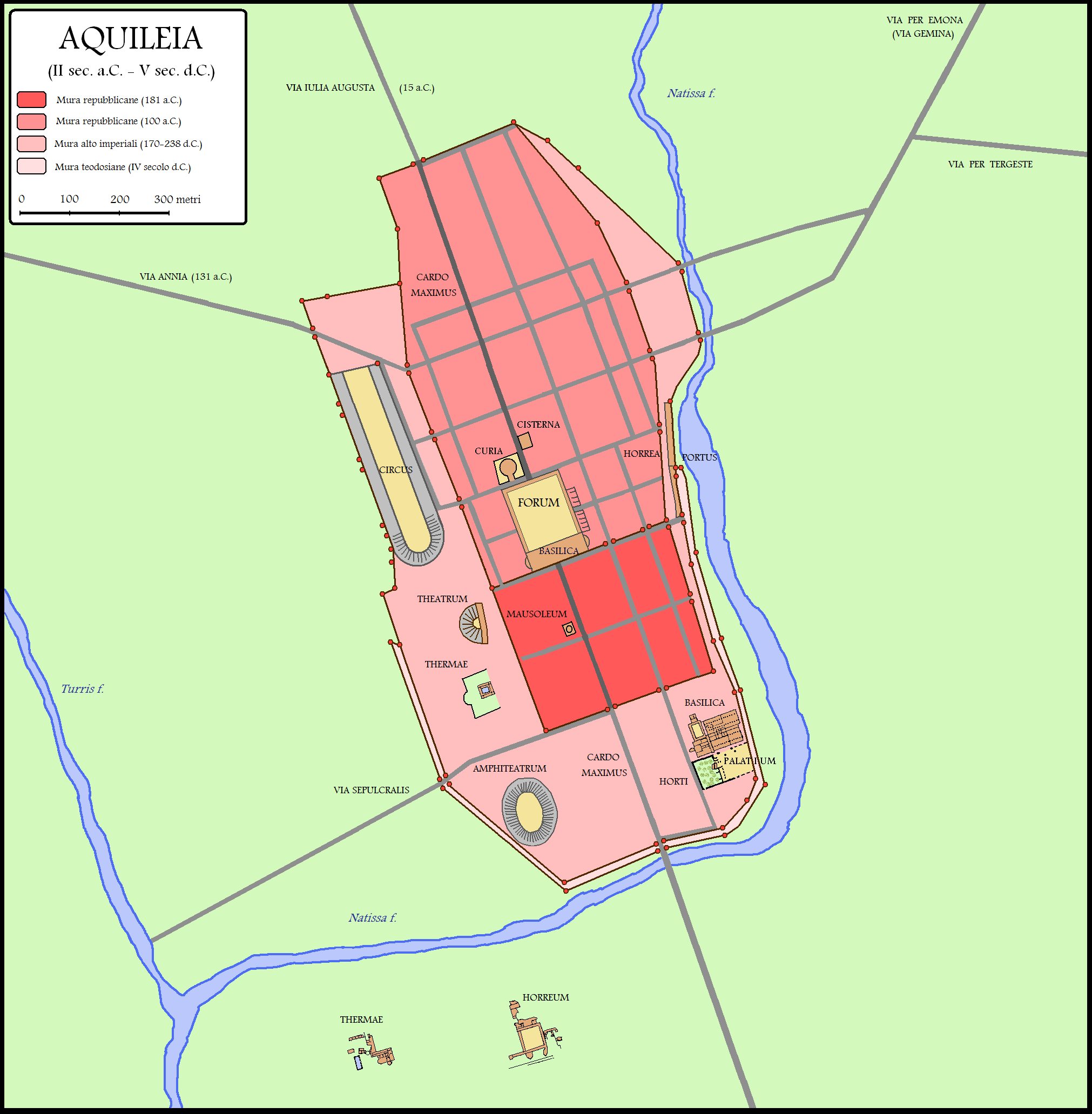
- The ancient Roman city of Aquileia in its development, period by period: from the early republican period (with the walls of the quadrangular legionary castrum in darker pink); to the later period after the construction of the Via Annia (after the victory over the Cimbri) with the walls built in 100 B.C.; to the early imperial city (with the walls built in the period between Emperor Marcus Aurelius and Maximinus Thrax); and to the fourth-century city of Theodosius I. The main monuments of the period are present: the circus, theater, curia, Palatium, baths, river port, etc.

- Location within Italy
- 45°46′24″N 13°21′59″E
- Location: Aquileia, Italy

Aquileia was an ancient town in northeastern Italy, located near the head of the Adriatic Sea. Founded in 181 BC as a Roman military colony, it was originally established to secure the eastern borders of Italy against neighboring tribes such as the Carni and Histri. The city subsequently grew into an important frontier military city. Its strategic location made it an hub for trade and military operations, particularly for Roman expansion toward the Danube. In classical antiquity, Aquileia was a major Roman city with an estimated population close to 100,000 in the 2nd century AD.

Aquileia was one of the first cities in which Christianity could be practised unhindered; the Patriarch of Aquileia was the second most important person of the Western Church after the bishop of Rome. In the 4th century, the construction of the Patriarchal Basilica under Bishop Theodore marked the city as an important religious center. However, the city's decline began after being sacked by Attila the Hun in 452 AD. Aquileia remained a religious center, though its military significance waned. Over time, the patriarchal seat moved to Cividale del Friuli for greater security. In the 8th century, Aquileia's significance was further diminished, but the city experienced a revival around the year 1000.

The remains of ancient Aquileia, known as the "Archaeological Area of Aquileia and the Patriarchal Basilica," have been part of the UNESCO World Heritage List since 1998. The Museo Archeologico Nazionale di Aquileia, situated in the modern town, showcases archaeological artifacts from the ancient city.

== Overview ==
In 452 AD, it was destroyed by the hordes of Attila's Huns.

Aquileia, which is closest to the gulf of the Adriatic Sea was founded by the Romans, fortified against the barbarians from the interior. One goes up with ships to the city by ascending along the course of the Natiso for about 60 stadia. it served as an emporium to those Illyrian peoples living along the Istro. They come to be supplied with products from the sea, such as wine, which they put into wooden barrels by loading it onto wagons, and also oil, while the people of the area come to buy slaves, cattle and leather. Aquileia lies across the border from the Veneti. The border is marked by a river that flows down from the Alps and through which, with a navigation of 1,200 stadia, one goes up to the city of Noreia.

— Strabo, Geographica, V, 1, 8.

This is how Herodian describes it at the time of his 238 siege by the troops of Maximinus Thrax:

Before these events occurred, Aquileia was a very large city with a very large stable population. Located on the sea, it had all the Illyrian provinces behind it. Aquileia was used as a port of entry to Italy. The city had, thus, made it possible for goods to be transported from the interior by land or rivers, to be exchanged with merchant ships. [Goods] were, in addition, transported from the sea to the mainland as needed, when goods were not produced locally, due to the cold climate, but sent up to the mountainous areas. Since agriculture in the hinterland had many people employed in wine production, they exported large quantities of wine to markets that could not grow vines there. The large number of people living permanently in Aquileia consisted not only of native residents, but also of foreigners and traders. At this time the city was even more crowded than usual. All the people from the surrounding area had left the small towns or villages and fled [to the big city]. They placed their hopes of safety in the large city and its defensive walls. These ancient walls, however, had mostly collapsed. Under Roman rule the cities of Italy did not, normally, need walls or weapons. They had substituted lasting peace for war and had also earned the right to participate in Roman rule.

— Herodian, History of the Empire after Marcus Aurelius, VIII, 2.3-4.

== Republican period (181-31 BC). ==
Aquileia was founded in 181 B.C. near the Natissa River as a colony under Latin law, by Lucius Manlius Acidinus, Publius Scipio Nasica and Gaius Flaminius, sent by the senate to bar the way to the neighboring Carni and Histrian peoples who threatened the eastern borders of Italy. It was established in the territory of the Carni:

In the same year 181 BC the colony of Aquileia was deducted in the territory of the Gauls. 3 000 infantrymen received 50 iugera each, the centurions 100, the horsemen 140. The triumvirs who founded the colony were Publius Scipio Nasica, Gaius Flaminius, and Lucius Manlius Acidinus.

— Livy, Ab Urbe condita libri, XL, 34.2-3.

The first settlers were 3,000 veterans, followed by their respective families from Samnium, a total of about 20,000 people, who were followed by groups of Veneti; later, in 169 B.C., another 1,500 families were added, while eastern communities, such as Egyptians, Jews and Syrians, also settled in the city.

It was ruled initially by duumvirs and later by quattuorviri with its own senate. The city first grew as a military outpost in preparation for future campaigns against Histri and Carni, later as "headquarters" for eventual Roman expansion toward the Danube.

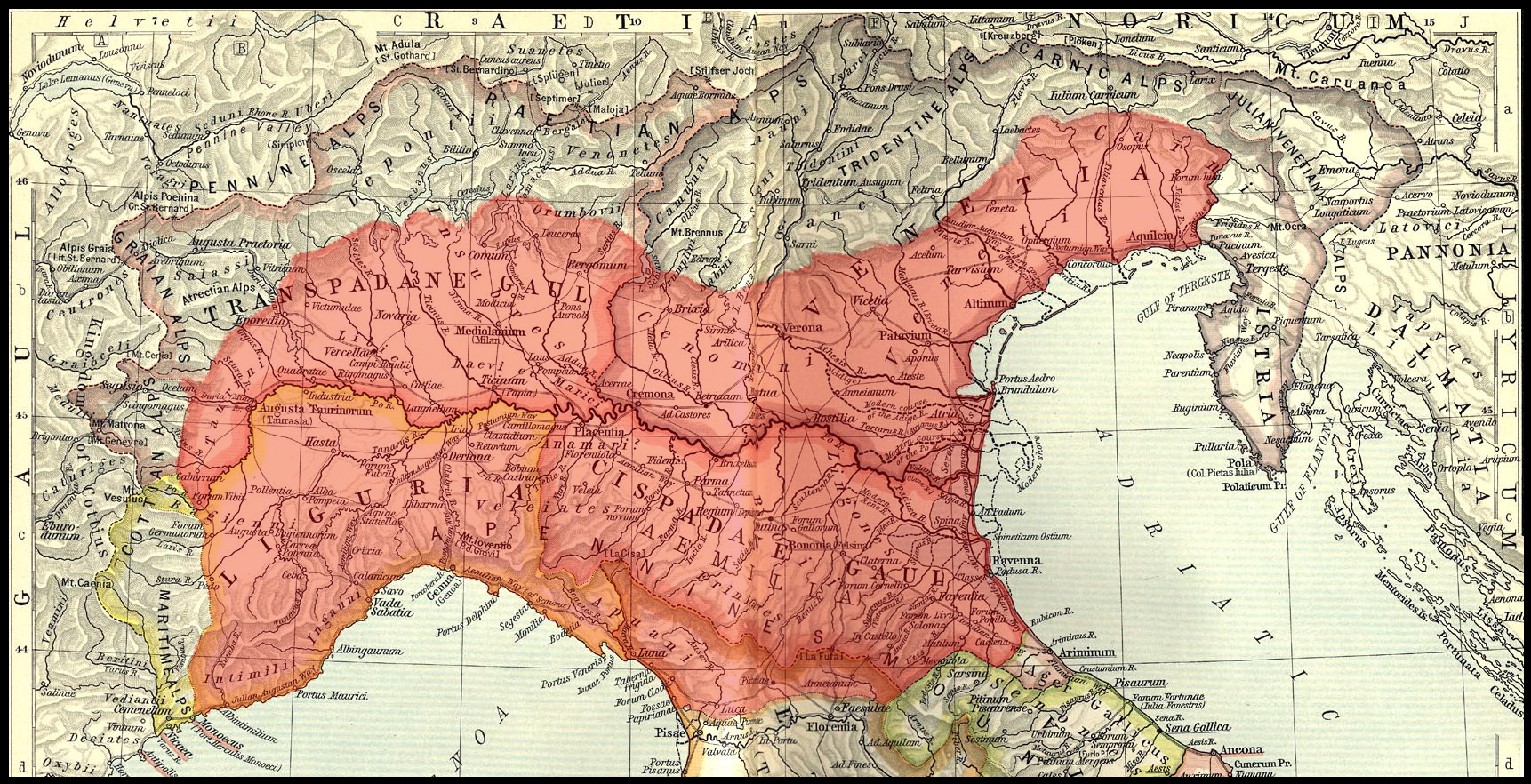
Territories of Cisalpine Gaul (highlighted in transparent red) in the late 2nd and early 1st centuries BC. Aquileia also seems to have belonged to this province.

Aquileia formed the main base of the military operations in Illyricum of the consuls Lucius Cornelius Lentulus Lupus, Gaius Marcius Figulus, and Publius Cornelius Scipio Nasica Corculum, during the years 156-155 BC, against the Dalmatian tribes, which then led to the conquest of the city of Delminium. In 129 B.C. consul Gaius Sempronius Tuditanus attacked the Histrian peoples of Iapodes and Liburni from northern Italy (from his "headquarters" in Aquileia, as reflected in a eulogy dedicated to him), and later also defeated the Alpine peoples of the Carni and Taurisci (from the area of Nauportus), earning for these successes the Triumph. Ten years later, in 119 BC. Lucius Caecilius Metellus completed a new victorious campaign against the Dalmatians, using Aquileia as the base of his operations, celebrating his triumph the following year and earning himself the victorious title of Delmaticus. Four years later, in 115 BC, the consul Marcus Aemilius Scaurus operated in Cisalpine Gaul against both the Ligurians in the west and the Carni and Taurisci in the east, using Aquileia, in the latter case, as his "headquarters." Still two years later, in 113 B.C., the consul Gnaeus Papirius Carbo was sent to confront an invasion of Germanic-Celtic peoples (including the Cimbri), who had penetrated Illyricum and then Noricum. Carbo, at the head of an army that had Aquileia as its headquarters, was however defeated near Noreia.

From its origin as a military base derives the four-sided shape of the garrison, divided by the cardo maximus, today's Via Julia Augusta, and the decumanus maximus. Once the region had been pacified and Romanized, the city, a municipium after 89 B.C. as a result of the lex Iulia de civitate (which conferred the fullness of Roman law, assigning it to the Velina tribe), grew larger in successive stages, as attested by the various city walls. It became a political-administrative center (capital of the Tenth Augustan Region, Venetia et Histria) and a prosperous emporium, benefiting from the long port system and the radius of important roads that ran from it both northward, beyond the Alps and as far as the Baltic Sea ("amber road"), and latitudinally, from Gaul to the East. From late Republican times and throughout most of the Imperial era Aquileia constituted one of the great nerve centers of the Roman Empire. Notable was its artistic life, sustained by the wealth of patrons and the intensity of trade and contacts. Its location made the city a crossroads of trade in glass, iron and amber; a wine named Pucinum was also produced.

It was precisely during this period that Aquileia gained increasing strategic-military importance. It was to serve as an advanced post protecting northern Italy against possible invasions from the north and east, as happened:

- at the time of the Cimbrian Wars in 102 BCE;
- when Mithridates VI of Pontus planned an invasion of the peninsula through an alliance with Gauls and Scythians. He hoped that many of the Italic peoples would ally with him in hatred of the Romans, as had happened during the Second Punic War to Hannibal, after the Romans had waged war against him in Spain. He knew, moreover, that almost all of Italy had rebelled against the Romans on two occasions in the last thirty years: at the time of the social war of 90-88 B.C. and in the gladiator Spartacus' servile war of 73-71 B.C.
- for the formation of the powerful kingdom of the Dacian tribes by their king Burebista.

Bust of the young Octavian, future emperor Augustus, who led several military campaigns from Aquileia against the Histri, Pannonians, and Dalmatians (City Archaeological Museum).

During his first consulship in 59 B.C., Gaius Julius Caesar, with the support of the other triumvirs (Pompey and Crassus), obtained by the Lex Vatinia of March 1 the proconsulate of the provinces of Cisalpine Gaul and Illyricum for five years and the command of an army consisting of three legions. Shortly afterwards a senatus consultum also added that of Gallia Narbonensis, whose proconsul had died suddenly, and the command of the 10th legion.

The fact that Caesar was initially assigned the province of Illyricum as part of his imperium, and that by early 58 BCE as many as three legions had been stationed in Aquileia, may indicate that he intended to seek glory and riches in this very area with which to increase his military and political power and influence. Caesar needed major military victories so that he could build up his own personal power with which to counterbalance that which Pompey had built up through his victories in the East. To this end he probably planned a campaign beyond the Carnic Alps all the way to the Danube, taking advantage of the growing threat from the tribes of Dacia (roughly corresponding to present-day Romania), which had united under the leadership of Burebista, who had then led his people to conquer the territories located west of the Tisza River, crossing the Danube and subduing the entire area over which the present Hungarian plain stretches, but above all coming dangerously close to Roman Illyricum and Italy. However, his armies had come to a sudden halt, perhaps out of fear of a possible direct intervention by Rome in the Balkan-Carpathian area. Thus, instead of continuing on his march westward, Burebista had returned to his bases in Transylvania, then turned his sights eastward: he attacked the Bastarnae and finally besieged and destroyed the ancient Greek colony of Olbia (near present-day Odessa).

Caesar visited Aquileia several times during the conquest of Gaul: in the winter of 57-56 BC, in connection with military/diplomatic operations conducted by the proconsul himself in the vicinity of Salona around March 3 of that year; in 54 BC to conduct a brief campaign against the Pyrasti people who inhabited southern Illyricum; again in the winters of 54-53 BC. B.C. and 53-52 B.C.; Caesar returned with the legio XV during the following winter, after the city had been attacked along with Tergeste by the Iapydes, when the proconsul was engaged in Gaul against Vercingetorix. The consequence was that the inhabitants of Aquileia were not only forced to repair the damaged walls, but began the construction of two defensive castella: at Tricesimo (50 km north of Aquileia) and at Iulium Carnicum.

In 49 BC, at the outbreak of civil war, Aulus Gabinius was recalled by Caesar and given command of operations in Illyricum. He had three new legions at Aquileia (XXXIII, XXXIV, and XXXV, amounting to 30 total cohorts) and at the head of 15 cohorts and 3,000 cavalry, marching south toward Macedonia, he suffered a sudden attack by the Dalmatians, managing to shelter at Salona with only a few survivors. Eventually he was able to join Lucius Cornificius (who had Legions XXXI and XXXII under his employ) with the few remaining soldiers to fight against these peoples.

Fifteen years later, between 35 and 33 BCE, Aquileia still remained "headquarters" of Octavian's military campaigns in Illyricum. It was at the center of three different routes: the one furthest to the southeast toward the coastal tribes; the "central" one leading into the territories of the Iapydes; and the one furthest to the northeast against the Carni and Taurisci populations.

=== Archaeology of Republican Aquileia ===
In 148 B.C. from Aquileia began the construction of the Via Postumia, which connected the Adriatic with the Tyrrhenian Sea near Genoa. The road was a Roman consular road built by the Roman consul Postumius Albinus in the territories of Cisalpine Gaul, today's Po Valley, mainly for military purposes. Some fifteen years later, in 131 B.C., praetor Titus Annius Rufus started the Via Annia, which connected Hatria (modern Adria) with Patavium (Padua), Altinum (Altino), Iulia Concordia (modern Concordia Sagittaria, where it intersected the Via Postumia) and finally Aquileia.

The remains of the large river port on the Natissa River (piers, warehouses, and roads that connected with the city), built on both sides of the river, can be visited along the Via Sacra and would date as far back as the end of the 2nd century B.C., later expanded and renovated several times. From the earliest times in Aquileia the deities of the Latin pantheon, as well as of the local pantheon, were worshiped. Numerous inscriptions of the soldiers of the garrison, who resided there for about two centuries, bore the cult of Mitra, and later also that of Christianity.

A first century BC inscription mentions a freedman named Lucius Aiacius Dama, possibly originating from Damascus, who describes himself as a "Iudaeus", a Jew.

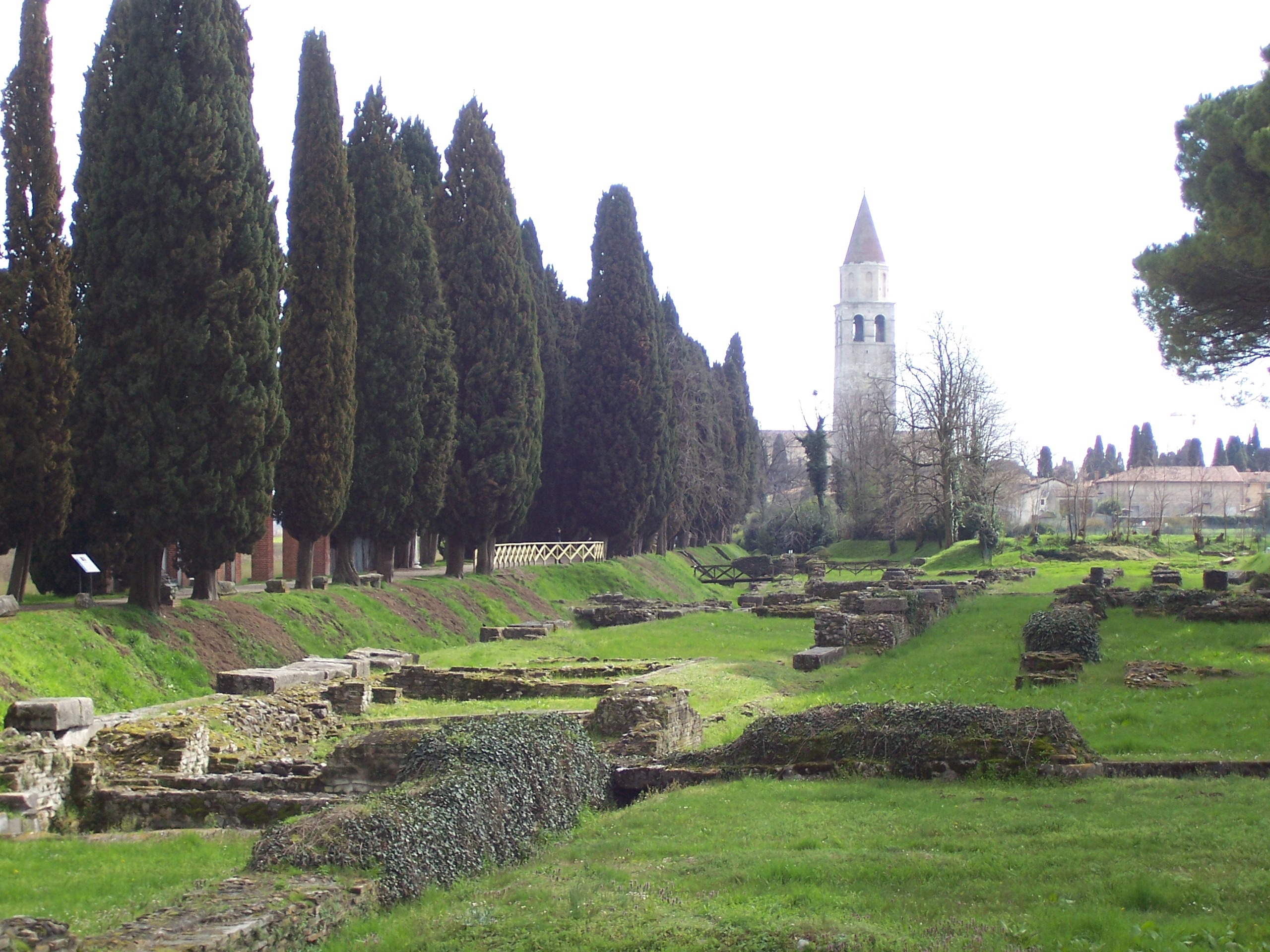
Roman river port (1)

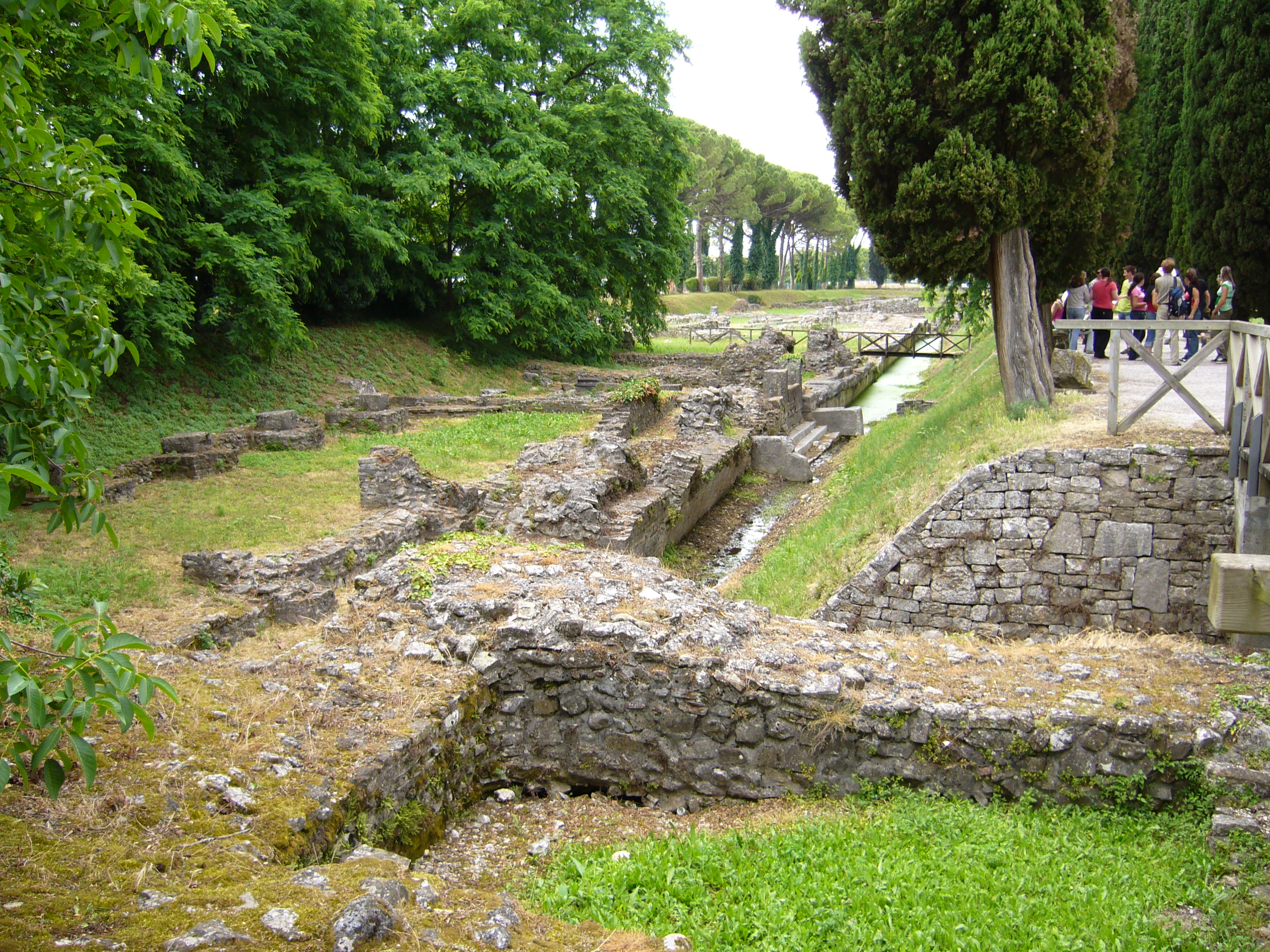
Roman river port (2)

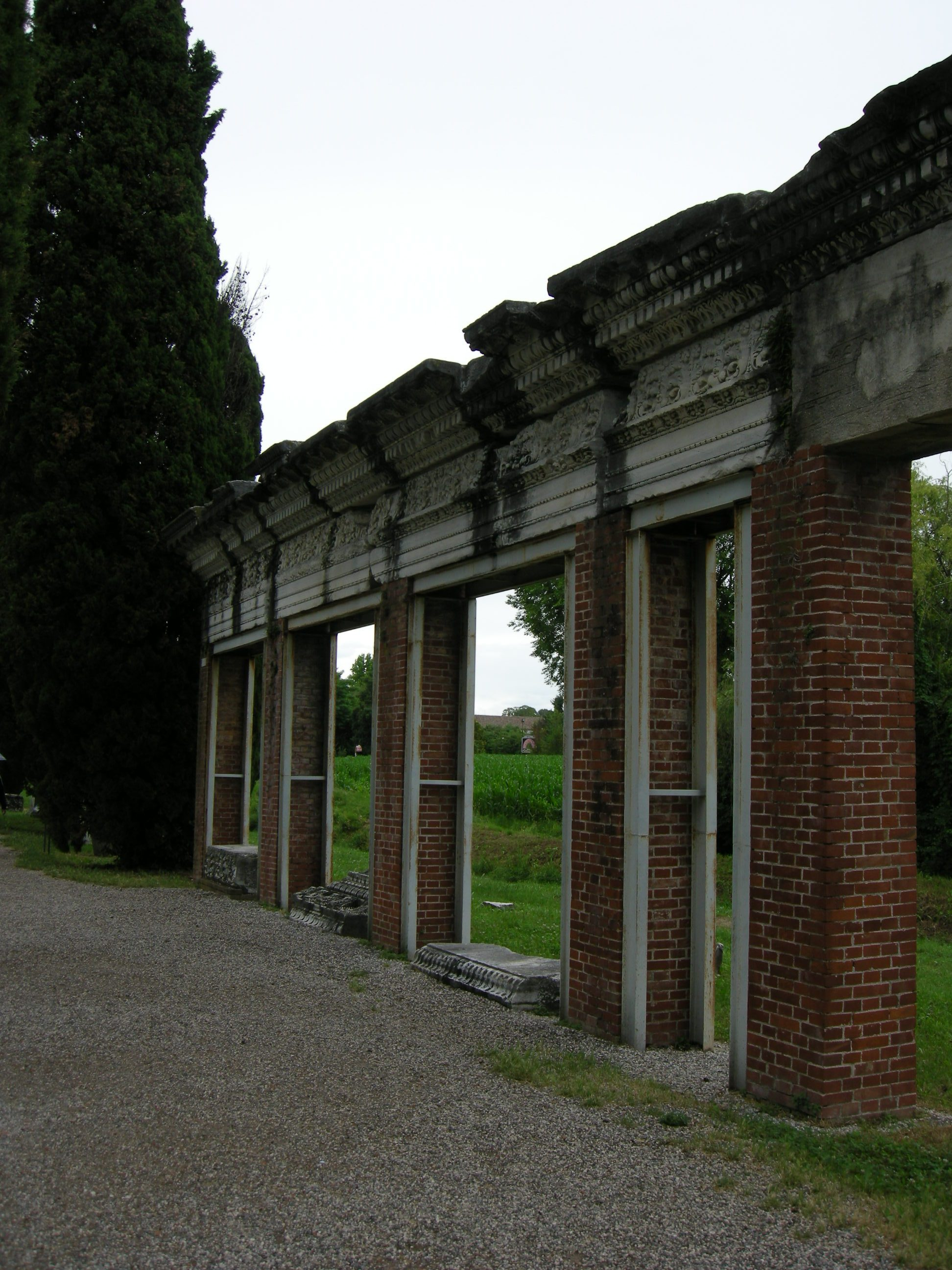
Excavation of the river port (3)

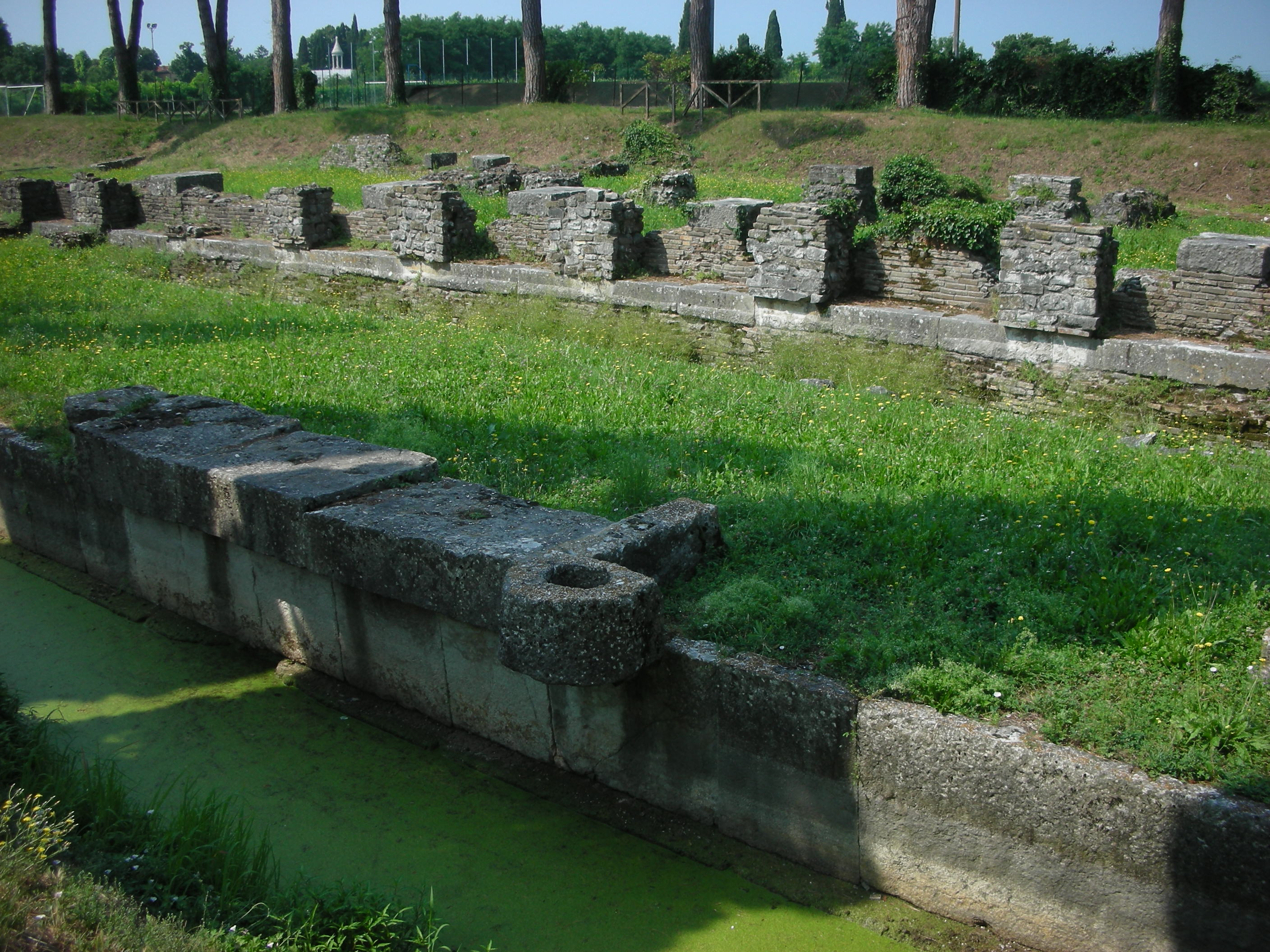
River port (4)

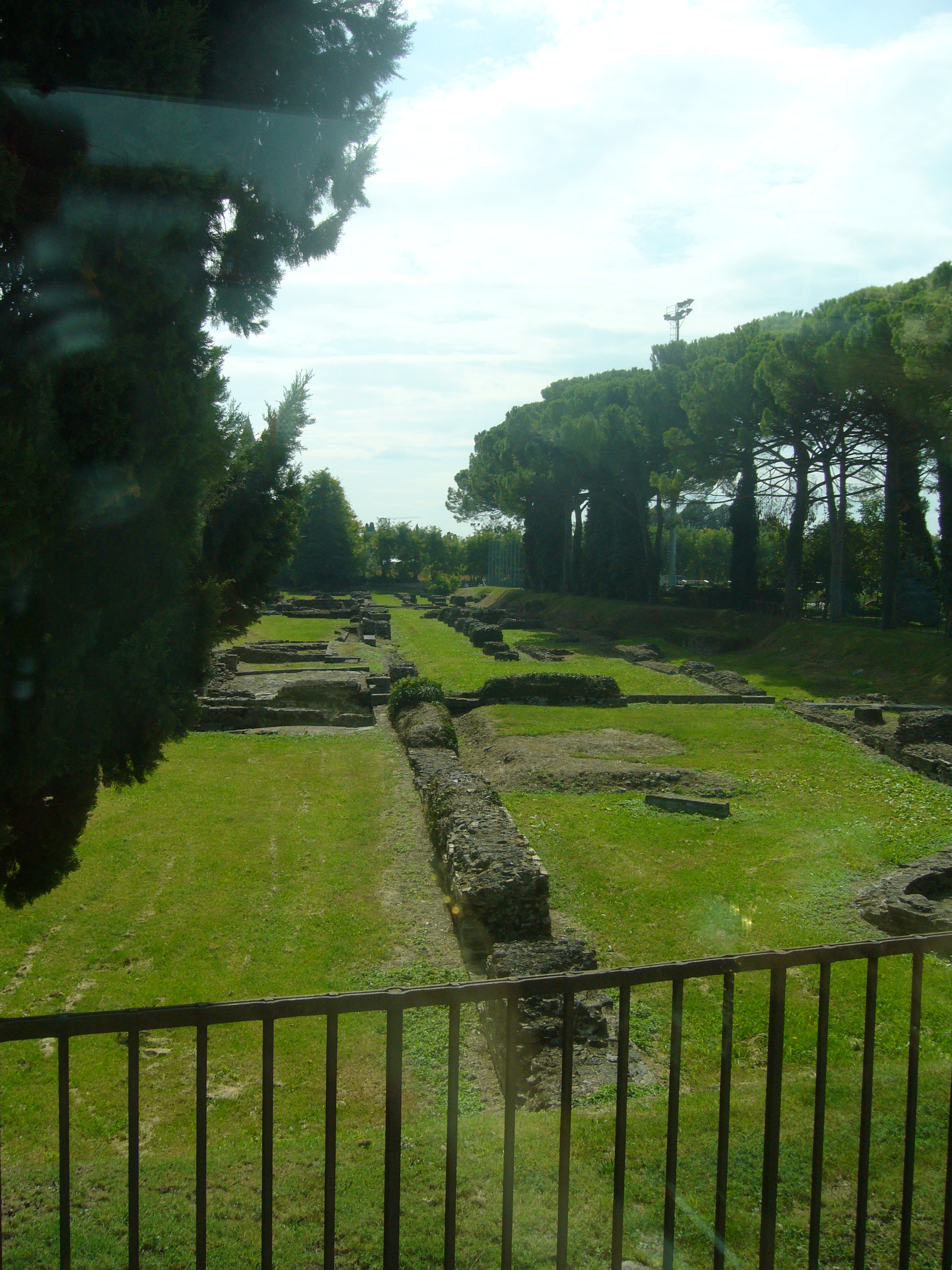
River port (5)

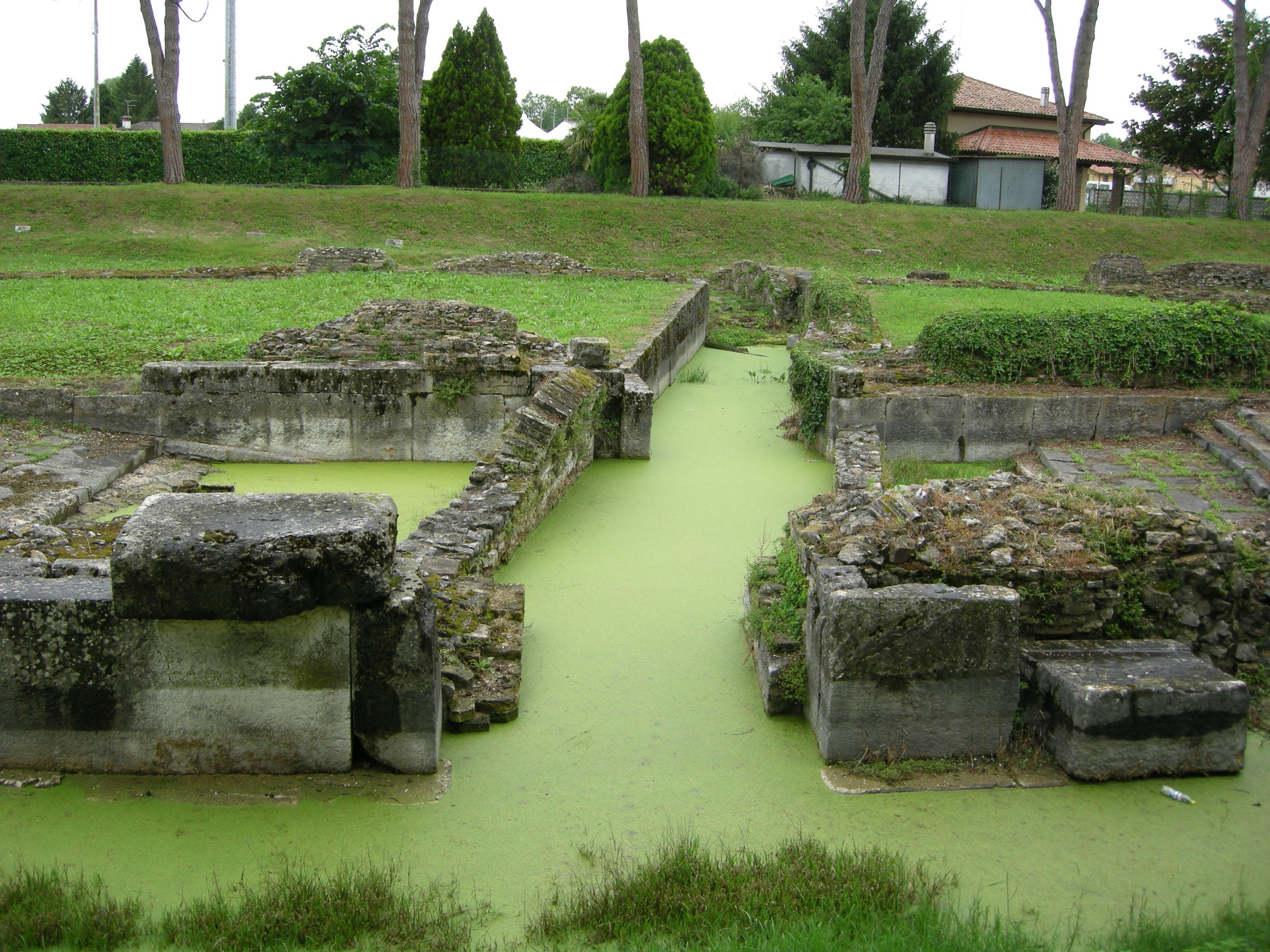
River port (6)

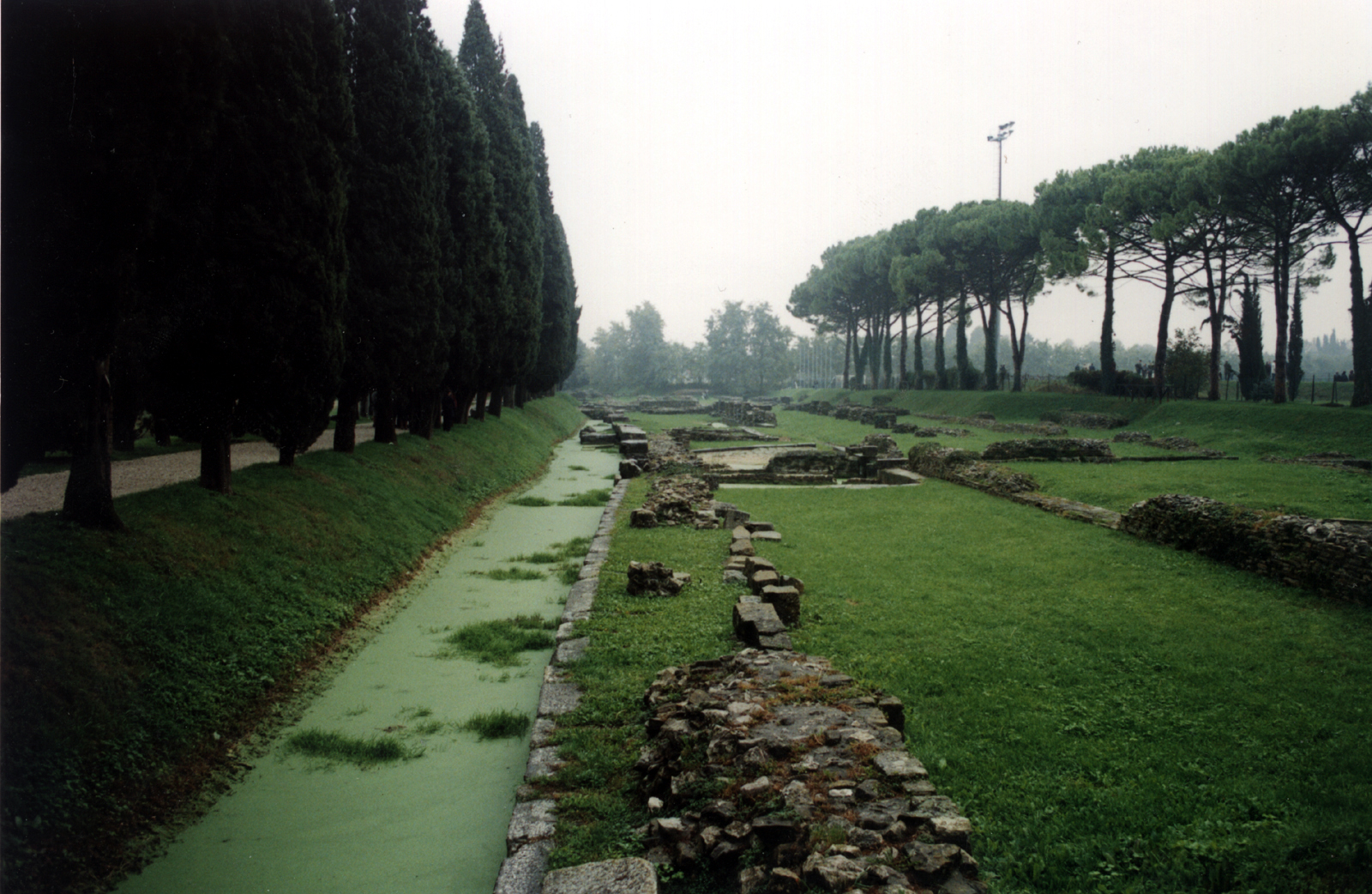
River port (7)

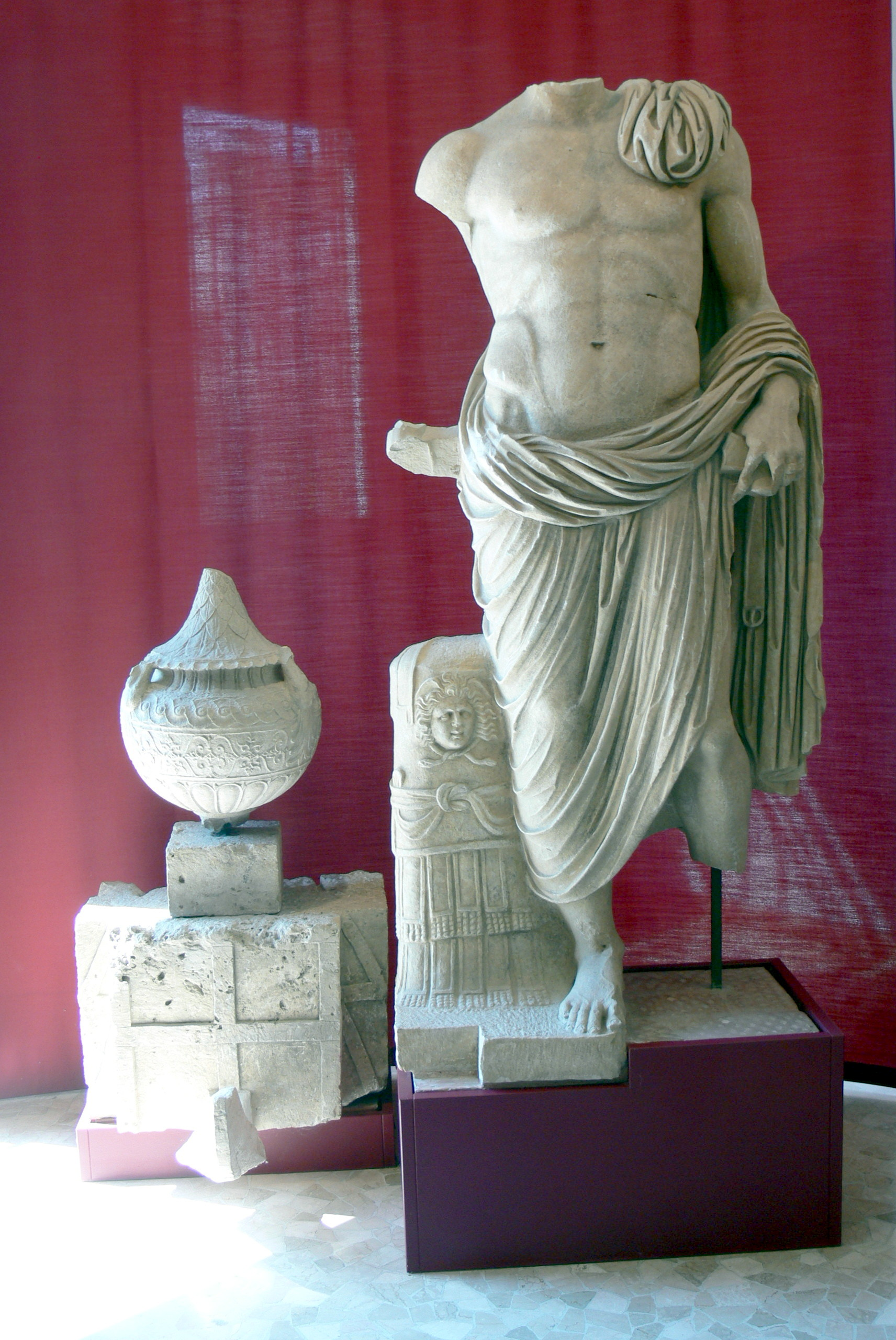
Headless statue belonging to Roman admiral (at the Archaeological Museum of Aquileia).
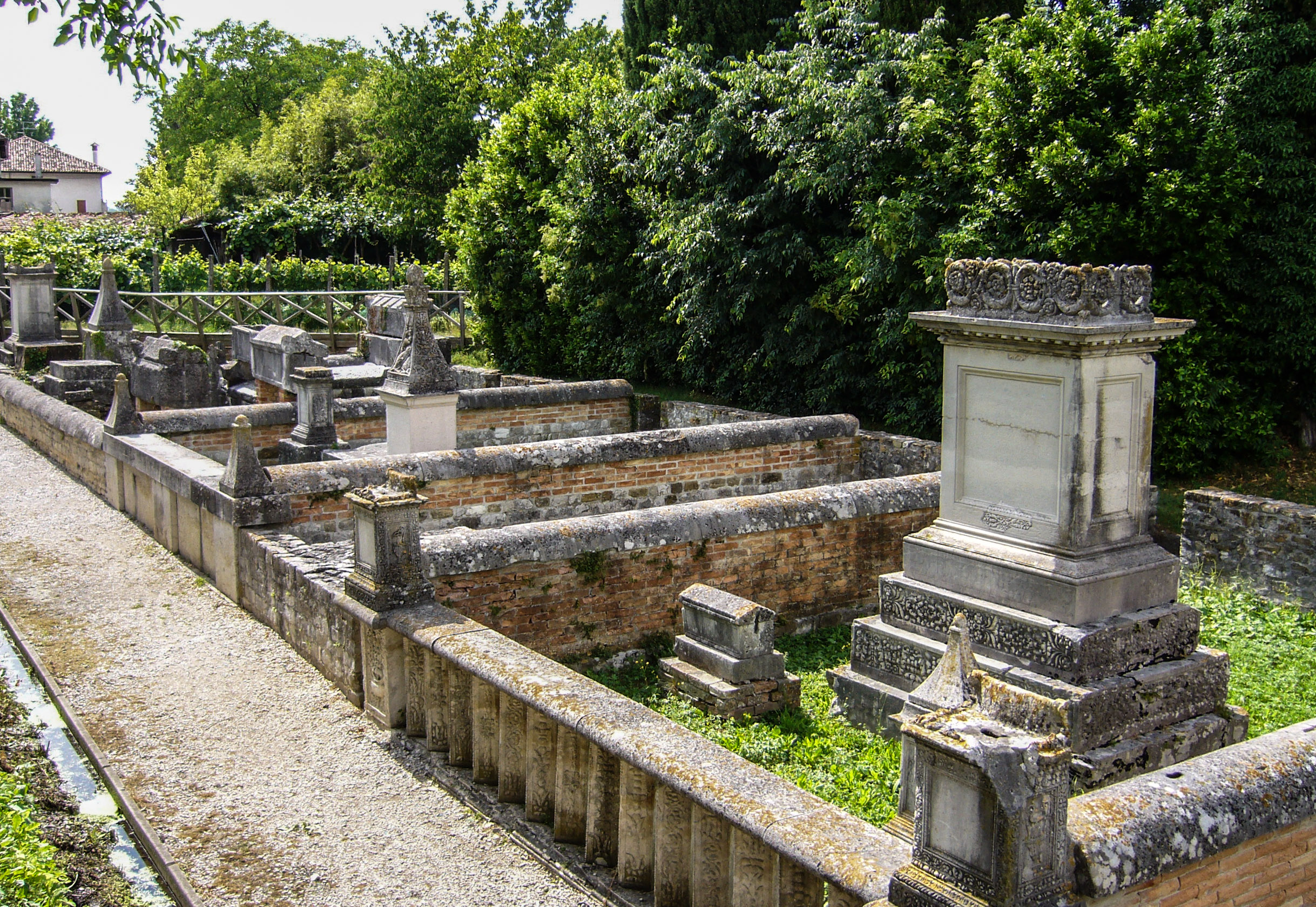
Roman burial ground (1)

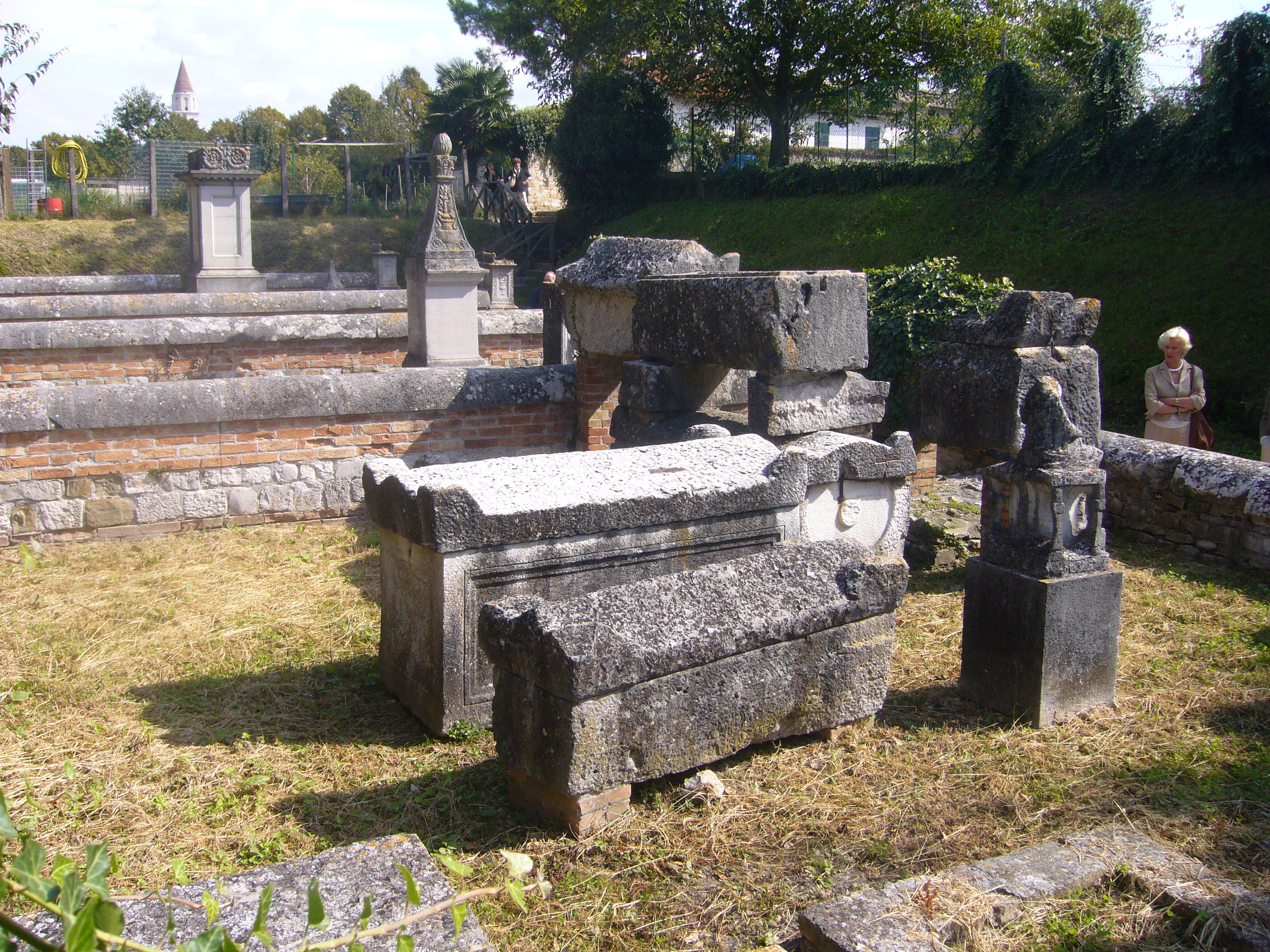
Roman burial ground (2)

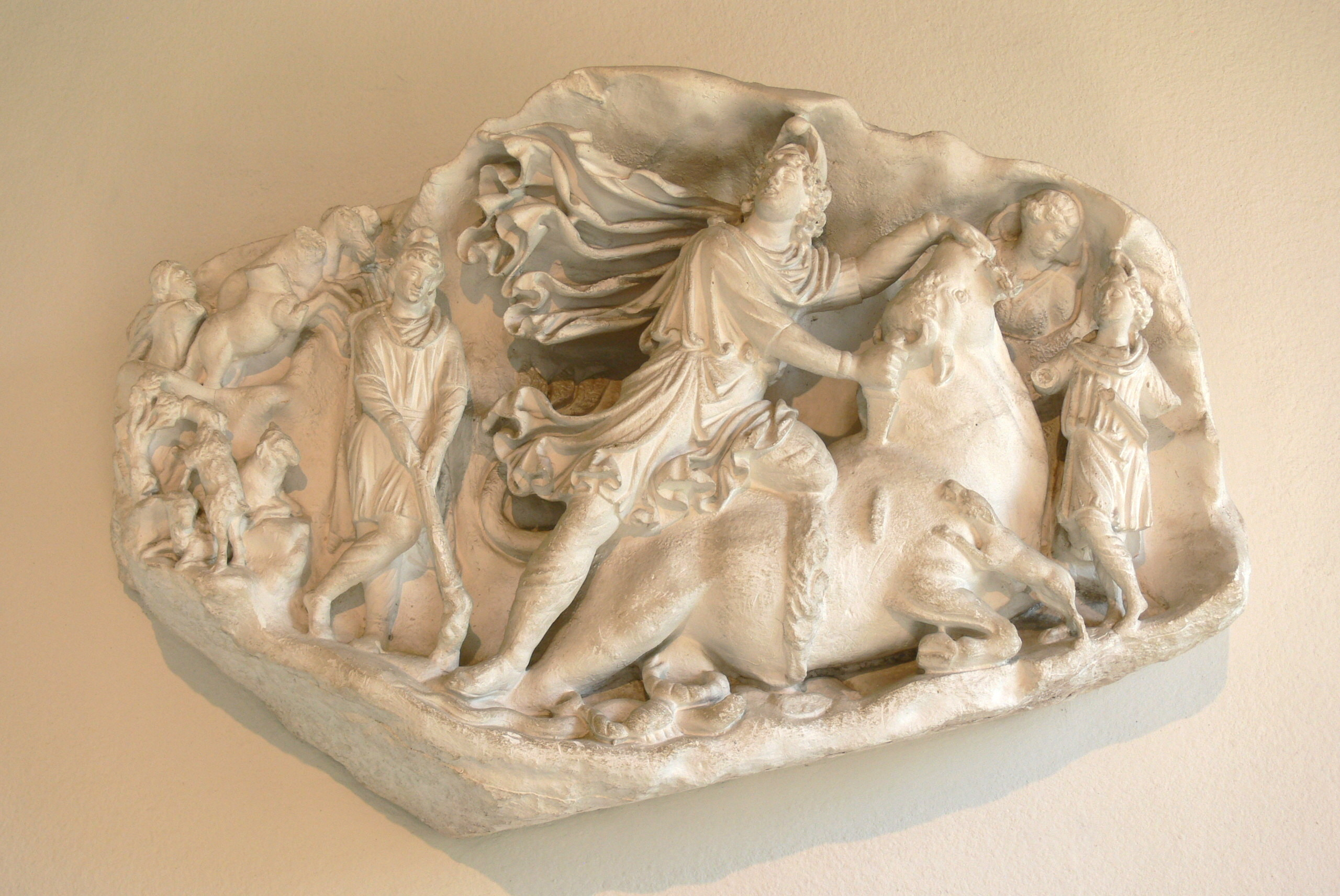
Sculptural relief of Mitra (Roman legionary cult), now preserved at the National Archaeological Museum in Aquileia.

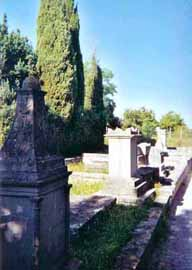
Paleo-Christian cemetery.

== Early imperial period (30 B.C.-285 A.D.) ==
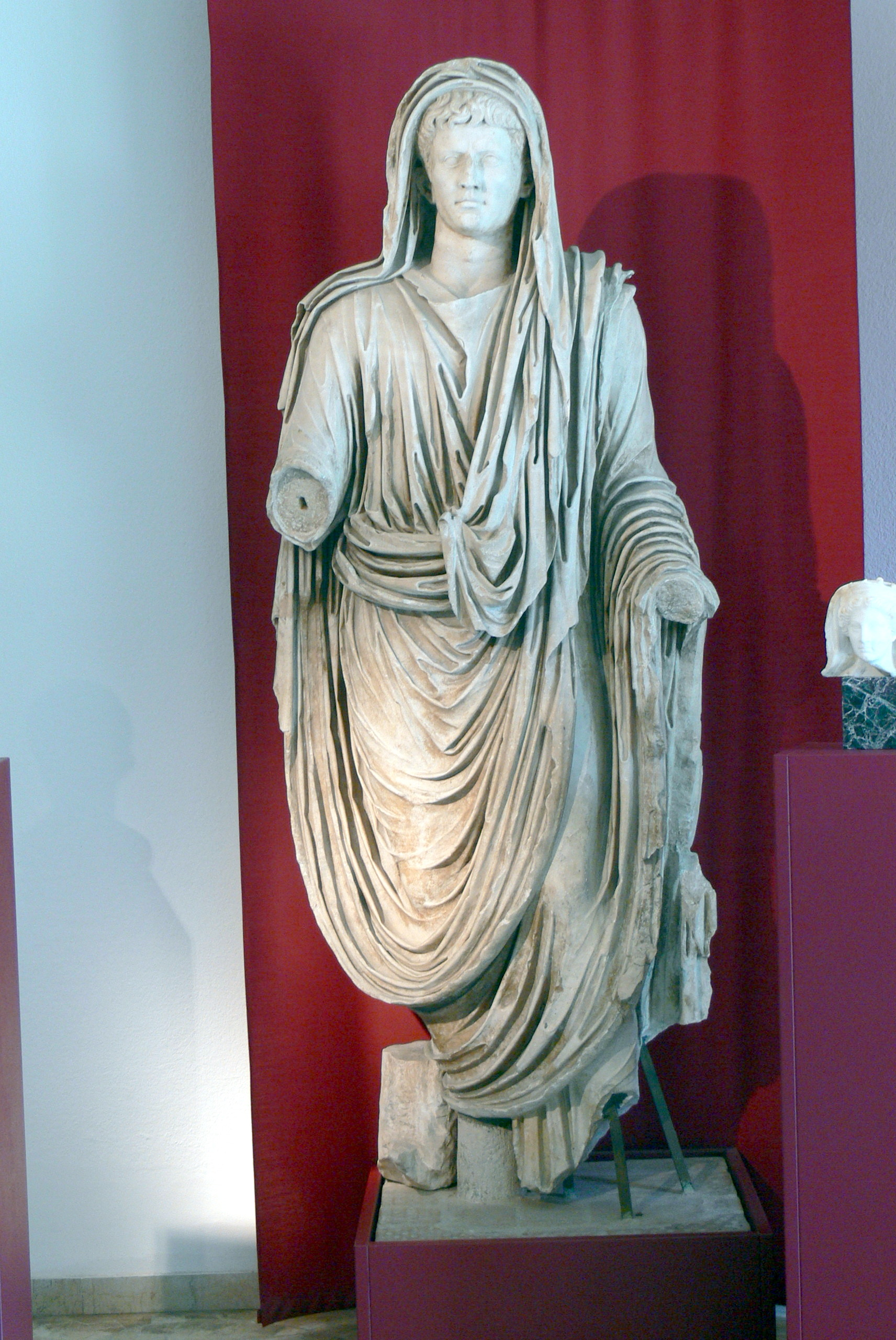
Statue of Augustus (who used Aquileia as his headquarters for military campaigns in the years 13-9 BC). (City Archaeological Museum).

At the time of Augustus, after an initial campaign led by Publius Sillius Nerva in 16 B.C. following an invasion of Pannonians in Istria and the subsequent Roman conquest of territories as far as Pula and Raša, in 15 B.C, his stepson Tiberius, together with his brother Drusus, led a military campaign against the populations of Rhaetians, settled between Noricum and Gaul, and Vindelici. The two, in an attempt to encircle the enemy by attacking him on two fronts without leaving him any escape routes, planned a large "pincer movement," which they put into practice also with the help of their lieutenants: Tiberius moved from Helvetia, while his younger brother moved from Aquileia and reached Tridentum, dividing the army into two columns. A first column traveled along the Adige and Isarco valleys (at whose confluence he built the Pons Drusi, near present-day Bolzano), ascending as far as the Inn; the second went along what was to become under Emperor Claudius the Via Claudia Augusta (traced therefore by his father Drusus) and which, through the Vinschgau valley and the Reschen pass, also reached the Inn river. Tiberius, advancing from the west, defeated the Vindelici, reuniting near Lake Constance with his brother Drusus, who, in the meantime, had defeated and subdued the peoples of the Breuni and Genauni. These successes enabled Augustus to subdue the peoples of the Alpine region as far as the Danube and earned him renewed imperatorial acclaim. A few years later, beginning in 14 B.C, Aquileia again turned out to be instrumental in the subjugation of the whole of Illyricum and Pannonia, under the commands first of Marcus Vinicius, then of Augustus' son-in-law and brotherly friend Agrippa, then of his stepson Tiberius. Aquileia again continued to be an important military center during the Dalmatian-Pannonian revolt of 6-9, forming the last bulwark against the possible threat of an invasion by these peoples, who could thus have reached Rome itself in only ten days. It was clear, however, that Aquileia had lost its former function as "headquarters," which was now attributed by Tiberius to Siscia on the Sava River, in a more advanced position. From this point on, Aquileia ceased to play a decisive military role any longer, maintaining instead an important economic and social function in the rear, now that all military forces had been moved to Pannonia and Dalmatia.

Drusus the Younger, son of Tiberius, most likely passed through Aquileia when he went to Pannonia to put down a revolt among the legions (in 14). More than fifty years later, in 69, the legions VII Claudia and VIII Augusta under the leadership of Marcus Antonius Primus, passed through this city. They had deployed and proclaimed Vespasian their emperor. Some have also speculated that the scenes on Trajan's Column No. 58-63 depict the forum of Aquileia, from where Trajan would have passed for the Dacian campaign of 105.

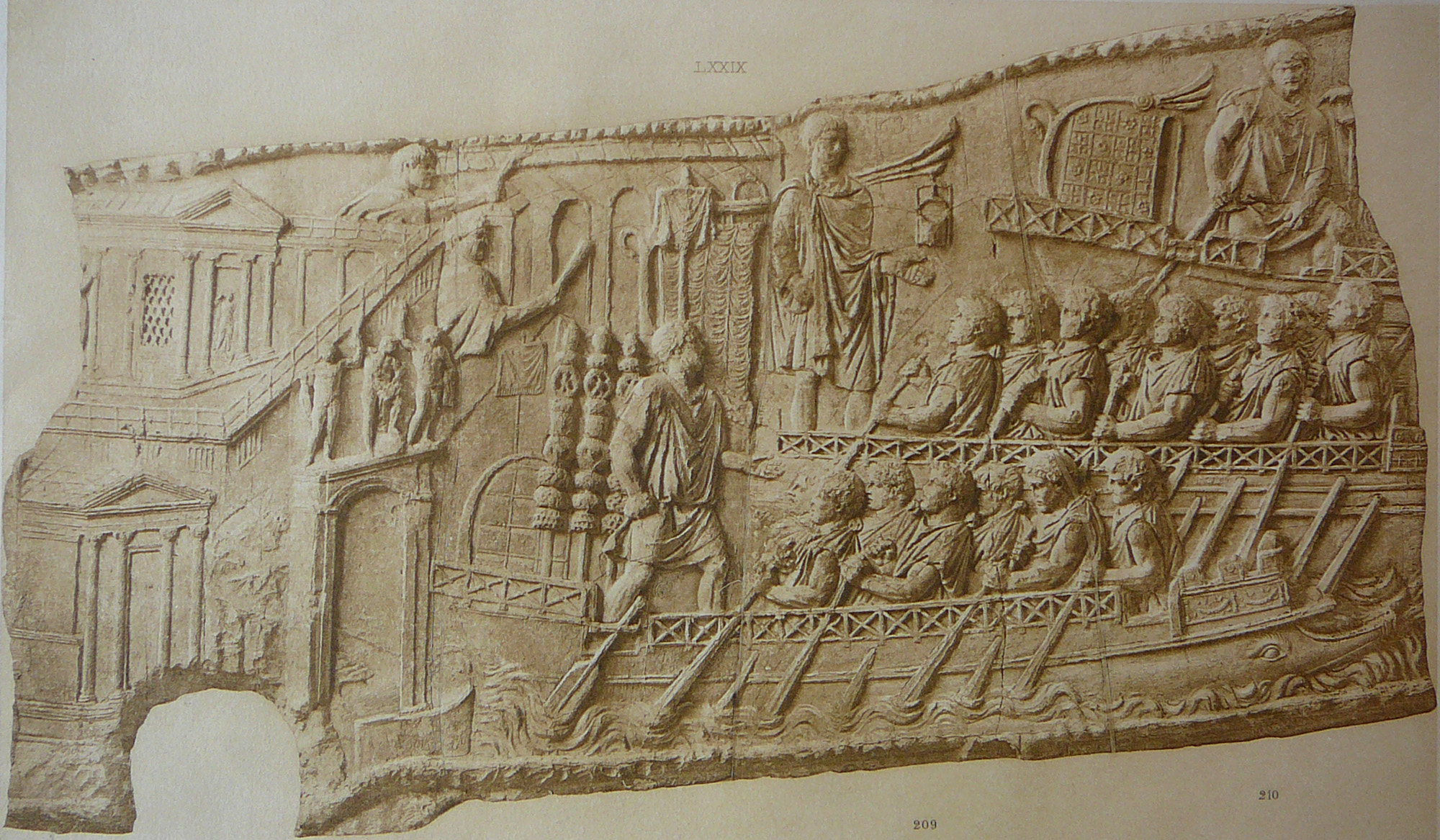
Trajan Column #58: classiarii sailing from the port of Brindisi (?).

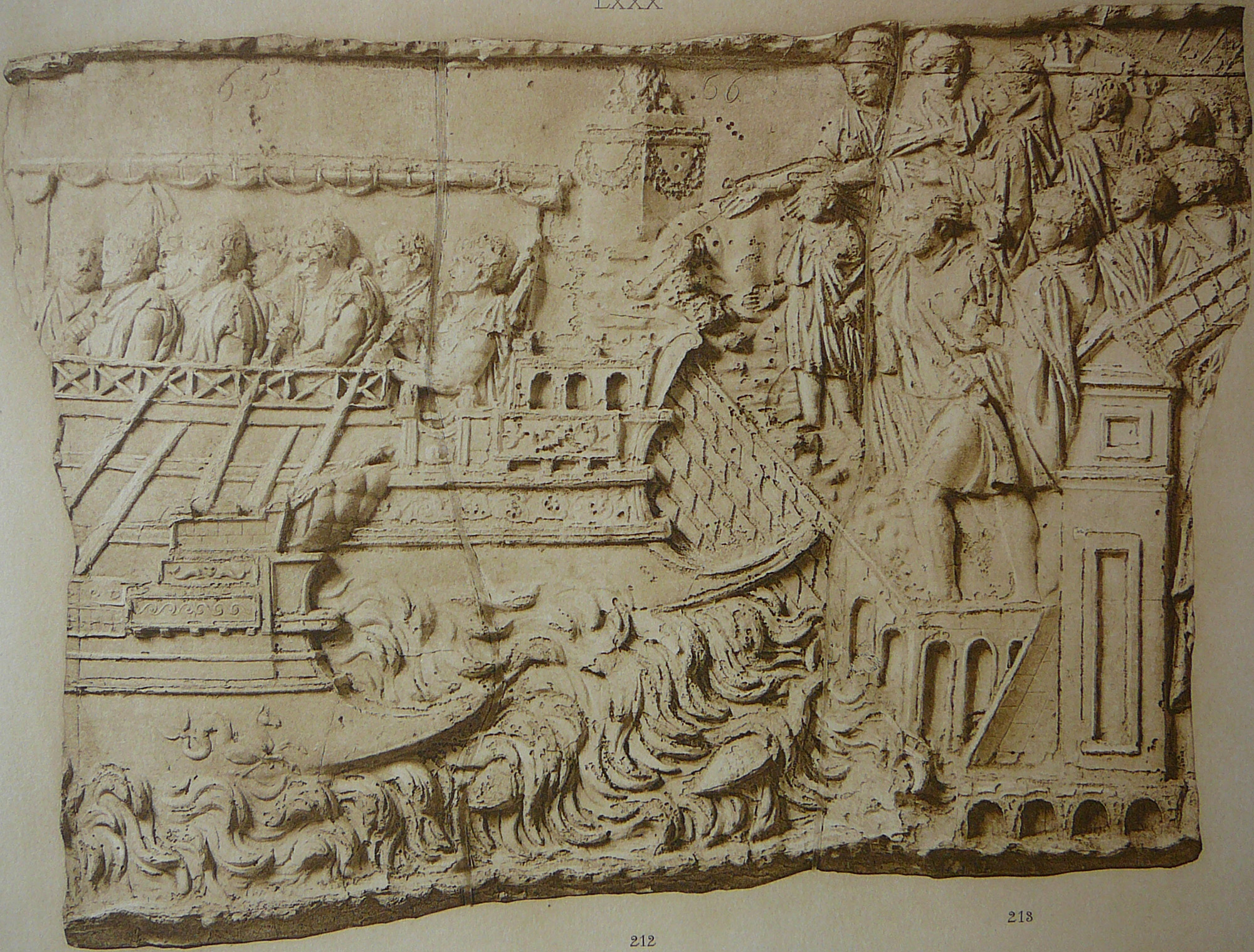
No. 59: Second port on the Italic-Adriatic coast.

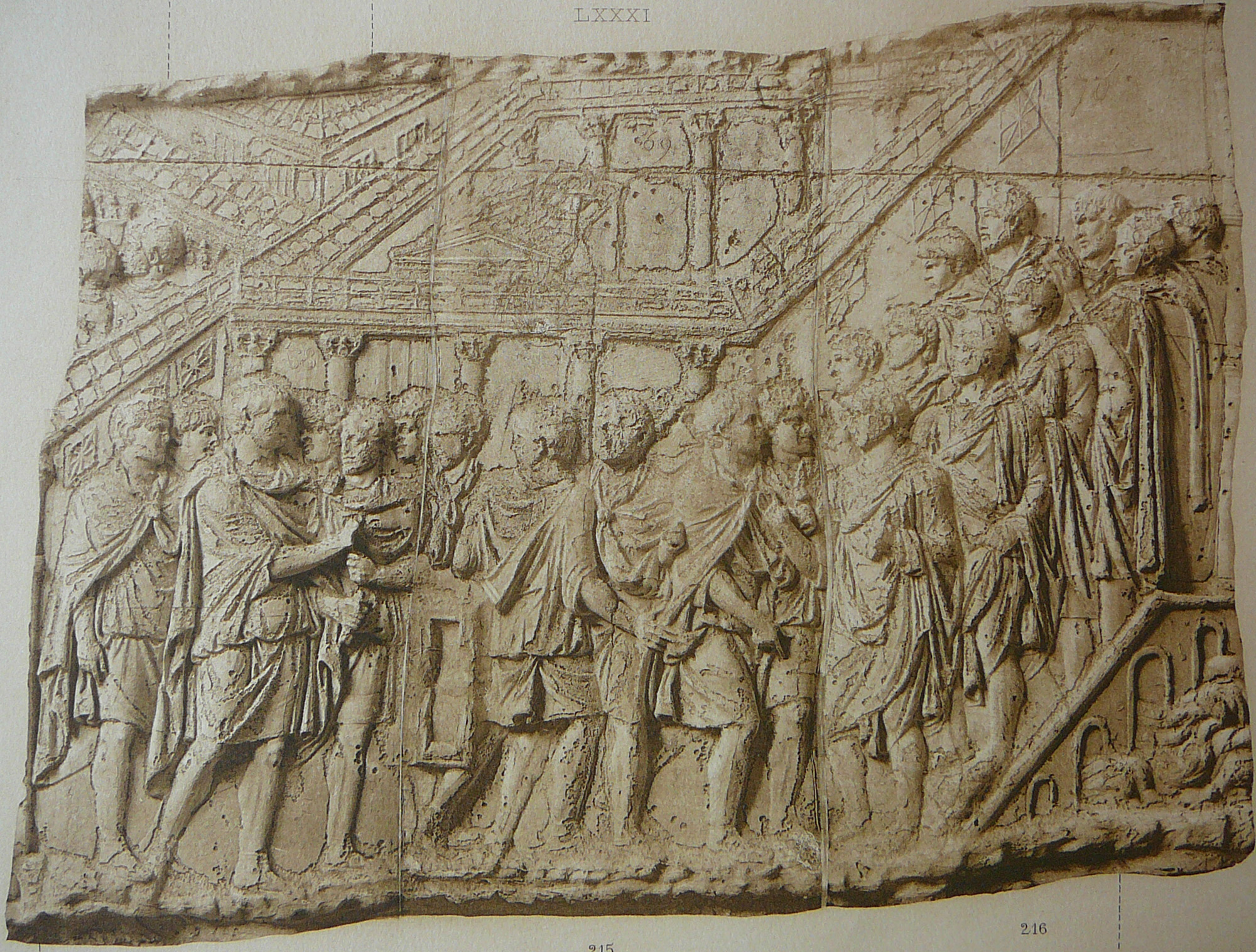
No. 60: The forum of the second Italic city.

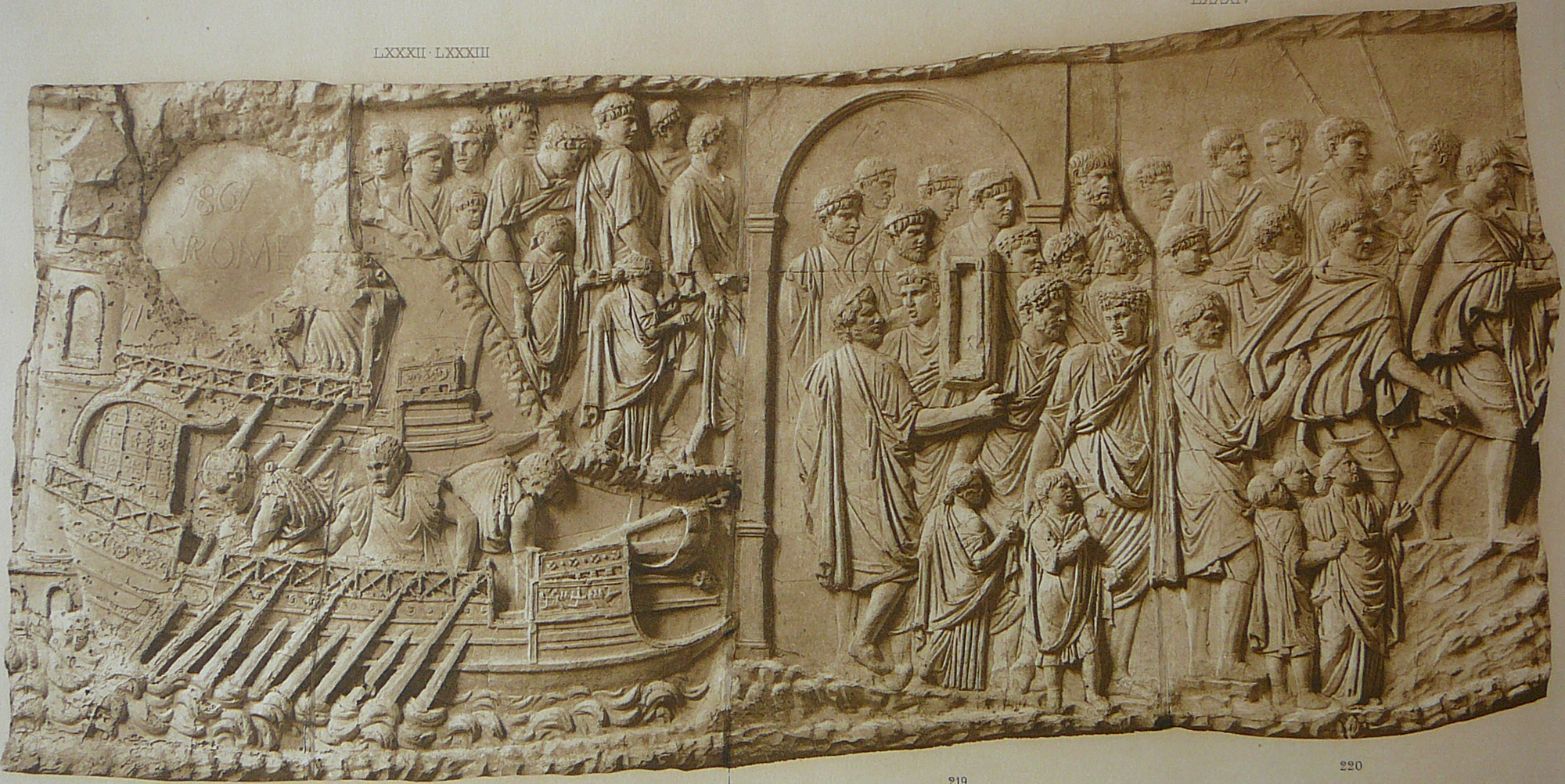
No. 61: The third stop is perhaps Ancona with its triumphal arch (?).

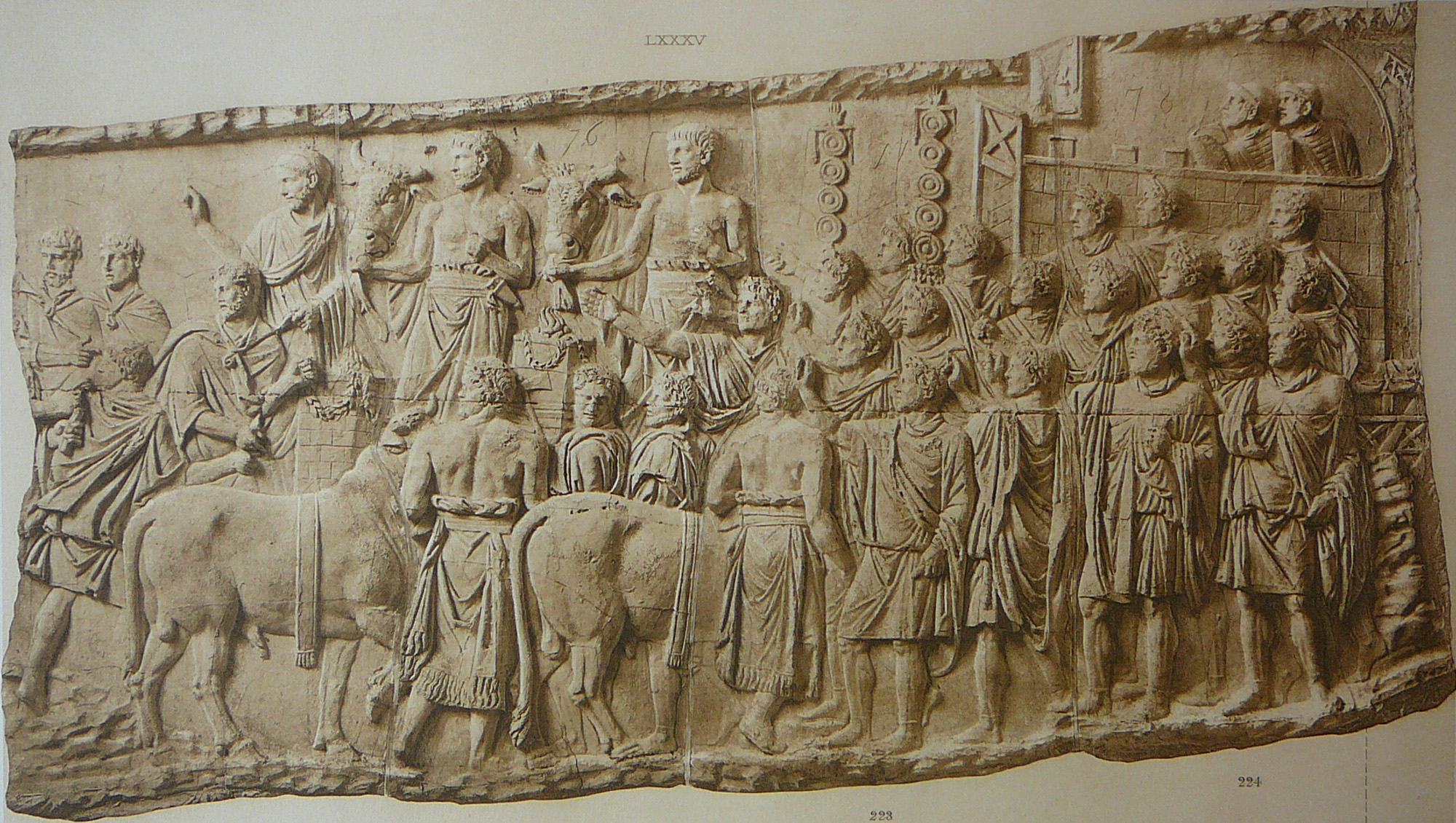
No. 62: Ancona again.

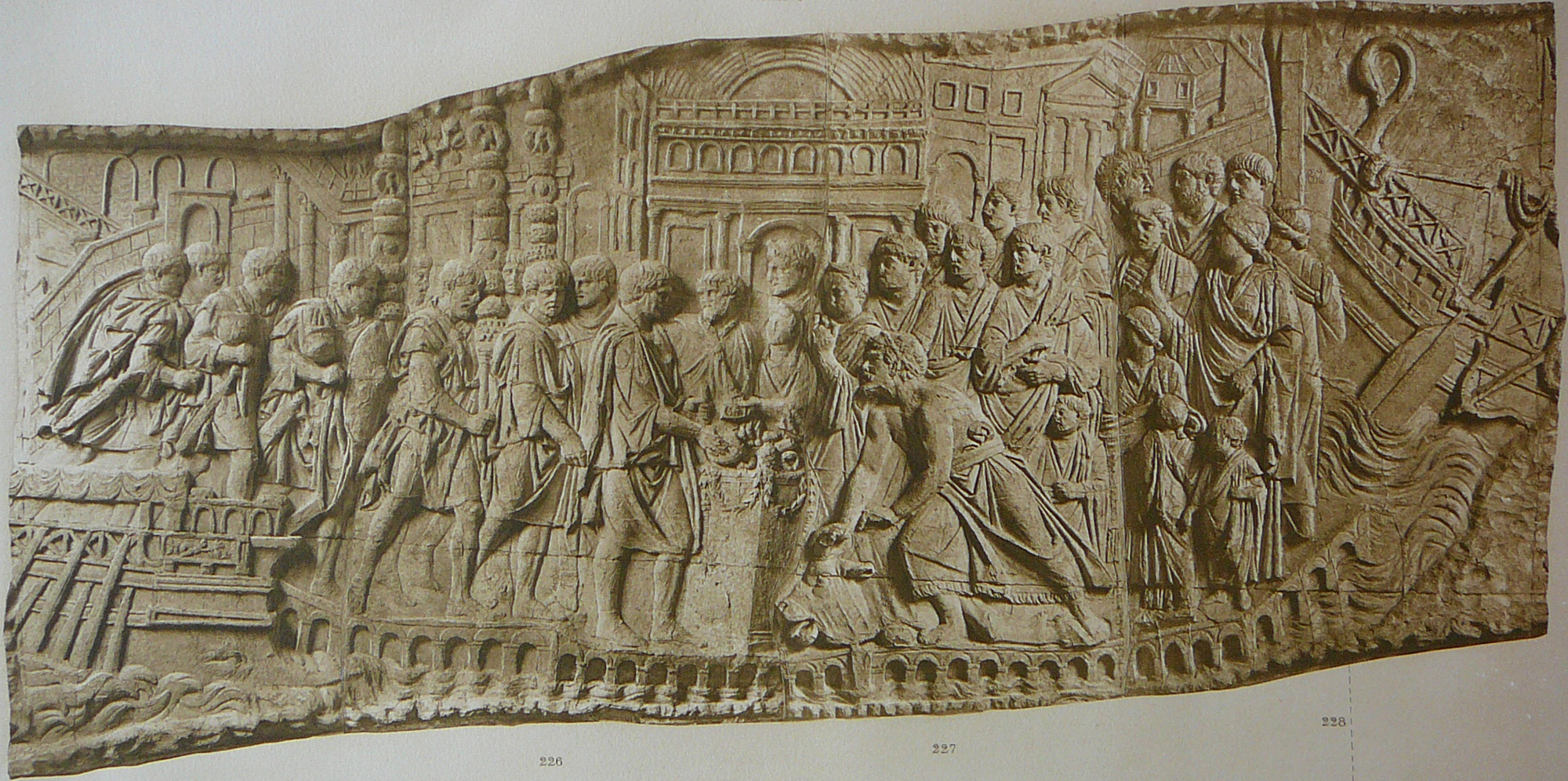
No. 63: Fourth stop, perhaps Aquileia (?). The march will continue to the Danube, following the Via Gemina to Singidunum.

The Empire between 165 and 189 (at the time of Marcus Aurelius and his son Commodus) was afflicted by a plague, probably a smallpox epidemic, known as the "Antonine plague", which lasted about 15 years and, according to certain sources, exterminated a large percentage of the imperial population (the figures, however, are debated among historians). According to some it was one of the events that profoundly changed Roman history, bringing about almost an epochal break with the previous period.

The city of Aquileia saw, from 168 to 170, immense numbers of troops amassing in its territory, and the fear that this mass gathering might drag along the dangerous disease soon proved well-founded. In the spring of 168 Emperor Marcus Aurelius and Lucius Verus decided to travel to the Danubian area to reach Carnuntum; Aquileia thus became the first stop, where the imperial general staff was composed of the prefect of the praetorium Titus Furius Victorinus, Pomponius Proculus Vitrasius Pollonius, Daturnius Tullus Priscus, Claudius Fronto, and Adventus Antistius. The two emperors arrived in Aquileia and worried about the epidemic, which meanwhile had already caused the death of the prefect Furius Victorinus, and sent a letter to Galen requesting him as personal physician for the Germanic campaign. By the end of the summer of that year Marcus Aurelius withdrew from the military campaign with his troops to winter in Aquileia. There he was joined by Galen just as the first cases of the plague broke out in the city. The increasing prevalence of plague cases in Aquileia led the emperors to decide to withdraw with only a personal escort to Rome; Lucius Verus, who had urged this departure because of his constant ill health, died shortly afterwards in Altinum, stricken with apoplexy (January 169). The city was finally besieged in 170 by a coalition of Germanic peoples from the territories north of the Danube, who reached northern Italy via the amber road. Opitergium, at that time devoid of walls, was destroyed, but not Aquileia, which still had walls.

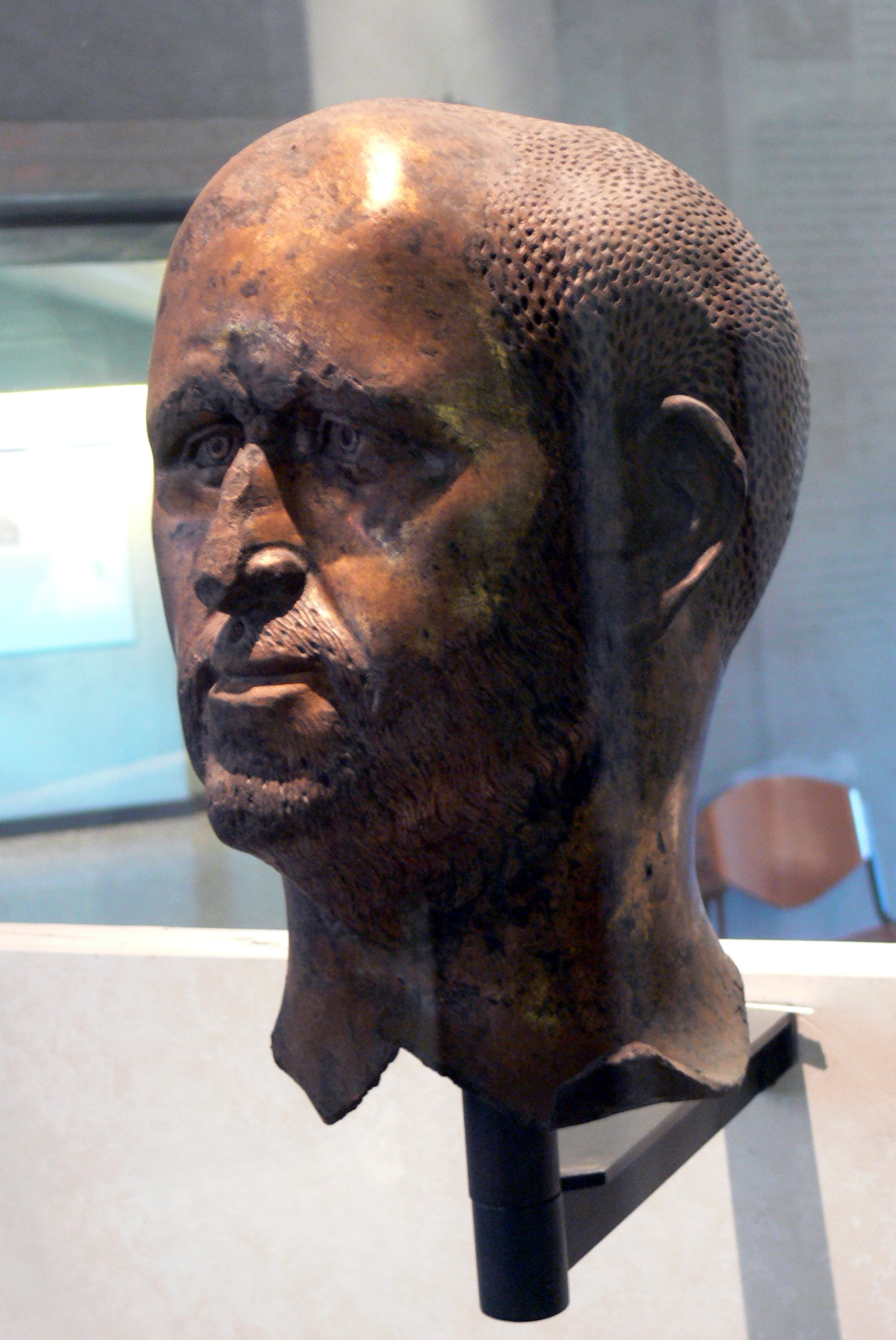
Bronze bust possibly of Maximinus Thrax, who died near the city of Aquileia (City Archaeological Museum).

The defensive structures, strengthened between the 2nd and 3rd centuries, enabled it to overcome the sieges of the Quadi and the Marcomanni (170), and of the emperor Maximinus Thrax, who, following the election at his expense by the Roman Senate of the emperors Pupienus and Balbinus, who accepted Gordian III as Caesar, descended to Italy from Pannonia with his army (in 238). When Maximinus' army came in sight of Aquileia, located at the crossroads of important communication routes and a storehouse for the food and equipment needed by the soldiers, the city closed its gates to the emperor, led by two senators appointed by the Senate, Rutilius Pudens Crispinus and Tullius Menophilus. Maximinus then made a fateful decision: instead of descending quickly on the capital with a contingent, he marched on Emona, which he occupied, and personally laid siege to the city of Aquileia, allowing his opponents to organize: Pupienus reached Ravenna, from where he directed the defense of the besieged city.

Although the balance of forces was still in Maximinus' advantage, the prolonged siege, food shortages and the strict discipline imposed by the emperor caused him to be met with hostility by his troops. Soldiers of Legio II Parthica tore his images from his military insignia to signal his deposition, then assassinated him in his camp, along with his son Maximus and his ministers (May 10, 238).

Their heads, cut off and placed on poles, were carried to Rome by messengers on horseback, while the bodies of father and son were mutilated and fed to dogs, a poena post mortem. The Senate elected 13-year-old Gordian III emperor and ordered damnatio memoriae for Maximinus.

In 259-260, during the time of Emperor Gallienus, a new Germanic incursion (possibly by Marcomanni), reached Ravenna before being stopped, just as Emperor Valerian was engaged on the eastern front against the Sasanids of Shapur I. The horde of barbarians once again passed near Aquileia. A decade later (in 270), Claudius Gothicus, shortly before his death from the plague, had left a garrison of troops in Aquileia under the command of his brother Quintillus, on whom the Senate conferred the imperial office once news of his brother's demise had been received. Upon learning of Claudius's death and the appointment of Quintillus, Aurelian quickly ended the war against the Goths in Thracia and the Moesias, ending the sieges of Anchialus, near modern Pomorie in Bulgaria on the Black Sea, and Nicopolis ad Istrum, to rush to Sirmium, where he was acclaimed emperor: upon this news Quintillus, who had remained in Aquileia, abandoned by his own soldiers, preferred to commit suicide. Aurelian then died in 275, and it is reported that once Marcus Claudius Tacitus was elected new emperor, the Senate of Rome sent news to the most important cities throughout the Empire. Among them was Aquiliea, as well as Mediolanum, Antioch, Thessalonica, Athens, Corinth, and Alexandria.

=== Archaeology of early imperial Aquileia ===
Beginning in 15 B.C. following the conquest of the eastern Alpine region, construction of the Via Claudia Augusta was begun, linking Venetia to the banks of the Danube in Noricum (roughly present-day Bavaria) via the Brenner or Reschen Pass. It was built by Drusus the Elder, stepson and general of Emperor Augustus; later expanded and completed by his son and emperor Claudius in 47 AD. This road connected the Latin world with the Germanic world, and other important Roman arterial roads converged on it: this was the case with the Via Annia (which joined Adria to Aquileia), the Via Popilia (which connected Altino and Rimini), the Via Aurelia (between Padua and Feltre via Asolo) and the Via Postumia (the consular road from Genoa to Aquileia). In later years (around 14 B.C.) the Via Gemina was also begun, connecting Aquileia with Emona, following the first section of the amber road. This road seems to have been built by the Legio XIII Gemina, which was located near the city of Venetia et Histria during these years.

From the middle of the first century AD the city began to be provided with stone structures along the river port east of the city (previously the structures were wooden), made from an artificial widening of the Natissa, and the associated port facilities, still made of wood; towards the end of the century, the port was rebuilt in stone.

Both the present location and the structure of Aquileia's Roman forum date to the late 2nd-early 3rd century. The measurements appear to have been 115 meters x 57 meters, according to a 1934 study by Giovanni Battista Brusin. The continued expansion of the city led to the construction of new and imposing walls in the southern and western parts, first in the time of Maximinus Thrax, then of Flavius Claudius Julianus and Theodosius I.

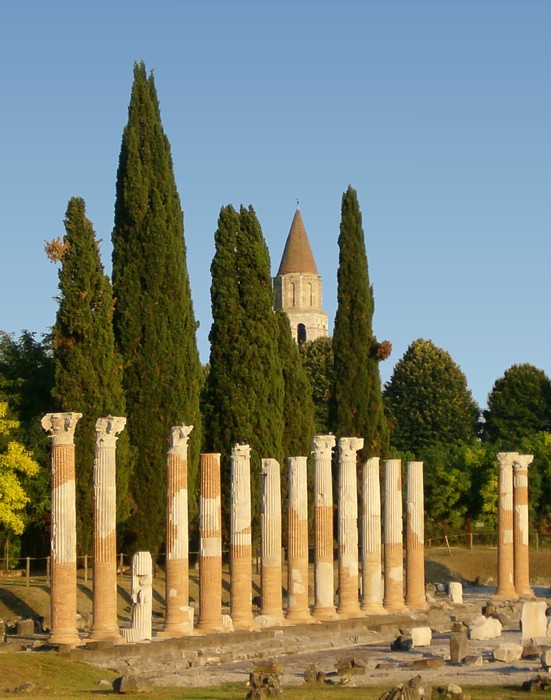
The Roman Forum (1)

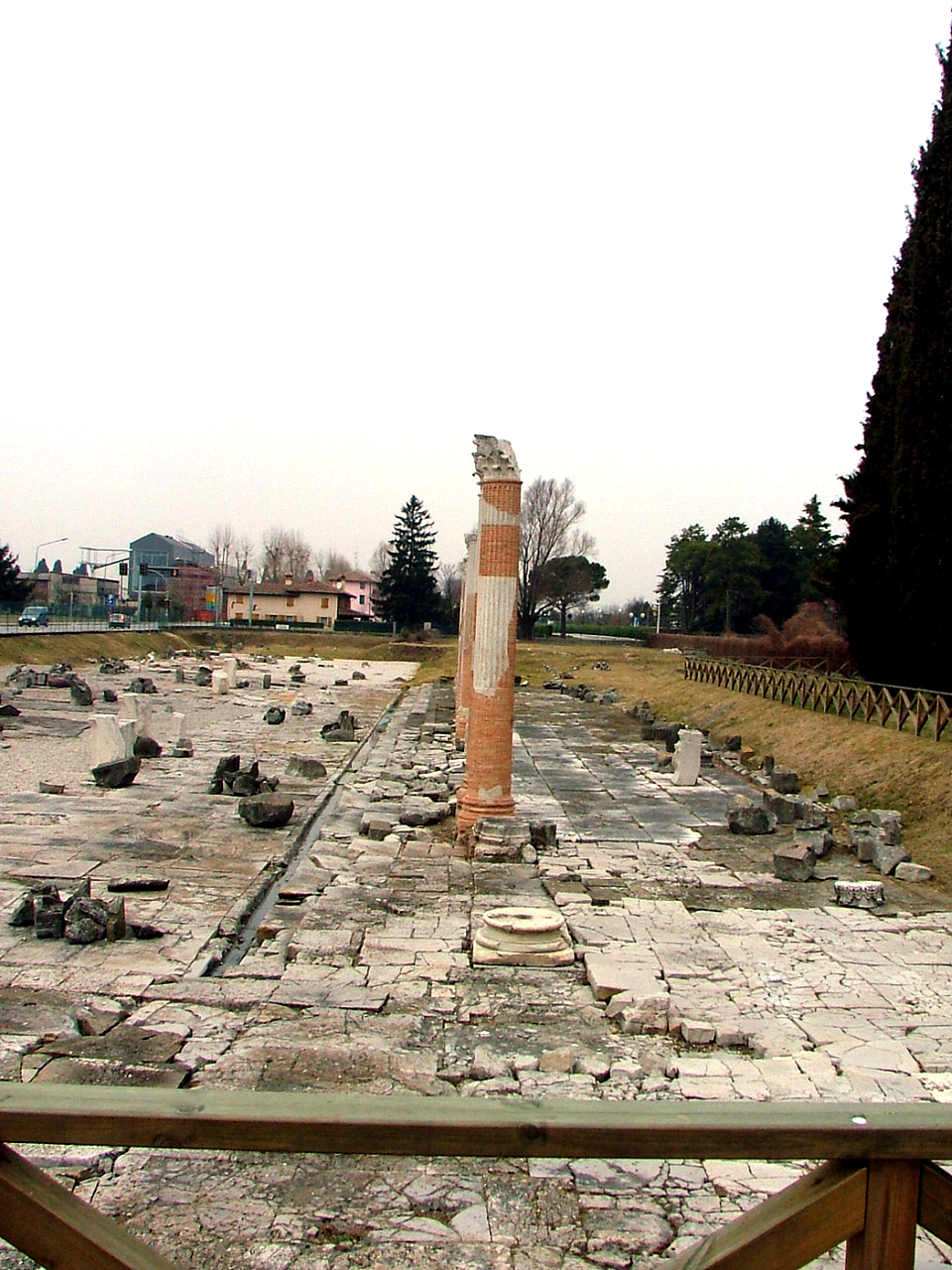
The Roman Forum (2)

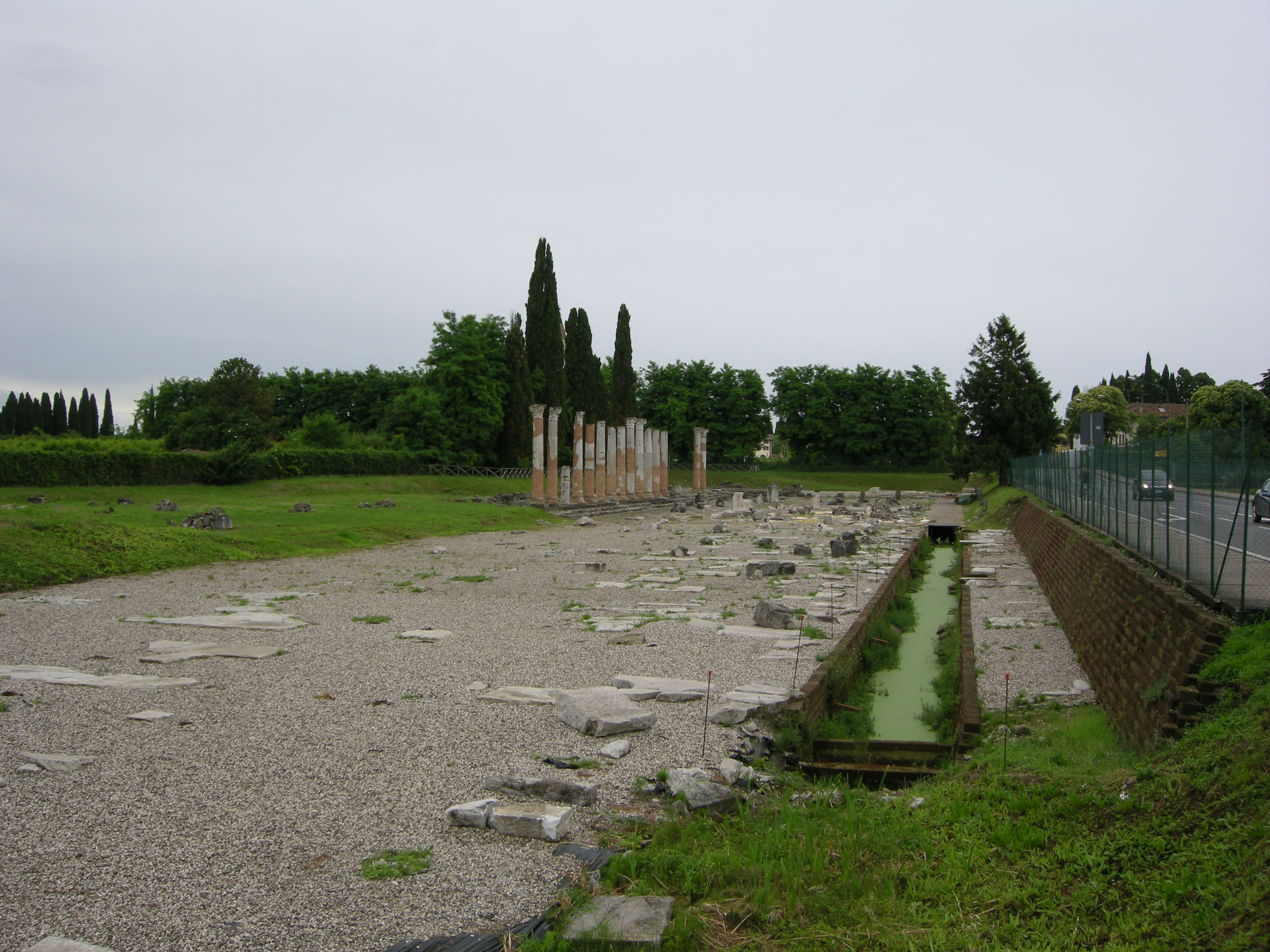
The Roman Forum (3)

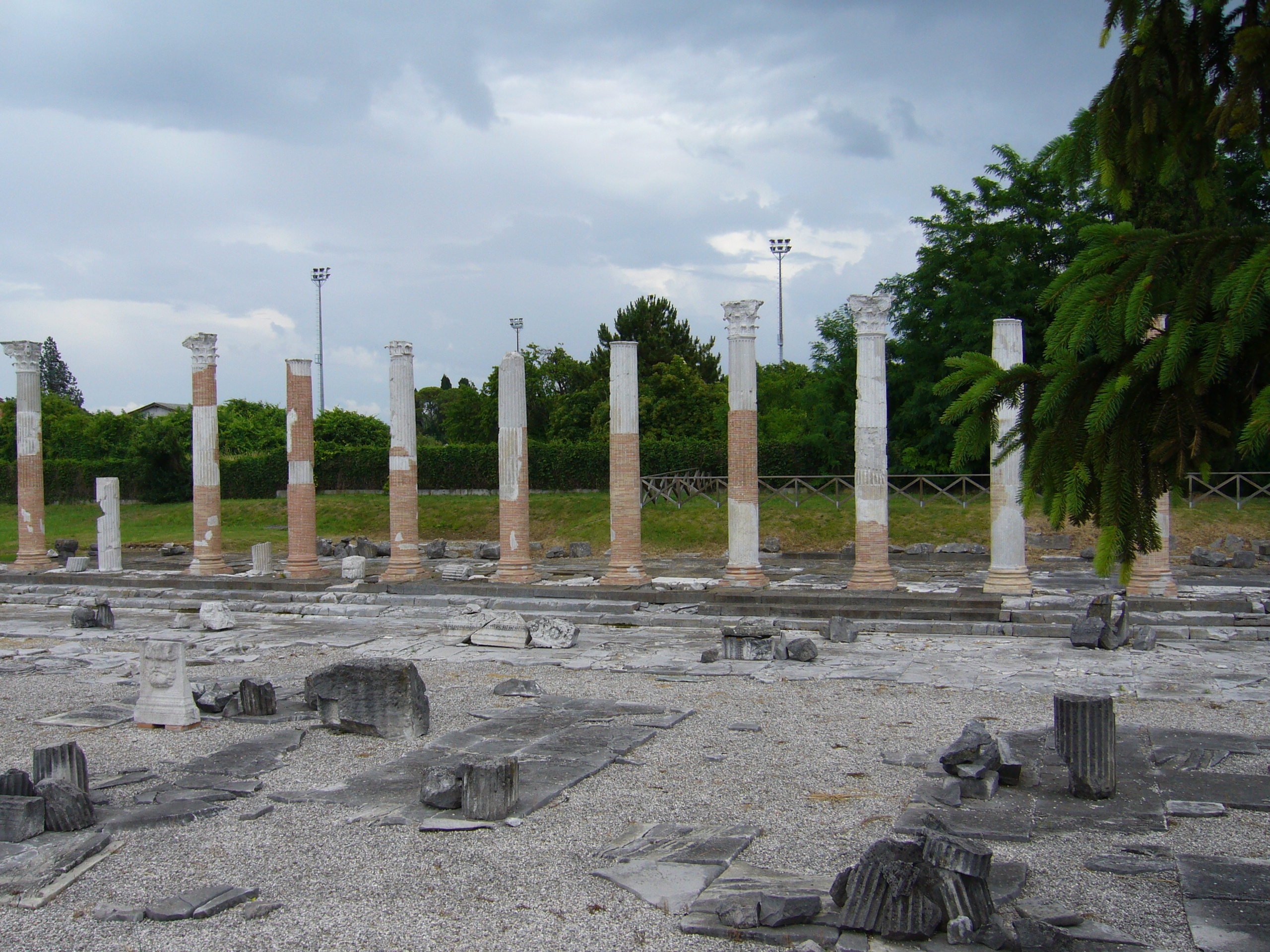
The Roman Forum (4)

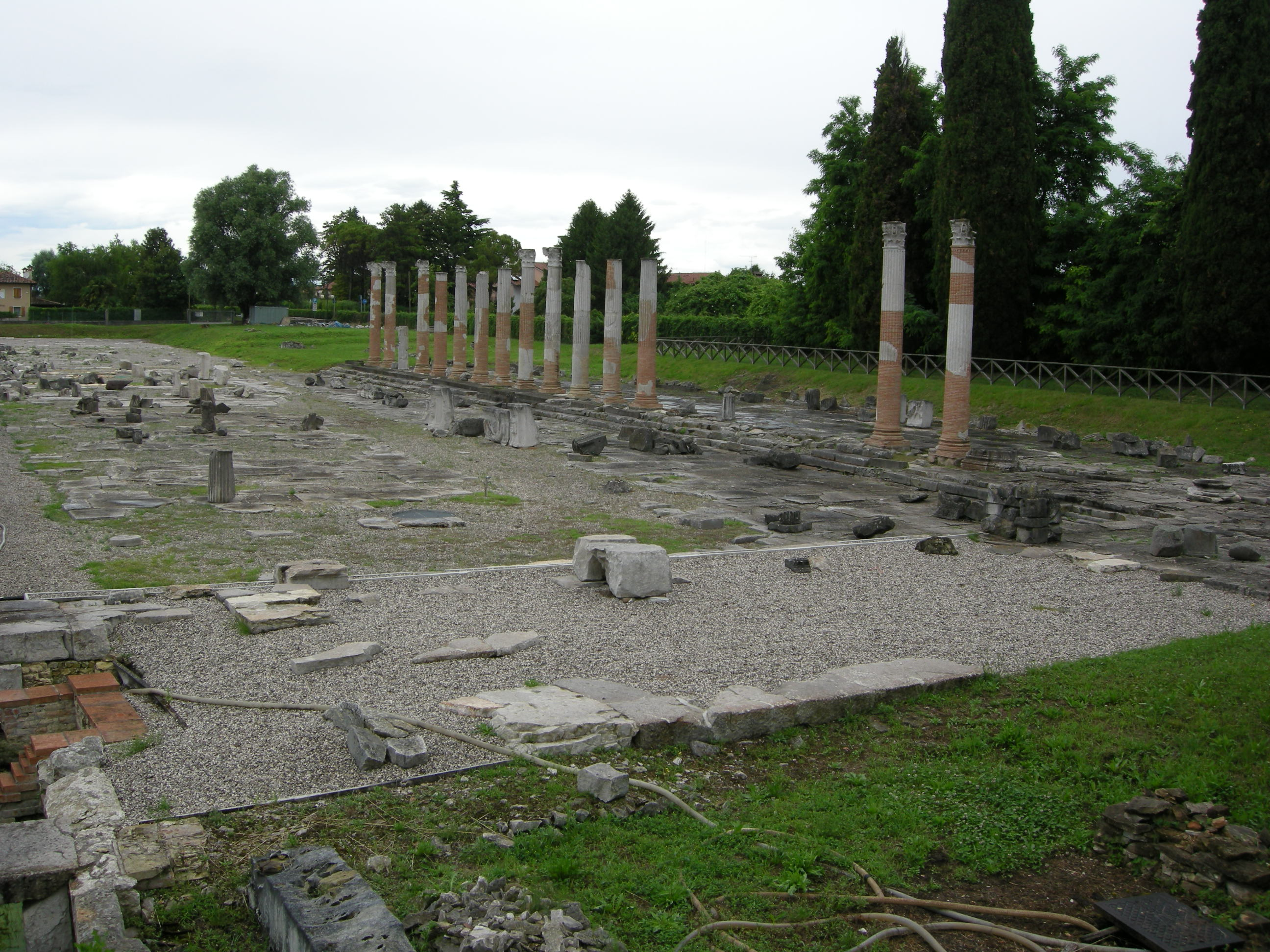
The Roman Forum (5)

== Late imperial period (286-452) ==
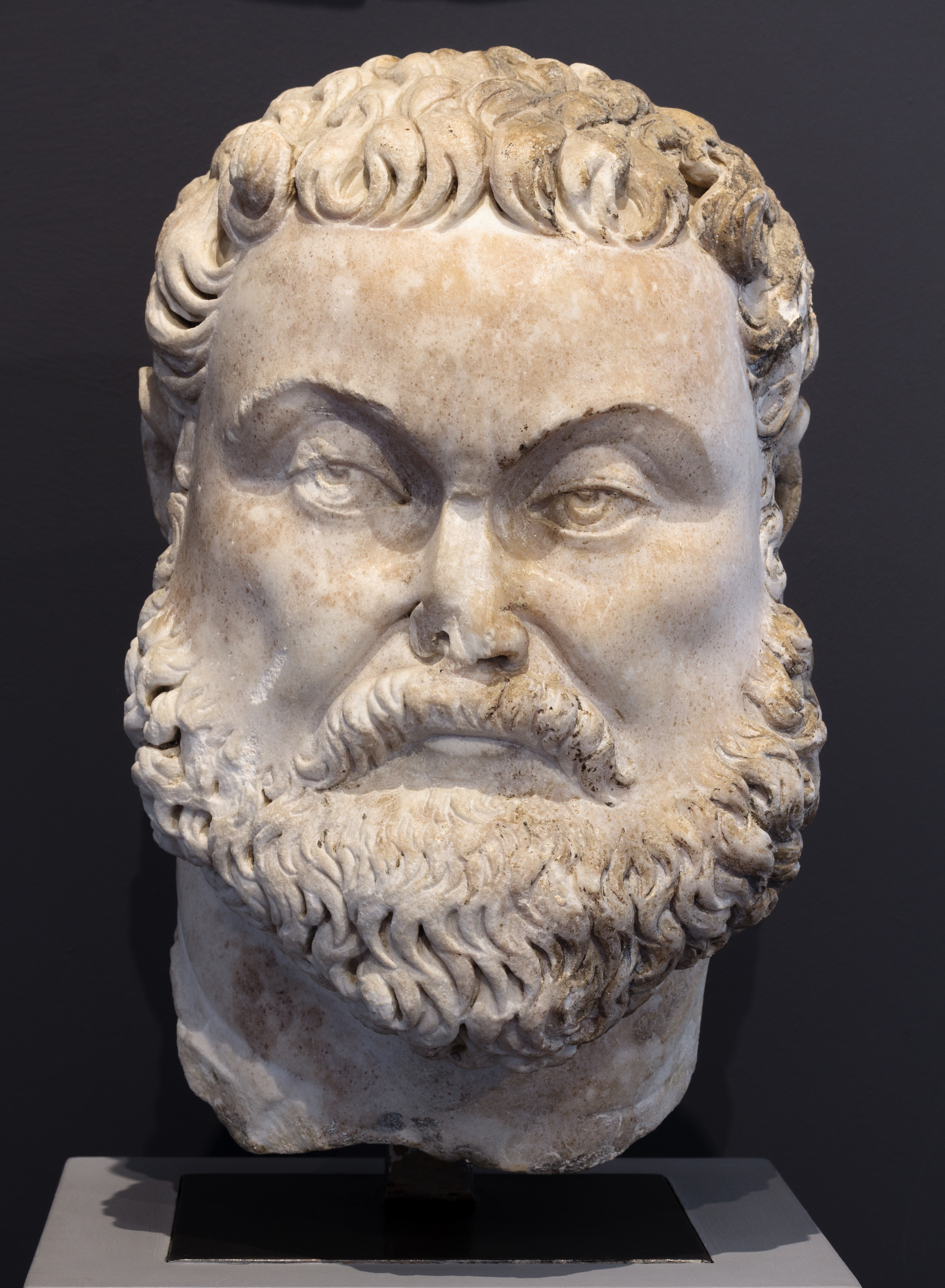
Portrait of Maximian (Saint-Raymond Museum, Toulouse.

Maximian, once he became Augustus of the West, preferred to use two capitals: Aquileia (which Ausonius calls the ninth city of the Empire), farther east, as a river-sea port on the Adriatic Sea and a military hinterland, given its proximity to the limes of the Claustra Alpium Iuliarum; Mediolanum, on the other hand, farther west, was positioned to guard the passes north of the great Alpine lakes. In these two locations he therefore had large imperial structures and palaces erected, leaving mainly the care of the defense of the Rhine limes to Constantius.

In 312, during the civil war, Constantine I, now suspicious of Maxentius, assembled a large army and moved across the Alps into Italy, and after defeating Maxentius's armies twice in a row, near Turin and Brescia, laid siege to and occupied, first Verona and then Aquileia, subduing the whole of northern Italy. Shortly thereafter he marched on Rome, where he finally defeated Maxentius' army just north of the Eternal City in the decisive Battle of the Milvian Bridge, on October 28, 312. With the death of Maxentius, all of Italy came under Constantine's control, while the Praetorian Guard and the Castra Praetoria were suppressed.

Throughout the continuation of the fourth century, imperial presences in Aquileia intensified, and many bloody clashes resolved fratricidal contentions such as the one between Constantine II and Constans I in 340; or between Constantius II and Magnentius in 351-352; or episodes of usurpation: Theodosius I defeated Magnus Maximus there (in 388); Valentinian III killed Joannes there in the Hippodrome (in 425).

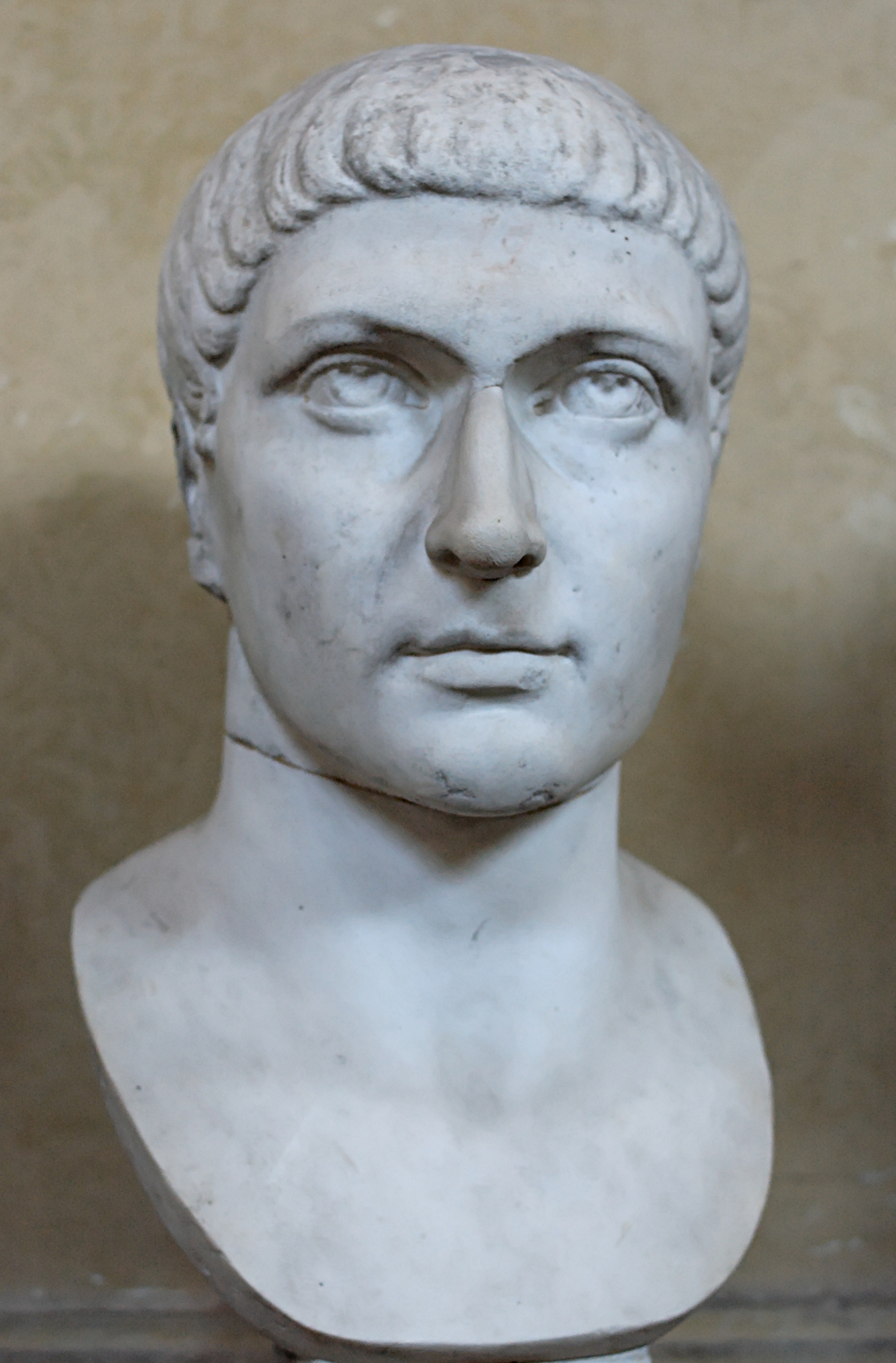
Portrait of Constantine I (Chiaramonti Museum).

Aquileia exercised, moreover, a new moral and cultural function with the advent of Christianity, which, according to tradition, was preached by the apostle St. Mark, and whose development was based on a series of bishops, deacons and presbyters who suffered martyrdom. The first were Hermagoras and Fortunatus (ca. 70 AD). A native of Aquileia is supposed to have been Pope Pius I (d. 154). Other martyrs of the Aquileian church were, in the 3rd century, Hilarius and Tatianus (d. 284). At the beginning of the 4th century, Chrysogonus, Proto and the brothers Cantius, Cantianus and Cantianilla were martyred, the cult of whom found wide diffusion throughout the territories of the Diocese of Aquileia, from Veneto to Istria, and from Carinthia to Slovenia. In 313 Emperor Constantine ended the persecutions. Under Bishop Theodore (c. 319 m.) a large center for worship arose consisting of three beautifully mosaicated halls, each accommodating more than 2,000 worshippers.

Between 317 and 323, when Licinius had to cede Illyricum to Constantine I, Constantine strengthened the fleets on the Adriatic and Aegean seas, strengthening the seaports of Aquileia, Piraeus, and Thessalonica (former capital of Galerius), with the construction of arsenals, shipyards, as well as improving the armament of naval squadrons.

In 340 Constantine II waited for his brother Constans I to go to a province that was loyal to Constantine himself and descended to Italy with an army, under the pretext of heading to the eastern front (January–February); Constans, who was in Dacia at the time, learned of his brother's intentions and sent a force against him that could slow him down before the young augustus arrived with the rest of the army. Constans' generals feigned an attack on Aquileia and then retreated and laid a series of ambushes for Constantine who was pursuing them; on the occasion of one of these, near Cervenianum in early April, they surrounded Constantine's men, killing many of them, including Constantine himself, whose body was thrown into the river Alsa. In 345 Constans spent a few months in the city, meeting with Athanasius of Alexandria. A few years later, Constantius II spent the winter of 351/352 in Sirmium, then resumed his campaign by driving Magnentius out of Aquileia and forcing him back to Gaul. In 361 Flavius Claudius Julianus sent the garrison of Sirmium to Gaul, but along the way, stopping at Aquileia, it rebelled, besieged by Jovian forces. Instead, Julian continued on to the East, along with Nevitta's army, to Naissus in Moesia, and thence to Thrace, ready for a clash with Constantius II.

The bishops of Aquileia grew in importance in the following centuries, making a vigorous contribution to the development of Western Christianity, both doctrinally (famous and decisive for the struggle against Arianism was the council of 381, which affected all the Western churches) and in terms of the authority exercised (it was a metropolis for some twenty dioceses in Italy and a dozen beyond the Alps). A few years later, in 387, Magnus Maximus, thinking of deposing Valentinian II, crossed the Alps and came to threaten Aquileia; while the following year (in 388), Theodosius I waged war against Magnus Maximus, who was defeated first at Siscia (today Sisak), then at the Battle of the Save at Poetovio (today Ptuj in Slovenia), and finally at Aquileia.

Aquileia was besieged and occupied during Alaric's repeated raids in 401 and 408. It is reported that about fifteen years later, Valentinian III, after being betrothed to Theodosius I's daughter Licinia Eudoxia, was sent to the West with a strong army, under the command of the magister militum Ardabur and his son Aspar, and under the guardianship of his mother Placidia, who acted as regent for her five-year-old son; while en route, in Thessalonica, he was appointed as caesar by Helion, on October 23, 424. After wintering in Aquileia, the Roman army of the East moved toward Ravenna, where John was located; the city fell after a four-month siege, due to the betrayal of the garrison, and John was captured, deposed and killed (June or July 425).

Aquileia finally did not resist to Attila who as a result of the incidental collapse of a wall of the fortification managed to penetrate the city devastating it (July 18, 452) and, by spreading salt on the ruins, took it by forcing the legionaries he had taken prisoners to build siege machines in use by the Romans and massacred or enslaved much of the population. Two legends are linked to the figure of Attila: one inherent to the collapse of the walls of Aquileia and a premonitory dream by which Attila conquered the city; the other about the treasure of Aquileia, buried to prevent it from being plundered. From this time on, Aquileia ceased to be a stronghold protecting northern Italy in its eastern part, thus being replaced by Verona on the Adige River.

=== Archaeology of late imperial Aquileia ===
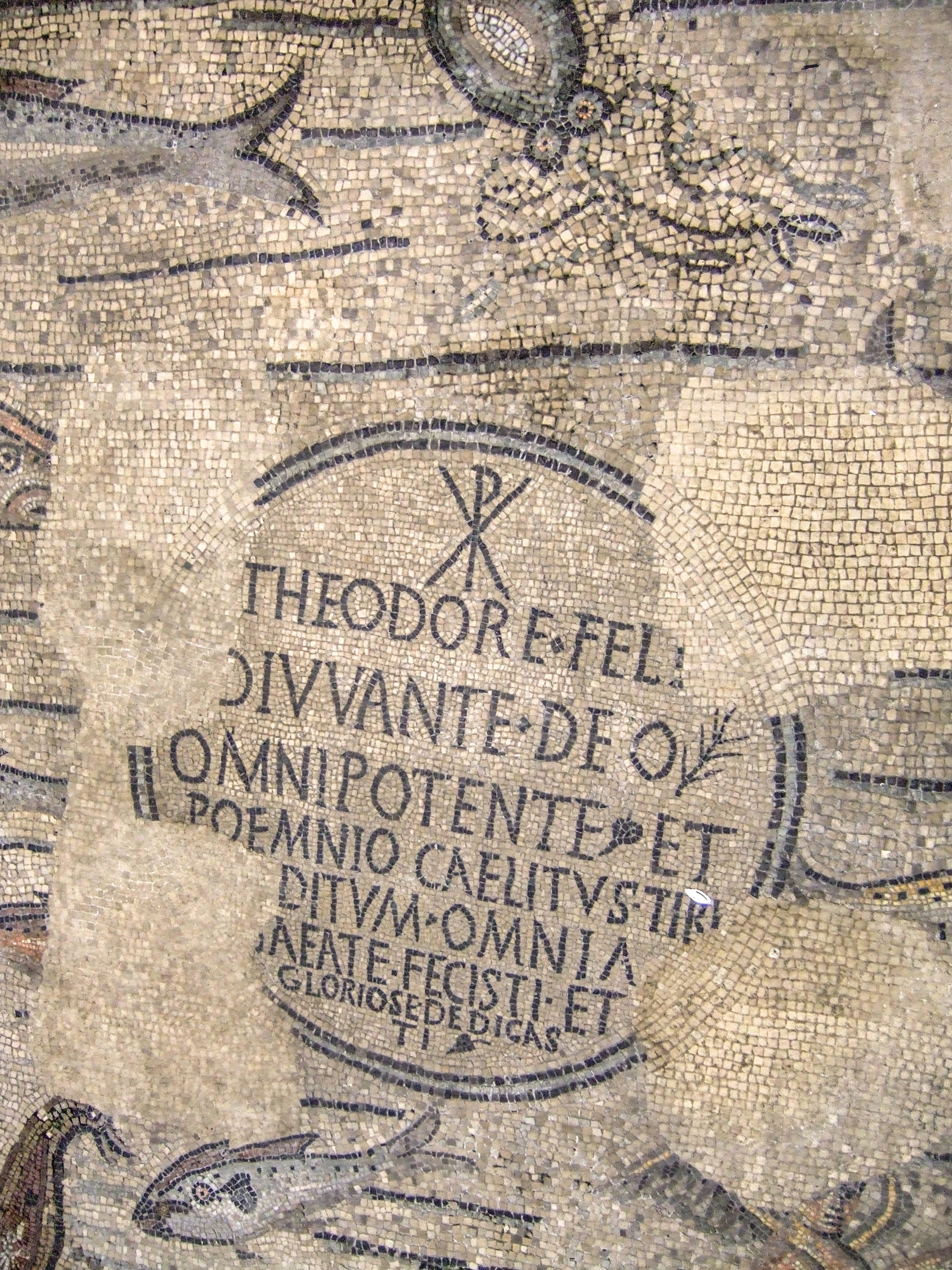
Mosaic with dedication to Bishop Theodore

Despite the Crisis of the 3rd century, Diocletian founded the mint of Aquileia, and the city, due to its many authoritative offices and institutions, still turned out to be, at the death of Emperor Theodosius I (395), an important city in the Empire. At the time of the tetrarchy Aquileia became one of the capitals of the Roman Empire and was endowed with magnificent public and private facilities for the augustus Maximian. Beginning in 293 a large circus was built there, connected to the nearby imperial residence (located east of the facility), as well as a mint with three workshops (from 294/296 to 425). After the descent of Attila's Huns and the subsequent devastation, the city never recovered, so much so that it shrank to half its size along the north-south axis.

The construction of the Patriarchal Basilica dates back to the early fourth century. Founded in 313 by Bishop Theodore with the direct support of Emperor Constantine, the buildings known as the Theodorian halls (the remains of which can still be visited in the nave of the present building and under the foundations of the bell tower) probably constitute the first public worship complex for Christians. The halls rested on pre-existing Roman buildings (probably horrea, vast Roman granaries that stood in the area near the basilica) whose perimeter walls were presumably reused. The two parallel halls (both about 37x20 m) were connected by a 29x13 m vestibule, next to which was the first baptistery. They both lacked an apse, with six columns supporting a richly decorated coffered ceiling and a floor consisting of an extraordinary mosaic complex. The north hall probably constituted the church proper, while the south hall (located where the present basilica stands) was a catechumenum, a place where baptized people received Christian instruction and prepared for entry into the community. The next phase of the basilica dates from the mid-4th century, during the time of Bishop Fortunatianus, with the expansion of the north hall (73x31 m) and the creation of new halls. The large basilica, divided into three naves by twenty-eight columns and without an apse was connected through the baptistery to the catechumenum and preceded by a large cloister (following a pattern also found in the contemporary Augusta Treverorum complex).

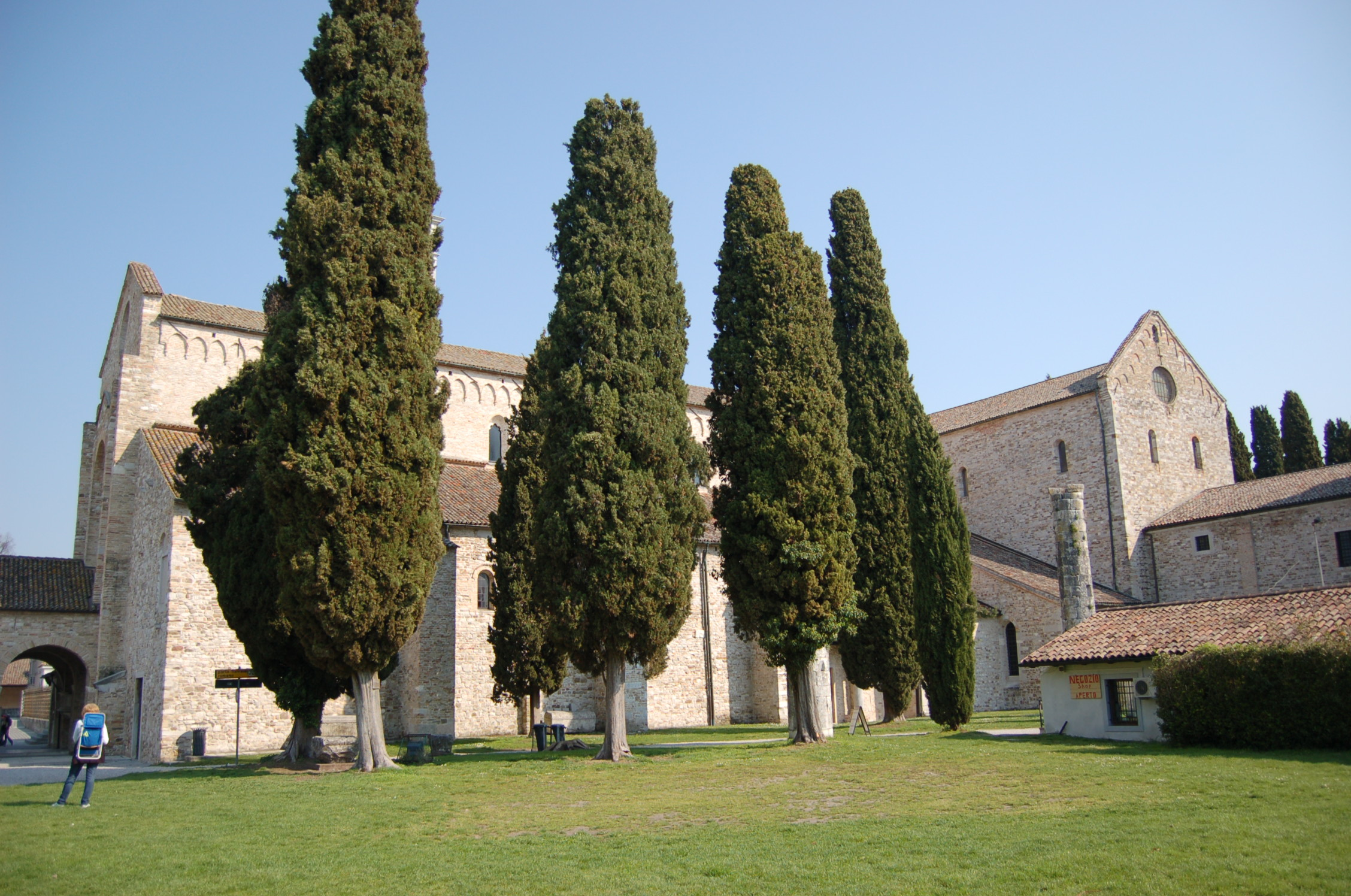
Area where some scholars speculate the imperial palace of Maximian was built, next to the present basilica of St. Mary of the Assumption

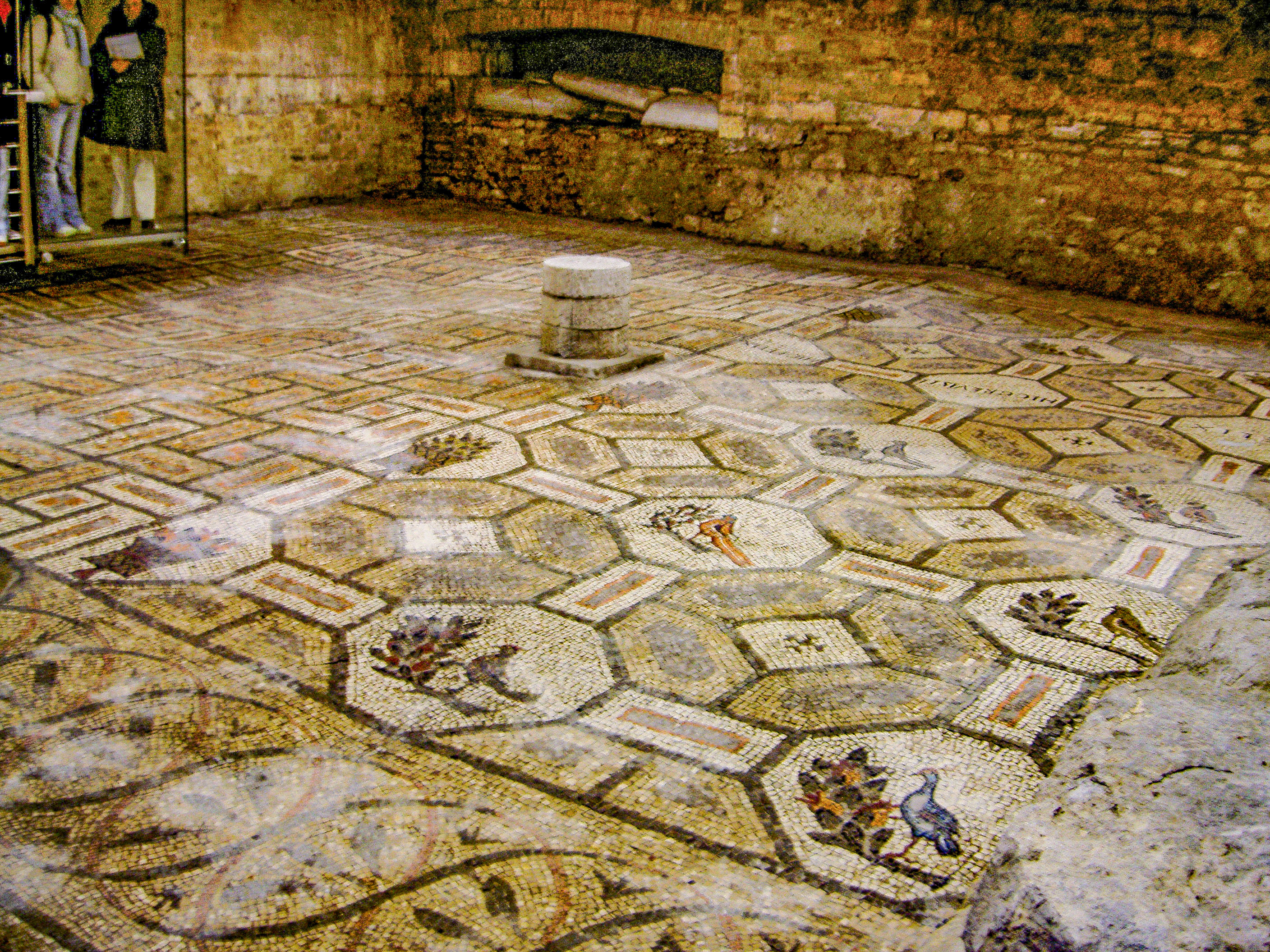
Crypt with ancient mosaics

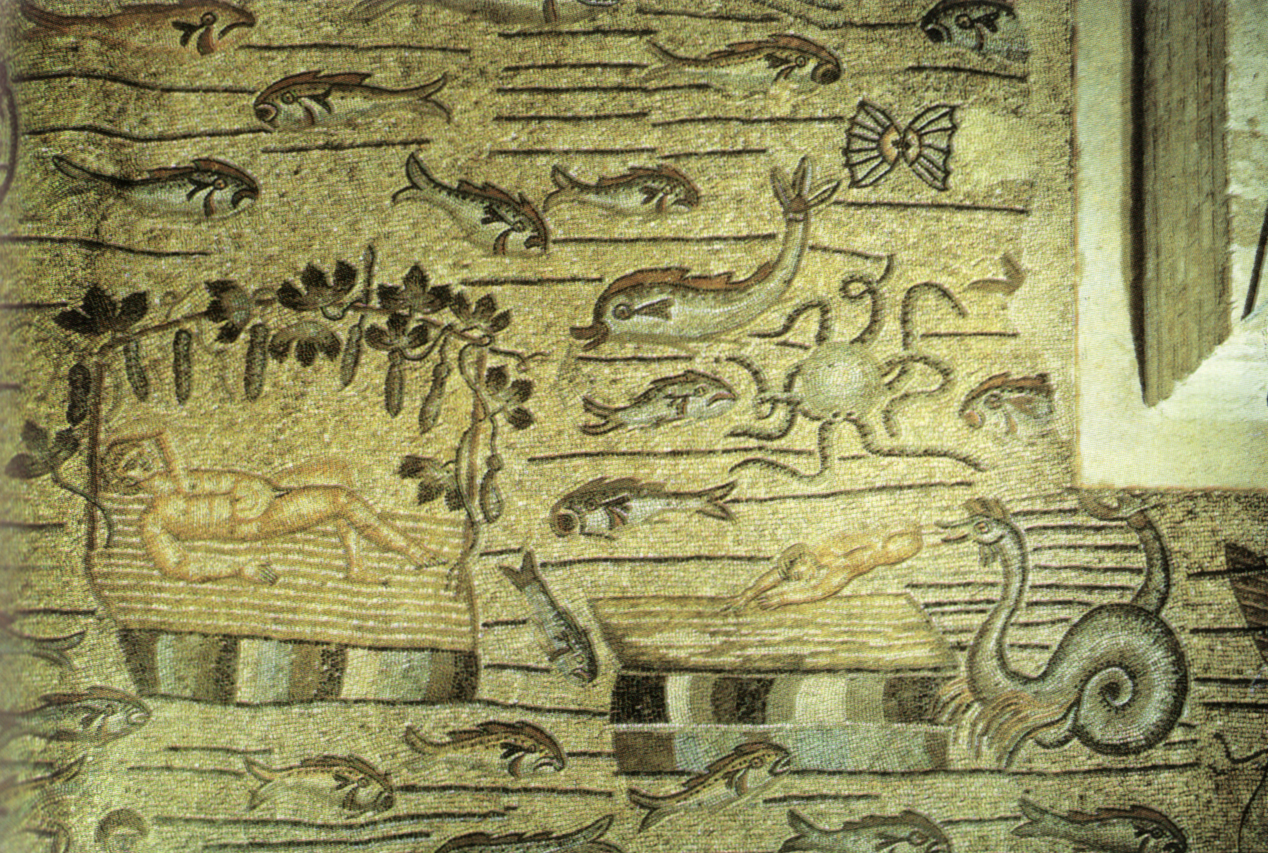
Stories of Jonah

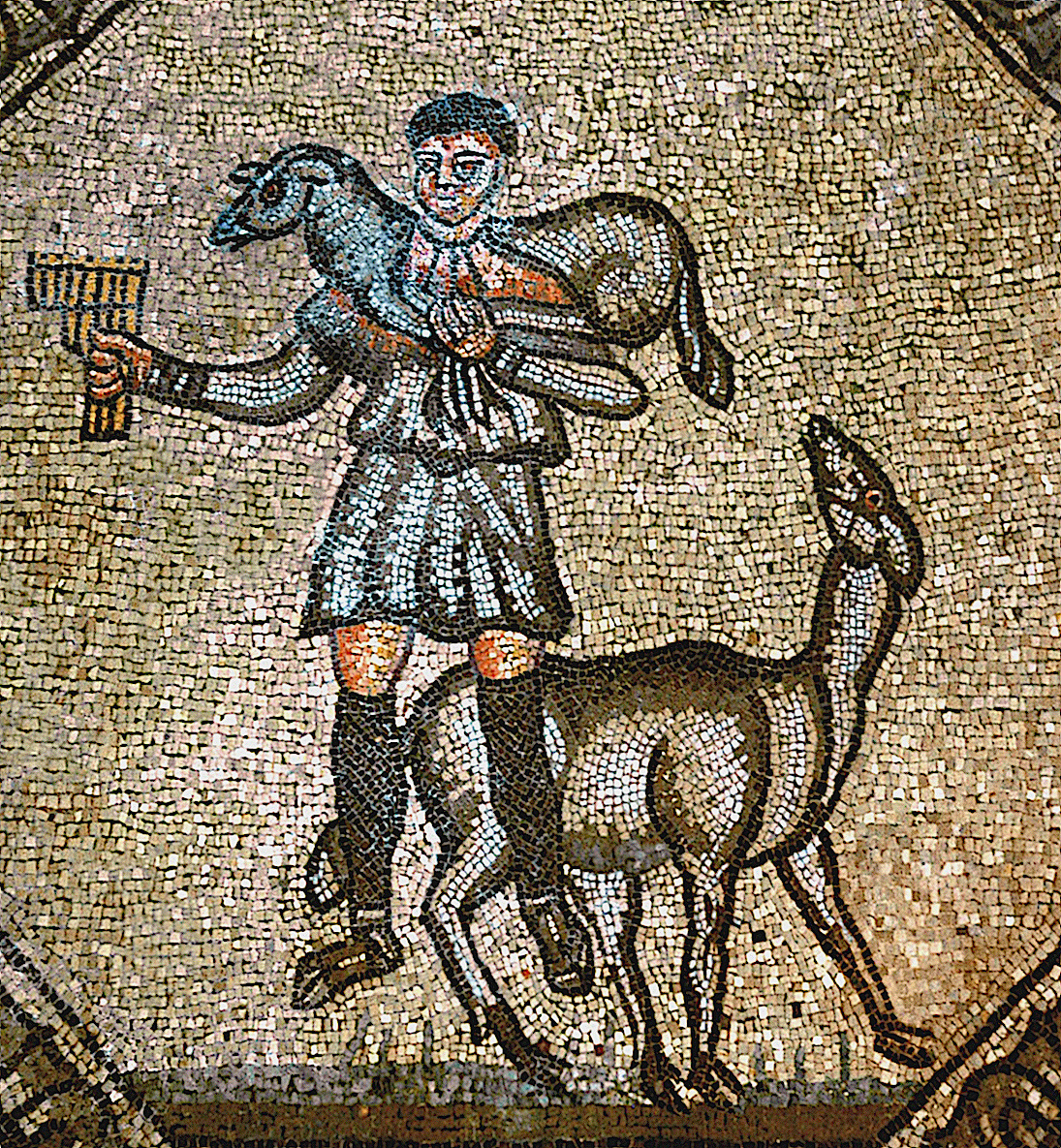
Good Shepherd

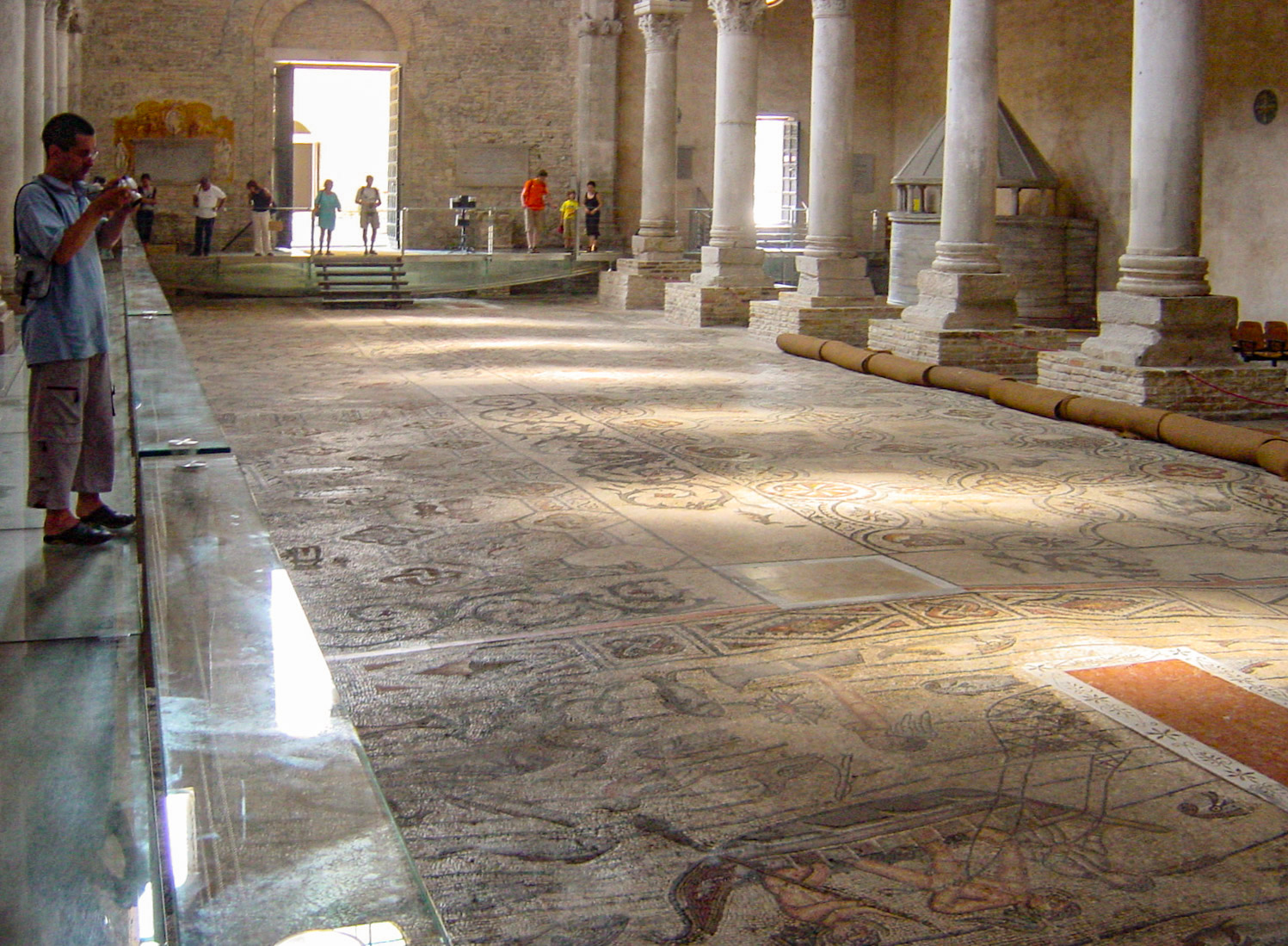
Interior, with a view of the mosaic floor.

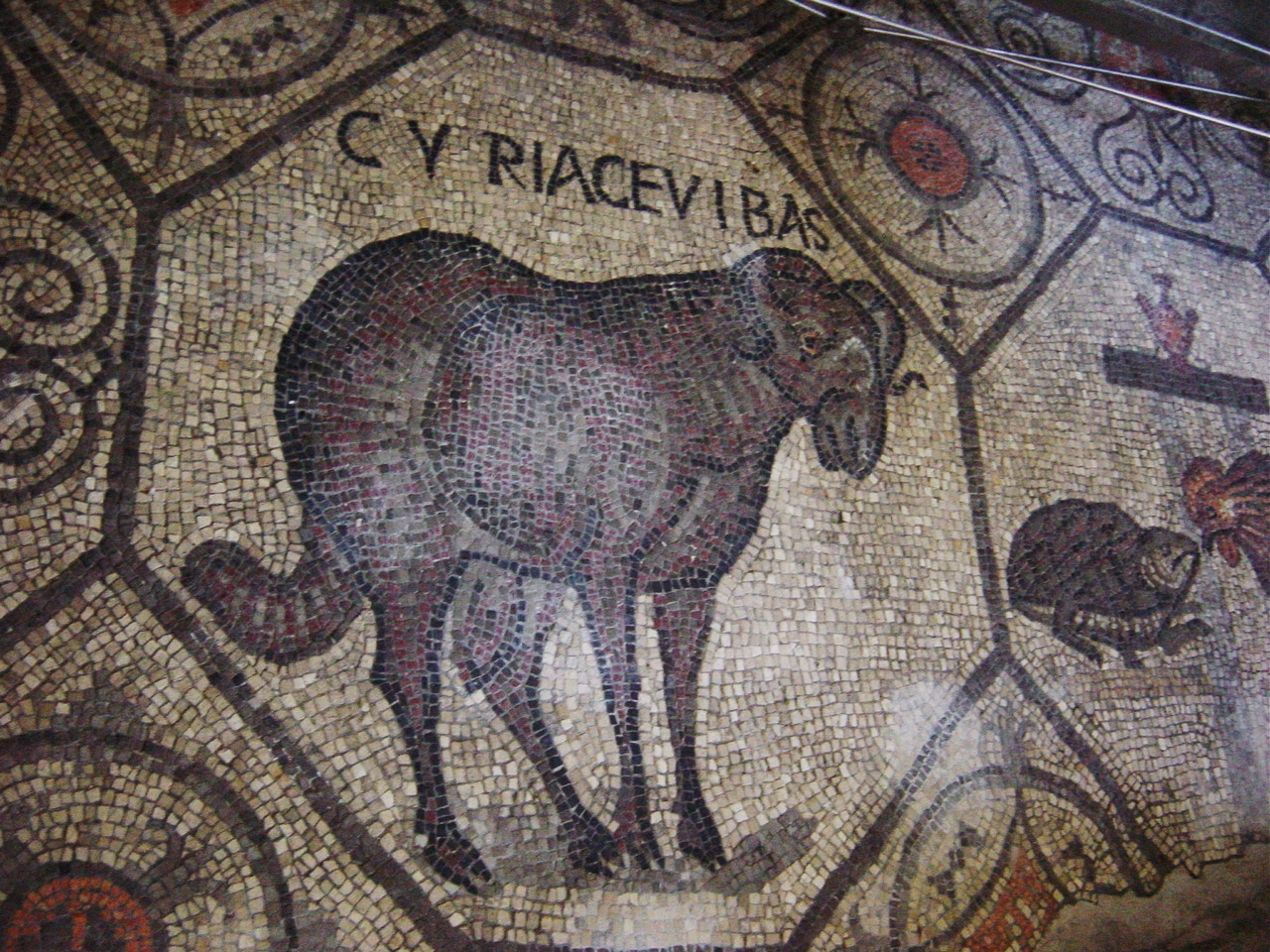
Early Christian mosaic.

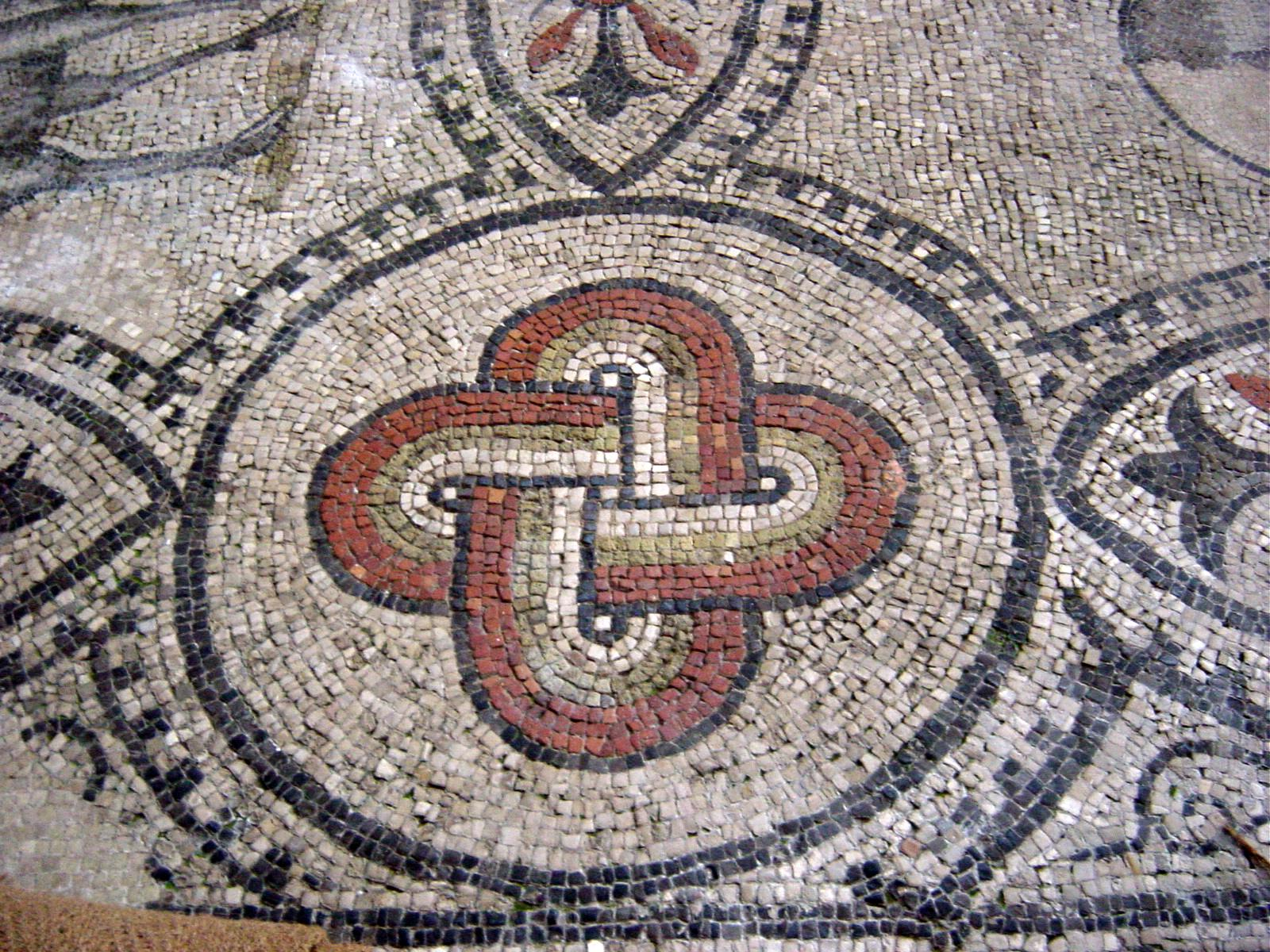
Mosaic.

== Aftermath ==
The authority of its church and the myth of a city that had been powerful survived, although by then its direct dominion was limited to a small territory that had its strengths in the urban area with its seaport and in the village of Grado. The latter developed and gained increasing importance following the Lombard invasion in 568. From that time the region of Aquileia was divided between the Roman-Byzantines (who occupied its coastal area) and the Lombards (the inland part). In the 8th century the seat of the patriarchate was moved to the safer Cividale.

Around the year 1000 there was a rebirth of the city, which regained great prestige under Patriarch Poppo (1019–45), who returned the seat to Aquileia.

== See also ==
- Aquileia Dish
- Basilica di Santa Maria Assunta, Aquileia
- National Archaeological Museum of Aquileia

== Bibliography ==
Primary sources

- Ammianus Marcellinus, Res Gestae, XV-XXV; Latin text and English translation HERE.
- Anonymus Valesianus, V; Latin text and English translation HERE.
- Appian of Alexandria, Illyrian War, English translation HERE Archived 2017-10-22 at the Wayback Machine.
- Aurelius Victor, De Caesaribus, XXXIX and XLI, Latin version HERE; Epitome, XLI Latin version HERE; De Viris Illustribus, Latin version HERE.
- Decimus Magnus Ausonius, Ordo urbium nobilium.
- Cassius Dio, Roman History, XII, 51-52, English translation HERE.
- Caesar, De bello Gallico (Latin text).
- Herodian, History of the empire after Marcus Aurelius.
- Eutropius, Breviarium historiae romanae (Latin text).
- Fasti Triumphales: AE 1930, 60.
- Historia Augusta, Didius Iulianus, Antoninus Geta, Valerianus, Gallienus, Claudius, Aurelianus and Carus; Latin text and English translation HERE.
- Livy,
  - Ab Urbe condita libri (Latin text);
  - Periochae (Latin text).
- Orosius, History against the Pagans, VII.
- Paul the Deacon, Historia romana, XIV.
- Pliny the Elder, Naturalis Historia, III.
- Panegyrici latini, IV and XII; See Latin text here.
- Polybius, Histories, II; English translation HERE.
- Strabo, Geographica, V; English translation HERE.
- Suetonius, The Twelve Caesars.
- Tacitus, Historiae (Latin text) with the English translation HERE.
- Velleius Paterculus, Historiae Romanae ad M. Vinicium libri duo, I.
- Zonaras, Epitome of Histories, VIII and XII; Latin text.
- Zosimus, New History, I-II English translation of book I, HERE.

Modern historiographical sources

- AAVV, Milano, Touring Club Italiano, 2005.
- Barnes, Timothy (1981). Constantine and Eusebius. Cambridge: MA Harvard University Press. ISBN 978-0-674-16530-4.
- Timothy Barnes, The New Empire of Diocletian and Constantine, Cambridge MA, Harvard University Press, 1982. ISBN 0-7837-2221-4.
- Luisa Bertacchi, Aquileia: l'organizzazione urbanistica, in Milano capitale dell'Impero romani (286-402 d.C.), catalogo della Mostra Milano capitale dell'Impero romani (286-402 d.C.) tenutasi a Milano, Palazzo Reale dal 24 gennaio al 22 aprile del 1990, Ed.Silvana Milano, 1990, pp. 209–212.
- Alan Bowman, Peter Garnsey e Averil Cameron, The Cambridge ancient history - XII. The Crisis of the Empire A.D. 193-337, Cambridge University Press, 2005, ISBN 0-521-30199-8.
- J.Carcopino, Giulio Cesare, Milano 1981.
- A.Degrassi, Per quale via i Cimbri calarono nella Val Padana, in Scritti vari di antichità, II, Roma 1962.
- Tony Honoré, Law in the Crisis of Empire (379-455), Oxford University Press, 1998. ISBN 0-19-826078-4.
- E.Horst, Costantino il Grande, Milano 1987.
- Lawrence Keppie, The making of the roman army, from Republic to Empire, Oklahoma 1998.
- Massimiliano Pavan, Dall'Adriatico al Danubio, Padova 1991.
- A.Piganiol, Le conquiste dei Romani, Milano 1989.
- Michel Reddé, Voyages sur la Méditerranée romaine, Éditions Errance, Arles, 2005.
- Southern, Pat (2001). The Roman Empire: from Severus to Constantine. London & New York: Routledge/Taylor & Francis Group.
- Watson, Alaric (1999). Aurelian and the Third Century. London & New York: Routledge.
