= Gordian dynasty =

238-244 Roman imperial dynasty

- 238–244
Maximinus Thrax	Philip the Arab
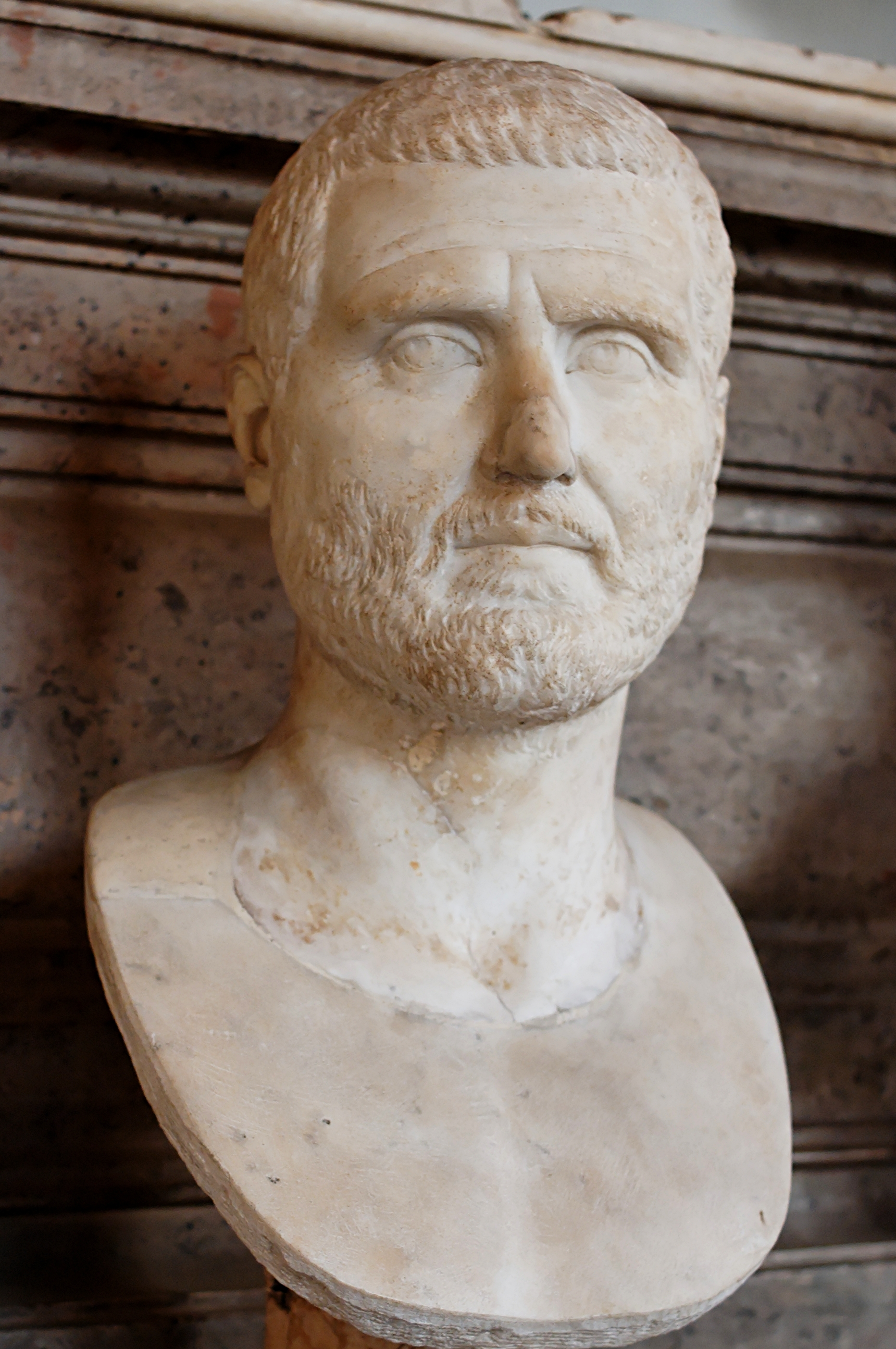
- A bust of Gordian I, the first ruler of the Gordian dynasty
- Monarchs: Gordian I; Gordian II; Pupienus (non-dynastic); Balbinus (non-dynastic); Gordian III; Claudius II (debated)

The Gordian dynasty, sometimes known as the Gordianic dynasty, was short-lived, ruling the Roman Empire from 238 to 244 AD. The dynasty achieved the throne in 238 AD, after Gordian I and his son Gordian II rose up against Emperor Maximinus Thrax and were proclaimed co-emperors by the Roman Senate. Gordian II was killed by the governor of Numidia, Capelianus and Gordian I killed himself shortly after, only 22 days after he was declared emperor. In 238, Pupienus and Balbinus, who were not of the Gordian dynasty, were declared co-emperors but the Senate was forced to make Gordian III a third co-emperor in 238, due to the demands of the Roman people. Maximinus attempted to invade Italy but he was killed by his own soldiers when his army became frustrated. After this, the Praetorian Guard killed Pupienus and Balbinus, leaving Gordian III as the sole emperor. Gordian III ruled until AD 244 when he was either killed after his betrayal by Philip the Arab, or killed at the Battle of Misiche; with his death, the dynasty was ended and Philip the Arab became emperor.

== History ==
The Gordian dynasty was founded by Gordian I, the governor of Africa Proconsularis (Roman Africa). Gordian I was said to be related to prominent senators of his time, and his praenomen and nomen Marcus Antonius suggest his ancestors became citizens under the Triumvir Mark Antony, or one of his daughters, during the late Roman Republic. Gordian's cognomen Gordianus indicates that his family origins were originally from Anatolia, in the region of Galatia or Cappadocia.

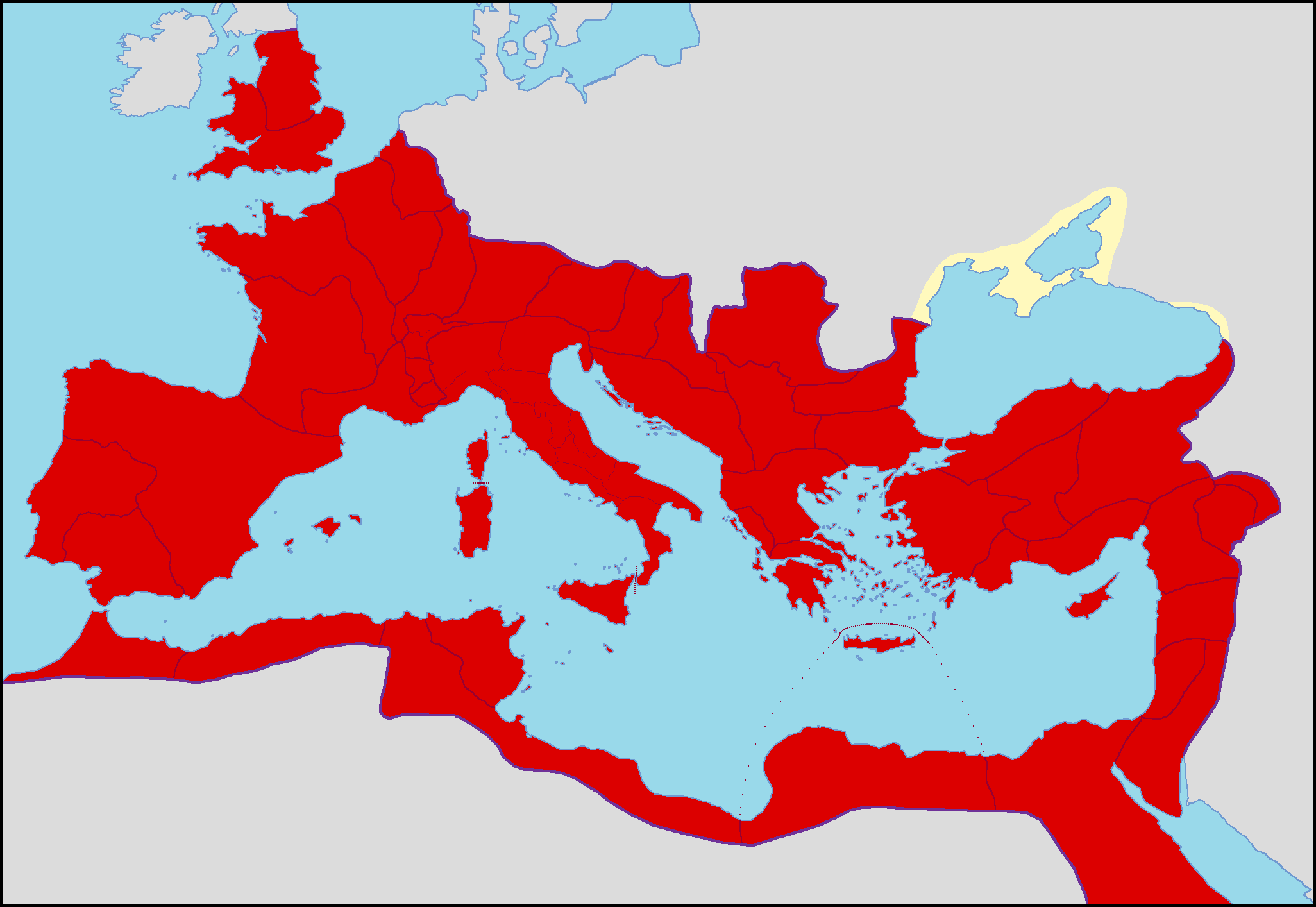
A map of the Roman Empire in this period

The Gordian dynasty rose in opposition to Maximinus Thrax, who had been proclaimed Emperor by the army but not the Senate and whose reign from 235 to 238 AD, was tyrannous. Maximinus embezzled from the Aerarium (public treasury) and expropriated taxes collected by cities. He reversed the religious reforms of Emperor Severus Alexander, which had increased tolerance toward Christianity. During his reign, the popes Pontian and Anterus were put to death, along with the antipope Hippolytus. There was a vast amount of corruption during his rule, with his favored officials prosecuting individuals on false charges and extorting huge fines. His abuses towards the population led to an uprising in the province of Africa in 238, where the people revolted and killed his tax collectors. The movement gathered momentum rapidly, especially among the army, who proclaimed Gordian I emperor.

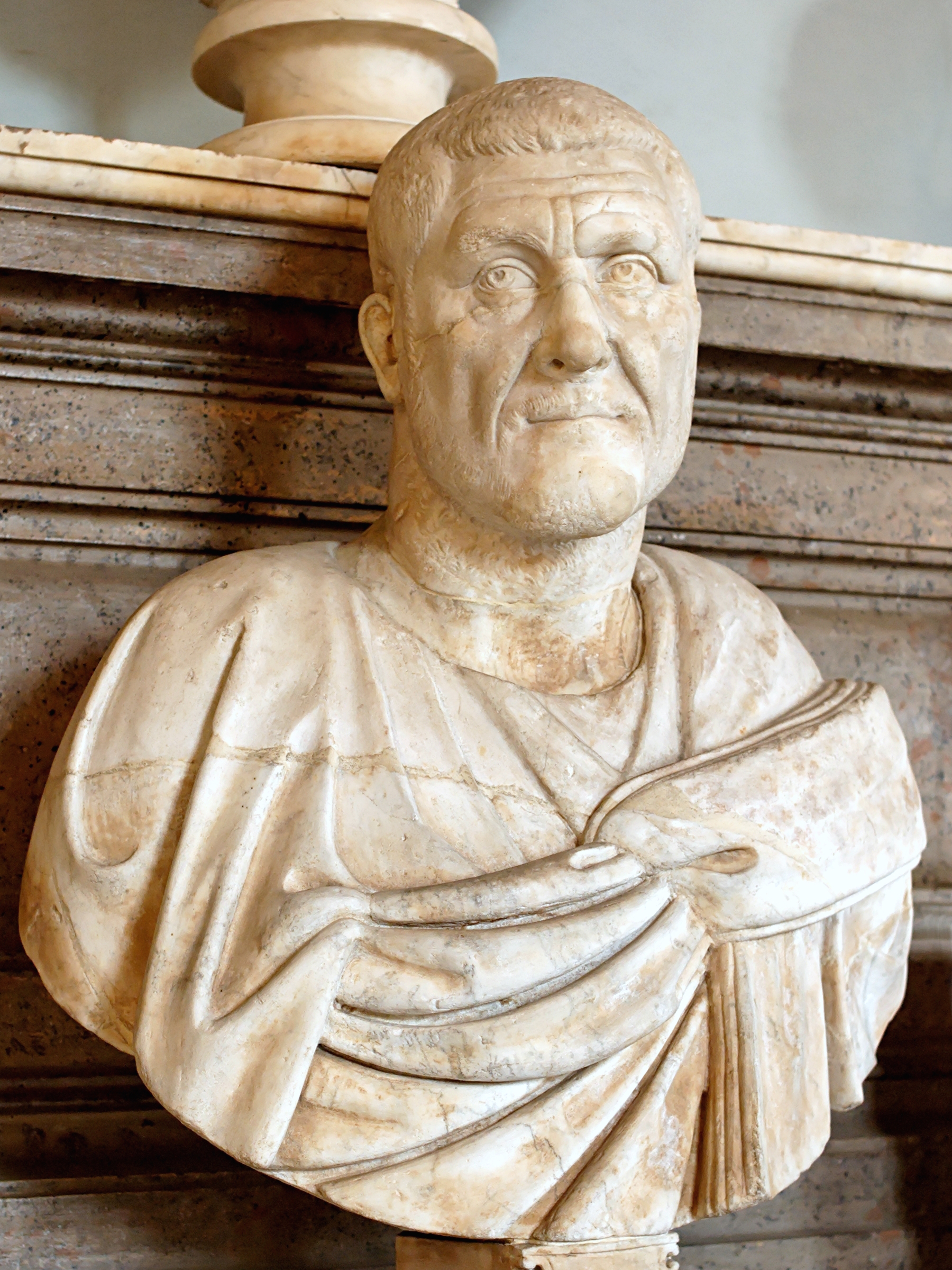
A bust of Emperor Maximinus Thrax

A delegation of centurions was sent to Rome from Africa, to assassinate Publius Aelius Vitalianus, the Praetorian prefect and to spread a rumor that Maximinus had been killed while campaigning against the Sarmatians. The Senate believed the rumor and proclaimed Gordian I and his son Gordian II as co-emperors in 238. Soon after, Capillianus, governor of Numidia, invaded Africa and succeeded in killing Gordian II during the Battle of Carthage. Gordian I, shortly thereafter, hanged himself out of grief. Both emperors never reached Rome, remaining in Africa for their short reign. Following the news of both emperors' deaths, the Senate formed a committee of twenty senators to elect the next emperor, resulting in the election of two of the senators on the committee, Pupienus and Balbinus in 238.

Large crowds gathered in Rome, demanding that a blood relative of Gordian I also be made emperor. The Senate conceded and elected Gordian III, the son of Gordian I's daughter Maecia Faustina, as the third emperor in 238. News of the Gordians' rebellion reached Maximinus, who was still campaigning against the Sarmatians in Pannonia and he marched on Italy with his Pannonian Legions. He attempted to gain the allegiance of the fortified city of Aquileia but failed and laid siege to it. His troops became disaffected during the unexpected siege, at which time they suffered from famine and disease. In May 238, Maximinus' soldiers rose up and killed him, along with his son, Maximus. On 29 July 238, Pupienus and Balbinus were killed by the Praetorian Guard, who proclaimed Gordian III sole emperor.

When the Sassanids invaded the Roman Empire in 241, occupying the province of Syria and capturing Antioch and Carrhae, Gordian III sent Timesitheus to counterattack. He recaptured the cities and won a decisive victory at Battle of Resaena. Between 242 and 243, while leading troops across the Euphrates, Timesitheus fell ill and died from what is believed to have been an intestinal infection. In 244, Gordian III also died, although the manner of his death is a matter of debate. There is evidence that Philip the Arab, who had been deputy Praetorian prefect and who rose to the title of Praetorian prefect after the death of Timesitheus, undermined Gordian III's authority. Zosimus and the Historia Augusta said that Philip the Arab conspired to have him killed by sabotaging supplies to turn the army against him. Orosius, Festus, John of Antioch and Eutropius assert that Philip the Arab played a more direct role in having him killed, beginning to conspire after Gordian III won a great victory in Persia. George Syncellus and the Epitome de Caesaribus say that Philip began conspiring against him before the army had reached Ctesiphon and not after a great victory. Byzantine and Persian sources, Zonaras and Cedrenus and the Persian King Shapur I, wrote that Gordian III died in the Battle of Misiche. Philip the Arab claimed the throne after Gordian III died.

== Numismatics ==
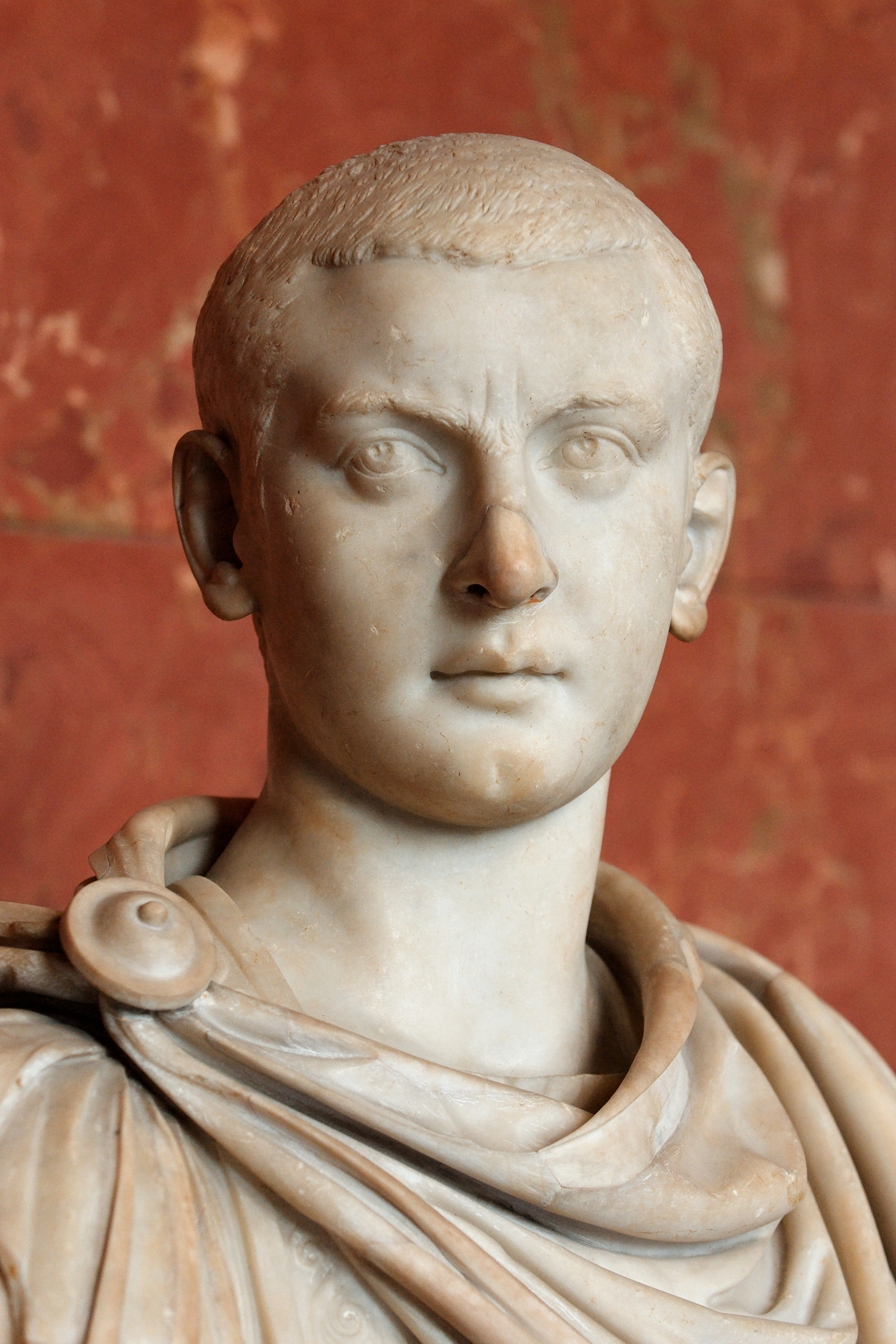
A bust of Emperor Gordian III

During the reign of Gordian III, changes took place in Roman numismatics. The Tetradrachm, a coin equivalent to four drachmae, was produced again, having not been minted since the reign of Elagabalus, between 218 and 222, during which only two mints produced it and not having been widely minted since the reign of Macrinus, between 217 and 218. The production of Tetradrachms continued after Gordian's death, being widely produced until 253. The Antoninianus, equivalent to 20 Assēs, which had been abandoned during the reign of Elagabalus, was brought back and rapidly replaced the denarius, which was equivalent to 10 Assēs. After 240, apart from two large issues struck under Gordian, the denarius was only produced locally until it was brought back by Aurelian in 270.

During the reign of Gordian III, the lack of uniformity in coin weight and quality became severe, with eastern mints consistently creating heavier and purer coins. The Antoninianuses minted in Antioch had an average silver fineness of 43.5 percent, whereas those of Rome had an average silver fineness of 36.8 percent. Because both coins were of similar average weight, the Antiochian coins were 15 percent purer than the Rome equivalents. The mint at Antioch became more important under Gordian, striking even gold coins, something previously only mints in the capital of Rome did on a large scale. During the reign of Gordian, provincial silver coins, produced from the important mints of Antioch, Caesarea, and Alexandria, increasingly came to be used by the state for funding, becoming roughly equal in use to that of the Antoninianus.

Throughout the reign of Gordian III, coins were used to establish his legitimacy and fitness to rule. Early in his reign, a large number of coins declaring the Virtus (virtue) of Gordian III were minted but later coins bearing such a description ceased to be minted. The reason for this is likely that Gordian III, who was very young and had never had any military position, was attempting to establish his virtus to the army to compensate for his lack of experience. Late in his reign, coins depicted Gordian holding a Victoriola, a statue which represents victory, thereby declaring himself to possess 'victory' itself.

== Politics ==
Due to Gordian III's young age, 13 at the time he became emperor, Gordian III was controlled by other figures. It is unknown who influenced him between the time of him becoming sole emperor in April 238 and his marriage to Tranquillina in 241; however it is known that after marrying Tranquillina, Gordian came under the control of his new father-in-law Timesitheus. Timesitheus' indirect rule would be short-lived, as he would die in mysterious circumstances, possibly illness, in 243.

During the Gordian dynasty, several reforms were made, mostly in provincial administration, fiscal policy, and the army. Under Gordian III, reforms were made to limit frivolous lawsuits. Attention was also given to strengthening the defenses of the Roman frontiers and punishing any abuses of power in the provinces. Despite the efforts of the dynasty, this period was marked by political and economic upheaval, Gordian enacted a rescript that removed the four-year statute of limitation on seeking restitution of soldiers and state officials. Of the surviving rescripts issued by Gordian, 13 percent went to soldiers. During his reign, the Roman Empire paid tribute to the Goths systematically, to prevent raids. The Gordian dynasty reversed the policy of persecuting Christians established by Maximinus, much of which was the prosecution of bishops and popes. Because Gordian III ended this persecution, Eusebius claims that Gordian III became Christian and served penance for the sins of Maximinus.

== Family tree ==
GORDIAN DYNASTY family tree

previous Maximinus Thrax; Roman Emperor; 235–238	Pupienus; Roman Emperor; 238	Gordian I Roman Emperor; 238 ∞ (?) Fabia Orestilla	Nerva-Antonine Dynasty, perhaps? (For Gordian I,the connection is through his probable wife, Fabia Orestilla)
Balbinus; Roman Emperor; 238	Gordian II co-emperor 238	Maecia Faustina (called by modern historians as Antonia Gordiana)	(doubted); Junius Licinius Balbus consul suffectus	Gaius Furius Sabinius Aquila Timesitheus praetorian prefect	next Philip the Arab; Roman Emperor; 244–249
Claudius II Gothicus (perhaps, although disputed, if so, his brother Quintillus became the next emperor and is also a member of the Gordianic dynasty); Roman Emperor; 268–270	Gordian III; Roman Emperor; 238-244	Furia Sabinia Tranquillina	Philip II; Roman Emperor co-emperor 247–249
CONSTANTINIAN DYNASTY, probably spurious
(see Family tree of Byzantine emperors)
