= Emperor Gordian =

Emperor Gordian may refer to:

- Gordian I of Rome
- Gordian II of Rome
- Gordian III of Rome
