= Vitalian (praetorian prefect) =

Vitalianus or Anglicized into Vitalian (died 238) was a Praetorian Prefect during the reign of the Roman Emperor Maximinus Thrax. He is mainly notable for being assassinated in the course of the revolt by the Roman Senate on behalf of Gordian I and Gordian II, a step deemed necessary due to the terror he apparently instilled in the people of Rome in Maximinus' own absence. According to the historian Herodian, Vitalianus was killed by a group of soldiers who gained an audience with him on the pretext of carrying secret messages concerning Maximinus.
