= Year of the Six Emperors =

Year with six claimants as Emperor of Rome (238 CE)

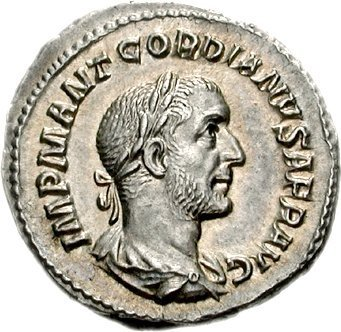
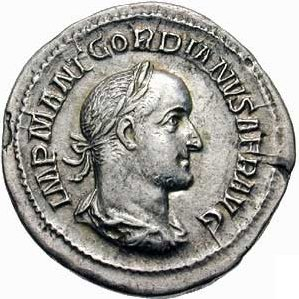
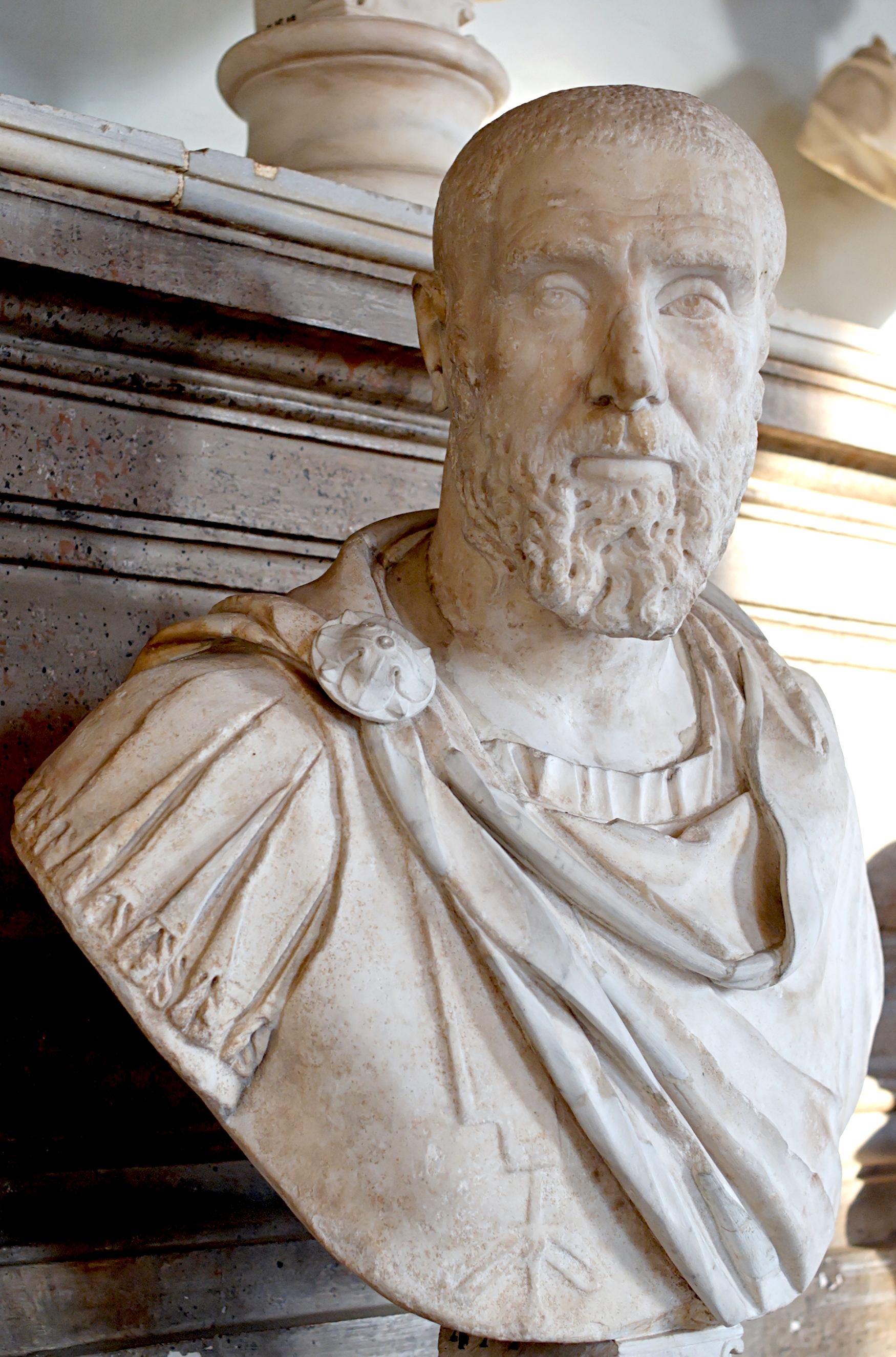
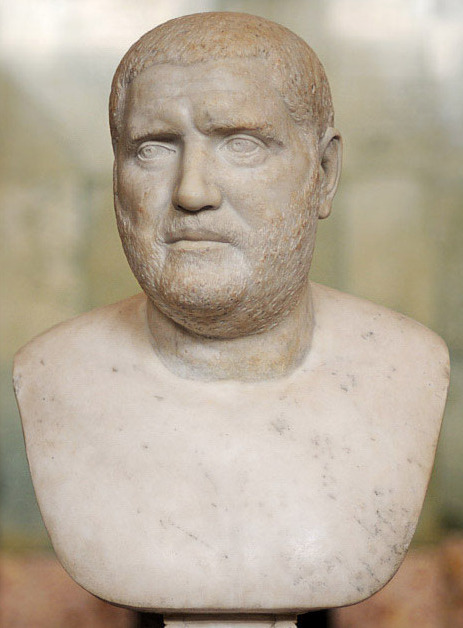
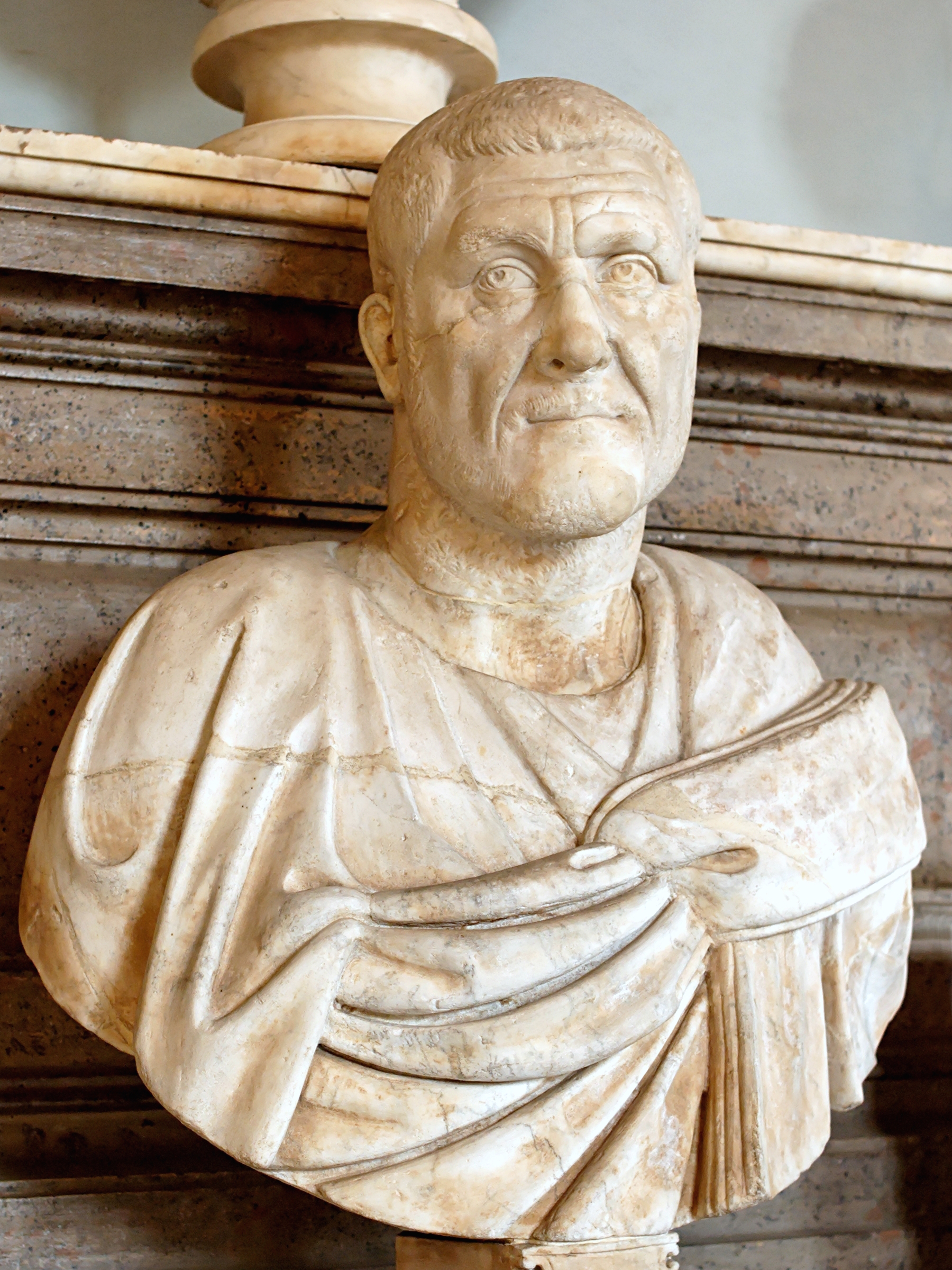
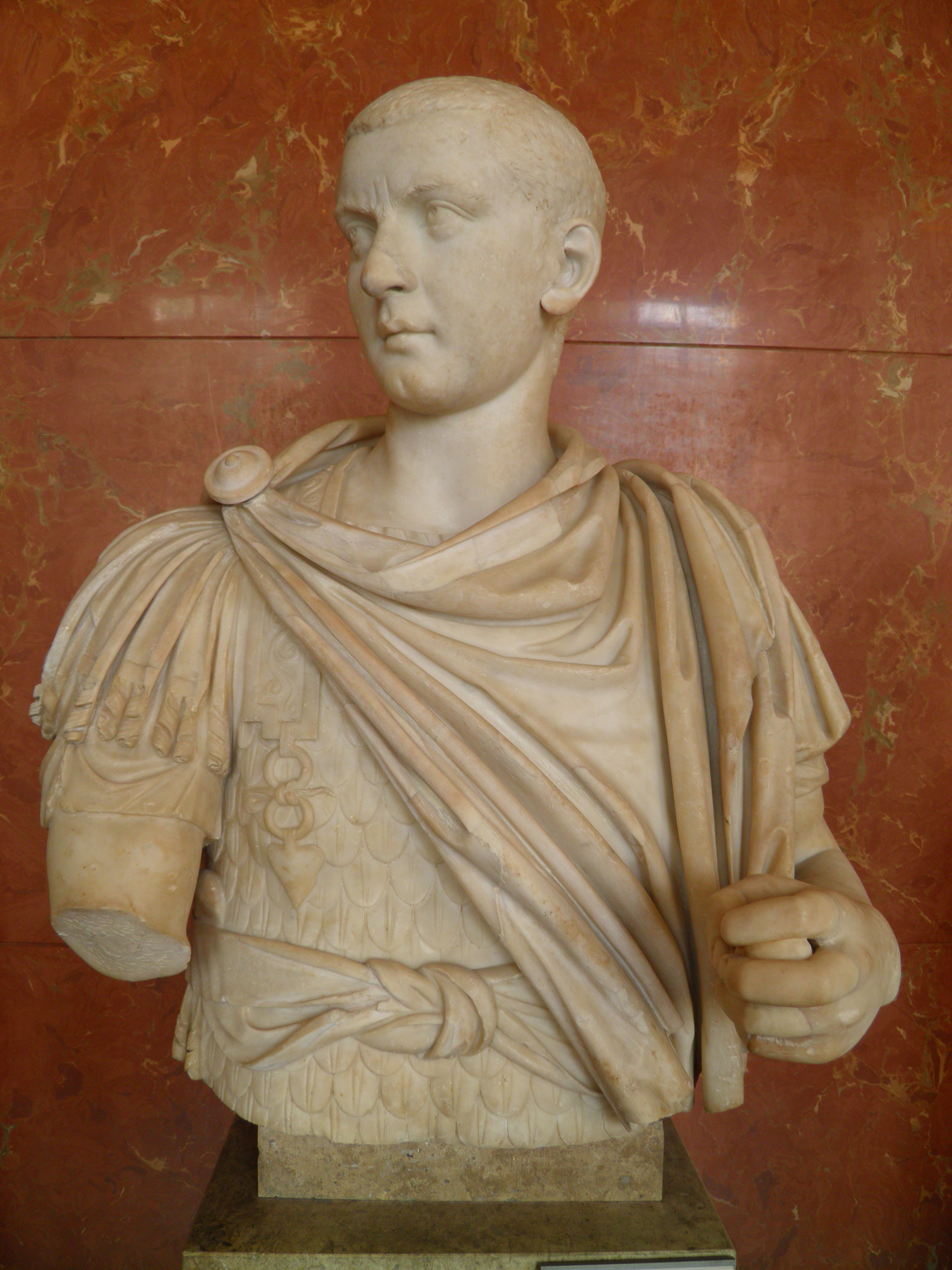
Top row: Gordian I and Gordian II.
Middle row: Pupienus and Balbinus.
Bottom row: Maximinus Thrax and Gordian III.

The Year of the Six Emperors was the year 238 CE, during which at least six different men made claims to be emperors of Rome. The events of the year were characteristic of the period dubbed the Crisis of the Third Century (235–285 CE) by later historians.

The year began with Maximinus Thrax as ruler of the Roman Empire. A tax revolt in the province of Africa briefly saw Gordian I and his son Gordian II proclaimed co-emperors and recognized as such by the Senate in Rome. The African revolt was swiftly crushed, and the Senate, fearing reprisal from Maximinus for supporting the now-dead Gordians, proclaimed Pupienus and Balbinus as new emperors and charged them with defending the capital. Bowing to popular pressure, the Senate also elevated the 13-year-old Gordian III, grandson of Gordian I. During the subsequent siege of Aquileia, Maximinus was assassinated by his own troops. Pupienus and Balbinus were later murdered by the Praetorian Guard, leaving Gordian III the sole nominal ruler of the empire.

Although most often referred to as the Year of Six Emperors, there were actually seven different individuals who claimed imperial title over the course of the year. As such, it is referred to as the Year of the Seven Emperors in some literature on the subject. The discrepancy lies in whether to count Gaius Julius Verus Maximus, the son of Maximinus Thrax, who bore the title caesar but was never proclaimed full augustus. Edward Gibbon, in his History of the Decline and Fall of the Roman Empire, includes Maximus when he notes how "in the space of a few months, six princes had been cut off by the sword", before Gordian III became sole emperor.

== History ==
Europe, North Africa and the Near East in 230 CE

=== Maximinus Thrax ===
The emperor at the beginning of the year was Maximinus Thrax, who had ruled since March 235. Later sources claim he was a cruel tyrant, and a revolt erupted in North Africa in early 238. The Historia Augusta states:

The Romans could bear his barbarities no longer—the way in which he called up informers and incited accusers, invented false offences, killed innocent men, condemned all whoever came to trial, reduced the richest men to utter poverty and never sought money anywhere save in some other's ruin, put many generals and many men of consular rank to death for no offence, carried others about in wagons without food and drink, and kept others in confinement, in short neglected nothing which he thought might prove effectual for cruelty—and, unable to suffer these things longer, they rose against him in revolt.

=== Gordian I and Gordian II ===
Some young aristocrats in Africa murdered the imperial tax collector, then approached the regional governor, Gordian, and insisted that he proclaim himself emperor. Gordian agreed reluctantly, but as he was almost 80 years old, he decided to make his son joint emperor, with equal power. The Senate recognised father and son as emperors Gordian I and Gordian II, respectively.

Their reign, however, lasted for only three weeks. Capelianus, the governor of the neighbouring province of Numidia, held a grudge against the Gordians. He led an army to fight them and defeated them decisively at Carthage. Gordian II was killed in the battle, and on hearing this news, Gordian I hanged himself. Both Gordians were deified by the senate.

=== Pupienus, Balbinus and Gordian III ===
Meanwhile, Maximinus, now declared a public enemy, had already begun to march on Rome with another army. The Senate, knowing that they stood to die if he emerged victorious, needed a new emperor. With no other candidates in view, they elected two elderly senators, Pupienus and Balbinus (who had both been part of a special senatorial commission to deal with Maximinus), as joint emperors.

This choice was not popular with the people, however, and mobs threw stones and sticks at the new emperors. Therefore, Gordian III, the thirteen-year-old grandson of Gordian I, was nominated as heir to the throne in order to appease the residents of the capital, who were still loyal to the Gordian family.

Pupienus was sent at the head of an army to face Maximinus, and Balbinus stayed in Rome. Meanwhile, Maximinus was also having problems. In early February, he reached the city of Aquileia, to find that it had declared for his three enemies. Maximinus besieged the city, but without success. Discontent due to this failure, the lack of success in the campaign in general, lack of supplies and the strong opposition from the Senate, caused his men to rethink their allegiance. Soldiers of the Legio II Parthica killed Maximinus in his tent, along with his son Maximus (who had been appointed heir in 236), and surrendered to Pupienus at the end of June. Maximinus' and his son's corpses were decapitated and their heads carried to Rome. For saving Rome from a public enemy, the soldiers were pardoned and sent back to their provinces.

The co-emperor then returned to Rome, only to find the city in riot. Balbinus had not managed to control the situation, and the city had burned in a fire, resulting in rebellion. With both emperors present, the situation calmed down, but the unease remained.

Coins from their reign show one of them on one side and two clasped hands on the other to show their joint power, yet their relationship was clouded with suspicion from the start, with each fearing assassination by the other. They were planning an enormous double campaign, Pupienus against the Parthians and Balbinus against the Carpians (Grant says against the Goths and the Persians, respectively), but they quarreled frequently and could not agree or trust each other.

It was during one of these heated discussions that the Praetorian Guard decided to intervene. They stormed into the room containing the emperors, seized them both, stripped them, dragged them naked through the streets, tortured and eventually murdered them. On the same day, Gordian III was proclaimed sole emperor (238–244), though in reality his advisors exercised most of his power. Together Pupienus and Balbinus had ruled for only 99 days.

== Chronology ==
The chronology of the year 238 is highly disputed. The only primary sources are documents from Egypt that mention the reigning emperor at the time. These indicate the following:

- 7 April: Last mention of Maximinus
- 13 June: Gordians are already recognised
- 21 July: First mention of Pupienus and Balbinus
- 8 September: Last mention of Pupienus and Balbinus
- 21 September: First mention of Gordian III

News of events in Rome could take a whole month to reach Egypt, so it can be deduced that Gordian III's proclamation took place in August or late July. An inscription in Syria dated to 27 March may indicate that his reign began much earlier. The emperor's name is obliterated, and Maurice Sartre identifies him as Gordian. However, Richard Burgess considers that the rest of the evidence better matches Maximinus, who did indeed suffer from damnatio memoriae (unlike Gordian). The papyri show that Maximinus was still reigning in early March, which does not allow enough time for the reigns of the Gordians, nor of Pupienus or Balbinus. Some authors date the proclamation of the Gordians to 2 April, the day of an eclipse. However, this is only mentioned in the infamous Historia Augusta and it's most likely a fabrication. Other details of the chronology can be gleaned from later evidence: Pupienus and Balbinus are known to have ruled for 99 days (i.e. 3 months), which places their proclamation in April/May. The Gordians ruled for 22 days, which gives a proclamation date in March/April. Peachin suggests that Maximinus died in early June, although this is not certain. Herodian indicates that the Gordian rebelled shortly after Maximinus completed his third regnal year, i.e. shortly after March (more precisely, 23 March). Eutropius indicates that Maximinus reigned "3 years and a few days", which again gives a date between late March and early April, which likely refers to the accession of the Gordians and not his actual death.

== See also ==
- Year of the Four Emperors (69 CE)
- Year of the Five Emperors (193 CE)

== Ancient sources ==
- Historia Augusta
- Herodian

== Modern sources ==
- Henning Börm: Die Herrschaft des Kaisers Maximinus Thrax und das Sechskaiserjahr 238. Der Beginn der "Reichskrise"?, in: Gymnasium 115, 2008, pp. 69–86.
- David Potter: The Roman Empire at Bay. London 2004, pp. 167–172.
