= Gordian I =

Roman emperor in 238

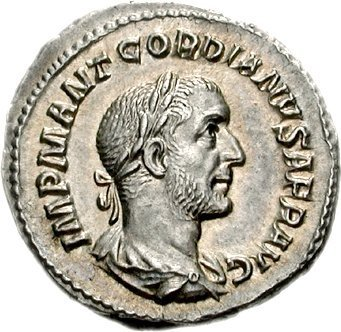
- Gordian I on a denarius. Inscription: IMP. CAES. M. ANT. GORDIANVS AFR. AVG.

Roman emperor
- Reign: c. March – April 238
- Predecessor: Maximinus Thrax
- Successor: Pupienus and Balbinus
- Co-emperor: Gordian II
- Born: c. 158 possibly Phrygia, Galatia
- Died: April 238 (aged about 80); Carthage, Africa Proconsularis
- Spouse: Fabia Orestilla (purportedly)
- Issue: Gordian II; Maecia Faustina
Names
- Marcus Antonius Gordianus Sempronianus Romanus
Regnal name
- Imperator Caesar Marcus Antonius Gordianus Sempronianus Romanus Africanus Augustus
- Dynasty: Gordian
- Father: Maecius Marullus (purportedly) or Marcus Antonius Gordianus
- Mother: Ulpia Gordiana (purportedly) or Sempronia Romana

Gordian I (Latin: Marcus Antonius Gordianus Sempronianus Romanus; c. 158 – April 238) was Roman emperor in 238 with his son Gordian II, during the Year of the Six Emperors. Caught up in a rebellion against the Emperor Maximinus Thrax, he was defeated in battle and committed suicide after the death of his son. He had the second shortest reign in imperial history, reigning for only 22 days.

== Family and background ==
Gordian I was said to be related to prominent senators of his time. His praenomen and nomen Marcus Antonius suggested that his paternal ancestors received Roman citizenship under the triumvir Mark Antony, or one of his daughters, during the late Roman Republic. Gordian's cognomen ‘Gordianus’ also indicates that his family origins were from Anatolia, more specifically Galatia or Cappadocia.

According to the Historia Augusta, his mother was a Roman woman called Ulpia Gordiana and his father was the senator Maecius Marullus. Many modern historians have dismissed his father's name as false, but PIR^{2} proposes that Maecius Marullus be identified as the son of a prominent Corinthian politician, Maecius Faustinus.

There may be some truth behind the Historia Augusta's identification of his mother. Gordian's family history can be guessed through inscriptions. The names Sempronianus Romanus in his name, for instance, may indicate a connection to his mother or grandmother. In Ankara, Turkey, a funeral inscription has been found that names a Sempronia Romana, daughter of a named Sempronius Aquila (an imperial secretary). Sempronia Romana erected this undated funeral inscription to her husband (whose name is lost), who died as a praetor-designate. French historian Christian Settipani has conjectured that Gordian I's parents were Marcus Antonius Gordianus (born c. 135), tr. pl. (tribunus plebis), praet. des. (praetor designatus, and wife Sempronia Romana (born c. 140), daughter of Titus Flavius Sempronius Aquila (c. 115), Secretarius ab epistulis Graecis, and wife Claudia (c. 120), daughter of an unknown father and his wife Claudia Tisamenis (c. 100), sister of Herodes Atticus. It appears in this family tree that the person who was related to Herodes Atticus was Gordian I's mother or grandmother and not his wife. But Anthony Birley stated that the question remains open.

Also according to the Historia Augusta, the wife of Gordian I was a Roman woman called Fabia Orestilla, born circa 165, whom the Historia Augusta claims was a descendant of emperors Antoninus Pius and Marcus Aurelius through her father Fulvus Antoninus. Modern historians have dismissed this name and her information as false. His wife died before 238. Christian Settipani identified her parents as Marcus Annius Severus, who was a suffect consul, and his wife Silvana, born circa 140, who was the daughter of Lucius Plautius Lamia Silvanus and his wife Aurelia Fadilla, the daughter of Antoninus Pius and wife Annia Galeria Faustina or Faustina the Elder.

With his wife, Gordian I had at least two children: a son of the same name and a daughter, called by Historia Augusta Maecia Faustina (who was the mother of the future Emperor Gordian III).

== Early life ==
Gordian steadily climbed the Roman imperial hierarchy when he became part of the Roman Senate. His political career started relatively late in his life and his early years were probably spent in rhetoric and literary studies. As a military man, Gordian commanded the Legio IV Scythica when the legion was stationed in Syria. He served as governor of Roman Britain in 216 and was a suffect consul sometime during the reign of Elagabalus. Inscriptions in Roman Britain bearing his name were partially erased suggesting some form of imperial displeasure during this role.

While he gained unbounded popularity on account of the magnificent games and shows he produced as aedile, his prudent and retired life did not excite the suspicion of Caracalla, in whose honor he wrote a long epic poem called "Antoninias". Gordian certainly retained his wealth and political clout during the chaotic times of the Severan dynasty which suggests a personal dislike for intrigue. Philostratus dedicated his work Lives of the Sophists to either him or his son, Gordian II.

== Rise to power ==
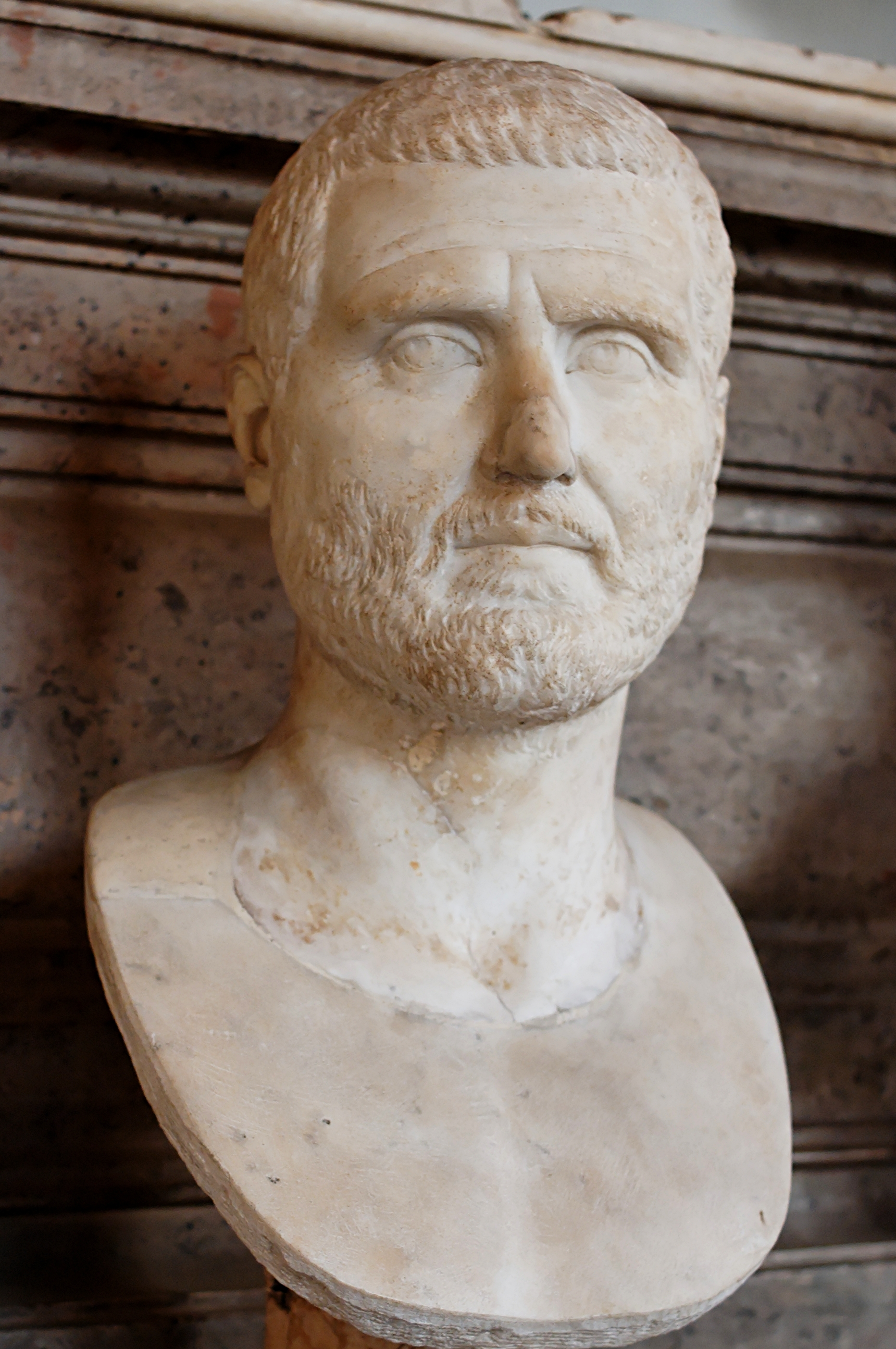
Early 3rd-century portrait head on a modern bust, labeled as Gordian I in the Capitoline Museums, Rome. The identification is uncertain.

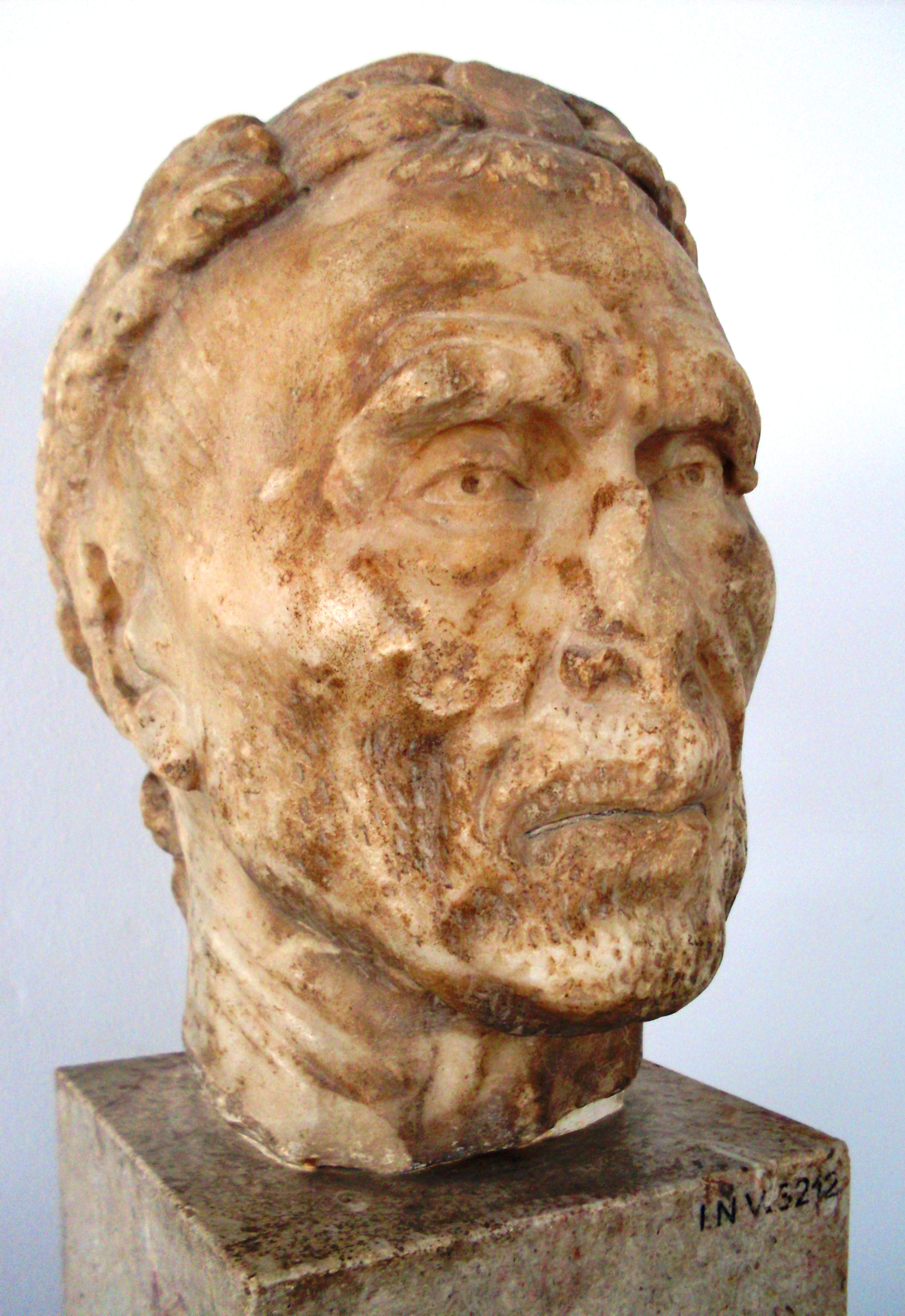
Bust of an emperor in the Bardo National Museum (Tunis) labeled as Gordian I. Some authors call him Decius.

During the reign of Alexander Severus, Gordian I (who was by then in his late sixties), after serving his suffect consulship prior to 223, drew lots for the proconsular governorship of the province of Africa Proconsularis which he assumed in 237. However, prior to the commencement of his promagistrature, Maximinus Thrax killed Alexander Severus at Mogontiacum in Germania Inferior and assumed the throne.

Maximinus was not a popular emperor and universal discontent increased due to his oppressive rule. It culminated in a revolt in Africa in 238 (the exact month is unknown). After Maximinus' fiscal curator was murdered in a riot, people turned to Gordian and demanded that he accept the dangerous honor of the imperial throne. Gordian, who was about 80 years according to Herodian, eventually yielded to the popular clamour and assumed both the purple and the cognomen "Africanus".

According to Edward Gibbon:

An iniquitous sentence had been pronounced against some opulent youths of [Africa], the execution of which would have stripped them of far the greater part of their patrimony. (...) A respite of three days, obtained with difficulty from the rapacious treasurer, was employed in collecting from their estates a great number of slaves and peasants blindly devoted to the commands of their lords and armed with the rustic weapons of clubs and axes. The leaders of the conspiracy, as they were admitted to the audience of the procurator, stabbed him with the daggers concealed under their garments, and, by the assistance of their tumultuary train, seized on the little town of Thysdrus, and erected the standard of rebellion against the sovereign of the Roman empire. (...) Gordianus, their proconsul, and the object of their choice [as emperor], refused, with unfeigned reluctance, the dangerous honour, and begged with tears that they should suffer him to terminate in peace a long and innocent life, without staining his feeble age with civil blood. Their menaces compelled him to accept the Imperial purple, his only refuge indeed against the jealous cruelty of Maximin (...).

Due to his advanced age, he insisted that his son be associated with him. A few days later, Gordian entered the city of Carthage with the overwhelming support of the population and local political leaders. Gordian I sent assassins to kill Maximinus' praetorian prefect, Publius Aelius Vitalianus, and the rebellion seemed to be successful. Gordian, in the meantime, had sent an embassy to Rome, under the leadership of Publius Licinius Valerianus, to obtain the Senate's support for his rebellion. The Senate confirmed the new emperor and many of the provinces gladly sided with Gordian. This event is sometimes dated to 2 April, but this is only based on a passage of the Historia Augusta, nowadays considered highly unreliable, that told about an eclipse presaging the imminent fall of the Gordians.

Opposition came from the neighboring province of Numidia. Capelianus, governor of Numidia and a loyal supporter of Maximinus Thrax, held a grudge against Gordian and invaded the African province with the only legion stationed in the region, III Augusta, and other veteran units. Gordian II, at the head of a militia army of untrained soldiers, lost the Battle of Carthage and was killed, and Gordian I killed himself by hanging himself with his belt. The Gordians had ruled only 22 days, the shortest reign of any Roman emperor. (Note: Quintillus is said to have reigned for only 17 days in the year 270. However, modern scholars now believe this is a misreading of a larger number.) Gordian I was also the first emperor to commit suicide since Otho in 69 during the Year of the Four Emperors.

== Legacy ==
Gordian's positive reputation can be attributed to his reportedly amiable character. Both he and his son were said to be fond of literature, even publishing their own voluminous works. While they were strongly interested in intellectual pursuits, they possessed neither the necessary skills nor resources to be considered able statesmen or powerful rulers. Having embraced the cause of Gordian, the Senate was obliged to continue the revolt against Maximinus following Gordian's death, appointing Pupienus and Balbinus as joint emperors. Nevertheless, by the end of 238, the recognised emperor would be Gordian III, Gordian I's maternal grandson.

== Family tree ==
previous Maximinus Thrax; Emperor; 235–238	Pupienus; Emperor; 238	Gordian I Emperor; 238 ∞ (?) Fabia Orestilla
Balbinus; Emperor; 238	Gordian II co-emperor 238	Maecia Faustina	(doubted); Junius Licinius Balbus consul suffectus	Timesitheus praetorian prefect	next Philip the Arab; Emperor; 244–249
Gordian III; Emperor; 238	Tranquillina	Philip II co-emperor 247–249

== Sources ==
=== Ancient sources ===
- Herodian, Roman History, Book 7
- Historia Augusta, The Three Gordians
- Aurelius Victor, Epitome de Caesaribus
- Joannes Zonaras, Compendium of History extract: Zonaras: Alexander Severus to Diocletian: 222–284
- Zosimus, Historia Nova

=== Modern sources ===
- Birley, Anthony (2005), The Roman Government in Britain, Oxford University Press, ISBN 978-0-19-925237-4
- Gibbon, Edward, Decline and Fall of the Roman Empire (1888)
- Grasby, K.D. (1975). "The Age, Ancestry, and Career of Gordian I". Classical Quarterly. 25 (1): 123–130. doi:10.1017/S000983880003295X. JSTOR 638250. S2CID 170082548.
- Meckler, David Stone (2001). "Gordian I (238 A.D.)". De Imperatoribus Romanis.
- Potter, David Stone, The Roman Empire at Bay, AD 180–395, Routledge, 2004
- Southern, Pat (2015) [2001]. The Roman Empire from Severus to Constantine (2nd ed.). London: Routledge. ISBN 978-0-415-73807-1.
- Syme, Ronald, Emperors and Biography, Oxford University Press, 1971

Regnal titles
Preceded by Maximinus Thrax	Roman emperor 238; With: Gordian II	Succeeded by Pupienus; Balbinus
