= Quartinus =

Usurper of the Roman Empire (died 235 AD)

- Usurper of the Roman Empire
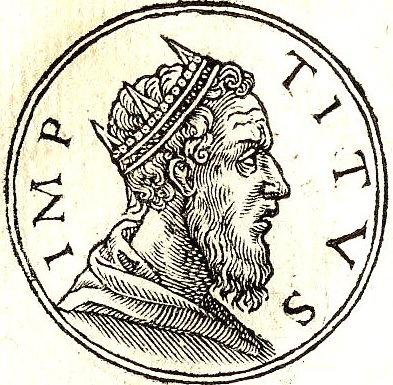
- Reign: 235 AD, against Maximinus Thrax
- Predecessor: Maximinus Thrax
- Successor: Maximinus Thrax
- Died: 235 AD; Mesopotamia
Names
- Titus Quartinus
Regnal name
- Imperator Caesar Titus Quartinus Augustus

Titius Quartinus (died 235 AD) was a Roman usurper.

After the death of Alexander Severus and the usurpation of Maximinus Thrax, a unit of archers from Osrhoene in Mesopotamia, proclaimed Quartinus emperor, a former provincial governor and friend of emperor Alexander Severus, purportedly against his own will. Those archers were led by Macedo and claimed to want revenge for Alexander's death. Quartinus himself was dismissed from the army by Maximinus after Alexander's death.

But later, Macedo betrayed Quartinus, killed him, and presented his head to Maximinus. Maximinus had Macedo executed nevertheless.

Quartinus story was written down by historian Herodianus. No other independent source mentions him, however, and thus some scholars believe Quartinus is purely an invention of Herodianus.

== Sources ==
- Herodianus, History of the Roman Empire, 7,1,9-10
