= Aspasius of Ravenna =

3rd century Roman sophist and rhetorician

Aspasius of Ravenna (/æˈspeɪʒiəs, æˈspeɪziəs, æˈspeɪʒəs/; fl. 3rd century AD) was a Roman sophist and rhetorician from Ravenna. He was the son or pupil of the rhetorician Demetrianus, taught rhetoric in Rome and filled the chair of rhetoric founded by Vespasian before becoming secretary to the emperor Maximinus Thrax. His orations, once praised for their style, are lost.
