= Gordian II =

Roman emperor in 238

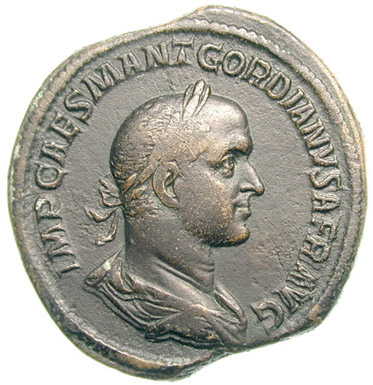
- Sestertius featuring Gordian II. The inscription reads imp caes m ant gordianvs afr avg.

Roman emperor
- Reign: c. March – April 238
- Predecessor: Maximinus Thrax
- Successor: Pupienus and Balbinus
- Co-emperor: Gordian I
- Born: c. 192
- Died: April 238 (aged c. 46); Carthage, Africa Proconsularis
Names
- Marcus Antonius Gordianus
Regnal name
- Imperator Caesar Marcus Antonius Gordianus Sempronianus Romanus Africanus Augustus
- Dynasty: Gordian
- Father: Gordian I
- Mother: Unknown, possibly Fabia Orestilla.

Gordian II (Latin: Marcus Antonius Gordianus Sempronianus Romanus; c. 192 – April 238) was briefly Roman emperor in 238 with his father Gordian I, during the Year of the Six Emperors. Seeking to overthrow Maximinus Thrax, he died in battle outside Carthage. Since he died before his father, Gordian II had the shortest recorded reign of any Roman emperor, at about 22 days.

== Early life ==
Born c. 192, Gordian II was the only known son of Gordian I, who was said to be related to prominent senators. His praenomen and nomen Marcus Antonius suggest that his paternal ancestors received Roman citizenship under the triumvir Mark Antony, or one of his daughters, during the late Roman Republic. Gordian's cognomen "Gordianus" suggests that his family origins were from Anatolia, especially Galatia and Cappadocia.

According to the notoriously unreliable Historia Augusta, his mother was a Roman woman called Fabia Orestilla, born circa 165, who the Historia claims was a descendant of emperors Antoninus Pius and Marcus Aurelius through her father Fulvus Antoninus. Modern historians have dismissed this name and her information as false. There is some evidence to suggest that Gordian's mother might have been the granddaughter of the Greek Sophist, consul and tutor Herodes Atticus. His younger sister was Maecia Faustina, who was the mother of Emperor Gordian III.

Although the memory of the Gordians would have been cherished by the Senate and thus appear sympathetic in any senatorial documentation of the period, the only account of Gordian's early career that has survived is contained within the Historia Augusta, and it cannot be taken as an accurate or reliable description of his life story prior to his elevation to the purple in 238. According to this source, Gordian served as quaestor in Elagabalus' reign and as praetor and consul suffect with Emperor Severus Alexander. In 237 or 238, Gordian went to the province of Africa Proconsularis as a legatus under his father, who served as proconsular governor.

== Revolt against Maximinus Thrax ==
Early in 235, Emperor Alexander Severus and his mother Julia Avita Mamaea were assassinated by mutinous troops at Moguntiacum (now Mainz) in Germania Inferior. The leader of the rebellion, Maximinus Thrax, became Emperor, despite his low-born background and the disapproval of the Roman Senate. Confronted by a local elite that had just killed Maximinus's procurator, Gordian's father was forced to participate in a full-scale revolt against Maximinus in 238, probably at the end of March. Due to Gordian I's advanced age, the younger Gordian, said to be 46 years old, was attached to the imperial throne and acclaimed augustus too. Like his father, he too was awarded the cognomen "Africanus".

Father and son saw their claim to the throne ratified both by the Senate and most of the other provinces, due to Maximinus' unpopularity.

Opposition would come from the neighbouring province of Numidia. Capelianus, governor of Numidia, a loyal supporter of Maximinus Thrax, and who held a grudge against Gordian, renewed his allegiance to the reigning emperor and invaded Africa (province) with the only legion stationed in the region, III Augusta, and other veteran units. Gordian II, at the head of a militia army of untrained soldiers, lost the Battle of Carthage and was killed. According to the Historia Augusta, his body was never recovered. Hearing the news, his father killed himself. The Gordians ruled only 22 days. This first rebellion against Maximinus Thrax was unsuccessful, but by the end of 238 Gordian II's nephew, Gordian III, would be recognised as emperor by the whole Roman world.

According to Edward Gibbon, in the first volume of The History of the Decline and Fall of the Roman Empire (1776–1789), "Twenty-two acknowledged concubines, and a library of sixty-two thousand volumes, attested to the variety of [Gordian's] inclinations; and from the productions that he left behind him, it appears that the former as well as the latter were designed for use rather than ostentation." In a footnote to that sentence, Gibbon goes on to say that Gordian had three or four children by each concubine.

== Family tree ==
GORDIAN DYNASTY family tree

previous Maximinus Thrax; Roman Emperor; 235–238 | Pupienus; Roman Emperor; 238 | Gordian I Roman Emperor; 238 ∞ (?) Fabia Orestilla | Nerva-Antonine Dynasty, perhaps? (For Gordian I,the connection is through his probable wife, Fabia Orestilla)
Balbinus; Roman Emperor; 238 | Gordian II co-emperor 238 | Maecia Faustina (called by modern historians as Antonia Gordiana) | (doubted); Junius Licinius Balbus consul suffectus | Gaius Furius Sabinius Aquila Timesitheus praetorian prefect | next Philip the Arab; Roman Emperor; 244–249
Claudius II Gothicus (perhaps, although disputed, if so, his brother Quintillus became the next emperor and is also a member of the Gordianic dynasty); Roman Emperor; 268–270 | Gordian III; Roman Emperor; 238-244 | Furia Sabinia Tranquillina | Philip II; Roman Emperor co-emperor 247–249
CONSTANTINIAN DYNASTY, probably spurious
(see Family tree of Byzantine emperors)

== See also ==
- Villa Gordiani

== Sources ==
=== Primary sources ===
- Aurelius Victor, Epitome de Caesaribus
- Herodian, Roman History, Book 7
- Historia Augusta, The Three Gordians
- Joannes Zonaras, Compendium of History
- Zosimus, Historia Nova

=== Secondary sources ===
- Birley, Anthony (2005). The Roman Government in Britain. Oxford University Press. ISBN 978-0-19-925237-4.
- Gibbon, Edward (1888). The History of the Decline and Fall of the Roman Empire
- Meckler, David Stone (2001). "Gordian II (238 A.D.)". De Imperatoribus Romanis.
- Potter, David Stone (2004). The Roman Empire at Bay, AD 180–395. Routledge.
- Southern, Pat (2015) [2001]. The Roman Empire from Severus to Constantine (2nd ed.). London: Routledge. ISBN 978-0-415-73807-1.
- Syme, Ronald (1971). Emperors and Biography. Oxford University Press.

Regnal titles
| Preceded by Maximinus Thrax | Roman emperor 238; With: Gordian I | Succeeded by Pupienus; Balbinus |
