= Tiberius Claudius Pompeianus Quintianus =

Roman senator, consul and soldier (170–212/217)

Tiberius Claudius Pompeianus Quintianus (170 – between 212 and 217) was the son of Syrian Roman Consul Tiberius Claudius Pompeianus.

During the reign of Roman Emperor Caracalla (211–217), Pompeianus was put in charge of the Roman military campaigns and awarded two consulships, one as a Suffectus in 212. However, he appears to have been murdered during a robbery.

== Sources ==
- https://web.archive.org/web/20071007063958/http://www.ancientlibrary.com/smith-bio/2806.html

Political offices
| Preceded by Gaius Julius Asper, and Gaius Julius Camilius Asper | Consul of the Roman Empire; 212 with Gaius Julius Camilius Asper | Succeeded by Caracalla, and Balbinus |
