= Balbinus =

Roman emperor in 238

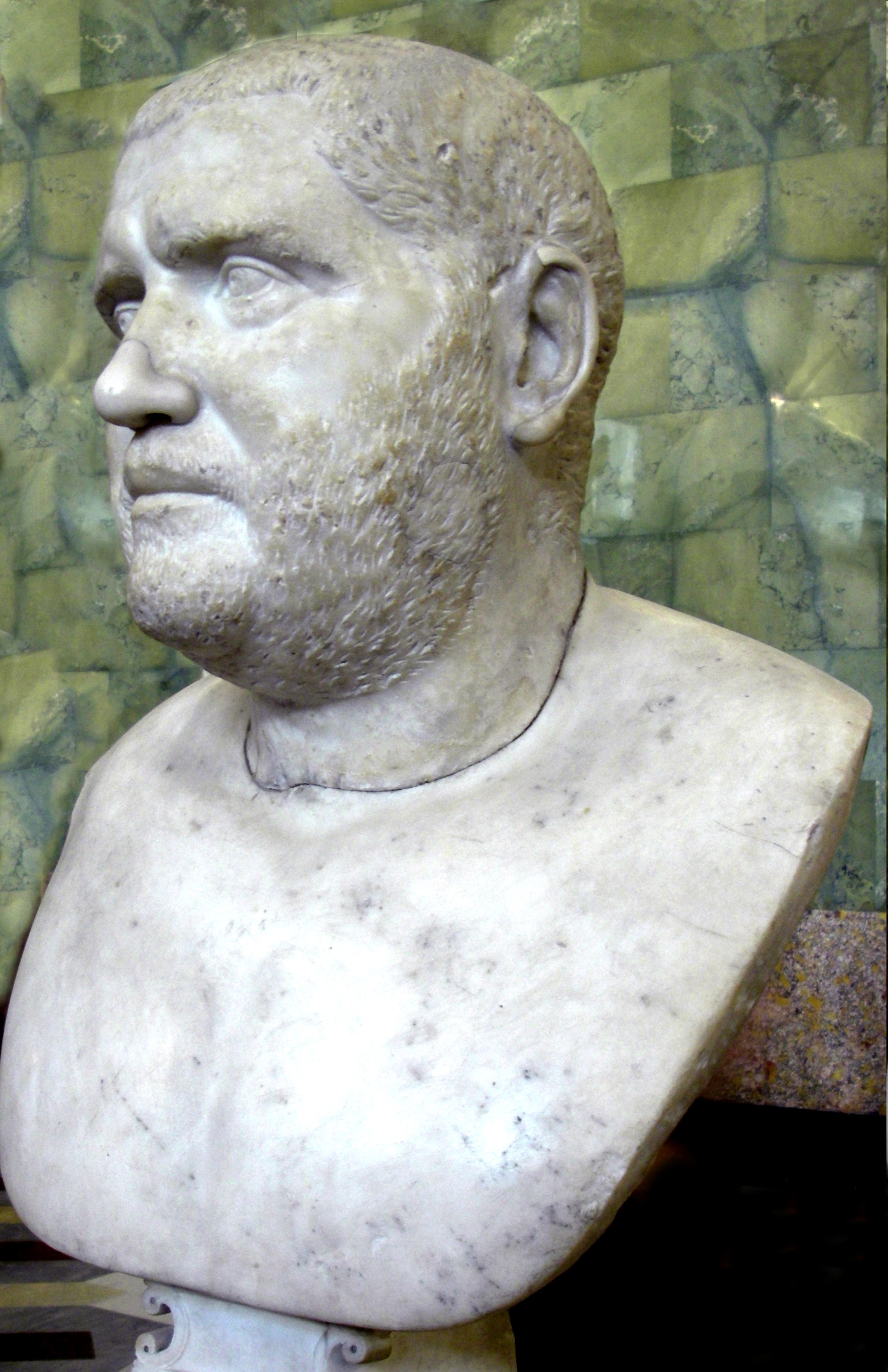
- Bust, Hermitage Museum

Roman emperor
- Reign: April/May – July/August 238
- Predecessor: Gordian I and II
- Successor: Gordian III
- Co-emperor: Pupienus
- Rival: Maximinus (until June)
- Born: c. 178
- Died: July/August 238 (aged approx. 60); Rome, Italy
Names
- Decimus Caelius Calvinus Balbinus
Regnal name
- Imperator Caesar Decimus Caelius Calvinus Balbinus Pius Augustus

Balbinus (Latin: Decimus Caelius Calvinus Balbinus; c. 178 – July/August 238 AD) was Roman emperor with Pupienus for three months in 238, the Year of the Six Emperors.

== Origins and career ==
Not much is known about Balbinus before his elevation to emperor. It has been conjectured that he descended from Publius Coelius Balbinus Vibullius Pius, the consul ordinarius of 137, and wife Aquilia. If this were true, he was also related to the family of Q. Pompeius Falco, which supplied many politicians of consular rank throughout the 3rd century, and to the 1st-century politician, engineer and author Julius Frontinus. He was born around 178. He was a patrician from birth, and was the son (either by birth or adoption) of Caelius Calvinus, who was legate of Cappadocia in 184. He was one of the Salii priests of Mars. According to Herodian he had governed provinces, but the list of seven provinces given in the unreliable Historia Augusta, as well as the statement that Balbinus had been both Proconsul of Asia and of Africa, are likely to be mere invention. He had certainly been twice consul; his first consulate is not certainly known but is believed to have been about 203 or in July 211; he was consul for the second time in 213 as colleague of Caracalla, which suggests he enjoyed that emperor's favour.

== Reign ==
According to Edward Gibbon (drawing upon the narratives of Herodian and the Historia Augusta):

Balbinus was an admired orator, a poet of distinguished fame, and a wise magistrate, who had exercised with innocence and applause the civil jurisdiction in almost all the interior provinces of the empire. His birth was noble, his fortune affluent, his manners liberal and affable. In him, the love of pleasure was corrected by a sense of dignity, nor had the habits of ease deprived him of a capacity for business. ... The two colleagues [Pupienus and Balbinus] had both been consul (Balbinus had twice enjoyed that honourable office), both had been named among the twenty lieutenants of the senate; and, since the one was sixty and the other seventy-four years old, they had both attained the full maturity of age and experience.

On the news of the Gordians' defeat, the Senate voted Pupienus and Balbinus as co-emperors in April 238, though they were soon forced to co-opt the child Gordian III as a colleague. Unlike the situation in 161, both emperors were elected as pontifices maximi, chief priests of the official cults. This would be unthinkable in Republican times. Balbinus was probably in his early sixties: his qualifications for rule are unknown, except presumably that he was a senior senator, rich and well-connected. While Pupienus marched to Ravenna, where he oversaw the campaign against Maximinus, Balbinus remained in Rome, but failed to keep public order. The sources suggest that after Pupienus's victorious return following Maximinus' death, Balbinus and Pupienus began to distrust each other. They were soon assassinated by disaffected elements of the Praetorian Guard; Pupienus attempted to warn Balbinus of the plot, but the latter thought that the guard would instead secure the throne for himself.

Minting of the antoninianus was ended by Elagabalus in 219, but restarted under Balbinus and Pupienus.

== Sarcophagus ==
The 'sarcophagus of Balbinus' has earned this Emperor a niche in the history of Roman Imperial art. Presumably while holding the title of Emperor, Balbinus had a marble sarcophagus made for himself and his wife (whose name is unknown). Discovered in fragments near the Via Appia and restored, this is the only example of a Roman Imperial sarcophagus of this type to have survived. On the lid are reclining figures of Balbinus and his wife, the figure of the Emperor also being a fine portrait of him. The sarcophagus is held in collection at the Museo di Pretastato (at the catacombs of Praetextatus) in the Park of the Caffarella near the Appian Way at Rome.

Although in accounts of their joint reign Balbinus is emphasized as the civilian as against Pupienus the military man, on the side of the sarcophagus he is portrayed in full military dress.

== Family tree ==
Maximinus Thrax; Roman Emperor; 235–238	Gordian I Roman Emperor; 238	Pupienus; Roman Emperor; 238	Philip the Arab; Roman Emperor; 244–249
Gaius Julius Verus Maximus caesar	Gordian II co-emperor 238	Maecia Faustina	Balbinus; Roman Emperor; 238	Philip II co-emperor 247–249
Gordian III; Roman Emperor; 238–244

== Gallery ==
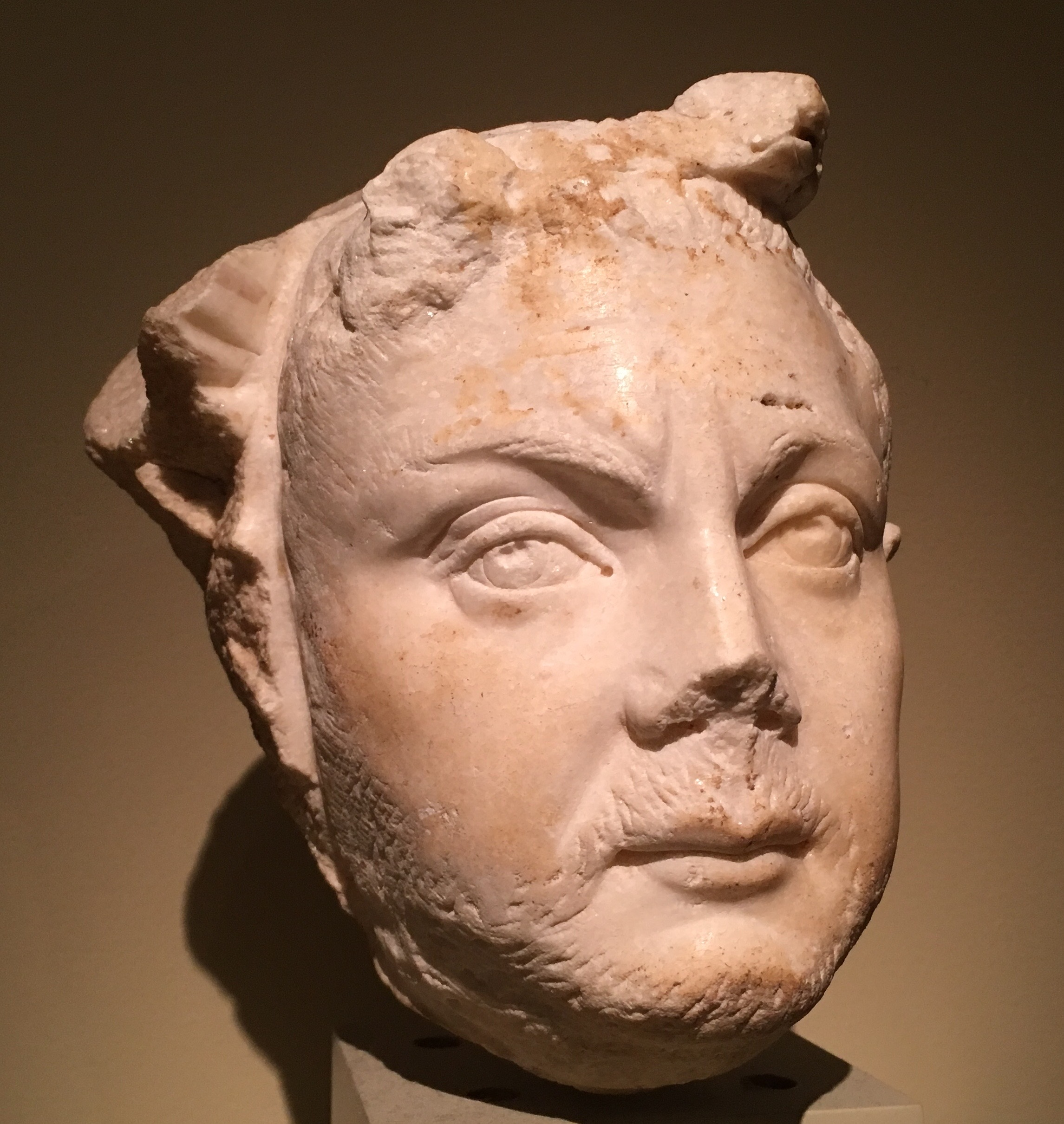
Portrait of the Roman Emperor Balbinus, dated AD 200–300, from the collection of the Cleveland Museum of Art.

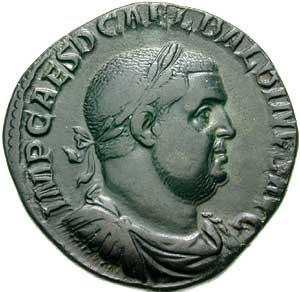
Sestertius of Balbinus. Inscription: IMP. CAES. D. CAEL. BALBINVS AVG.

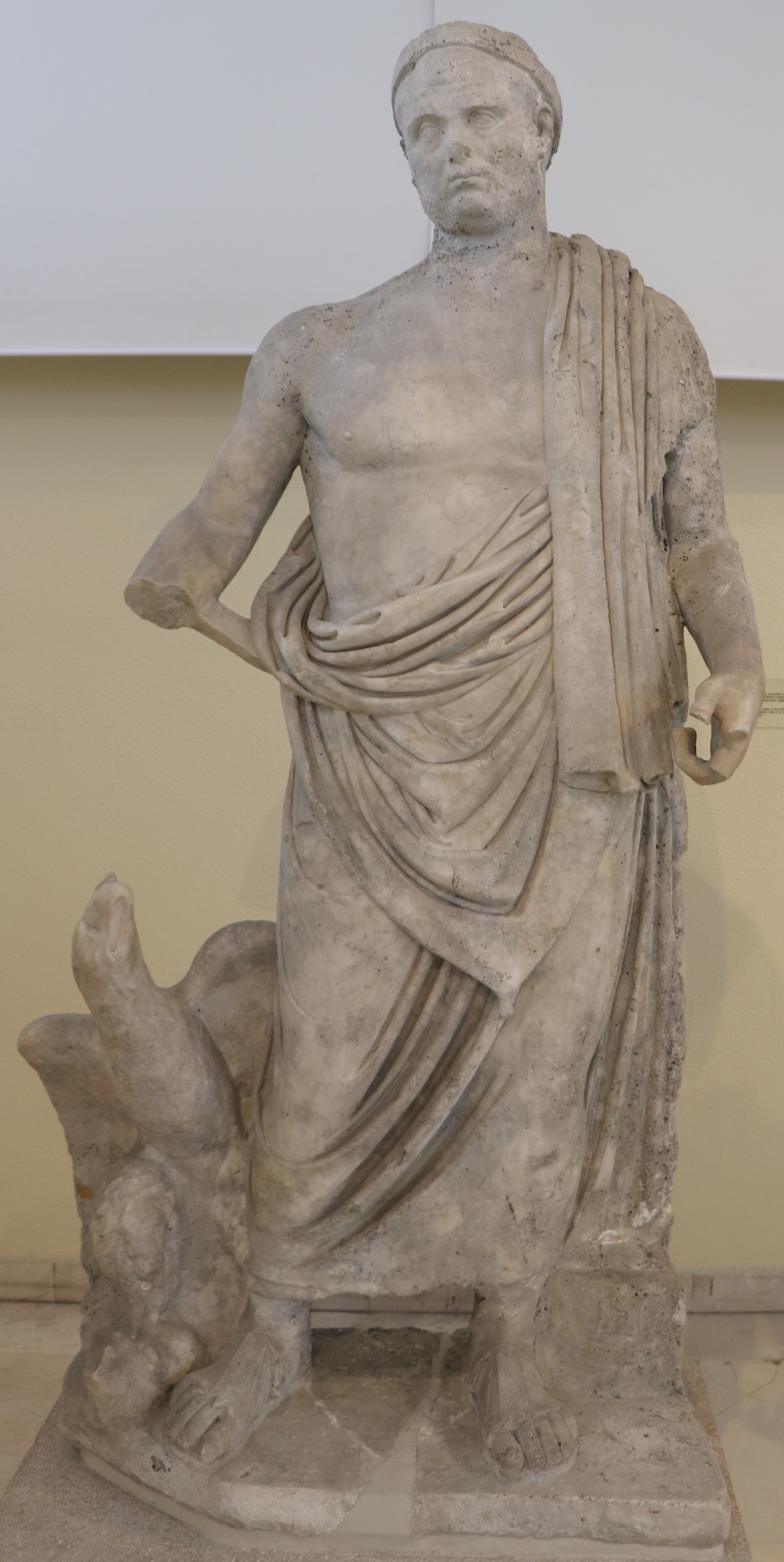
Statue of Balbinus, Archaeological Museum of Piraeus, Greece.

== Works cited ==
- Bowman, Alan; Cameron, Averil; Garnsey, Peter, eds. (2008). The Cambridge Ancient History: The Crisis of Empire, AD 193-337. Vol. 12 (2 ed.). Cambridge University Press. ISBN 9781139053921.

Regnal titles
Preceded by Gordian I, Gordian II; Maximinus Thrax	Roman emperor 238; With: Pupienus	Succeeded by Gordian III
Political offices
Preceded by (Gn. Claudius ?) Severanus (Tib. Claudius ?) Pompeianus	Roman consul 213 with Caracalla	Succeeded by L. Valerius Messalla Apollinaris; C. Octavius Appius Suetrius Sabinus
