= Maximinus Thrax =

Roman emperor from 235 to 238

Maximinus I Thrax
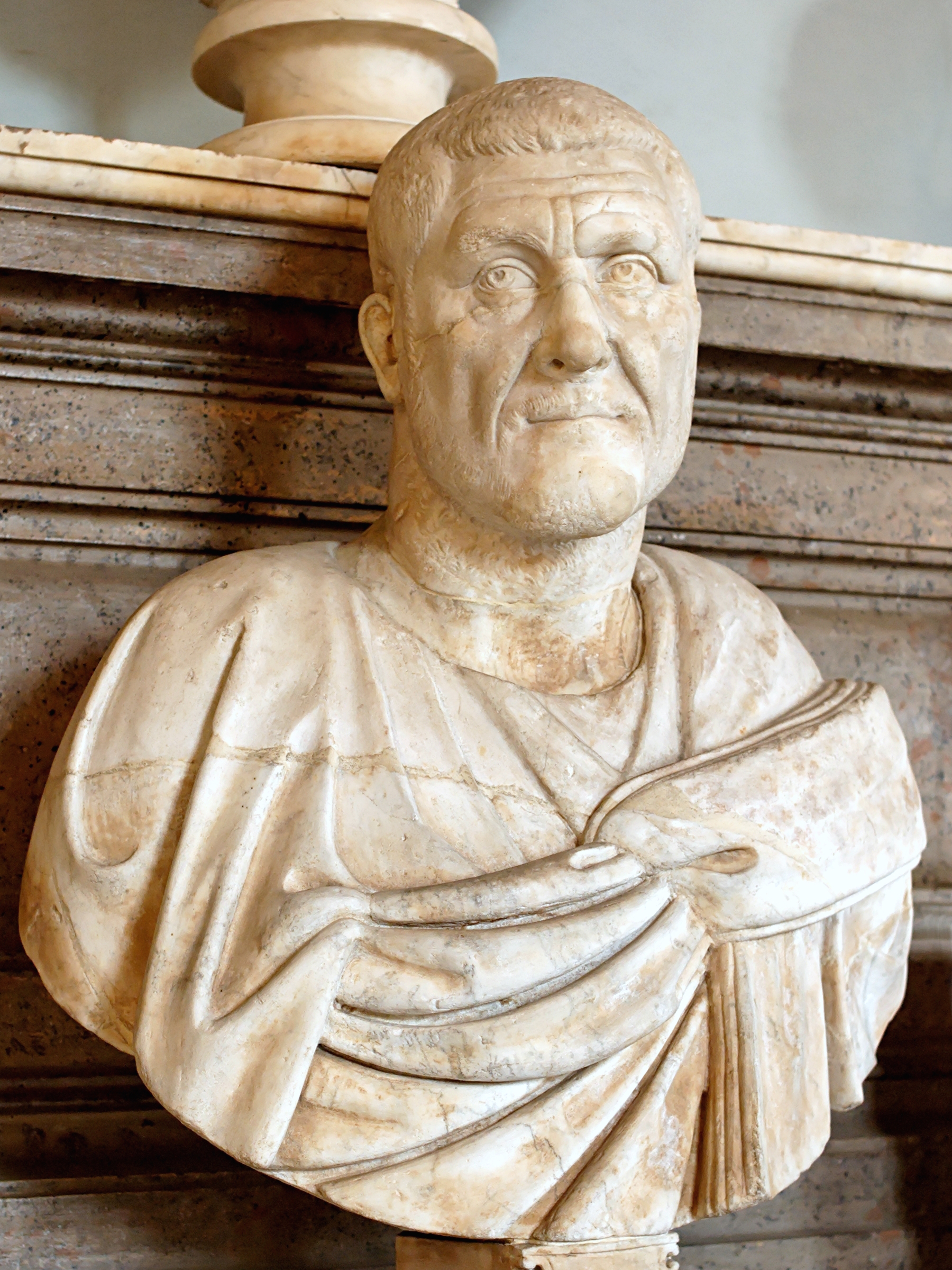
- Bust, Capitoline Museums, Rome

Roman emperor
- Reign: March 235 – c. June 238 (Note: His death is sometimes dated to 24 June. This is based on the "3 years 4 months 2 days" reign-length given by the Chronograph of 354. Some interpret this as "3 years 3 months 2 days", which gives 24 June reckoning from 22 March 235, the supposed date of Alexander's death (the exact date is disputed). Maximinus's official dies imperii (day of accession) was almost certainly 23 March, but the figures of the Chronograph can not be trusted as they are often corrupted, inaccurate or made-up. Papyri show that the Gordians were recognized in Egypt between 7 April and 13 June. Maximinus is not mentioned again, as he was declared an enemy by the Senate. Peachin argues that he died in early June, but all we know is that he died during the reign of Pupienus and Balbinus, between May and August according to papyri.)
- Predecessor: Severus Alexander
- Successors: Pupienus and Balbinus
- Rivals: Gordian I, Gordian II, Pupienus, and Balbinus
- Caesar: Maximus (236 – May 238)
- Born: c. 173; Thracia
- Died: c. June 238 (aged ~65); Aquileia, Italy
- Spouse: Caecilia Paulina
- Issue: Gaius Julius Verus Maximus
Names
- Gaius Julius Verus Maximinus
Regnal name
- Imperator Caesar Gaius Julius Verus Maximinus Augustus
- Father: Unknown, possibly Micca
- Mother: Unknown, possibly Ababa

Maximinus I (Latin: Gaius Julius Verus Maximinus; c. 173 – 238), commonly called Maximinus Thrax, was Roman emperor from 235 to 238. Of Thracian origin – given the nickname Thrax ('the Thracian') – he rose up through the military ranks, ultimately holding high command in the army of the Rhine under Emperor Severus Alexander. After Severus was murdered in 235, Maximinus was proclaimed emperor by the army, beginning the Crisis of the Third Century, a 50-year period of instability and civil war. He is often remembered for his unusual height, although the veracity of this is disputed.

Maximinus was the commander of the Legio IV Italica when Severus Alexander was assassinated by his own troops in 235. The Pannonian army then elected Maximinus emperor. In 238 (which came to be known as the Year of the Six Emperors), a senatorial revolt broke out, leading to the successive proclamation of Gordian I, Gordian II, Pupienus, Balbinus, and Gordian III as emperors in opposition to Maximinus. Maximinus advanced on Rome to put down the revolt, but was halted at Aquileia, where he was assassinated by disaffected elements of the Legio II Parthica.

Maximinus is described by several ancient sources, though only Herodian's Roman History is contemporary. He was a so-called barracks emperor of the 3rd century; his rule is often considered to mark the beginning of the Crisis of the Third Century. Maximinus was the first emperor who hailed neither from the senatorial class nor from the equestrian class.

== Background ==
The names "Gaius Julius" suggest that his family acquired Roman citizenship during the reign of the Julio-Claudian dynasty, as freedmen and newly integrated Romans always adopted the names of their former masters. His exact birth date is unknown, but the Chronicon Paschale and the epitome of Joannes Zonaras, both written centuries later, record that he died at the age of 65, implying a birth in 173.

Herodian writes that Maximinus was of Thraco-Roman origin. According to the notoriously unreliable Historia Augusta, he was born in Thrace or Moesia to a Gothic father and an Alanic mother; however, the supposed parentage is a highly unlikely anachronism, as the Goths are known to have moved to Thracia from a different place of origin much later in history and their residence in the Danubian area is not otherwise attested until after Maximinus' death. British historian Ronald Syme, writing that "the word 'Gothia' should have sufficed for condemnation" of the passage in the Historia Augusta, felt that the burden of evidence from Herodian, Syncellus and elsewhere pointed to Maximinus having been born in Moesia Superior or Moesia Inferior.

The references to his "Gothic" ancestry might refer to a Thracian Getic origin (the two populations were often confused by later writers, most notably by Jordanes in his Getica), as suggested by the paragraphs describing how "he was singularly beloved by the Getae, moreover, as if he were one of themselves" and how he spoke "almost pure Thracian". On the contrary, Bernard Bachrach suggests that the Historia Augusta's use of a term not used in Maximinus time – "Gothia" – is hardly sufficient cause to dismiss its account. After all, the names it gives for Maximinus' parents are legitimate Alan and Gothic appellations. Hence, Bachrach argues, the most straightforward explanation is that the author of the Historia Augusta relied on a legitimate third century source, but substituted its terminology for that current in his own day. Accordingly, Maximinus' ancestry remains an open question.

His background was, in any case, that of a provincial of low birth, and he was seen by the Senate as a barbarian, not even a true Roman, despite Caracalla’s edict granting citizenship to all freeborn inhabitants of the Empire. According to the Augustan History, he was a shepherd and bandit leader before joining the Imperial Roman army, causing historian Brent Shaw to comment that a man who would have been "in other circumstances a Godfather, [...] became emperor of Rome." In many ways, Maximinus was similar to the later Thraco-Roman emperors of the 3rd–5th century (Aureolus, Galerius, Licinius, Leo I, etc.), elevating themselves, via a military career, from the condition of a common soldier in one of the Roman legions to the foremost positions of political power. He joined the army during the reign of Septimius Severus.

Maximinus was in command of Legio IV Italica, composed of recruits from Pannonia (Pannonia Superior or Pannonia Inferior), who were angered by Alexander's payments to the Alemanni and his avoidance of war. The troops, who included the Legio XXII Primigenia, elected Maximinus, killing Alexander and his mother at Moguntiacum (modern Mainz). The Praetorian Guard acclaimed him emperor, and their choice was grudgingly confirmed by the Senate, who were displeased to have a peasant as emperor. His son Maximus became caesar.

== Rule ==
=== Consolidation of power ===
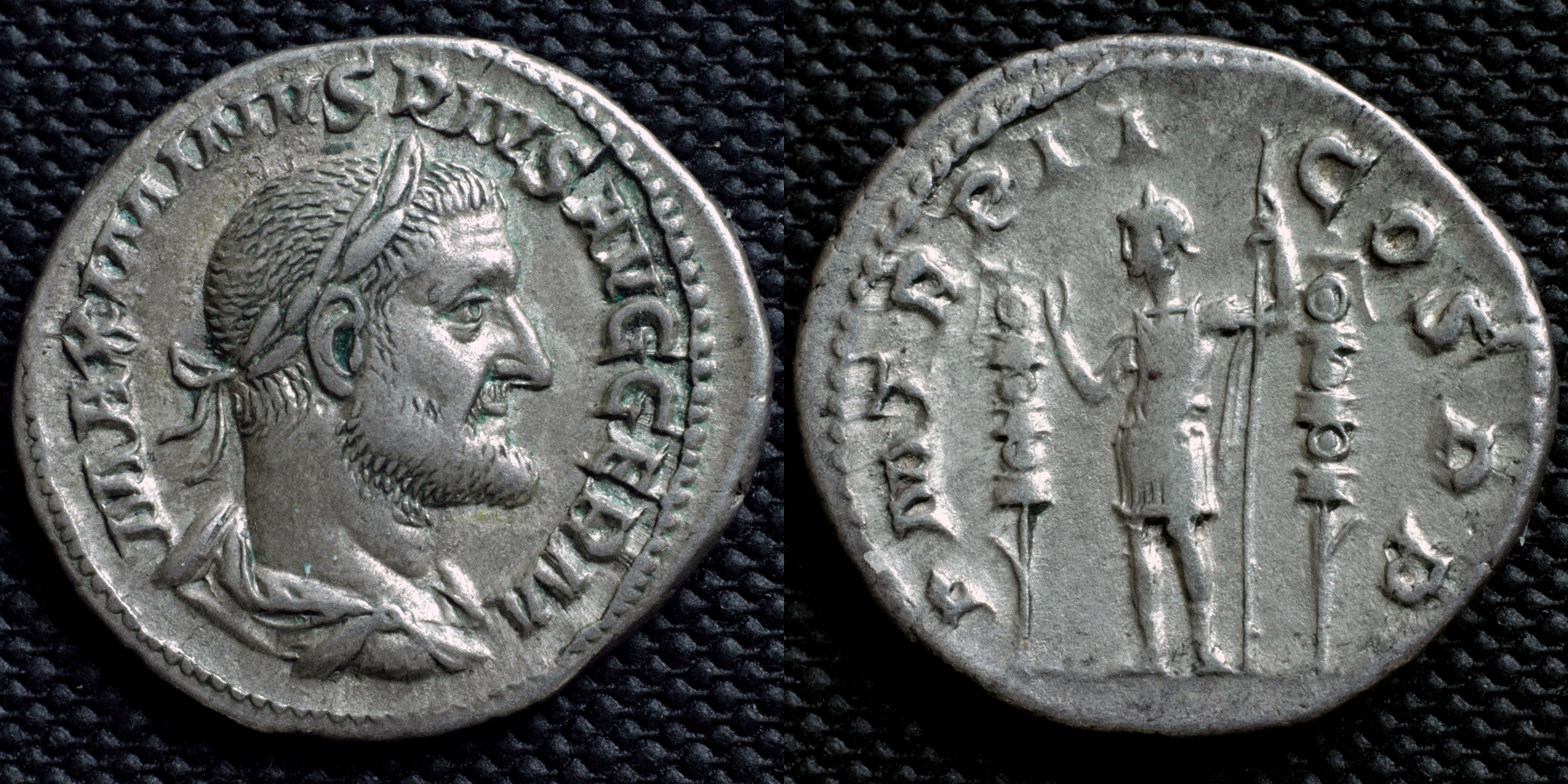

First side of the image: O: laureate draped and cuirassed bust of Maximinus MAXIMINVS PIVS AVG GERM
Second side of the image: R: Maximinus holding sceptre; standard on either side P M TR P II COS P P
Silver denarius struck in Rome from February to December 236 AD; ref.: RIC 4

Maximinus began his rule by eliminating the close advisors of Alexander. His suspicions may have been justified; two plots against Maximinus were foiled. The first was during a campaign across the Rhine, when a group of officers, supported by influential senators, plotted to destroy a bridge across the river, in order to strand Maximinus in hostile territory. They planned to elect senator Magnus emperor afterwards, but the conspiracy was discovered and the conspirators executed. The second plot involved Mesopotamian archers who were loyal to Alexander. They planned to elevate Quartinus, but their leader Macedo changed sides and murdered Quartinus instead, although this was not enough to save his own life.

=== Defense of frontiers ===
The accession of Maximinus is commonly seen as the beginning of the Crisis of the Third Century (also known as the "Military Anarchy" or the "Imperial Crisis"), the commonly applied name for the crumbling and near collapse of the Roman Empire between 235 and 284 caused by various simultaneous crises.

Maximinus's first campaign was against the Alemanni, whom he defeated despite heavy Roman casualties in a swamp in the Agri Decumates. After the victory, Maximinus took the title Germanicus Maximus, raised his son Maximus to the rank of caesar and princeps iuventutis, and deified his late wife Paulina. Maximinus may have launched a second campaign deep into Germania, defeating a Germanic tribe beyond the Weser in the Battle at the Harzhorn. Securing the German frontier, at least for a while, Maximinus then set up a winter encampment at Sirmium in Pannonia, and from that supply base fought the Dacians and the Sarmatians during the winter of 235–236.

=== Infrastructure work ===
In 2019 Israeli researchers translated a milestone found in the Moshav Ramot village in the Golan Heights. They were able to identify the name of Maximinus on the milestone. The roads themselves were much older, suggesting that a renovation project was undertaken during his rule on those roads.

=== Gordian I and Gordian II ===
Early in 238, in the province of Africa, a full-scale revolt broke out. The landowners armed their clients and their agricultural workers and entered Thysdrus (modern El Djem), where they murdered the offending official and his bodyguards and proclaimed the aged governor of the province, Marcus Antonius Gordianus Sempronianus (Gordian I), and his son, Gordian II, as co-emperors. The Senate in Rome switched allegiance, gave both Gordian and Gordian II the title of Augustus, and set about rousing the provinces in support of the pair. Maximinus, wintering at Sirmium, immediately assembled his army and advanced on Rome, the Pannonian legions leading the way.

Meanwhile, in Africa, the revolt had not gone as planned. The province of Africa was bordered on the west by the province of Numidia, whose governor, Capelianus, nursed a long-standing grudge against the Gordians and controlled the only legionary unit (III Augusta) in the area. Gordian II was killed in the fighting and, on hearing this, Gordian I hanged himself with his belt.

=== Pupienus, Balbinus, and Gordian III ===
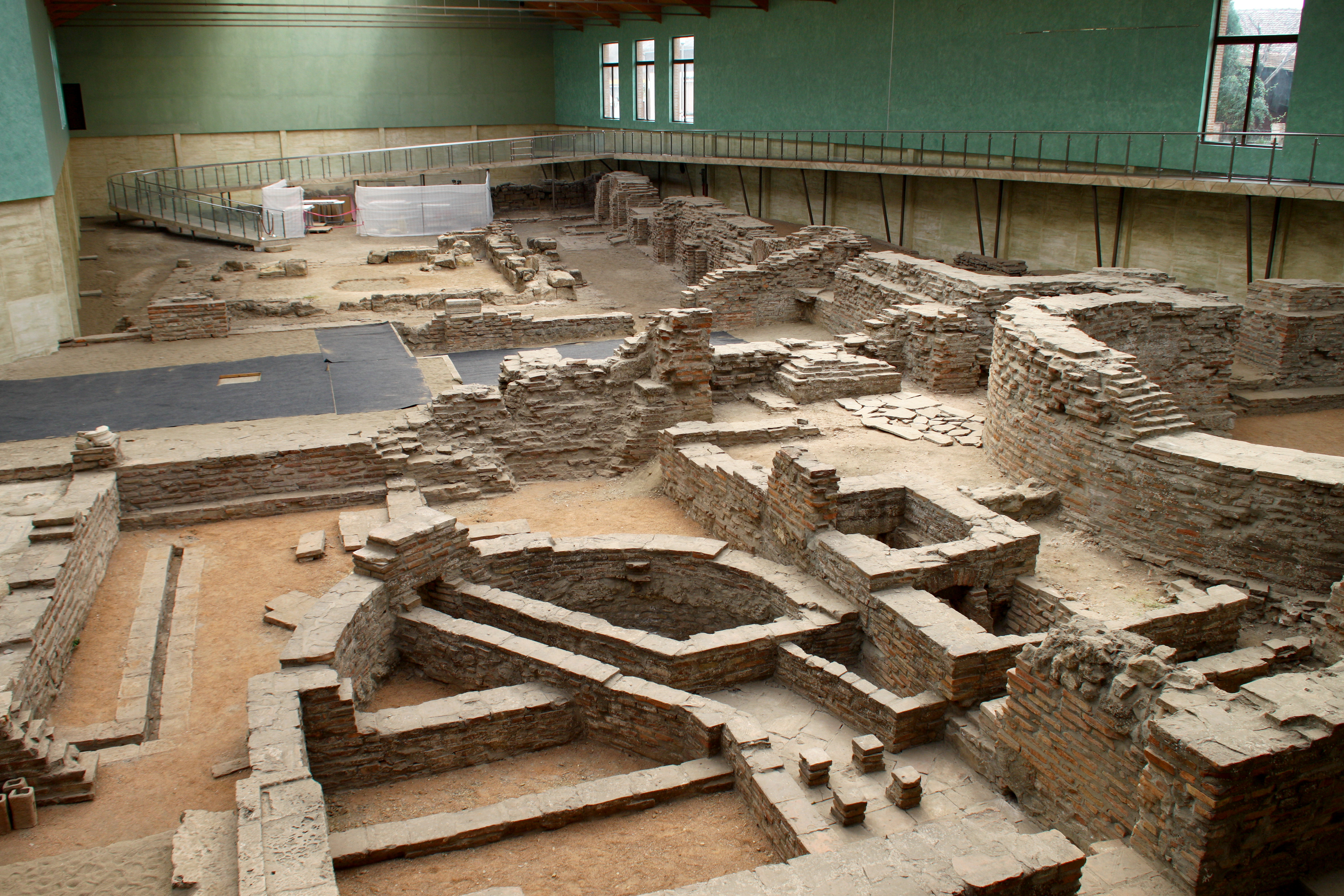
Ruins of Imperial Palace at Sirmium, today in Sremska Mitrovica

When the African revolt collapsed, the Senate found itself in great jeopardy. Having shown clear support for the Gordians, they could expect no clemency from Maximinus when he reached Rome. In this predicament, they remained determined to defy Maximinus and elected two of their number, Pupienus and Balbinus, as co-emperors. When the Roman mob heard that the Senate had selected two men from the patrician class, men whom the ordinary people held in no great regard, they protested, showering the imperial cortège with sticks and stones. A faction in Rome preferred Gordian's grandson (Gordian III), and there was severe street fighting. The co-emperors had no option but to compromise, and, sending for the grandson of the elder Gordian they appointed him caesar.

=== Defeat and death ===
Maximinus marched on Rome, but Aquileia closed its gates against him. His troops became disaffected during the unexpected siege of the city, at which time they suffered from starvation. In about May or June 238, soldiers of the II Parthica in his camp assassinated him, his son, and his chief ministers.

Pupienus and Balbinus then became undisputed co-emperors. However, they mistrusted each other, and ultimately both were murdered by the Praetorian Guard, making Gordian III sole surviving emperor. Unable to reach Rome, Thrax never visited the capital city during his reign.

== Politics ==
Maximinus doubled the pay of soldiers; this act, along with virtually continuous warfare, required higher taxes. Tax collectors began to resort to violent methods and illegal confiscations, further alienating the governing class from everyone else.

According to early church historian Eusebius of Caesarea, the Imperial household of Maximinus's predecessor, Alexander, had contained many Christians. Eusebius states that, hating his predecessor's household, Maximinus ordered that the leaders of the churches should be put to death. According to Eusebius, this persecution of 235 sent Hippolytus of Rome and Pope Pontian into exile, but other evidence suggests that the persecutions of 235 were local to the provinces where they occurred rather than happening under the direction of the Emperor.

According to Historia Augusta, which modern scholars however treat with extreme caution:

The Romans could bear his barbarities no longer – the way in which he called up informers and incited accusers, invented false offences, killed innocent men, condemned all whoever came to trial, reduced the richest men to utter poverty and never sought money anywhere save in some other's ruin, put many generals and many men of consular rank to death for no offence, carried others about in waggons without food and drink, and kept others in confinement, in short neglected nothing which he thought might prove effectual for cruelty – and, unable to suffer these things longer, they rose against him in revolt.

== Appearance ==
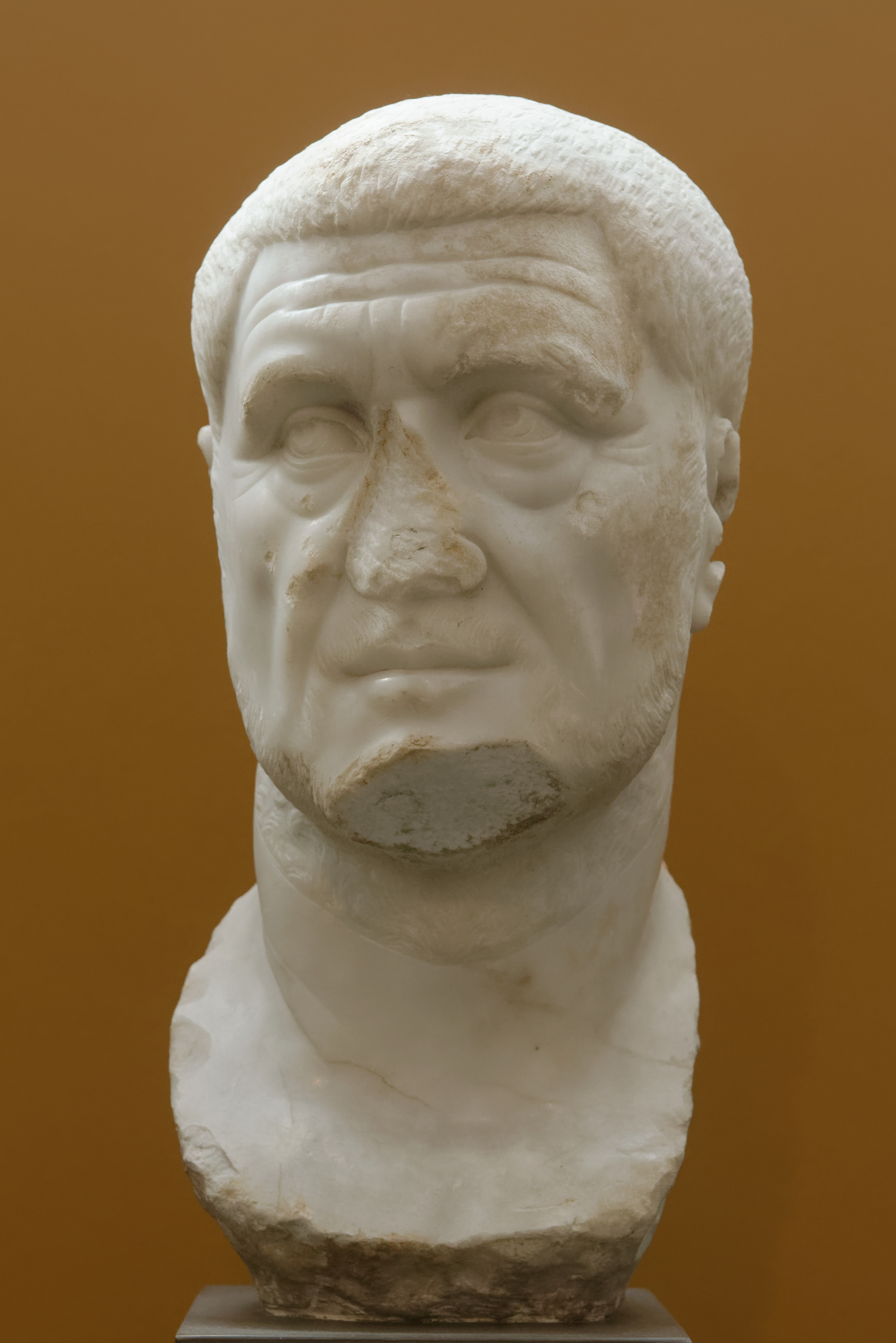
Portrait in the Ny Carlsberg Glyptotek.

Ancient sources, ranging from the unreliable Historia Augusta to accounts of Herodian, speak of Maximinus as a man of significantly greater size than his contemporaries. He is, moreover, depicted in ancient imagery as a man with a prominent brow, nose, and jaw (symptoms of acromegaly).

According to Historia Augusta, "he was of such size, so Cordus reports, that men said he was eight-feet, one finger (c. 2.4 metres) in height". It is very likely however that this is one of the many exaggerations in the Historia Augusta, and is immediately suspect due to its citation of "Cordus", one of several fictitious authorities the work cites.

Although not going into the supposedly detailed portions of Historia Augusta, the historian Herodian, a contemporary of Maximinus, mentions him as a man of greater size, noting that: "He was in any case a man of such frightening appearance and colossal size that there is no obvious comparison to be drawn with any of the best-trained Greek athletes or warrior elite of the barbarians."

Some historians interpret the stories on Maximinus's unusual height (as well as other information on his appearance, like excessive sweating and superhuman strength) as popular stereotyped attributes which do no more than intentionally turn him into a stylized embodiment of the barbarian bandit or emphasize the admiration and aversion that the image of the soldier evoked in the civilian population.

== See also ==
- Aspasius of Ravenna (his secretary as emperor)

== Notes ==
Regnal titles
Preceded by Severus Alexander	Roman emperor 235–238; With: Gordian I, Gordian II, Pupienus and Balbinus (all 238)	Succeeded by Pupienus and Balbinus
Political offices
Preceded by Gnaeus Claudius Severus; Lucius Titus Claudius Quintianus	Roman consul 236 with Marcus Pupienus Africanus Maximus	Succeeded by Lucius Marius Perpetuus; Lucius Mummius Felix Cornelianus
