= Capelianus =

3rd century Roman commander and governor

Capelianus was a Roman governor of the province of Numidia in the 3rd century, and commander of the army that defeated and killed Gordian II in 238, the Year of the Six Emperors.

Herodian writes that he had an existing animosity towards Gordian, on account of an unspecified lawsuit. Gordian, on his acclamation as co-emperor with his father Gordian I, then the governor of the adjoining province of Africa, ordered the replacement of Capelianus. The latter refused to go quietly, however, and took an army to Carthage, where his numerically superior and well-trained forces (Numidia, in contrast to Africa, was well-garrisoned against Berber raids) easily defeated those of Gordian. He then allowed his soldiers free rein to pillage Africa, hoping to maintain their support in the event of an opportunity to make a bid for emperor himself. Such an opportunity presumably never arose, as he disappears from the historical record from that point.
