= Gordian III =

Roman emperor from 238 to 244

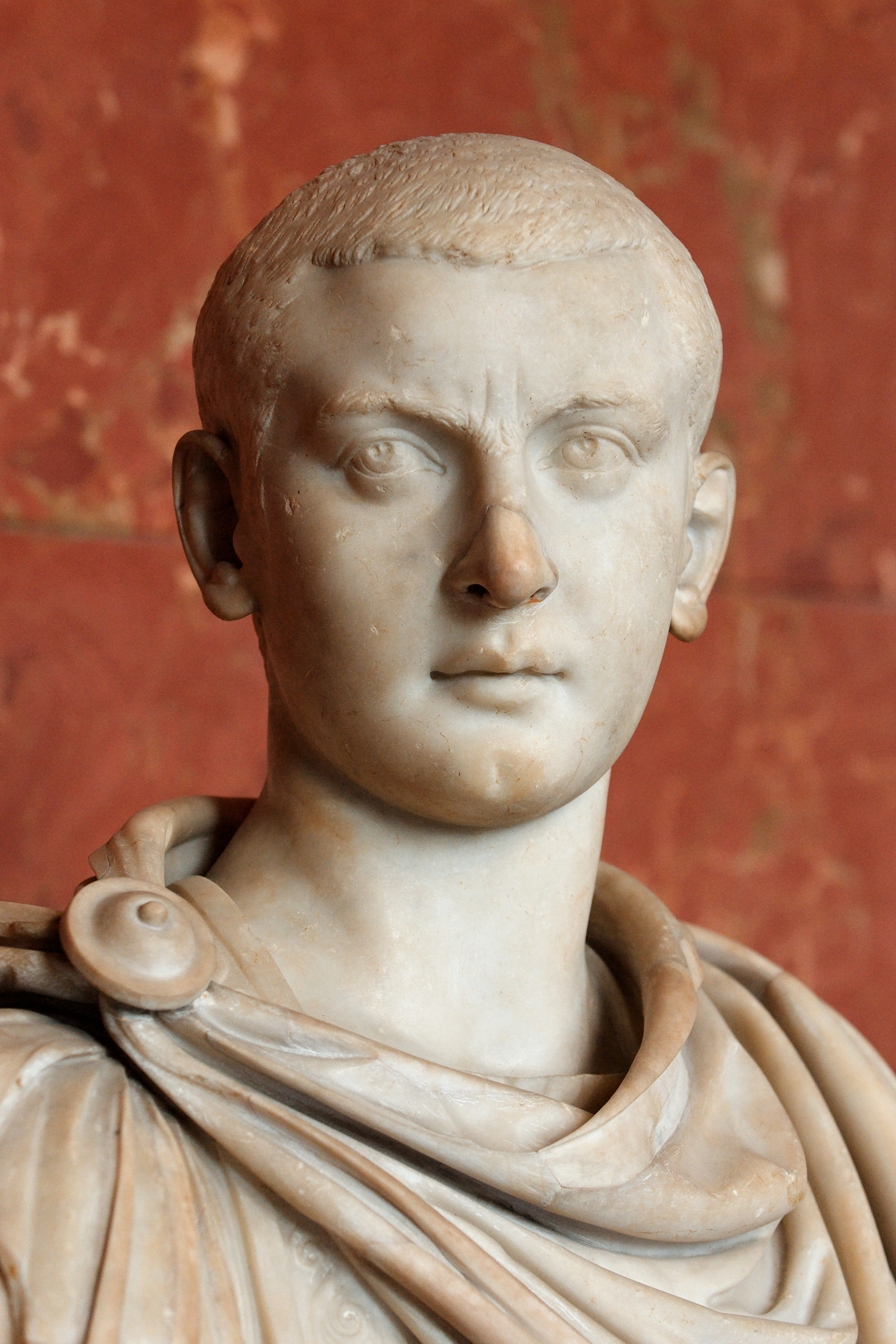
- Bust in the Louvre

Roman emperor
- Augustus: c. August 238 – February 244
- Predecessor: Pupienus and Balbinus
- Successor: Philip the Arab
- Caesar: c. May – August 238
- Born: 20 January 225 (Note: Gordian's birthday is recorded in the Chronograph of 354. The year is often given as 225 or 226 on the basis of a statement in the Epitome de Caesaribus, which was written around the year 400. The text explicitly states that he was "killed in the twenty-first year of his life", meaning that he was twenty, i.e. born in 224. However, the historian Herodian, who lived during Gordian's reign, states that he was "about thirteen".); Rome, Italy
- Died: 11 February 244 (aged 19); Zaitha, Mesopotamia
- Spouse: Tranquillina
Names
- Marcus Antonius Gordianus
Regnal name
- Imperator Caesar Marcus Antonius Gordianus Augustus
- Dynasty: Gordian
- Father: Junius Balbus (purportedly)
- Mother: Maecia Faustina (purportedly)

Gordian III (Latin: Marcus Antonius Gordianus; 20 January 225 – c. February 244) was Roman emperor from 238 to 244. At the age of 13, he became the second-youngest sole emperor of the united Roman Empire. (Note: The youngest sole emperor was Severus Alexander, who was around two months younger when he became emperor. Later child emperors only ruled one half of the Empire, e.g. Honorius (aged 10) and Valentinian III (aged 6) in the West, and Theodosius II (aged 7) and Michael III (aged 2) in the East.) Gordian was the son of Maecia Faustina and her husband Junius Balbus, who died before 238. Their names are mentioned in the unreliable Historia Augusta. Maecia was the daughter of Emperor Gordian I and sister of Emperor Gordian II. Very little is known of his early life before his acclamation.

== Rise to power ==
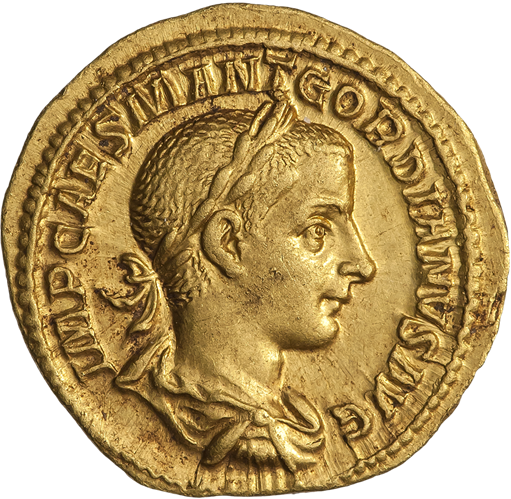
Aureus of Gordian III. Inscription: IMP. CAES. M. ANT. GORDIANVS AVG.

In 235, following the murder of Emperor Alexander Severus in Moguntiacum (modern Mainz), the capital of the Roman province Germania Superior, Maximinus Thrax was acclaimed emperor. In the following years, there was a growing opposition against Maximinus in the Roman Senate and amongst the majority of the population of Rome. In 238, a rebellion broke out in the Africa Province, where Gordian's grandfather and uncle, Gordian I and II, were proclaimed joint emperors. This revolt was suppressed within a month by Cappellianus, governor of Numidia and a loyal supporter of Maximinus Thrax.

The Senate, showing its hostility towards Maximinus by supporting the Gordiani, elected Pupienus and Balbinus as joint emperors. These senators were not popular men, so the Senate decided to raise Marcus Antonius Gordianus to the rank of Caesar (heir). Maximinus, moving quickly to attack the Senate's newly elected emperors, encountered difficulties marching his army through an Alpine winter. Arriving at Aquileia and short on supplies, Maximinus besieged the city. After four weeks, Maximinus' demoralized army mutinied and the Legio II Parthica murdered him.

The situation for Pupienus and Balbinus, despite Maximinus' death, was doomed from the start with popular riots, military discontent and an enormous fire that consumed Rome. Soon after, Pupienus and Balbinus were killed by the Praetorian Guard and Gordian proclaimed sole emperor. The exact chronology of events is disputed, but it was probably around August. (Note: The chronology of Gordian’s accession is heavily disputed. Contemporary papyri show that news of his accession arrived to Egypt between the 8th (when Pupienus and Balbinus are last mentioned) and 21st of September, which suggests a date of mid-August. However, a Greek inscription in Shaqqa (Syria) dated to 27 March could suggest an earlier date. The name of the emperor is erased, and one view identifies him as Gordian III. However, an identification with Maximinus appears to be more likely. Maximinus, unlike Gordian, did suffer from damnatio memoriae, and he is last mentioned in papyri from 7 April, while the Gordians are first mentioned in 13 June.)

== Reign ==
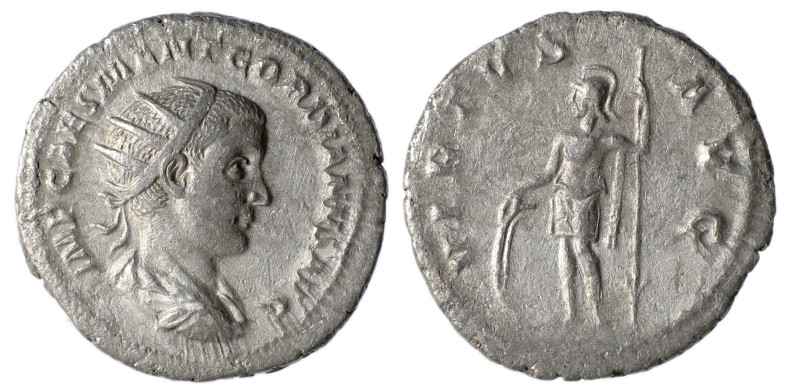
Silver Antoninianus of Gordian III, mint of Rome, 238–239 AD; Obverse: IMP CAES M ANT GORDIANVS AVG, radiate, draped and cuirassed bust right; Reverse: VIRTVS AVG, Virtus standing facing in military dress, head left, with shield and spear; Reference: RIC 6, RSC 381

Due to Gordian's age, the imperial government was surrendered to the aristocratic families, who controlled the affairs of Rome through the Senate. In 240, Sabinianus revolted in the African province, but he was quickly defeated. In 241, Gordian was married to Furia Sabinia Tranquillina, daughter of the newly appointed praetorian prefect, Timesitheus. As chief of the Praetorian Guard and father-in-law of the Emperor, Timesitheus quickly became the de facto ruler of the Roman Empire.

During Gordian's reign there were severe earthquakes, so severe that cities fell into the ground along with their inhabitants. In response to these earthquakes Gordian consulted the Sibylline Books.

By the 3rd century, the Roman frontiers weakened against the Germanic tribes across the Rhine and Danube, and the Sassanid Empire across the Euphrates increased its own attacks. When the Sasanians under Shapur I invaded Mesopotamia, the young emperor opened the doors of the Temple of Janus for the last time in Roman history, and sent a large army to the East. The Sassanids were driven back over the Euphrates and defeated in the Battle of Resaena (243). The campaign was a success and Gordian, who had joined the army, was planning an invasion of the enemy's territory, when his father-in-law died in unclear circumstances. Without Timesitheus, the campaign, and the Emperor's security, were at risk. Due to the campaign's success, Gordian boasted about his achievements to the Senate.

Gaius Julius Priscus and, later on, Priscus' own brother Marcus Julius Philippus, also known as Philip the Arab, stepped in at this moment as the new Praetorian Prefects. Gordian then started a second campaign. Around February 244, (Note: Gordian is last mentioned in an Egyptian inscription dated 26 February; Philip is first attested in a law of the Codex Justinianus dated 14 March. Taking into account travel time from Syria to Rome, it's likely that Gordian died in late January or early February, with news of his death arriving in Rome in late February or early March.) the Sasanians fought back fiercely to halt the Roman advance to Ctesiphon.

The exact fate of Gordian is unclear, but he was most likely killed at the Battle of Misiche. An inscription erected by Shapur I claims a major Sasanian victory over the Romans near modern Fallujah (Iraq) and the death of Gordian III, after which Philip bought peace for 500,000 dinars. Roman sources claim that the soldiers proclaimed Philip emperor, that he made peace with Shapur on "shameful" terms, and that Gordian died as the Roman forces departed for the west. Zonaras says that Gordian died after falling from his horse during a battle. One view holds that Gordian died at Zaitha, murdered by his frustrated army, while the role of Philip is unknown. Scholarly analyses suggest the Sasanian version, "while defective[,] is superior" to the Roman one, which provides no explanation for why the victorious Roman army had to make peace on disadvantageous terms.

The interment of Gordian's body is also a matter of controversy. According to David S. Potter, Philip transferred the body of the deceased emperor to Rome and arranged for his deification. Edwell, Dodgeon, and Lieu state that Philip had Gordian buried at Zaitha after the campaign against the Sasanians had ended in failure.

== Family tree ==
GORDIAN DYNASTY family tree

previous Maximinus Thrax; Roman Emperor; 235–238	Pupienus; Roman Emperor; 238	Gordian I Roman Emperor; 238 ∞ (?) Fabia Orestilla	Nerva-Antonine Dynasty, perhaps? (For Gordian I,the connection is through his probable wife, Fabia Orestilla)
Balbinus; Roman Emperor; 238	Gordian II co-emperor 238	Maecia Faustina (called by modern historians as Antonia Gordiana)	(doubted); Junius Licinius Balbus consul suffectus	Gaius Furius Sabinius Aquila Timesitheus praetorian prefect	next Philip the Arab; Roman Emperor; 244–249
Claudius II Gothicus (perhaps, although disputed, if so, his brother Quintillus became the next emperor and is also a member of the Gordianic dynasty); Roman Emperor; 268–270	Gordian III; Roman Emperor; 238-244	Furia Sabinia Tranquillina	Philip II; Roman Emperor co-emperor 247–249
CONSTANTINIAN DYNASTY, probably spurious
(see Family tree of Byzantine emperors)

== Sources ==
- Bland, Roger (2023). The coinage of Gordian III from the mints of Antioch and Caesarea. London: Spink.
- Boin, Douglas (2018). A Social and Cultural History of Late Antiquity. Wiley. ISBN 978-111-907-681-0.
- Brosius, Maria (2006). The Persians. Routledge.
- Cooley, Alison E. (2012). The Cambridge Manual of Latin Epigraphy. Cambridge University Press. ISBN 978-0-521-84026-2.
- D’Amato, Raffaele (2020). Roman Standards & Standard-Bearers (2): AD 192–500. Osprey Publishing.
- Dodgeon, Michael H.; Lieu, Samuel N. C., eds. (1991). The Roman Eastern Frontier and the Persian Wars (AD 226–363): A Documentary History, Part 1. Taylor & Francis.
- Drinkwater, John (2007). "Maximinus to Diocletian and the 'Crisis'". In Bowman, Alan K.; Garnsey, Peter; Cameron, Averil (eds.). The Cambridge Ancient History: The crisis of Empire, A.D. 193–337. Vol. XII (2nd ed.). Cambridge University Press.
- Edwell, Peter (2020). Rome and Persia at War: Imperial Competition and Contact, 193–363 CE. Taylor & Francis. ISBN 9781317061267.
- Mennen, Inge (2011). Power and Status in the Roman Empire, AD 193-284. Brill.
- Potter, David S. (2004). The Roman Empire at Bay, AD 180–395. Routledge.
- Raven, Susan (1993). Rome in Africa (3rd ed.). Routledge.
- Shahbazi, Shapur (2017). "ŠĀPUR I". Encyclopaedia Iranica.
- Townsend, Prescott Winson (1934). The Administration of Gordian III. Yale University Press.
- Tucker, Spencer C., ed. (2010). "241-244:Southwest Asia". A Global Chronology of Conflict: From the Ancient World to the Modern Middle East. ABC-CLIO.
- Varner, Eric R. (2004). Monumenta Graeca et Romana: Mutilation and Transformation : Damnatio Memoriae and Roman Iperial Portraiture. Brill.
- Wilhite, David E. (2007). Tertullian the African: An Anthropological Reading of Tertullian's Context and Identities. Walter de Gruyter GmbH & Co.

Regnal titles
Preceded by Pupienus and Balbinus	Roman emperor 238–244	Succeeded by Philip the Arab
Political offices
Preceded by Fulvius Pius, and Pontius Proculus Pontianus	Roman consul 239 with Manius Acilius Aviola	Succeeded by C. Octavius Appius Suetrius Sabinus, and L. Ragonius Venustus
Preceded by C. Octavius Appius Suetrius Sabinus, and L. Ragonius Venustus	Roman consul 241 with Clodius Pompeianus	Succeeded by C. Gaius Vettius Gratus Atticus Sabinianus, and C. Gaius Asinius Lepidus Praetextatus
