= Herodian =

Greco-Roman official and historian (c.170–c.240)

Herodian or Herodianus (Greek: Ἡρωδιανός), sometimes referred to as Herodian of Antioch (c. 170 – c. 240), was a minor Roman civil servant who wrote a colourful history in Greek titled History of the Empire from Marcus onwards (τῆς μετὰ Μάρκον βασιλείας ἱστορία) in eight books covering the years 180 to 238. His work is not considered entirely reliable, although his less biased account of Elagabalus may be more useful than that of Cassius Dio. The origin of Herodian is contested in scholarship, popular hypotheses being Syria, Alexandria in Egypt, or Asia Minor. However, he appears to have lived for a considerable period of time in Rome, possibly without holding any public office. From his extant work, it seems that he was still living at an advanced age during the reign of Gordianus III, who ascended the throne in 238. Beyond this, nothing is known of his life.

Herodian writes (1.1.3; 2.15.7) that the events described in his history occurred during his lifetime. Photios I of Constantinople (Codex 99) gives an outline of the contents of this work and passes a flattering encomium on the style of Herodian, which he describes as clear, vigorous, agreeable, and preserving a happy medium between an utter disregard of art and elegance and a profuse employment of the artifices and prettinesses which were known under the name of Atticism, as well as between boldness and bombast. He appears to have used Thucydides as a model to some extent, both for style and for the general composition of his work, often introducing speeches wholly or in part imaginary.

== Birth, life, and death ==
The dates of the birth and death of Herodian are unknown. All available information concerning his life is derived from what he himself wrote, so the evidence is scarce. One can assume that he must have reached the age of ten by the year 180 due to the attentive detail in his descriptions of the events of that time. One notion is that Herodian must have finished writing around 240, which would have made him about 70. He mentions, “My aim is to write a systematic account of the events within a period of seventy years, covering the reigns of several emperors, of which I have personal experience.” (2.15.7) This reaffirms the notion that Herodian was about 70 years of age when this was written and that the actions did indeed occur during his lifetime. However, it is possible that his history was composed at a later date. Herodian's descriptions of Gordian III are less than flattering, and it is doubtful that he released such a negative review of a current emperor. Following this logic, his history was finished in 244 at the earliest, when Gordian III died. In his first and third books, Herodian mentions the games of Commodus in 192, and the Secular Games of Septimius Severus in 204. If Herodian attended the games of Commodus, he had been at least 14 at the time, which is to say that he was born in 178 at the latest.

=== Origin ===
The origin of Herodian is also unclear. Some scholars think that he can't be from Italy, for he says the Alps were bigger than “anything in our part of the world” (2.11.8) – but this passage can also be understood as “anything else in our part of the world” (i. e. the Roman Empire). It has been suggested that Herodian was from Alexandria since he placed such a large emphasis on Caracalla's massacre of this city and its inhabitants. It is also believed that he could have possibly been an eyewitness to these attacks. However, a number of errors in his account speak against this origin. Herodian does refer to Alexandria as the second city of the empire; however, this may be disregarded since he also applies the same title to Antioch and Carthage. It has been proposed that Herodian was the son of Aelius Herodianus, an Alexandrian grammarian. Although this does fit chronologically, there is no other evidence to support it.

Another popular speculation, however, is that Herodian was a Syrian, maybe from Antioch. Herodian describes the character of the Syrians as quick-witted and mentions them twice more. However, there are also gaps in Herodian's knowledge of Syrian affairs which lead one to believe that he might not have been from the region at all. For example, he confuses two Parthian kings, and his chronology and geography of the Parthian campaign in 197–198 are deeply flawed. These flaws could be explained with a lack of knowledge of a small part of the empire; however, one would assume that an inhabitant of Syria would have had access to this knowledge.

The third hypothesis regarding his origin is that Asia minor was his home. This assumption is based, among other factors, on the frequent mention of cities in Asia Minor in his work and the fact that he doesn't make factual errors in this passages (unlike in his comments on other regions). Since its first publication in the mid-20th century, this hypothesis has become the most widely accepted of the possible origins. However, unless an inscription is discovered, Herodian's place of birth will never be known for certain.

=== Occupation and social status ===
Neither the occupation nor the social status of Herodian is known. Herodian mentions, “I have written a history of the events following the death of Marcus which I saw and heard in my lifetime. I had a personal share in some of these events during my imperial and public service.” (1.2.5) It has been suggested that Herodian was a senator due to his knowledge of the senatus consultum tacitum, which was a secret declaration by the senate when they chose the emperors Pupienus and Balbinus. However, it is also stated that news of this was leaked by some senators, and it certainly would not have remained a secret for the entirety of Herodian's lifetime. It is possible, however, that Herodian was a freedman. This fits the profile perfectly, for he would not have cared for the larger political issues, and instead, would have concentrated on personalities and intricacies. Still yet, Herodian could have been an apparitor, a scribe or an attendant to the emperor. This would be suiting, for he would have had access to senatorial documents, traveled extensively, and been knowledgeable in the field of fiscal affairs, which Herodian repetitively stressed in his history.

== The Roman History ==
Herodian's Roman History is a collection of eight books covering the period from the death of Marcus Aurelius in 180 AD to the beginning of Gordian III's reign in 238. It provides a first person account of one of the most politically diverse times of the Roman Empire. The first book describes the reign of Commodus from 180 to 192, and the second discusses the Year of the Five Emperors in 193. Book Three encompasses the reign of Septimius Severus from 193 to 211, while the fourth discusses the reign of Caracalla from 211 to 217. Book Five is about the reign of Elagabalus from 218 through 222, and Book Six deals with the reign of Severus Alexander from 222 to 235. The seventh book recounts the reign of Maximinus Thrax from 235 to 238, and the final one describes the Year of the Six Emperors in 238. Most likely, Herodian is writing for an eastern audience, for he often explains different Roman customs and beliefs that would have seemed foreign to Easterners.

Herodian has been both praised and criticized by scholars. The first person on record to review Herodian is the ninth-century patriarch of Constantinople, Photius. Photius wrote of Herodian: "he neither exaggerates with hyperbole nor omits anything essential; in short, in all the virtues of historiography there are few men who are his superior.” Zosimus used him as a source as did John of Antioch when writing his World Chronicle. An English translator of the Roman History wrote in 1705 that Herodian "still preserves a Majesty suitable to the Greatness of the Subject which he treats, and has something in him so pleasing and comely, as perhaps all the Art and Labour of other Men can never reach.” Altheim commended Herodian's wide vision of the period, and F.A. Wolf acclaimed Herodian's lack of bias and superstition. However, not all views of Herodian are positive. For example, Wolf also charged Herodian with a deficiency in critical faculty. While the author of the Historia Augusta drew from Herodian, he also censured him for bias, and Herodian was by no means Zosimus’ first choice. Similarly, Joannes Zonaras only utilized Herodian where Cassius Dio's history leaves off.

Herodian has long been criticized for a lack of historical accuracy, but recent studies have tended to side with him, legitimizing his historical facts. In the second book, Herodian states that his intention was to “narrate only the most important and conclusive…actions separately and in chronological order.” (2.15.7) Because of this, Herodian sometimes conflates a large number of events into a single reference or two. For example, all of Caracalla's campaign in the north during 213 through 214 is condensed into two short allusions. Similarly, a single reference to a winter in Sirmium sums up Maximinus’ battles on the Rhine and Danube in 236 through 238. Herodian also occasionally falls short in his descriptions of geography. He confuses Arabia Scenite with Arabia Felix and claims that Issus was where the final battle and capture of Darius III took place.

In regard to Cassius Dio, both he and Herodian admittedly make many errors in their histories. Dio is credited as the expert when it comes to the senate; however, Herodian challenges Dio on his description of the people's reaction to the proclamation of Septimius Severus as their new emperor. Dio's work is not always the more accurate of the two and must not be immediately chosen over Herodian's.

== Bibliography ==
- Alföldy, Géza (1971). "Herodians Person" [The person of Herodian]. Ancient Society. 2: 204–233.
- Chrysanthou, Chrysanthos S. (2022). Reconfiguring the Imperial Past. Narrative Patterns and Historical Interpretation in Herodian’s History of the Empire. Leiden/Boston: Brill. ISBN 978-90-04-51689-2.
- Kemezis, Adam M. (2014). Greek Narratives of the Roman Empire under the Severans: Cassius Dio, Philostratus and Herodian. Cambridge University Press. pp. 227–272. doi:10.1017/CBO9781107477308. ISBN 978-1-107-06272-6.
- Hidber, Thomas (2006). Herodians Darstellung der Kaisergeschichte nach Marc Aurel [Herodian's account of the imperial history after Marcus Aurelius]. Basel: Schwabe, ISBN 3-7965-2003-0.
- Roos, A. G. (1915). "Herodian's Method of Composition". In: The Journal of Roman Studies, Vol. 5, pp. 191–202.
- Whittaker, C. R. (1969–1970). Herodian: History of the Empire, Volume I–II, Books 1–8 (Loeb Classical Library, No. 454–455). London: Heinemann.
  - Review: Carney, T. F. (1971). "Herodian". In: The Classical Review, New Series, Vol. 21, No. 2, pp. 194–196.
  - Review: Downey, Glanville (1971). "Herodian, vol. 1: books I–IV". In: The Classical Journal, Vol. 67, No. 2, pp. 182–184.
- Zimmermann, Martin (1999). Kaiser und Ereignis. Studien zum Geschichtswerk Herodians [Emperor and Event. Studies on the Historical Work of Herodian]. Munich: Beck. ISBN 3-406-45162-4.
