= Joannes Zonaras =

12th century Byzantine chronicler and theologian

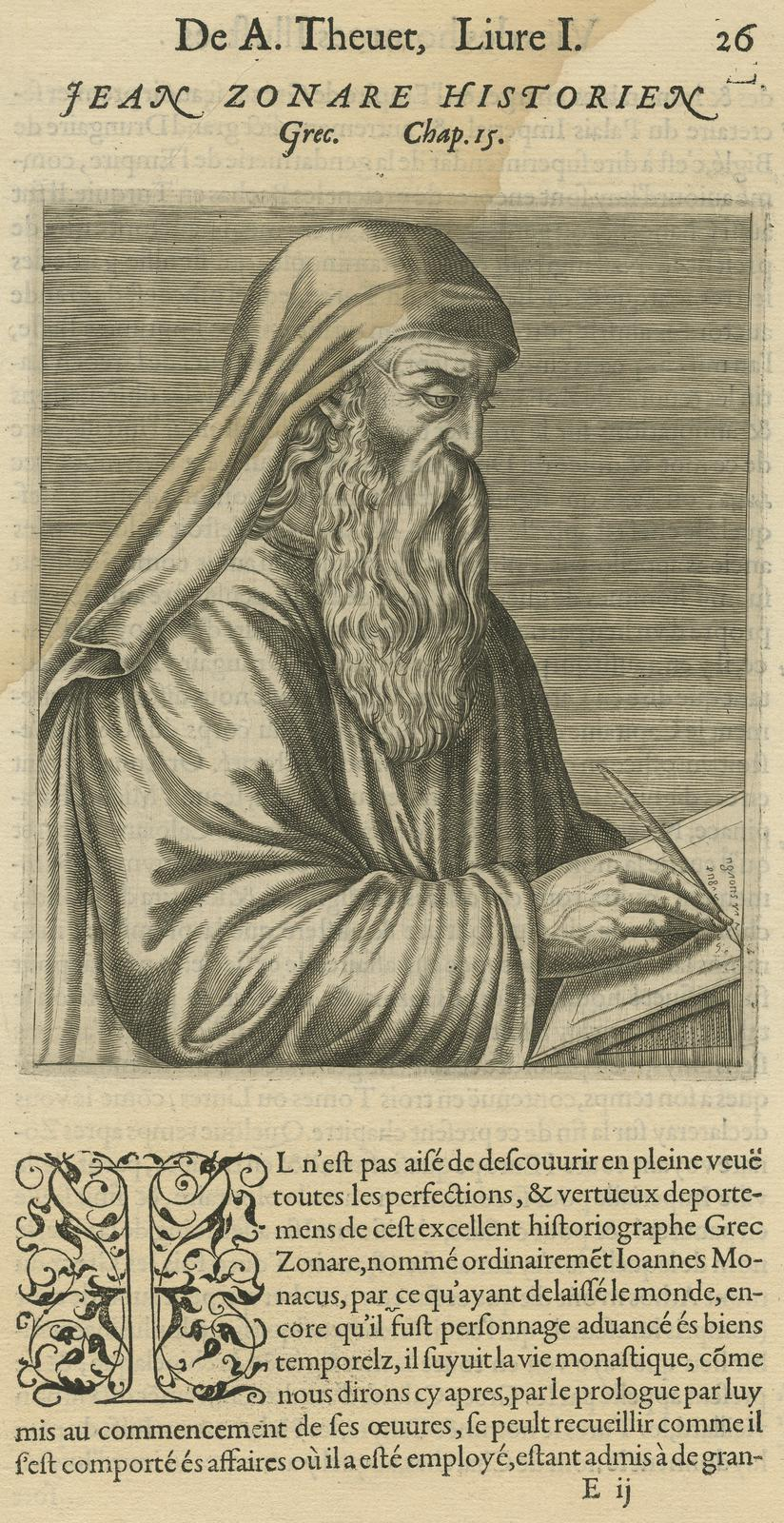
16th-century depiction of Joannes Zonaras.

Joannes or John Zonaras (Ancient Greek: Ἰωάννης Ζωναρᾶς Iōánnēs Zōnarâs; c. 1070 – c. 1140) was a Byzantine historian, chronicler and theologian who lived in Constantinople. Under Emperor Alexios I Komnenos he held the offices of head justice and private secretary (protasēkrētis) to the emperor, but after Alexios' death, he retired to the monastery on the Island of Hagia Glykeria, (İncir Adası, in the Bay of Tuzla), where he spent the rest of his life writing books.

== Life ==
Almost nothing is known of Zonaras's life. However, various elements can be inferred from his own writings. In one of his writings he states that he "saw" the second marriage of an emperor. This could have been the marriage of Nikephoros III with Maria of Alania in late 1078 or perhaps even the marriage of Manuel I Komnenos to Maria of Antioch in 1161 which would put Zonaras' death significantly later. It's not known with certainty if Zonaras served under John II Komnenos (r. 1118–1143), although this is still a possibility. Zonaras' Epitome served as the basis of Constantine Manasses' chronicle, which was commissioned by Irene Komnene, the widow of the sebastokrator Andronikos Komnenos. Given that Irene died on (or shortly before) 1153, this work must have been written c. 1150 or 1145. Furthermore, it's possible that Irene requested this shorter chronicle precisely because she had already seen Zonaras' Epitome. Therefore, it can be inferred that Zonaras had already died by 1145.

== Written works ==
His most important work, Extracts of History (Ancient Greek: Ἐπιτομὴ Ἱστοριῶν, Latin: Epitome Historiarum), in eighteen books, extends from the creation of the world to the death of Alexius (1118). The earlier part is largely drawn from Josephus; for Roman history he chiefly followed Cassius Dio up to the early third century. Contemporary scholars are particularly interested in his account of the third and fourth centuries, which depend upon sources, now lost, whose nature is fiercely debated. Central to this debate is the work of Bruno Bleckmann, whose arguments tend to be supported by continental scholars but rejected in part by English-speaking scholars. An English translation of these important sections has recently been published. The chief original part of Zonaras' history is the section on the reign of Alexios I Komnenos, whom he criticizes for the favour shown to members of his family, to whom Alexios entrusted vast estates and significant state offices. His history was continued by Nicetas Acominatus.

Various ecclesiastical works have been attributed to Zonaras — commentaries on the Church Fathers and the poems of Gregory of Nazianzus; lives of Saints; and a treatise on the Apostolic Canons — and there is no reason to doubt their genuineness. The lexicon, however, which has been handed down under his name (ed. J. A. H. Tittmann 1808) is probably the work of a certain Antonius Monachus (Stein's Herodotus, ii.479 f).

During his retirement as a monk to the monastery of Mount Athos, Zonaras wrote a commentary on the canons of the Eastern Orthodox Church. In discussing Canon 50, laid down by the Quinisext Council and requiring both clergy and laity to give up the use of dice, he extended the prohibition to chess as well. This was the first Orthodox ecclesiastical denunciation of the game. The commentary runs, "Because there are some of the Bishops and clergy who depart from virtue and play chess (zatikron) or dice or drink to excess, the Rule commands that such shall cease to do so or be excluded; and if a Bishop or elder or deacon or subdeacon or reader or singer do not cease so to do, he shall be cast out: and if laymen be given to chess-playing and drunkenness, they shall be excluded."
