= Sasanian campaign of Gordian III =

242–244 military campaign

Roman-Sasanian Wars of 242–244 AD
- Part of Shapur I's first Roman campaign
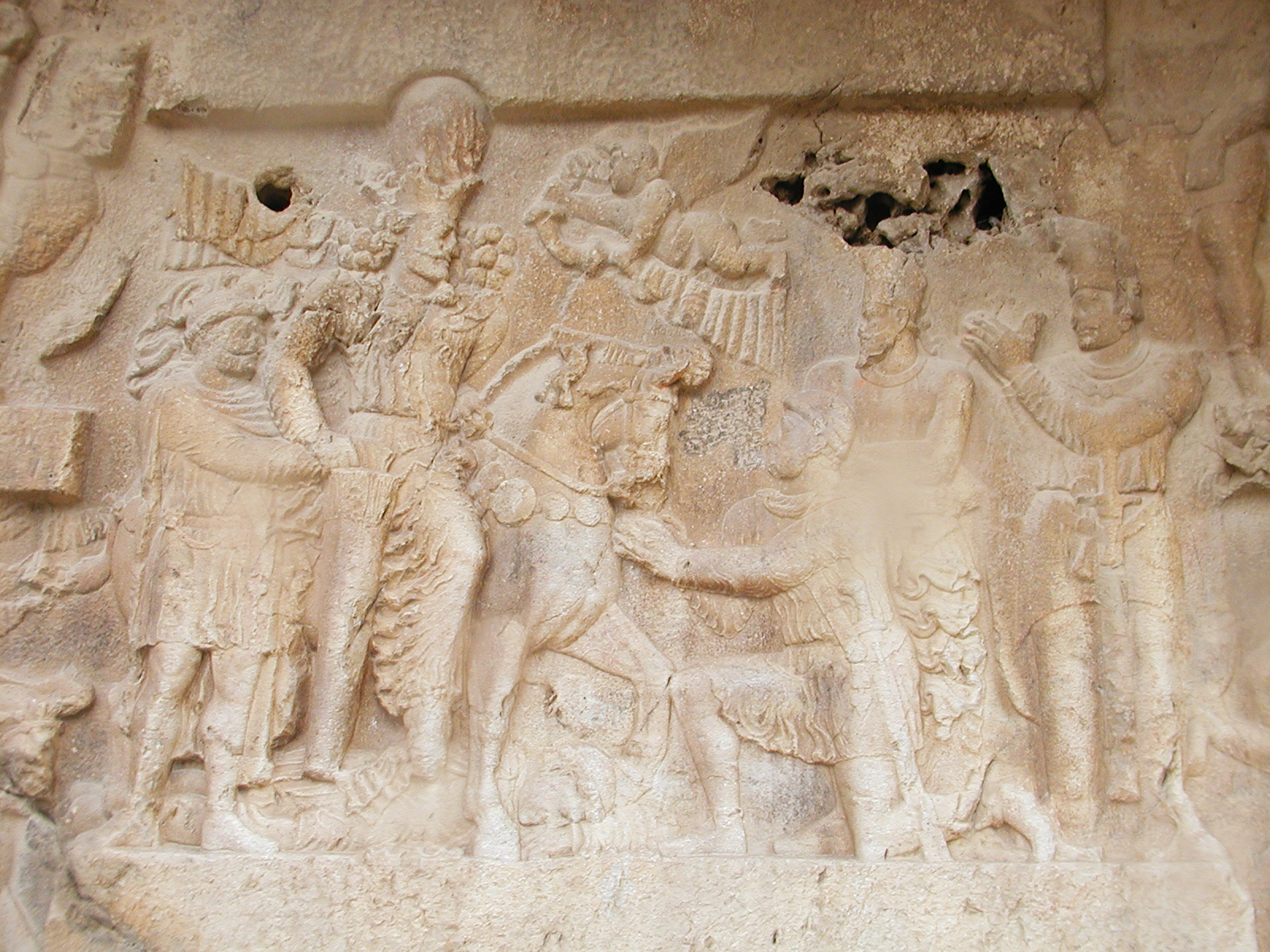
- Relief at Bishapur celebrating the victory of Shapur I over the Romans at Misiche: Gordian III is trampled by the Sasanian king's horse, while Philip the Arab is held tight by Shapur.
Date	242–244 AD
Location	Mesopotamia, Armenia and Osroene
Result	Sasanian victory (Note: The victory in the campaign is mentioned on the trilingual inscription king Shapur I made at Naqsh-e Rustam.)
Territorial changes	The Sasanian Empire conquers Armenia and Mesopotamia

Belligerents
Roman Empire	Sasanian Empire

Commanders and leaders
Emperor Gordian III (PKIA), Timesitheus	Shapur I

Units involved
- see section for details

Strength
150–170,000 armed men (13 full legions, 14 vexillationes and some auxilia) along the entire eastern limes (half or 1/3 of which took part in the invasion) (Note: The forces estimated at 150–170,000 armed men on the Roman side (13 full legions plus vexillationes of 14 other legions), means considering that a good part of these remained to defend the imperial borders (at least half, equal to 85,000 armed men), while the remaining part (the other half), could have constituted the invasion army.)	Uncertain, large army Probably 150,000 armed men (see section for details)

The Sasanian Campaign of Gordian III was an episode of the Roman–Sasanian Wars. The war between the Roman Empire, ruled by the Roman Emperor Gordian III (r. 238–244), during the period of military anarchy, and the rule of the Sasanians, led by Shapur I (r. 241–272), who succeeded his father Ardashir I (r. 224–241), was fought in a period between 242 and 244 and ended with a Sasanian victory and the death of Gordian III.

== Historical context ==
=== Background ===
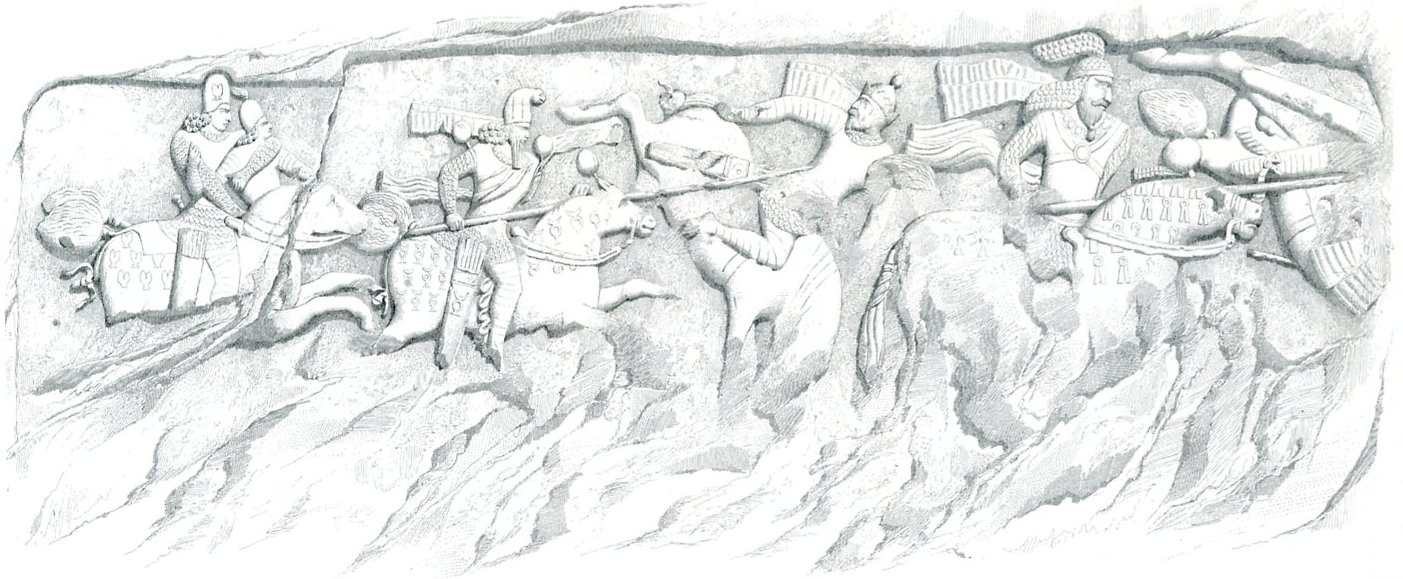
1840 illustration of a Sasanian relief at Firuzabad, depicting Ardashir I's victory over Artabanus IV and his forces.

Between 224 and 226–227 it had happened that in the East the last emperor of the Parthian Empire, Artabanus IV, had been overthrown in the Battle of Hormozdgan on 28 April, and the rebel, Ardashir I, had founded the Sasanian dynasty, destined to be a fearsome eastern adversary of the Romans until the 7th century. Between 242 and 244, the Sasanians and the Romans clashed for the second time.

=== Prelude ===
The prelude was the constant claim, by the Sasanians who considered themselves descendants of the Persians, of possession of the entirety of the Achaemenid Empire, including the now Roman territories of Asia Minor and the Near East, up to the Aegean Sea.

«[Ardashir] Believing that the entire continent facing Europe, separated by the Aegean Sea and the Propontis, and the region called Asia belonged to him by divine right, he intended to recover it for the Persian Empire. He declared that all the countries in the area, between Ionia and Caria, had been governed by Persian satraps, starting with Cyrus the Great, who first transferred the kingdom from Media to the Persians, until Darius III, the last of the Persian rulers, whose kingdom was destroyed by Alexander the Great. Thus according to him it was right to restore and reunite for the Persians the kingdom which they had previously possessed.»

— Herodian, History of the Empire after Marcus Aurelius, VI, 2.2-3. (translated)

=== Casus belli ===
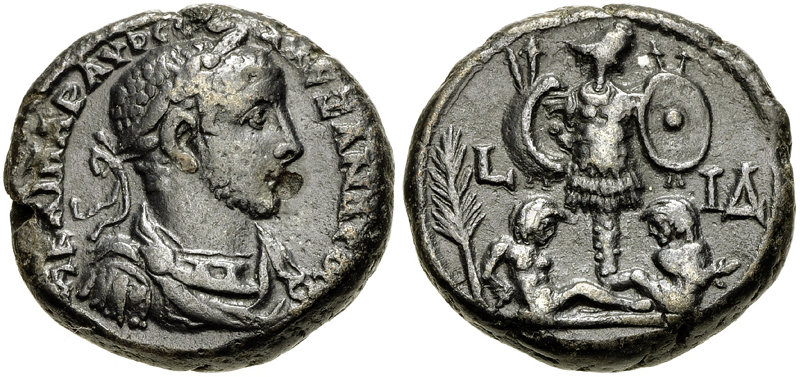
Coin minted in 234–235, celebrating the Persian Victory of Alexander Severus.

In fact, the Sasanian campaign of Severus Alexander of 232 had as their final result that of bringing the two Empires to the status quo of the time of Septimius Severus. The Romans and Sasanians thus returned to establish themselves along the "ancient borders" of a few decades earlier, and peace between the two powers reigned for the next seven/eight years. In the years 239–241, in fact, the Sasanian ruler Ardashir I, together with his son Shapur I, invaded the region, besieging Dura-Europos in vain but perhaps not Antioch on the Orontes in Roman Syria (239), conquering and destroying the city of Hatra, allied with the Romans (in 240), and finally occupying some cities of Roman province of Mesopotamia, Nisibis and Carrhae (the latter two had already been wrested from the Romans during the last months of the reign of Maximinus Thrax).

== Forces in the field ==
=== Sasanian forces ===
We do not know precisely how many and what kind of forces the Sasanians fielded. Cassius Dio had told us about the previous campaign of Alexander Severus and the preceding years (from 229 to 232), that it was a large army, ready to terrorize not only Roman province of Mesopotamia, but also that of Syria, west of the Euphrates.

The Sasanians mainly used the bow and the horse in war, unlike the Romans who favored the infantry while the Sasanians are said to have grown up from childhood, riding and shooting arrows, living constantly for war and hunting.

It should be added that, unlike the Parthians, they tried to keep their contingents under arms for several years, during major military campaigns, speeding up the recruitment of their armies, as well as better assimilating the siege techniques of their Roman opponents, never truly learned from their predecessors.

=== Roman forces ===
We know instead that for the Romans the forces put in charge, They were represented by legions and auxiliary troops placed along the eastern limes. Below is a list of legions and their respective fortresses:

No. of legionary fortresses of the eastern limes	Legionary unit	Ancient location	Modern location	Roman province
1	XV Apollinaris	Satala	Sadagh	Cappadocia
2	XII Fulminata	Melitene	Melitene	Cappadocia
3	III Parthica	Nisibis	Nusaybin	Mesopotamia
4	I Parthica	Singara	Sinjar	Mesopotamia
5	IV Scythica	Zeugma	Belkis	Syria Coele
6	XVI Flavia Firma	Sura	Sura	Syria Coele
7	II Parthica	Apamea		Syria Coele
8	III Gallica	Danaba	Mehin	Syria Phoenicia
9	X Fretensis	Aelia Capitolina	Jerusalem	Syria Palaestina
10	VI Ferrata	Caparcotna	Kfar Otnay	Syria Palaestina
11	III Cyrenaica	Bostra	Bosra	Arabia Petraea

To these legions, already present on the eastern front, were added others coming from the Danube and from other western regions such as:

- the Legio I Adiutrix, I Parthica, II Parthica (?, or was already present on the eastern front, in Apamea), III Cyrenaica, III Gallica, III Parthica, IV Italica, IV Scythica, VI Ferrata, X Fretensis, XII Fulminata, XV Apollinaris and XVI Flavia Firma;

In addition to some vexillationes coming from other fronts such as:

- the Legio I Italica, I Minervia, II Adiutrix, II Italica (?), III Italica, IV Flavia Felix, V Macedonica, VII Claudia Pia Fidelis, VIII Augusta, X Gemina, XI Claudia Pia Fidelis, XIV Gemina, XXII Primigenia and XXX Ulpia Traiana Victrix.

The total forces deployed by the Roman Empire along the entire eastern limes, may have been around 150–170,000 Roman soldiers involved or perhaps more, certainly an immense army, of which half was made up of legionaries, the remainder by auxiliaries.

== Course of the Campaign ==
=== 242-243 AD: First stage of the campaign ===
Timesitheus appears to have sailed to the Roman province of Syria ahead of Gordian. This enabled him to exploit internal instability in the Sasanian Empire, as Ardashir I, the founder of the Sasanian regime, had recently died (possibly as recently as October 241); his successor Shapur I was campaigning against a rebellion of the Gilans, Dailamites and Gurganians, the Gilans and Dailamites being known as great warriors, and he was also contending against an incursion by the Chorasmians, who were allied with the rebels. Although Shapur defeated this coalition in battle and recaptured the rebellious territories, the Romans recaptured Carrhae, defeated the Persian forces in the Battle of Resaena, and then recaptured Nisibis. The emperor, arriving in Syria, then planned a new offensive for the following year, aimed at conquering the enemy capital, Ctesiphon, when Timesitheus died, which seems to be caused by illness.

The praetorian prefect Priscus convinced Gordian to appoint his brother Marcus Julius Philippus (better known as Philip the Arab) as the new praetorian prefect to replace Timesitheus. During the autumn and early winter of this same year, Roman troops advanced along the Euphrates. This is the account of Zosimus, certainly not favorable to Philip the Arab :

«Of Arab origin [Philip], a very bad people, and elevated by fortune starting from a low condition, as soon as he assumed the office [being praetorian prefect], he was seized by the ambition of acceding to the imperial throne. He therefore obtained the favor of the soldiers inclined to revolt and when he saw that the provisions intended for the army were sufficient, while the Emperor [Gordian] was still with the troops at Carrhae and Nisibis, he ordered the ships of the fleet, who brought supplies to the soldiers to advance inland, so that the army oppressed by hunger and lack of food would mature a rebellion.»

— Zosimus, Historia nova, I, 18.3.

Gordian III and Tranquillina: sestertius
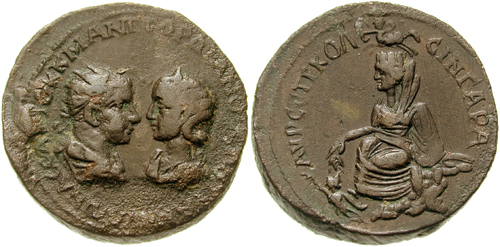
First side of the image: Laureate head of Gordian III wearing cuirass and drapery (left), his wife Tranquillina on the right, facing each other;
Second side of the image: Tyche sitting on a rock, holding a small boat as she crosses a river; above, a Sagittarius (symbol of the Legio I Parthica stationed in Singara), shooting an arrow from his bow.
minted in 243–244 (?)

=== 244: Battle of Misiche and death of Gordian ===
Persian sources report that, early in the year, the Persians and Romans clashed again in the Battle of Misiche (present-day Fallujah or al-Anbar, 40km west of Baghdad), ended with a heavy defeat for the Romans, following which Shapur I, changed the name of the city to Peroz-Shapur ("Victorious Shapur") and celebrated the victory with an inscription at Naqsh-e Rostam in which he claimed to have killed Gordian. The Roman sources never admitted the defeat. The contemporary and later Roman sources claim that the Roman expedition was entirely or partially successful, but the emperor was murdered after a plot by Philip the Arab, who succeeded him on the throne. The inscription on the cenotaph of Circesium was, according to the Historia Augusta, written in Greek, Latin, Persian, Hebrew and Egyptian, so that everyone could read:

«The divus Gordian, conqueror of the Persians, winner of the Goths, conqueror of the Sarmatians, who repelled the mutinies in Rome, winner of the Germans, but not the conqueror of Philip.»

— Historia Augusta, Gordiani tres, 34, 3.

A final version hypothesizes that Gordian died on the way back near "Circesium", after a battle fought against the Persians (Misiche, ?), due to an injury sustained in a fall from a horse.

== Consequences ==
Philip the Arab: antoninianus
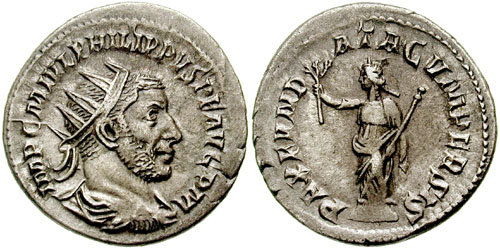
First side of the image: IMP C M IVL PHILIPPVS P F AVG P M, head with a radiate crown, wearing cuirass;
Second side of the image: PAX FVNDATA CVM PERSIS, the Peace standing, holding a branch and a scepter.
22 mm, 4.27 g, minted in 244 ca.

After the death of Gordian III, Philip the Arab paid 500,000 denarii to the Sasanian Empire and cedes Armenia and Mesopotamia to them. The Res Gestae Divi Saporis, an epigraph of the Sasanian emperor, says:

«The Caesar Gordian was killed and the Roman armies were destroyed. The Romans then made a certain Philip "Caesar". Then the "Caesar" Philip came to us to negotiate the terms of peace, and to ransom the lives of the prisoners, giving us 500,000 denarii, and thus became our tributary. For this reason we renamed the locality of Mesiche, Peroz-Shapur (or "Victory of Saphur")

— Res Gestae Divi Saporis, lines 8–9.

The Roman East was then entrusted by Philip to his brother, Priscus, who was appointed Rector Orientis.

== See also ==
- Shapur I's first Roman campaign

== Sources ==
=== Primary or ancient ===
- Historia Augusta, Gordiani tres, English version here, Severus Alexander.
- Ammianus Marcellinus, Storie, XXIII.
- Aurelius Victor, De Caesaribus, XXVII and Epitome de Caesaribus, XXVII.
- British Museum Coins, Mesopotamia.
- Cassius Dio, Historiae Romanae, LXXIX, English version here.
- Herodian, History of the Empire after Marcus Aurelius, VI. English version here..
- Eutropius, Breviarium ab Urbe condita, IX.
- Rufius Festus, Breviarium rerum gestarum populi Romani.
- John of Antioch, Historia chronike.
- Jordanes, De summa temporum vel origine actibusque gentis Romanorum, Latin version here.
- Jerome, Chronicon, 241-244.
- Malalas, Cronografia.
- Paul Orosius, Historiarum adversus paganos libri septem, VII.
- Res Gestae Divi Saporis (translated from an inscription in oarthian and greek, of the ruler Shapur I, found at Naqsh-i-Rustam).
- Syncellus, Selezione di cronografia taken from Corpus Scriptorum Historiae Byzantinae, Bonn 1828-1878.
- Zonaras, L'epitome delle storie, XII. Latin version here.
- Zosimus, Historia nova, I and III.

=== Secondary or modern ===
- Bowman, Alan K. (2005). Bowman, Alan; Cameron, Averil; Garnsey, Peter (eds.). The Cambridge Ancient History: The Crisis of Empire, A.D. 193-337. Cambridge University Press. doi:10.1017/CHOL9780521301992. ISBN 978-1-139-05392-1.
- Brent, Allen (2009). A Political History of Early Christianity. London: T & T Clark. ISBN 978-0-567-60605-1.
- Frye, R. N. (1983). "The political history of Iran under the Sasanians". In Yarshater, Ehsan (ed.). The Cambridge History of Iran, Volume 3(1): The Seleucid, Parthian and Sasanian Periods. Cambridge: Cambridge University Press. pp. 116–180. ISBN 0-521-20092-X.
- González, Julio R. (2003). Historia de las legiones romanas (in Spanish). Madrid: Signifer Libros. ISBN 8493120782.
- Laale, Hans Willer (2011). Ephesus (Ephesos): An Abbreviated History From Androclus To Constantine XI. Bloomington, IN: WestBow Press. ISBN 978-1-4497-1618-9.
- Le Bohec, Yann (2001). L'esercito romano (in Italian). Carocci. ISBN 8843017837.
- Millar, Fergus (1993). The Roman near East (31 BC - AD 337). Cambridge, Massachusetts & London: Harvard University Press. ISBN 978-0415239448.
- Potter, David S. (1990). Prophecy and History in the Crisis of the Roman Empire: A Historical Commentary on the Thirteenth Sibylline Oracle. Oxford University Press. ISBN 978-0198144830.
- Potter, David S. (2004). The Roman Empire at Bay AD 180–395. Routledge. ISBN 0-415-10058-5.
- Southern, Pat. (2001). The Roman Empire from Severus to Constantine. Routledge. ISBN 978-0-415-23943-1.
- Waldron, Byron (2024). "Neglected Iranian and Syriac Evidence on the Persian Campaigns of Gordian III and Galerius". J. Kreiner & G. Wrightson (eds), Ancient Warfare, Volume II: Introducing Current Research (Cambridge Scholars Press).
