= List of battles by casualties =

The following is a list of the casualties count in battles or offensives in world history. The list includes both sieges (not technically battles but usually yielding similar combat-related or civilian deaths) and civilian casualties during the battles.

Large battle casualty counts are usually impossible to calculate precisely, but few in this list may include somewhat precise numbers. Many of these figures, though, are estimates, and, where possible, a range of estimates is presented. Figures display numbers for all types of casualties when available (killed, wounded, missing, and sick) but may only include number killed due to a lack of total data on the event. Where possible, the list specifies whether or not prisoners are included in the count.

This list does not include bombing campaigns/runs (such as the attack on Pearl Harbor and the bombing of Tokyo) or massacres such as the Rape of Nanjing, which, despite potentially massive casualties, are not typically classified as "battles", since they are usually one-sided engagements or the nation attacked is not officially at war with the attackers. Tactical or strategic strikes, however, may form part of larger engagements which are themselves battles, small campaigns or offensives.

== Sieges and urban combat ==
This list, sorted by year, includes sieges as well as modern battles fought primarily in urban areas. Major military operations that included city fighting are listed below this.

| Siege | Year | Conflict | Casualties | |
| Siege | Year | Conflict | (High est.) | (Low est.) |
|---|---|---|---|---|
| Siege of Tyre | 332 BC | Wars of Alexander the Great | 39,000 (including 13,000 civilians and 2,000 executed soldiers) | 34,000 |
| Siege of Gaza | 332 BC | Wars of Alexander the Great | 14,000 | 11,000 |
| Siege of Syracuse (213–212 BC) | 213-212 BC | Second Punic War | 40,000 (including Archimedes) | 9,000 |
| Siege of Carthage | 149-146 BC | Third Punic War | 450,000 (including 50,000 civilians enslaved) | 200,000 |
| Siege of Athens and Piraeus | 87–86 BC | Mithridatic Wars (First Mithridatic War) | 400,000 (including prisoners) | 200,000 |
| Siege of Jerusalem (63 BC) | 63 BC | Mithridatic Wars (First Mithridatic War) | 12,000+ | 5,000 |
| Siege of Alesia | 52 BC | Gallic Wars | 200,000 | 100,000 |
| Siege of Constantinople | 626 | Sasanian–Byzantine wars | 95,000 | 70,000 |
| Siege of Constantinople | 717–718 | Arab–Byzantine wars | 170,000 | 130,000 |
| Siege of Yongqiu | 756 | An Lushan Rebellion | 100,000 | 65,000 |
| Siege of Suiyang | 757 | An Lushan Rebellion | 200,000+ | 160,000 |
| Siege of Yongzhou | 1076 | Lý-Song War | 140,000 | 78,000 |
| Siege of Nicaea | 1097 | First Crusade | 11,000 | 4,000 |
| Siege of Ma'arra | 1098 | First Crusade | 20,000 (including civilians and soldiers executed and cannibalized) | 8,000 |
| Siege of Antioch | 1097-1099 | First Crusade | 20,000 | 4,000 |
| Siege of Jerusalem | 1099 | First Crusade | 70,000 | 3,000 |
| Siege of Tripoli | 1099-1102 | First Crusade | 10,000 | 2,000 |
| Siege of Bukhara | 1220 | Mongol conquest of the Khwarazmian Empire | 30,000 | 15,000 |
| Siege of Gurganj | 1221 | Mongol conquest of the Khwarazmian Empire | 1,200,000 | 90,000 |
| Siege of Baghdad | 1258 | Mongol invasions and conquests | 2,000,000 | 90,000 |
| Siege of Acre | 1291 | Fall of Outremer | 20,000 | 10,000 |
| Siege of Caffa | 1345-1347 | Genoese–Mongol Wars | 60,000 | 15,000 |
| Siege of Golubac | 1428 | Ottoman–Hungarian wars | 20,000 | 10,000 |
| Siege of Constantinople | 1453 | Byzantine–Ottoman wars | 54,000+ | 34,000+ |
| Siege of Vijaya | 1471 | Champa–Đại Việt War (1471) | 300,000+ | 130,000+ |
| Siege of Tenochtitlan | 1521 | Spanish conquest of the Aztec Empire | 240,000 | 100,000 |
| Siege of Szigetvár | 1566 | Ottoman wars in Europe | 33,000 | 23,000 |
| Siege of Chittorgarh | 1567–1568 | Mughal-Rajput Wars (1558–1576) | 40,000 | 35,000 |
| Siege of Ulsan | 1598 | Imjin War | 30,000 | 13,000 |
| Siege of Nagykanizsa | 1601 | Long Turkish War | 37,000 | 25,000 |
| Siege of Ostend | 1601–1604 | Eighty Years' War | 115,000 | 90,000 |
| Siege of Osaka | 1614-1615 | Edo Period | 500,000 | 110,000 |
| Siege of La Rochelle | 1627–1628 | Huguenot rebellions | 35,000 | 27,000 |
| Capture of Maastricht | 1632 | Eighty Years' War | 14,000 | 9,500 |
| Siege of Candia | 1648–1669 | Cretan War | 149,739 | 149,739 |
| Battle of Vienna | 1683 | Great Turkish War | 83,000 | 99,000 |
| Siege of Buda (1686) | 1686 | Great Turkish War | 23,000 | 23,000 |
| Siege of Jinji | 1690–1698 | Deccan wars | 16,000 | |
| First siege of Anandpur | 1700 | Hill States-Sikh Wars | 150,000+ | 150,000+ |
| Siege of Belgrade (1717) | 1717 | Austro-Turkish War (1716–1718) | 50,000 | 50,000 |
| Siege of Izmail | 1790 | Russo-Turkish War (1787–1792) | 50,000+ | ~41,500 |
| Siege of Toulon | 1793 | War of the First Coalition | 21,400 | 7,400 |
| Battle of Praga | 1794 | Kościuszko Uprising | 27,000 | ~21,500 |
| Siege of Mantua | 1796–1797 | War of the First Coalition | 51,000 | 51,000 |
| Siege of Genoa | 1800 | War of the Second Coalition | 28,000 | 28,000 |
| Siege of Danzig | 1807 | War of the Fourth Coalition | 17,900 | 17,900 |
| Second siege of Zaragoza | 1808–1809 | Peninsular War | 64,000 | 64,000 |
| First siege of Sevastopol | 1854–1855 | Crimean War | 230,000 | 230,000 |
| Third Battle of Nanking | 1864 | Taiping Rebellion | 100,000 | 100,000 |
| Siege of Petersburg | 1864–1865 | American Civil War | 70,000 | 70,000 |
| Siege of Vicksburg | 1863 | American Civil War | 36,000 | 20,000 |
| Battle of Gettysburg | 1863 | American Civil War | 50,000 | 50,000 |
| Siege of Paris | 1871 | Franco-Prussian War | 332,142 | 229,000 |
| Siege of Plevna | 1877 | Russo-Turkish War (1877–1878) | 75,000 | 75,000 |
| Siege of Port Arthur | 1904–1905 | Russo-Japanese War | 100,000 | 100,000 |
| Siege of Adrianople | 1912–1913 | First Balkan War | 93,282 | 93,282 |
| Siege of Liege | 1914 | World War I | 25,300 | 6,000 |
| Siege of Przemyśl | 1914 | World War I | 253,000 | 253,000 |
| Siege of Maubeuge | 1914 | World War I | 94,000 | 51,000 |
| Siege of Antwerp | 1914 | World War I | 58,000 | 36,000 |
| Siege of Kut | 1915-1916 | World War I | 50,000 | 36,000 |
| Battle of Taiyuan | 1937 | Second Sino-Japanese War | 130,000 | 130,000 |
| Battle of Xinkou | 1937 | Second Sino-Japanese War | 200,000 | 200,000 |
| Battle of Shanghai | 1937 | Second Sino-Japanese War | 426,140 | 363,700 |
| First Battle of Changsha | 1939 | Second Sino-Japanese War | 80,000+ | 80,000+ |
| Battle of Nanchang | 1939 | Second Sino-Japanese War | 75,328 | 75,328 |
| Siege of Warsaw (1939) | 1939 | World War II | 206,000 | 206,000 |
| Battle of Dunkirk | 1940 | World War II | 88,000 | 88,000 |
| Siege of Malta (World War II) | 1940-1942 | World War II | 21,000 | 21,000 |
| Battle of South Shanxi | 1941 | Second Sino-Japanese War | 120,000+ | 120,000+ |
| Siege of Tobruk | 1941 | World War II | 18,600 | 16,500 |
| Siege of Odessa | 1941 | World War II | 133,813 | 133,813 |
| Battle of Kiev | 1941 | World War II | 761,783 | 761,783 |
| Second siege of Sevastopol | 1941–1942 | World War II | 236,437 | 236,437 |
| Third Battle of Changsha | 1942 | World War II | 84,862 | 84,862 |
| First Battle of Voronezh | 1942 | World War II | 662,847 | 662,847 |
| Battle of Stalingrad | 1942–1943 | World War II | 4,172,000 | 1,250,000 |
| Battle of Changde | 1943 | World War II | 100,000 | 100,000 |
| Battle of West Hubei | 1943 | World War II | 115,830 | 115,830 |
| Siege of Leningrad | 1941–1944 | World War II | 4,000,000 | 1,117,000 |
| Warsaw Uprising | 1944 | World War II | 200,000+ | 200,000+ |
| Siege of Budapest | 1944–1945 | World War II | 422,000 | 422,000 |
| Battle of Berlin | 1945 | World War II | 1,286,367 (including civilians) | 1,057,665 |
| Battle of Okinawa | 1945 | World War II | 240,000 | 130,000 |
| Battle of Manila | 1945 | World War II | 500,000 | 100,000 |
| Battle of the Bulge | 1944–1945 | World War II | 218,900 | 161,370 |
| Siege of Changchun | 1948 | Chinese Civil War | 425,000 | 78,808 |
| Siege of Basra | 1987 | Iran–Iraq War | 85,000 | 85,000 |
| First Battle of Grozny | 1994–1995 | First Chechen War | 33,192 | 32,000 |
| Battle of Aleppo | 2012–2016 | Syrian Civil War | 45,000 | 31,273 |
| Battle of Mosul | 2016–2017 | War in Iraq (2013–2017) | 71,355 | 18,200 |
| Siege of Mariupol | 2022 | Russian Invasion of Ukraine | 85,200 | 8,034 |
| Battle of Bakhmut | 2022–2023 | Russian Invasion of Ukraine | 165,600 | 146,050 |
| Battle of Avdiivka | 2023–2024 | Russian Invasion of Ukraine | 54,000 | 21,000 |
| Israeli invasion of the Gaza Strip | 2023-2025 | Gaza War | 186,000 (June 2024) | 53,939 and 122,797 wounded |
| Siege of El Fasher | 2023–2025 | Sudanese civil war | 150,000 (Note: 150,000 in El Fasher are currently missing or otherwise unaccounted for, as of 5 December 2025) | 60,000 (Note: Low-end estimate of civilian casualties from the United Kingdom's International Development Committee between November and December 2025) |

== Major operations ==
This list includes major operations and prolonged battles or operations fought over a large area or for a long time. The durations of some operations, like the Battle of Moscow, are disputed, so casualty numbers may differ for that reason alone.

| Operation | Year | Conflict | Casualties |
|---|---|---|---|
| Flanders and Rhine campaign | 1713 | War of the Spanish Succession | 190,442 |
| Montenotte Campaign | 1796 | War of the First Coalition | 8,000+ |
| Ulm Campaign | 1805 | War of the Third Coalition | 62,000 |
| French invasion of Russia | 1812 | Napoleonic Wars | 920,000–1,040,000 |
| German Campaign | 1813 | War of the Sixth Coalition | 745,000 |
| Six Days' Campaign | 1814 | War of the Sixth Coalition | 80,000 |
| Hundred Days | 1815 | War of the Seventh Coalition | 241,525 |
| Peninsula Campaign | 1862 | American Civil War | 36,463 |
| Battle of Chancellorsville | 1863 | American Civil War | 30,000–30,500 |
| Overland Campaign | 1864 | American Civil War | 87,000–92,000 |
| Appomattox Campaign | 1865 | American Civil War | 16,500 |
| Battle of Liaoyang | 1904 | Russo-Japanese War | 33,100 |
| Battle of Shaho | 1904 | Russo-Japanese War | 62,500 |
| Battle of Mukden | 1905 | Russo-Japanese War | 160,000 |
| Battle of Sandepu | 1905 | Russo-Japanese War | 22,400 |
| Battle of Lule Burgas | 1912 | First Balkan War | 42,162+ |
| First Battle of Çatalca | 1912 | First Balkan War | 22,000 |
| Battle of Bregalnica | 1913 | Second Balkan War | 36,620 |
| Battle of Kilkis-Lachanas | 1913 | Second Balkan War | 15,700 |
| Serbian campaign | 1914–1915 | World War I | 790,000–1,587,000+ |
| Battle of the Frontiers | 1914 | World War I | 664,191 |
| Battle of Tannenberg | 1914 | World War I | 145,000–160,000 |
| Battle of Galicia | 1914 | World War I | 645,000–700,000 |
| Battle of Cer | 1914 | World War I | 58,500–65,500 |
| First Battle of the Marne | 1914 | World War I | 513,000 |
| First Battle of the Aisne | 1914 | World War I | 263,541+ |
| Battle of the Yser | 1914 | World War I | 18,500+ |
| First Battle of Ypres | 1914 | World War I | 210,000 |
| Battle of Łódź | 1914 | World War I | 270,000–390,000 |
| Battle of the Drina | 1914 | World War I | 70,000 |
| Battle of the Vistula River | 1914 | World War I | 214,480 |
| Battle of Limanowa | 1914 | World War I | 251,120 |
| First Battle of Champagne | 1914–1915 | World War I | 139,532 |
| Battle of Sarikamish | 1914–1915 | World War I | 60,000—85,000 |
| Carpathian Front | 1915 | World War I | 930,751 |
| Second Battle of the Masurian Lakes | 1915 | World War I | 216,200 |
| Second Battle of Ypres | 1915 | World War I | 104,208–107,000 |
| Gallipoli Campaign | 1915 | World War I | 503,000–552,000 |
| Second Battle of Artois | 1915 | World War I | 186,000 |
| Battle of Neuve Chapelle | 1915 | World War I | 23,000 |
| Second Battle of Champagne–Third Battle of Artois | 1915 | World War I | 75,000–440,000 |
| Gorlice–Tarnów Offensive | 1915 | World War I | 300,000–1,087,000 |
| Great Retreat (Russian) | 1915 | World War I | 1,943,800+ |
| Serbian Campaign | 1915 | World War I | 331,000 including prisoners |
| Erzurum offensive | 1916 | World War I | 80,000—85,000 |
| Battle of Erzincan | 1916 | World War I | 63,000 |
| Battle of Mont Sorrel | 1916 | World War I | 14,000 |
| Battle of Verdun | 1916 | World War I | 755,000–976,000 |
| Battle of Asiago | 1916 | World War I | 250,000 |
| Brusilov offensive | 1916 | World War I | 1,500,000–2,500,000 |
| Battle of the Somme | 1916 | World War I | 1,120,000–1,215,000 |
| Monastir Offensive | 1916 | World War I | 111,000 |
| Romanian Campaign | 1916–1917 | World War I | 240,000–933,000, including prisoners |
| Nivelle Offensive | 1917 | World War I | 354,000 |
| Second Battle of the Aisne | 1917 | World War I | 350,000–463,000 |
| Battle of Arras | 1917 | World War I | 278,000–288,000 |
| Battle of Messines | 1917 | World War I | 42,000 |
| Tenth Battle of the Isonzo | 1917 | World War I | 200,000 |
| Third Battle of Ypres | 1917 | World War I | 585,000+ |
| Eleventh Battle of the Isonzo | 1917 | World War I | 273,000 |
| Battle of Caporetto | 1917 | World War I | 60,000 |
| Battle of Cambrai | 1917 | World War I | 95,000 |
| German spring offensive | 1918 | World War I | 1,539,000 |
| Battle of Amiens | 1918 | World War I | 150,000 |
| Operation Michael | 1918 | World War I | 494,616 |
| Battle of the Lys | 1918 | World War I | 204,300–228,340 |
| Third Battle of the Aisne | 1918 | World War I | 257,000 |
| Second Battle of the Piave River | 1918 | World War I | 131,494 killed and wounded, 73,729 prisoners |
| Second Battle of the Marne | 1918 | World War I | 288,000 |
| Battle of Soissons | 1918 | World War I | 287,259 |
| Battle of Saint-Mihiel | 1918 | World War I | 27,500 |
| Hundred Days Offensive | 1918 | World War I | 2,240,000 |
| Meuse–Argonne offensive | 1918 | World War I | 318,000 |
| Battle of Warsaw | 1920 | Polish–Soviet War | 130,000, approximately, not including prisoners |
| Invasion of Manchuria | 1931 | Second Sino-Japanese War | 35,000 |
| Asturias Offensive | 1937 | Spanish Civil War | 50,000 |
| Battle of Jarama | 1937 | Spanish Civil War | 40,000 |
| Battle of Guadalajara | 1937 | Spanish Civil War | 12,000 |
| Aragon Offensive | 1937–1938 | Spanish Civil War | 205,000, including prisoners |
| Battle of Teruel | 1937–1938 | Spanish Civil War | 110,000 |
| Levante Offensive | 1938 | Spanish Civil War | 25,000 |
| Battle of the Ebro | 1938 | Spanish Civil War | 106,500 |
| Battle of Xuzhou | 1938 | Second Sino-Japanese War | 130,000 |
| 1938 Yellow River Flood | 1938 | Second Sino-Japanese War | 800,000 |
| Battle of Wuhan | 1938 | Second Sino-Japanese War | 550,000–700,000 |
| Battles of Khalkhin Gol | 1939 | Soviet–Japanese border conflicts | 42,000–75,000 |
| Battle of Suixian–Zaoyang | 1939 | Second Sino-Japanese War | 49,000 |
| Invasion of Poland | 1939 | World War II | 310,000–914,000 |
| Battle of the Bzura | 1939 | World War II | 232,000–234,000 |
| Winter Offensive | 1939–1940 | World War II | 100,000+ |
| Operation Weserübung | 1940 | World War II | 12,800 |
| Battle of France | 1940 | World War II | 469,000 |
| Battle of Britain | 1940 | World War II | 38,800 (Note: including approximately 35,000 civilian casualties due to bombing) (Note: including approximately 35,000 civilian casualties due to bombing) |
| Hundred Regiments Offensive | 1940 | Second Sino-Japanese War | 62,900 |
| Battle of Keren | 1941 | World War II | 12,600+ killed |
| Battle of Greece | 1941 | World War II | 46,295 |
| Battle of Shanggao | 1941 | Second Sino-Japanese War | 42,000 |
| Battle of Crete | 1941 | World War II | 16,007 |
| Operation Barbarossa | 1941 | World War II | 5,318,000–8,050,000 |
| Battle of Białystok–Minsk | 1941 | World War II | 429,886 including prisoners |
| Battle of Smolensk | 1941 | World War II | 595,606 killed, captured, and missing 300,000 Soviet prisoners |
| Battle of Uman | 1941 | World War II | 223,853 |
| Battle of Kiev (included in Barbarossa) | 1941 | World War II | 761,783 killed, captured, and missing |
| Battle of Bryansk | 1941 | World War II | 700,000 Soviet killed, captured and missing German casualties unknown. |
| Battle of Moscow (included in Barbarossa) | 1941 | World War II | 1,000,000 |
| Battle of Hong Kong | 1941 | World War II | 18,000 including prisoners |
| Battle of Malaya/Battle of Singapore | 1941–1942 | World War II | 143,800, and 60,000 prisoners |
| Battle of Bataan/Battle of Corregidor | 1942 | World War II | 30,000 killed |
| Battle of Lyuban | 1942 | World War II | 365,135 |
| Battle of the Kerch Peninsula | 1942 | World War II | 176,000+ |
| Demyansk Pocket | 1942 | World War II | 300,000 |
| Second Battle of Kharkov | 1942 | World War II | 300,000 |
| Zhejiang-Jiangxi Campaign | 1942 | Second Sino-Japanese War | 356,000 |
| Battle of Gazala | 1942 | World War II | 148,000 |
| First Battle of El Alamein | 1942 | World War II | 30,000 |
| Kokoda Track campaign | 1942 | World War II | 13,000 |
| Case Blue | 1942 | World War II | 1,400,000 |
| Battle of the Caucasus | 1942–1944 | World War II | 625,000 |
| Guadalcanal Campaign | 1942–1943 | World War II | 29,100–31,100 |
| Battles of Rzhev | 1942–1943 | World War II | 2,900,000–3,080,000 |
| Second Battle of El Alamein | 1942 | World War II | 39,400–82,500 |
| Operation Iskra | 1943 | World War II | 129,332 |
| Battle of Kursk | 1943 | World War II | 1,028,617–2,037,000 |
| Operation Kutuzov | 1943 | World War II | 516,344 |
| Allied invasion of Sicily | 1943 | World War II | 36,000+ killed, and over 100,000 Italian POWs |
| Belgorod–Kharkov offensive operation | 1943 | World War II | 202,654–280,634 |
| Battle of Smolensk | 1943 | World War II | 522,059 |
| Dnieper Campaign | 1943 | World War II | 1,582,000–2,480,000 |
| Operation Husky | 1943 | World War II | 16,000 |
| Allied invasion of Italy | 1943 | World War II | 17,092 |
| Bougainville Campaign | 1943–1945 | World War II | 21,929 killed, and 23,571 Japanese prisoners |
| Dnieper–Carpathian Offensive | 1943–1944 | World War II | 1,442,956 |
| Leningrad–Novgorod Offensive | 1944 | World War II | 385,604 |
| Battle of Monte Cassino | 1944 | World War II | 185,000 |
| Battle of Narva | 1944 | World War II | 550,000 all causes |
| Battle of Anzio | 1944 | World War II | 52,200 killed |
| First Jassy–Kishinev Offensive | 1944 | World War II | 195,000 |
| Operation Ichi-Go | 1944 | Second Sino-Japanese War | 1,300,000+ |
| Battle of Normandy | 1944 | World War II | 650,600–795,400 |
| Battle of Cherbourg | 1944 | World War II | 60,000 |
| Battle for Caen | 1944 | World War II | 178,000 |
| Operation Dragoon | 1944 | World War II | 169,600 |
| Battle of Saipan | 1944 | World War II | 43,500 killed, including mass suicides |
| Operation Bagration | 1944 | World War II | 1,430,000 |
| Lvov–Sandomierz offensive | 1944 | World War II | 463,129 |
| Falaise Pocket | 1944 | World War II | 140,000 |
| Second Jassy–Kishinev Offensive | 1944 | World War II | 485,424, including prisoners |
| Operation Market Garden | 1944 | World War II | 27,200 |
| Moro River Campaign | 1944 | World War II | 20,000 |
| Baltic offensive | 1944 | World War II | 280,120 Soviet casualties; German casualties unknown |
| Battle of Aachen | 1944 | World War II | 21,000 |
| Gothic Line offensive | 1944-1945 | World War II | 92,000 |
| Battle of Hürtgen Forest | 1944–1945 | World War II | 63,000 |
| Courland Pocket | 1944–1945 | World War II | 278,819 |
| Battle of Leyte Gulf | 1944 | World War II | 12,000 killed |
| Battle of the Bulge | 1944–1945 | World War II | 161,370–218,900 |
| Vistula–Oder Offensive | 1945 | World War II | 636,191 including prisoners |
| Battle of Luzon | 1945 | World War II | 332,330–345,330, including sick |
| Battle of the Rhineland | 1945 | World War II | 82,000 and 250,000 prisoners |
| Battle of Iwo Jima | 1945 | World War II | 44,821–48,700 |
| East Prussian Offensive | 1945 | World War II | 806,778 including prisoners |
| Battle of Okinawa | 1945 | World War II | 113,920–158,400 |
| Burma campaigns | 1942–1945 | World War II | 700,000 |
| Battle of West Hunan | 1945 | World War II | 50,000 |
| Second Guangxi campaign | 1945 | World War II | 1,000,000 |
| Liaoshen campaign | 1948 | Chinese Civil War | 542,000, including captured |
| Huaihai campaign | 1948 | Chinese Civil War | 689,000, including captured |
| Pingjin campaign | 1948–1949 | Chinese Civil War | 560,000, including captured |
| Shanghai Campaign | 1949 | Chinese Civil War | 213,073 |
| Battle of Inchon | 1950 | Korean War | 17,429 |
| UN offensive into North Korea | 1950 | Korean War | 51,700 |
| Battle of Chosin Reservoir | 1950 | Korean War | 66,000 |
| Battle of Dien Bien Phu | 1954 | First Indochina War | 31,500, not including prisoners |
| Tet Offensive | 1968 | Vietnam War | 65,000 |
| Operation OAU | 1968 | Nigerian Civil War | 30,000 |
| Easter Offensive | 1972 | Vietnam War | 150,000 |
| Operation Dawn 5 | 1984 | Iran–Iraq War | 75,000 |
| Battle of the Marshes | 1984 | Iran–Iraq War | 55,000 |
| Russian invasion of Ukraine | 2022–pres. | Russo-Ukrainian War | 300,000–500,000 |

== Classical formation battles ==
These refer to battles in which armies met on a single field of battle and fought each other for anywhere from one to several days. This type of battle died out in favor of larger military operations.

| Battle | Year | Conflict | Casualties |
|---|---|---|---|
| Battle of Megiddo | 1457 BC | Thutmose III's first campaign in the Levant | 16,000+ |
| Battle of Kadesh | 1274 BC | Second Syrian campaign of Ramesses II | 30,000+ |
| Battle of Qarqar | 853 BC | Assyrian conquest of Aram | 24,000+ |
| Battle of Thymbra | 547 BC | Lydian–Persian War | 100,000 |
| Battle of Marathon | 490 BC | Greco-Persian Wars | 5,000–8,000 |
| Battle of Thermopylae | 480 BC | Greco-Persian Wars | 22,500 |
| Battle of Plataea | 479 BC | Greco-Persian War | 51,500–257,000 |
| Battle of Mycale | 479 BC | Greco-Persian War | 70,000 |
| Battle of Leuctra | 371 BC | Theban–Spartan War | 4,300 |
| Battle of Mantinea | 362 BC | Theban–Spartan War | 18,000 |
| Battle of the Granicus | 334 BC | Wars of Alexander the Great | 7,000 (Note: Estimated casualty figure) |
| Battle of Issus | 333 BC | Wars of Alexander the Great | 20,000-40,000 |
| Battle of Gaugamela | 331 BC | Wars of Alexander the Great | 53,500 |
| Battle of the Persian Gate | 330 BC | Wars of Alexander the Great | 48,500 |
| Battle of the Hydaspes | 326 BC | Wars of Alexander the Great | 23,310 |
| Battle of Sentinum | 295 BC | Third Samnite War | 33,700 |
| Battle of Heraclea | 280 BC | Pyrrhic War | 11,000–26,000 |
| Battle of Asculum | 279 BC | Pyrrhic War | 9,500+ |
| Battle of Beneventum | 275 BC | Pyrrhic War | 20,000 |
| Battle of Messana | 264 BC | First Punic War | 7,400+ |
| Battle of Changping | 260 BC | Warring States period | 700,000 (ancient source & includes prisoners) |
| Battle of the Bagradas River (240 BC) | 240 BC | Mercenary War | 8,000+ |
| Battle of Telamon | 225 BC | Roman–Gallic wars | 56,000+ |
| Battle of Ticinus | 218 BC | Second Punic War | 9,500+ |
| Battle of the Trebia | 218 BC | Second Punic War | 35,000 |
| Battle of Lake Trasimene | 217 BC | Second Punic War | 30,000 |
| Battle of Cannae | 216 BC | Second Punic War | 50,000+ |
| Battle of Silva Litana | 216 BC | Second Punic War | 24,000+ |
| Battle of the Silarus | 212 BC | Second Punic War | 15,000 + |
| Battle of the Metaurus | 207 BC | Second Punic War | 12,000 |
| Battle of Julu | 207 BC | Fall of Qin | 400,000+ (including prisoners) |
| Battle of Wei River | 204 BC | Chu-Han contention | 200,000+ |
| Battle of Utica | 203 BC | Second Punic War | 45,000+ |
| Battle of Gaixia | 203 BC | Chu-Han contention | 100,000+ |
| Battle of the Arius | 200 BC | Antiochus's Bactrian Campaign | 3,750 |
| Battle of Cynoscephalae | 197 BC | Second Macedonian War | 23,700 |
| Battle of Thermopylae (191 BC) | 191 BC | Roman–Seleucid War | 14,000 |
| Battle of Magnesia | 190 BC | Roman–Seleucid War | 53,350 |
| Battle of Pydna | 168 BC | Third Macedonian War | 21,000 |
| Battle of Noreia | 115 BC | Germanic Wars (Cimbrian War) | 24,000 |
| Battle of the Muthul | 109 BC | Jugurthine War | 25,000 |
| Battle of Arausio | 105 BC | Germanic Wars (Cimbrian War) | 85,000 |
| Battle of Aquae Sextiae | 102 BC | Germanic Wars (Cimbrian War) | 90,000 |
| Battle of Chaeronea | 86 BC | Mithridatic Wars (First Mithridatic War) | 50,000 |
| Battle of the Colline Gate | 82 BC | Sulla's civil war | 50,000 |
| Battle of Saguntum (75 BC) | 75 BC | Sertorian War | 11,000 |
| Battle of Chalcedon | 74 BC | Mithridatic Wars (Third Mithridatic War) | 19,000+ |
| Battle of the Silarius River | 71 BC | Third Servile War | 11,000 |
| Battle of Tigranocerta | 69 BC | Mithridatic Wars (Third Mithridatic War) | 10,000+ |
| Battle of the Lycus | 66 BC | Mithridatic Wars (Third Mithridatic War) | 10,000+ |
| Battle of Bibracte | 58 BC | Gallic Wars | 12,000+ |
| Battle of Axona | 57 BC | Gallic Wars | 11,000+ |
| Battle of Carrhae | 53 BC | Roman–Persian Wars | 24,000 |
| Battle of Pharsalus | 48 BC | Caesar's Civil War | 17,000 |
| Battle of Philippi | 42 BC | Liberators' civil war | 24,000 |
| Battle of Actium | 31 BC | Final War of the Roman Republic | 7,500+ |
| Battle of the Teutoburg Forest | AD 9 | Roman–Germanic wars | 20,000 |
| Battle of Idistaviso | AD 16 | Roman–Germanic wars | 20,000+ |
| Battle of Watling Street | AD 61 | Iceni Revolt | 80,400 |
| Battle of Mons Graupius | AD 84 | Roman conquest of Britain | 10,360 |
| Battle of Adamclisi | AD 102 | Dacian Wars | 18,000+ |
| Battle of Sarmizegetusa | AD 106 | Dacian Wars | 21,000+ |
| Battle of Carnuntum | AD 170 | Marcomannic Wars | 20,000+ |
| Battle of Issus (194) | 194 | Year of the Five Emperors | 20,000 |
| Battle of Lugdunum | 197 | Year of the Five Emperors | 90,000 |
| Battle of Guandu | 200 | Three Kingdoms | 78,000 |
| Battle of Red Cliffs | 208 | Three Kingdoms | 100,000 |
| Battle of Barbalissos | 252 | Shapur I's first Roman campaign | 60,000+ |
| Battle of Edessa | 260 | Shapur I's first Roman campaign | 65,000+ |
| Battle of Emesa | 272 | Crisis of the Third Century | 61,000+ |
| Battle of Châlons (274) | 274 | Crisis of the Third Century | 56,000+ |
| Battle of Adrianople | 378 | Gothic War | 40,000+ |
| Battle of the Fei River | 383 | Sixteen Kingdoms period | 700,000+ |
| Battle of the Catalaunian Plains | 451 | Hunnic Invasion | 165,000 (ancient source) |
| Battle of Zhongli | 507 | Northern and Southern dynasties | 200,000+ (ancient source) |
| Battle of Dara | 530 | Iberian War | 8,000+ |
| Battle of Callinicum | 531 | Iberian War | 28,000+ |
| Battle of Taginae | 552 | Gothic War | 8,000+ |
| Battle of the Volturnus | 554 | Gothic War | 18,000+ |
| Battle of the Salsu | 612 | Goguryeo–Sui War | 302,300 (ancient source) |
| Battle of Nineveh | 627 | Byzantine–Sasanian War of 602–628 | 9,000+ |
| Battle of al-Qadisiyyah | 636 | Muslim conquest of Persia | 31,000 |
| Battle of Muzayyah | 633 | Muslim conquest of Persia | 10,000 |
| Battle of Ullais | 633 | Muslim conquest of Persia | 35,000 |
| Battle of River | 633 | Muslim conquest of Persia | 15,000+ |
| Battle of Ajnadayn | 634 | Muslim conquest of the Levant | 55,000 |
| Battle of Yarmouk | 636 | Muslim conquest of the Levant | 70,000 |
| Battle of Walaja | 636 | Muslim conquest of Persia | 22,000 |
| Battle of Nahavand | 642 | Muslim conquest of Persia | 28,500 |
| Battle of Guadalete | 711 | Muslim conquest of the Iberian Peninsula | 20,000+ |
| Battle of Marj Ardabil | 730 | Second Arab-Khazar War | 25,000+ |
| Battle of Tours | 732 | Umayyad invasion of Gaul | 13,000 |
| Battle of Akroinon | 740 | Arab–Byzantine Wars | 13,200+ |
| Battle of Talas | 751 | Muslim conquest of Transoxiana | 50,000+ |
| Battle of Xiangji Temple | 757 | An Lushan Rebellion | 110,000+ |
| Battle of Pliska | 811 | Byzantine–Bulgarian wars | 29,000 |
| Battle of Ashdown | 871 | Viking activity in the British Isles | 9,000 |
| Battle of Brenta | 899 | Hungarian invasions of Europe | 14,000+ |
| Battle of Lechfeld | 955 | Hungarian invasions of Europe | 15,000 |
| Battle of Arcadiopolis | 970 | Sviatoslav's invasion of Bulgaria | 27,000 |
| Battle of the Gates of Trajan | 986 | Byzantine–Bulgarian wars | 27,000 |
| Battle of Clontarf | 1014 | Viking–Irish wars | 10,000 |
| Battle of Kleidion | 1014 | Byzantine–Bulgarian wars | 45,000 |
| Battle of Gwiju | 1019 | Third conflict in the Goryeo–Khitan War | 90,000+ |
| Battle of Dandanaqan | 1040 | Seljuk-Ghaznavid Wars | 35,000+ |
| Battle of Fulford | 1066 | Viking invasions of England | 5,000 |
| Battle of Stamford Bridge | 1066 | Viking invasions of England | 13,000 |
| Battle of Hastings | 1066 | Norman Conquest | 6,000 |
| Battle of Manzikert | 1071 | Byzantine-Seljuk Wars | 25,000 |
| Battle of Langensalza (1075) | 1075 | Saxon Revolt of 1073-1075 | 8,600 |
| Battle of Nhu Nguyet River | 1077 | Lý–Song War | 150,000 |
| Battle of Dyrrhachium (1081) | 1081 | First Norman invasion of the Balkans | 5,000+ |
| Battle of Civetot | 1096 | People's Crusade | 50,000+ |
| Battle of Dorylaeum | 1097 | First Crusade | 7,000+ |
| Battle of Ascalon | 1099 | First Crusade | 13,000+ |
| Battle of Nakło (1109) | 1109 | 1109 German-Polish War | 30,000+ |
| Battle of Ager Sanguinis | 1119 | Crusades | 12,000 |
| Battle of Azaz | 1125 | Crusades | 6,000+ |
| Battle of Crug Mawr | 1135 | Norman invasion of Wales | 13,000 |
| Battle of Legnano | 1177 | Guelphs and Ghibellines | 9,000+ |
| Battle of Montgisard | 1177 | Ayyubid–Crusader War | 25,850 |
| Battle of Hattin | 1187 | Ayyubid–Crusader War | 17,000–20,000 |
| Battle of Philomelion (1190) | 1190 | Third Crusade | 5,100 |
| Battle of Arsuf | 1191 | Third Crusade | 8,000+ |
| Battle of Las Navas de Tolosa | 1212 | Reconquista | 60,000 |
| Battle of Yehuling | 1212 | Mongol conquest of the Jin dynasty | 150,000 |
| Battle of Muret | 1213 | Albigensian Crusade | 16,500 |
| Battle of Bouvines | 1214 | Anglo-French War | 9,000 |
| Battle of Parwan | 1221 | Mongol invasion of Central Asia | 65,000+ |
| Battle of the Kalka River | 1223 | Mongol invasion of Rus' | 50,000 |
| Battle of Sanfengshan | 1232 | Mongol conquest of the Jin dynasty | 125,000 |
| Battle of Legnica | 1241 | Mongol invasion of Poland | 30,000 |
| Battle of Mohi | 1241 | Mongol invasion of Europe | 15,000 |
| Battle of Mansurah | 1250 | Seventh Crusade | 21,000 |
| Battle of Ain Jalut | 1260 | Mongol invasions of the Levant | 21,000 |
| Battle of Kōan | 1281 | Mongol invasions of Japan | 150,000+ |
| Third battle of Bach Dang river | 1288 | Mongol invasion of Vietnam | 85,000 |
| Battle of Jaran Manjur | 1298 | Mongol invasions of India | 20,000+ |
| Battle of Yamen | 1279 | Mongol conquest of the Song dynasty | 100,000 |
| Battle of Kili | 1299 | Mongol invasion of India | 130,000 |
| Battle of Bapheus | 1302 | Byzantine–Ottoman wars | 3,000 |
| Battle of Amroha | 1305 | Mongol invasion of India | 34,000 |
| Battle of Bannockburn | 1314 | First War of Scottish Independence | 19,000 |
| Battle of Demotika | 1352 | Byzantine civil war of 1352–1357 | 8,000 |
| Battle of Vijaya | 1377 | Champa–Đại Việt War (1367–1390) | 95,000 |
| Battle of Kulikovo | 1380 | Great Troubles | 136,000 |
| Battle of Roosebeke | 1382 | Hundred Years' War | 27,600 |
| Battle of Maritsa | 1389 | Serbian-Ottoman wars | 57,000 |
| Battle of Kosovo | 1389 | Serbian-Ottoman wars | 60,000 |
| Battle of the Terek River | 1395 | Tokhtamysh–Timur war | 100,000 |
| Battle of Nicopolis | 1396 | Ottoman wars in Europe | 30,000 |
| Conquest of Delhi | 1398 | Timur's Indian campaign | 100,000 |
| Battle of Ankara | 1402 | Ottoman–Timur War | 15,000+ |
| Battle of Grunwald | 1410 | Polish–Lithuanian–Teutonic War | 13,000 |
| Battle of Agincourt | 1415 | Hundred Years' War | 14,000 |
| Battle of Tốt Động – Chúc Động | 1426 | Lam Sơn uprising | 30,000 |
| Battle of Hermannstadt | 1442 | Hungarian–Ottoman War (1437–1442) | 24,000 |
| Battle of Zlatitsa | 1443 | Crusade of Varna | 22,000+ |
| Battle of Varna | 1444 | Crusade of Varna | 60,000+ |
| Battle of Kosovo (1448) | 1448 | Ottoman–Wallachian wars / Ottoman–Hungarian wars | 27,000 |
| Tumu Crisis | 1449 | Ming–Mongol War | 200,000+ |
| Battle of Castillon | 1453 | Hundred Years' War | 4,000 |
| Battle of Chojnice | 1454 | Thirteen Years' War | 9,000 |
| Battle of Towton | 1461 | Wars of the Roses | 28,000 |
| Second Battle of St Albans | 1461 | Wars of the Roses | 2,000 |
| Night Attack at Târgoviște | 1462 | Wallachian-Ottoman Wars | 20,000 |
| Battle of Vaslui | 1475 | Moldavian-Ottoman Wars | 40,000+ |
| Battle of Valea Albă | 1476 | Moldavian–Ottoman Wars | 30,000+ |
| Battle of Breadfield | 1479 | Habsburg–Ottoman wars | 13,000+ |
| Battle of Kabul | 1504 | Campaigns of Babur | 20,000+ |
| Battle of Ravenna | 1512 | War of the League of Cambrai | 13,500 |
| Battle of Flodden | 1513 | War of the League of Cambrai | 15,500 |
| Battle of Chaldiran | 1514 | Ottoman–Persian Wars | 7,000 |
| Battle of Orsha | 1514 | Lithuanian–Muscovite War (1512-1522) | 21,000–45,000 |
| Battle of Marignano | 1515 | War of the League of Cambrai | 11,000–15,000 |
| Battle of Ridaniya | 1517 | Ottoman wars in the Near East | 13,000 |
| La Noche Triste | 1520 | Spanish conquest of the Aztec Empire | 4,800+ |
| Battle of Pavia | 1525 | Italian War of 1521–1526 | 13,000 |
| First Battle of Panipat | 1526 | Mughal Conquest | 20,000–50,000 |
| Battle of Mohács | 1526 | Ottoman–Hungarian wars | 30,000 |
| Battle of Sződfalva | 1527 | Hungarian campaign of 1527–1528 | 21,000 |
| Battle of Ghaghra | 1529 | Mughal Conquest | 13,000 |
| Battle of Gorjani | 1537 | Habsburg–Ottoman wars in Hungary (1526–1568) | 22,000 |
| Battle of Mühlberg | 1547 | Schmalkaldic War | 9,500 |
| Battle of Molodi | 1572 | Russo-Crimean Wars | 29,000–33,000 or 100,000 |
| Battle of Nagashino | 1575 | Sengoku period | 18,000 |
| Battle of Alcácer Quibir | 1578 | Moroccan–Portuguese conflicts | 19,000 |
| Battle of Gembloux | 1578 | Eighty Years' War | 6,000 |
| Battle of Chungju | 1592 | Japanese invasions of Korea (1592–1598) | 8,000–16,000 100,000 |
| Battle of Călugăreni | 1595 | Long War (Ottoman War) | 11,000–16,000 |
| Battle of Keresztes | 1596 | Long Turkish War | 30,000 |
| Battle of Sacheon | 1598 | Japanese invasions of Korea (1592–1598) | 30,000 |
| Battle of Sekigahara | 1600 | Sengoku period | 30,000+ |
| Battle of Nieuwpoort | 1600 | Eighty Years' War | 6,700+ |
| Battle of Kircholm | 1605 | Polish–Swedish War (1600–1611) | 8,400 |
| Battle of Klushino | 1610 | Polish–Muscovite War | 5,400 |
| Battle of Wisternitz | 1619 | Thirty Years' War | 6,700 |
| Battle of White Mountain | 1620 | Thirty Years' War | 3,450 |
| Battle of Shen-Liao | 1620 | Qing conquest of the Ming | 75,000 |
| Battle of Rohilla | 1621 | Early Mughal-Sikh Wars | 14,000 |
| Battle of Lutter | 1626 | Thirty Years' War | 9,700 |
| Battle of Wolgast | 1628 | Thirty Years' War | 3,100 |
| First Battle of Breitenfeld | 1631 | Thirty Years' War | 31,900 |
| Battle of Lahira | 1631 | Early Mughal-Sikh Wars | 36,773 |
| Battle of Fürth | 1632 | Thirty Years' War | 5,000 |
| Battle of Lützen | 1632 | Thirty Years' War | 11,160 |
| Battle of Amritsar | 1634 | Early Mughal-Sikh Wars | 7,000 |
| Battle of Nördlingen | 1634 | Thirty Years' War | 17,000 |
| Battle of Kartarpur | 1635 | Early Mughal-Sikh Wars | 50,700-97,000 |
| Battle of the Downs | 1639 | Eighty Years' War | 15,000+ |
| Battle of Song-Jin | 1641 | Qing conquest of the Ming | 60,000 |
| Second Battle of Breitenfeld | 1642 | Thirty Years' War | 14,000 |
| Battle of Rocroi | 1643 | Thirty Years' War | 19,000 |
| Battle of Freiburg | 1644 | Thirty Years' War | 12,000 |
| Battle of Jankau | 1645 | Thirty Years' War | 15,500 |
| Battle of Lens | 1648 | Thirty Years' War | 9,500 |
| Battle of Zusmarshausen | 1648 | Thirty Years' War | 5,000 |
| Battle of Berestechko | 1651 | Khmelnytsky Uprising | 30,000–40,000 |
| Battle of the Dunes | 1658 | Anglo-Spanish War (1654–1660) | 9,600 |
| Battle of Samugarh | 1658 | Mughal Conquest | 32,000 |
| Battle of Khajwa | 1659 | Mughal Conquest | 20,000 |
| Battle of Saint Gotthard | 1664 | Battle of Saint Gotthard | 12,000 |
| Battle of Khotyn (1673) | 1673 | Polish–Ottoman War (1672–1676) | 32,000 |
| Battle of Lund | 1676 | Scanian War | 14,000 |
| Battle of Vienna | 1683 | Ottoman–Habsburg wars | 19,500 |
| Battle of Mohács (1687) | 1687 | Ottoman–Habsburg wars | 12,500 |
| Battle of Fleurus | 1690 | War of the Grand Alliance | 10,600−28,000 |
| Battle of Slankamen | 1691 | Ottoman–Habsburg wars | 28,000 |
| Battle of Landen | 1693 | War of the Grand Alliance | 28,000 |
| Battle of Zenta | 1697 | Ottoman–Habsburg wars | 30,300 |
| Battle of Narva | 1700 | Great Northern War | 19,900 |
| Battle of Schellenberg | 1704 | War of the Spanish Succession | 11,000 |
| Battle of Blenheim | 1704 | War of the Spanish Succession | 32,000 |
| Battle of Chamkaur | 1705 | Mughal-Sikh Wars | 112,500 |
| Battle of Fraustadt | 1706 | Great Northern War | 16,500 |
| Battle of Ramillies | 1706 | War of the Spanish Succession | 15,600 |
| Battle of Almansa | 1707 | War of the Spanish Succession | 22,000 |
| Battle of Lesnaya | 1708 | Great Northern War | 11,000 |
| Battle of Poltava | 1709 | Great Northern War | 14,300 |
| Battle of Malplaquet | 1709 | War of the Spanish Succession | 95,000 |
| Battle of Helsingborg | 1710 | Great Northern War | 10,700 |
| Battle of Villaviciosa | 1710 | War of the Spanish Succession | 12,000 |
| Battle of Gulnabad | 1722 | Hotaki-Safavid War | 17,000 |
| Battle of Hohenfriedberg | 1745 | War of the Austrian Succession | 18,530 |
| Battle of Fontenoy | 1745 | War of the Austrian Succession | 14,000 |
| Battle of Lobositz | 1756 | Seven Years' War | 7,000+ |
| Battle of Leuthen | 1757 | Seven Years' War | 11,800 |
| Battle of Prague | 1757 | Seven Years' War | 27,570+ |
| Battle of Gross-Jägersdorf | 1757 | Seven Years' War | 10,000+ |
| Battle of Rossbach | 1757 | Seven Years' War | 10,000 |
| Battle of Breslau (1757) | 1757 | Seven Years' War | 12,000 |
| Battle of Zorndorf | 1758 | Seven Years' War | 30,000 |
| Battle of Krefeld | 1758 | Seven Years' War | 5,200 |
| Battle of Kunersdorf | 1759 | Seven Years' War | 35,000 |
| Battle of Minden | 1759 | Seven Years' War | 12,700 |
| Battle of Torgau | 1760 | Seven Years' War | 32,560+ |
| Third Battle of Panipat | 1761 | Marathas and Afghans | 129,000+ |
| Battle of Kup | 1762 | Afghan-Sikh Wars | 20,000 |
| Battle of Villinghausen | 1761 | Seven Years' War | 13,000+ |
| Battle of Freiberg | 1762 | Seven Years' War | 10,500 |
| Battle of Kagul | 1770 | Russo-Turkish War (1768–1774) | 21,000 |
| Battle of Porto Novo | 1781 | Second Anglo-Mysore War | 9306 |
| Battle of Rạch Gầm-Xoài Mút | 1785 | Siamese-Vietnamese Wars | 50,000 |
| Battle of Rymnik | 1789 | Russo-Turkish War (1787–1792) | 21,000 |
| Battle of Jemappes | 1792 | War of the First Coalition | 3,500 |
| Battle of Mardanpur | 1794 | Maratha and Patiala | 8,333-52,333 |
| Battle of Loano | 1795 | War of the First Coalition | 10,000 |
| Battle of Arcole | 1796 | War of the First Coalition | 11,000 |
| Battle of Rivoli | 1797 | War of the First Coalition | 17,500 |
| Battle of Trebbia | 1799 | War of the Second Coalition | 17,000–23,000 |
| Battle of Novi | 1799 | War of the Second Coalition | 19,500 |
| Battle of the Pyramids | 1798 | War of the Second Coalition | 10,000+ |
| Battle of Stockach | 1800 | War of the Second Coalition | 9,800 |
| Battle of Marengo | 1800 | War of the Second Coalition | 16,400 |
| Battle of Montebello | 1800 | War of the Second Coalition | 7,275 |
| Battle of Pozzolo | 1800 | War of the Second Coalition | 13,000+ |
| Battle of Höchstädt | 1800 | War of the Second Coalition | 7,000 |
| Battle of Hohenlinden | 1800 | War of the Second Coalition | 16,000+ |
| Ulm campaign | 1805 | War of the Third Coalition | 62,000 |
| Battle of Dürenstein | 1805 | War of the Third Coalition | 10,000 |
| Battle of Austerlitz | 1805 | War of the Third Coalition | 45,300 |
| Battle of Schöngrabern | 1805 | War of the Third Coalition | 5,000 |
| Battle of Jena–Auerstedt | 1806 | War of the Fourth Coalition | 52,000, including prisoners later killed |
| Battle of Lübeck | 1806 | War of the Fourth Coalition | 18,800 |
| Battle of Eylau | 1807 | War of the Fourth Coalition | 40,000 |
| Battle of Friedland | 1807 | War of the Fourth Coalition | 28,000–50,000 |
| Battle of Bailen | 1808 | Peninsular War | 21,000 |
| Battle of Espinosa de los Monteros | 1808 | Peninsular War | 6,600 |
| Battle of Gamonal | 1808 | Peninsular War | 3,600 |
| Battle of Aspern-Essling | 1809 | War of the Fifth Coalition | 42,900 |
| Battle of Landshut | 1809 | War of the Fifth Coalition | 9,000 |
| Battle of Eckmühl | 1809 | War of the Fifth Coalition | 13,700 |
| Battle of Abensberg | 1809 | War of the Fifth Coalition | 8,200 |
| Battle of Ebelsberg | 1809 | War of the Fifth Coalition | 15,340 |
| Battle of Piave River | 1809 | War of the Fifth Coalition | 7,000 |
| Battle of Wagram | 1809 | War of the Fifth Coalition | 77,000–79,000 |
| Battle of Znaim | 1809 | War of the Fifth Coalition | 9,000 |
| Battle of Raab | 1809 | War of the Fifth Coalition | 14,300 |
| Battle of Talavera | 1809 | Peninsular War | 13,900 |
| Battle of Somosierra | 1808 | Peninsular War | 2,500 |
| Battle of Bussaco | 1810 | Peninsular War | 5,900 |
| Battle of Slobozia | 1811 | Russo-Turkish War (1806–1812) | 20,000 |
| Battle of Salamanca | 1812 | Peninsular War | 18,800 |
| Battle of Smolensk | 1812 | French invasion of Russia | 24,000 |
| Battle of Shevardino | 1812 | French invasion of Russia | 10,000 |
| Battle of Borodino | 1812 | French invasion of Russia | 74,000 |
| Second Battle of Polotsk | 1812 | French invasion of Russia | 22,000 |
| Battle of Maloyaroslavets | 1812 | French invasion of Russia | 16,000 |
| Battle of Vyazma | 1812 | French invasion of Russia | 9,500 |
| Battle of Wolkowisk | 1812 | French invasion of Russia | 6,000 |
| Battle of Krasnoi | 1812 | French invasion of Russia | 28,000 |
| Battle of Berezina | 1812 | French invasion of Russia | 60,000 |
| Battle of Vitoria | 1813 | Peninsular War | 13,000 |
| Battle of Lützen | 1813 | War of the Sixth Coalition | 31,155–52,000 |
| Battle of Bautzen | 1813 | War of the Sixth Coalition | 45,000 |
| Battle of Hanau | 1813 | War of the Sixth Coalition | 15,000 |
| Battle of Dresden | 1813 | War of the Sixth Coalition | 48,000 |
| Battle of Wartenburg | 1813 | War of the Sixth Coalition | 4,000 |
| Battle of Großbeeren | 1813 | War of the Sixth Coalition | 5,000 |
| Battle of Dennewitz | 1813 | War of the Sixth Coalition | 33,000 |
| Battle of Leipzig | 1813 | War of the Sixth Coalition | 124,000 |
| Battle of Orthez | 1814 | Peninsular War | 5,100 |
| Battle of Arcis-sur-Aube | 1814 | War of the Sixth Coalition | 8,000 |
| Battle of Wavre | 1815 | Hundred Days | 5,000 |
| Battle of Quatre Bras | 1815 | Hundred Days | 10,000 |
| Battle of Ligny | 1815 | Hundred Days | 28,000 |
| Battle of Waterloo | 1815 | Hundred Days | 47,000+ (not including prisoners and missing) |
| Battle of Tolentino | 1815 | Neapolitan War | 5,000 |
| Battle of Ayacucho | 1824 | Peruvian War of Independence | 3,400+ |
| Battle of Jamrud | 1837 | Afghan-Sikh Wars | 11,000+ |
| Battle of Inkerman | 1854 | Crimean War | 15,857 |
| Battle of Choloki | 1854 | Crimean War | 5,500 |
| Battle of Kurekdere | 1854 | Crimean War | 3,409 |
| Battle of Alma | 1854 | Crimean War | 9,100+ |
| Battle of Magenta | 1859 | Second Italian War of Independence | 14,900+ |
| Battle of Solferino | 1859 | Second Italian War of Independence | 39,500+ |
| Battle of Jiangnan | 1860 | Taiping Rebellion | 140,000+ |
| First Battle of Bull Run | 1861 | American Civil War | 4,690 |
| Battle of Shiloh | 1862 | American Civil War | 24,000 |
| Battle of Antietam | 1862 | American Civil War | 23,000–26,193 |
| Battle of Fredericksburg | 1862 | American Civil War | 17,300–17,962 |
| Battle of Richmond | 1862 | American Civil War | 5,900+ |
| Battle of Gaines' Mill | 1863 | American Civil War | 15,000+ |
| Battle of Gettysburg | 1863 | American Civil War | 51,000 |
| Battle of Salem Church | 1863 | American Civil War | 9,500+ |
| Battle of Chickamauga | 1863 | American Civil War | 34,624 |
| Battle of Spotsylvania Court House | 1864 | American Civil War | 30,000 |
| Battle of Stones River | 1862–1863 | American Civil War | 24,000 |
| Battle of the Wilderness | 1864 | American Civil War | 28,700 |
| Battle of Cold Harbor | 1864 | American Civil War | 18,000 |
| Battle of Changzhou | 1864 | Taiping Rebellion | 35,000 |
| Battle of Hubei | 1864 | Taiping Rebellion | 60,000+ |
| Battle of Königgrätz | 1866 | Austro-Prussian War | 47,500 |
| Battle of Münchengrätz | 1866 | Austro-Prussian War | 3,000 |
| Battle of Tuyutí | 1866 | Paraguayan War | 7,000–16,000 |
| Battle of Curupayty | 1866 | Paraguayan War | 4,300 |
| Battle of Ytororó | 1868 | Paraguayan War | 3,300+ |
| Battle of Acosta Ñu | 1869 | Paraguayan War | 5,102 |
| Battle of Piribebuy | 1869 | Paraguayan War | 2,210 |
| Battle of Mars-la-Tour/Battle of Gravelotte | 1870 | Franco-Prussian War | 34,000 |
| Battle of Sedan | 1870 | Franco-Prussian War | 26,000 |
| Second Battle of Orleans | 1870 | Franco-Prussian War | 8,740 |
| Battle of Le Mans | 1871 | Franco-Prussian War | 30,000 |
| Battle of Tabaruzaka | 1877 | Satsuma Rebellion | 8,400 |
| Battle of Isandlwana | 1879 | Anglo-Zulu War | 6,300 |
| Battle of Kambula | 1879 | Anglo-Zulu War | 2,134 |
| Battle of Arica | 1880 | War of the Pacific | 3,600+ |
| Battle of Adwa | 1896 | First Italo-Ethiopian War | 17,300 |
| Battle of Binakayan-Dalahican | 1896 | Philippine Revolutionary War | 2,000–15,000 |
| Battle of Omdurman | 1898 | Mahdist War | 20,430 |
| Battle of Sakarya | 1921 | Greco–Turkish War of 1919–22 | 61,000 |

== Raids and sacks ==
| Action | Year | Conflict | Casualties |
|---|---|---|---|
| Sack of Rome (455) | 455 | Fall of the Western Roman Empire | 400,000+ |
| Sack of Thessalonica (1185) | 1185 | Third Norman invasion of the Balkans | 10,000+ |
| Sack of Berwick (1296) | 1296 | First War of Scottish Independence | 17,000 |
| Sack of Rome (1527) | 1527 | War of the League of Cognac | 48,000 |
| Raid on the Bay of Naples (1544) | 1544 | Ottoman–Habsburg wars | 50,000 |
| Fire of Moscow (1571) | 1571 | Russo-Turkish Wars | 60,000-120,000 |
| Sack of Magdeburg | 1631 | Thirty Years' War | 26,900 |
| Raid on the Medway | 1667 | Second Anglo-Dutch War | 650 |
| Sand Creek Massacre | 1864 | American Indian Wars | 600 |
| Rape of Nanking | 1937 | World War II | 300,000 |
| Dieppe Raid | 1942 | World War II | 6,860 |

== Naval battles ==
| Battle or Action | Year | Conflict | Casualties |
|---|---|---|---|
| Battle of the Delta | 1179 BC | Late Bronze Age collapse | 5,000-10,000 |
| Battle of Salamis | 480 BC | Second Persian invasion of Greece | 50,000 |
| Battle of Cape Ecnomus | 256 BC | First Punic War | 50,000 |
| Battle of Actium | 31 BC | War of Actium | 7,500 |
| Battle of Cape Bon | 468 | Vandal War | 10,000 |
| Battle of the Masts | 655 | Arab–Byzantine wars | 20,000 |
| Battle of Dan-no-ura | 1185 | Genpei War | 20,000 |
| Battle of Yamen | 1279 | Song-Yuan Wars | 110,000 |
| Third battle of Bach Dang river | 1288 | Mongol invasion of Vietnam | 85,000 |
| Battle of Lake Poyang | 1363 | Red Turban Rebellion | 600,000 |
| Battle of Chaul | 1508 | Mamluk–Portuguese conflicts | 840 |
| Battle of Djerba | 1560 | Spanish–Ottoman wars | 10,000 |
| Battle of Lepanto | 1571 | Ottoman–Habsburg wars | 40,000 |
| Battle of Ponta Delgada | 1582 | War of the Portuguese Succession | 3,550 |
| Battle of São Vicente | 1583 | Eighty Years' War | 166 |
| Battle of Solebay | 1672 | Third Anglo-Dutch War | 3,100 |
| Battles of Barfleur and La Hougue | 1692 | Nine Years' War | 10,000 |
| Battle of Pondicherry | 1759 | Seven Years' War | 1,589 |
| Battle of Chesma | 1770 | Russo-Turkish War (1768–1774) | 12,000 |
| Battle of Dogger Bank | 1781 | Fourth Anglo-Dutch War | 988 |
| Battle of Vyborg Bay | 1790 | Russo-Swedish War (1788–1790) | 6,000–12,000 |
| Battle of the Nile | 1798 | French campaign in Egypt and Syria | 8,997 |
| Battle of Copenhagen | 1801 | War of the Second Coalition | 2,800 |
| Battle of Trafalgar | 1805 | War of the Third Coalition | 4,853 |
| Battle of Navarino | 1827 | Greek War of Independence | 6,000 |
| Battle of Sinop | 1853 | Crimean War | 3,366 |
| Battle of Hampton Roads | 1862 | American Civil War | 392 |
| Battle of Riachuelo | 1865 | Paraguayan War | 997 |
| Battle of the Yalu River | 1894 | First Sino-Japanese War | 1,730 |
| Battle of the Yellow Sea | 1904 | Russo-Japanese War | 566 |
| Battle of Tsushima | 1905 | Russo-Japanese War | 5,162 |
| Battle of Lemnos | 1913 | First Balkan War | 146 |
| Battle of Coronel | 1914 | World War I | 1,660 |
| Battle of the Falkland Islands | 1914 | World War I | 1,900 |
| Battle of Dogger Bank | 1915 | World War I | 1,081 |
| Battle of Jutland | 1916 | World War I | 12,000 |
| Battle of Cape Machichaco | 1937 | Spanish Civil War | 35 |
| Battle of Cape Palos | 1938 | Spanish Civil War | 765 |
| Battle of the River Plate | 1939 | World War II | 196 |
| Attack on Mers-el-Kébir | 1940 | World War II | 1,669 |
| Operation Juno | 1940 | World War II | 1,662 |
| Last battle of Bismarck | 1941 | World War II | 2,249 |
| Battle of Cape Matapan | 1941 | World War II | 2,303 |
| Battle of Cape Bon | 1941 | World War II | 817 |
| Battle of the Java Sea | 1942 | World War II | 2,336 |
| Battle of Midway | 1942 | World War II | 3,364 |
| Battle of Santa Cruz Islands | 1942 | World War II | 766 |
| Battle of Savo Island | 1942 | World War II | 1217 |
| Naval Battle of Casablanca | 1942 | World War II | 636 |
| Battle of the Bismarck Sea | 1943 | World War II | 2,903 |
| Battle of Leyte Gulf | 1944 | World War II | 15,500 |
| Battle of San Carlos | 1982 | Falklands War | 65 |

== See also ==
- Lists of death tolls
  - Casualties of the Iraq War – Casualties of conflict from 2003 to 2011
  - Deadliest single days of World War I
  - List of wars by death toll
  - United States military casualties of war – Military personnel casualties of the United States
- List of terrorist incidents
- List of wars – Overview of and topical guide to war
  - Lists of battles
  - List of invasions – List of military invasions

== Bibliography ==
- Oleynikov, А. (2016). Россия-щит Антанты [Russia-shield of the Entente] (in Russian). Foreword by Nikolai Starikov. St. Petersburg: Piter. ISBN 978-5-496-01795-4.
- Beevor, Antony (2009). D-Day: The Battle for Normandy. New York; Toronto: Viking. ISBN 978-0-670-02119-2.
- Boog, Horst; Krebs, Gerhard; Vogel, Detlef (2001), Das Deutsche Reich in der Defensive Strategischer Luftkrieg in Europa, Krieg im Westen und in Ostasien 1943 bis 1944/45 [The Strategic Air War in Europe and the War in the West and East Asia 1943–1944/5], Das Deutsche Reich und die Zweite Weltkrieg (in German), vol. 7, Deutsche Verlags-Anstalt, ISBN 978-3-421-05507-1
- Brewer, Paul (2007). The Chronicle of War: A Year-by-Year Account of Conflict from 1854 to the Present Day. London: Carlton Books. ISBN 978-1-74181-342-5.
- Chapuis, Oscar (1995). A history of Vietnam: from Hong Bang to Tu Duc. Greenwood Publishing Group. ISBN 0-313-29622-7.
- Erickson, John (2001). Hitler versus Stalin: The Second World War on the Eastern Front in Photographs. London: Carlton Books. ISBN 1-84222-260-0.
- Giangreco, Dennis; Moore, Kathryn; Polmar, Norman (2004). Eyewitness D-Day: Firsthand Accounts from the Landing at Normandy to the Liberation of Paris. New York: Barnes & Noble. ISBN 978-0-7607-5045-2.
- Glantz, David M. (1998). When Titans Clashed: How the Red Army Stopped Hitler. University Press of Kansas. ISBN 0-7006-0899-0.
- Goldsworthy, Adrian (2010). Antony and Cleopatra. London: Weidenfeld & Nicolson. ISBN 978-0-297-86104-1.
- Goodman, Anthony (1981). Wars of the Roses: Military Activity and English Society, 1452–97. London: Routledge & Kegan Paul. ISBN 0-7100-0728-0.
- Grant, R. G. (2005). Battle: A Visual Journey Through 5,000 Years of Combat. Dorling Kindersley. ISBN 0-7566-1360-4.
- Hassig, Ross (1994). Mexico and the Spanish Conquest. New York: Longman. ISBN 978-0-8061-3793-3.
- Krivosheev, G. F. (1997). Soviet Casualties and Combat Losses in the Twentieth Century. Greenhill Books. ISBN 1-85367-280-7.
- Mann, Charles (2005). 1491: New Revelations of the Americas Before Columbus. New York: Vintage Books. ISBN 978-1-4000-3205-1. "1491: New Revelations."
- Tucker, Spencer, ed. (2005). Encyclopedia of World War I. Vol. 4. ABC-CLIO. ISBN 1-85109-420-2.
- Trần Trọng Kim (1971). Việt Nam sử lược (in Vietnamese). Saigon: Center for School Materials.
- Tucker, Spencer C (2009). A Global Chronology of Conflict: From the Ancient World to the Modern Middle East 6V: A Global Chronology of Conflict [6 volumes]. ABC-CLIO. ISBN 978-1-85109-667-1.
- Wagner, Margaret; Kennedy, D. M.; Osborne, L. B.; Reyburn, S. (2007). The Library of Congress World War II Companion. Simon & Schuster. ISBN 978-0-7432-5219-5.
- Whitmarsh, Andrew (2009). D-Day in Photographs. Stroud: History Press. ISBN 978-0-7524-5095-7.
- 《White blood-red》 Zhang Zhenglong PLA Publishing House in August 1989 ISBN 7-01-000381-5/ISBN 7-01-000413-7
- Liaoning-Shenyang Campaign
- Alistair Horne (1977). A Savage War of Peace: Algeria 1954–1962. New York Review of Books. ISBN 1-59017-218-3.
- James Grant Duff (2001). A history of the Mahrattas (3 volumes). Yokai Publishing. ISBN 0-85792-462-1.
- H. R. G Rawlinson (2006). An account of the last battle of Panipat, and the events leading to it. Hesperides Publishing. ISBN 978-1-4067-2625-1.
- Hall, Richard C. (2000). The Balkan Wars, 1912–1913: Prelude to the First World War. Routledge. ISBN 0-415-22946-4.
