= Mesopotamia (Roman province) =

Province of the Roman Empire

Coordinates: 37°N 41°E

Provincia Mesopotamia ἐπαρχία Μεσοποταμίας
- Province of the Roman Empire
- 116–117; 198–637
- Provincia Mesopotamia within the Roman Empire.
- Capital: Amida (Diyarbakır) / Dara (Oğuz) / Nisibis (Nusaybin)
- Historical era: Antiquity
  - Established by Trajan: 116
  - Evacuated by Hadrian: 117
  - Re-established by Septimius Severus: 198
  - Muslim conquests: 637
Preceded by	Succeeded by
Parthian Empire	Rashidun Caliphate
- Today part of: Iraq; Turkey; Syria; Kuwait

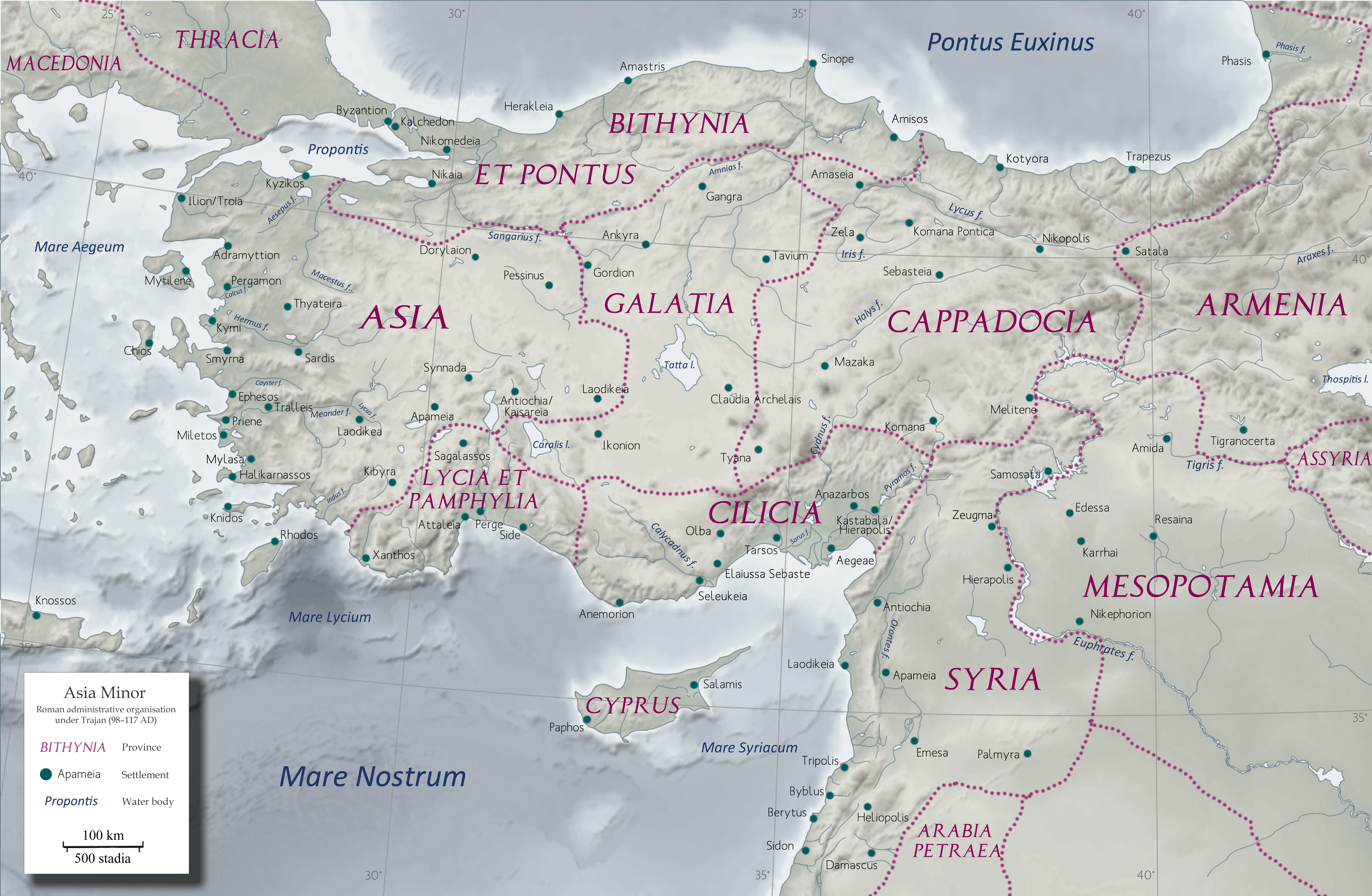
The Roman provinces of the East under Trajan, including Mesopotamia.

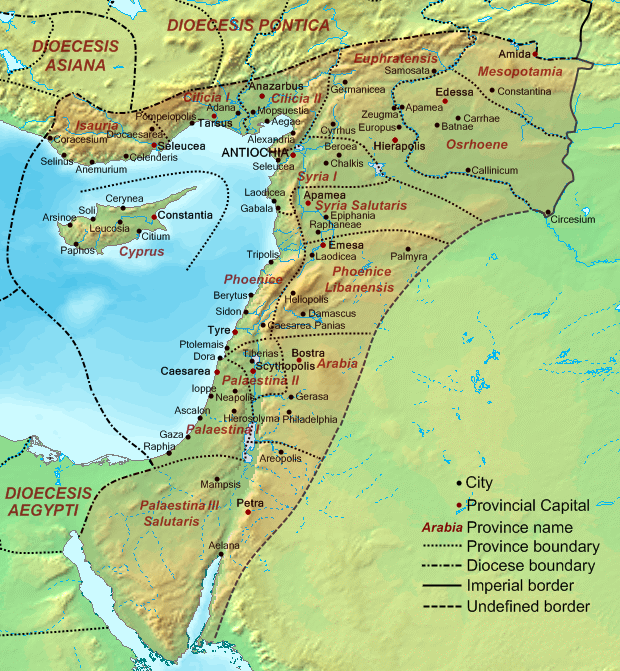
The late Roman Diocese of the East, including the province of Mesopotamia

Mesopotamia was a Roman province, initially a short-lived creation of the Roman emperor Trajan in 116–117 and then re-established by Emperor Septimius Severus in c. 198. Control of the province was subsequently fought over between the Roman and the Eranshahr empires until the Muslim conquests of the 7th century.

== Trajan's province ==
In 113, the Roman emperor Trajan (r. 98–117) launched a war against Rome's long-time eastern rival, the Parthian Empire. In 114, he conquered Armenia, which was made into a province, and by the end of 115, he had conquered northern Mesopotamia. This too was organized as a province in early 116, when coins were minted to celebrate the fact.

Later in the same year, Trajan marched into central and southern Mesopotamia (enlarging and completing the province of Mesopotamia) and across the river Tigris to Adiabene, which he annexed into another Roman province, Assyria. But he did not stop there. In the last months of 116, he captured the Persian city of Susa and deposed the Parthian king Osroes I, putting his own puppet ruler Parthamaspates on the Parthian throne. Never again would the Roman Empire advance so far to the east.

As soon as Trajan died, however, his successor Hadrian (r. 117–138) relinquished his conquests east of the Euphrates river, which became again the Roman Empire's eastern boundary.

== Severus's province ==
=== Lucius Verus's campaign ===
Northern Mesopotamia, including Osroene, came again under Roman control in the expedition of Lucius Verus in 161–166, but were not formally organized into provinces; instead, they were left under local vassal rulers, although Roman garrisons were maintained, notably at Nisibis.

=== Year of the Five Emperors ===
This control was threatened in 195, during the civil war between Septimius Severus (r. 193–211) and the usurper Pescennius Niger, when rebellions broke out in the area, and Nisibis was besieged. Severus quickly restored order and organized Osroene as a full province.

=== Reconquest by Severus ===
Next, Severus embarked on a war against Parthia, which he concluded successfully with the sack of the Parthian capital Ctesiphon. In emulation of Trajan, he re-established a province of Mesopotamia in 198, with Nisibis, elevated to the status of a full colonia, as its capital.

Unlike Trajan's province, which encompassed the whole of Roman-occupied Mesopotamia between the Euphrates and Tigris rivers, the new province was limited between the province of Osroene to the south, the Euphrates and Tigris to the north, and the river Chaboras (modern Khabur) to the east.

=== Border conflict ===
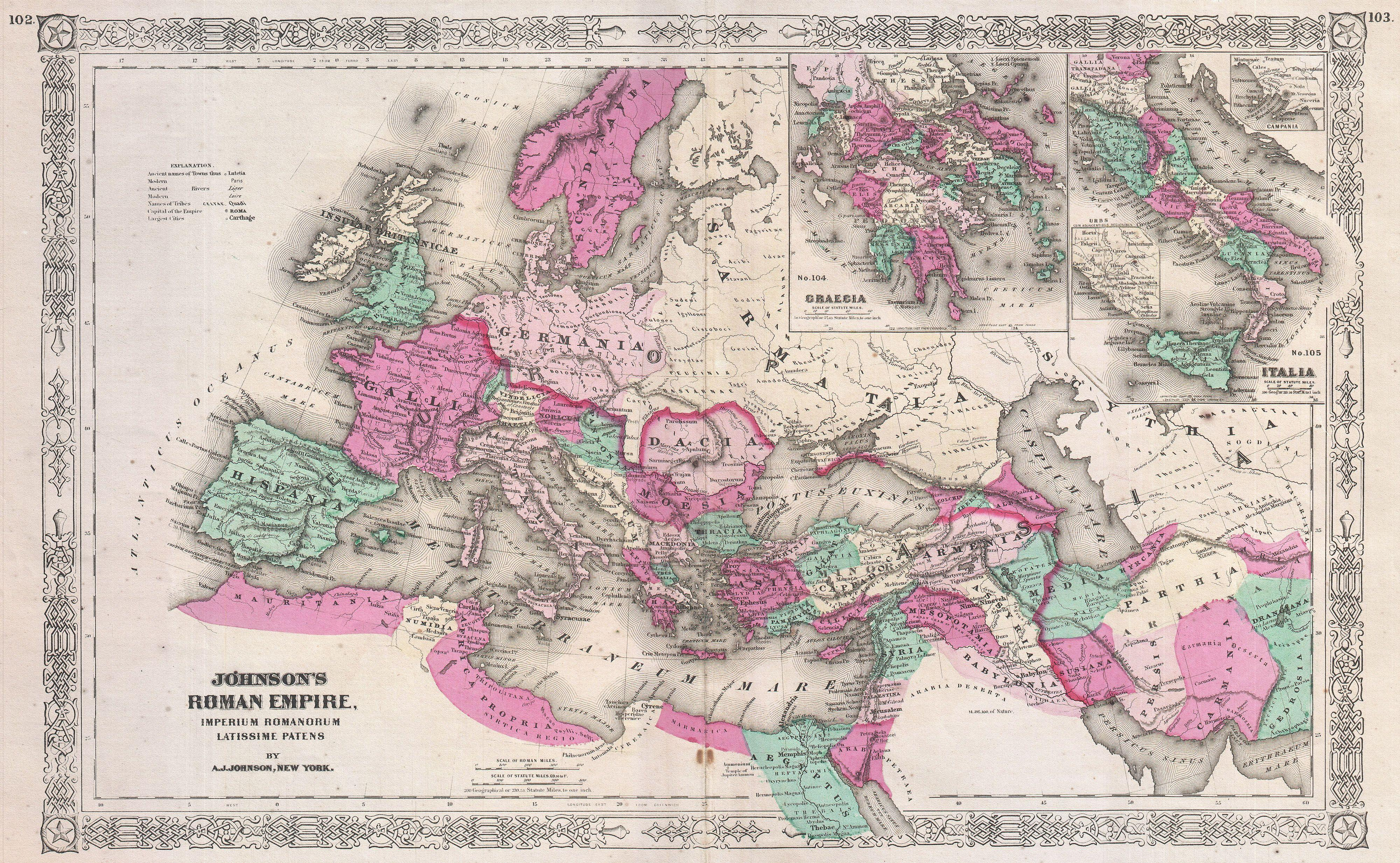
Map showing the Mesopotamia province

For the remainder of its existence, the province would remain a bone of contention between the Romans and their eastern neighbors, suffering heavily in the recurrent Roman–Persian Wars. In the turmoil that followed the Year of the Six Emperors, in 239–243, Ardashir I (r. 224–241), the founder of the new Sassanid Empire which replaced the moribund Parthians, attacked and overran the area, but it was recovered by Timesitheus before his death in 243. In the 250s, the Persian shah Shapur I (r. ca. 240–270) attacked Mesopotamia, and fought with the Roman emperor Valerian (r. 253–260), whom he captured at Edessa in 260. In the next year, however, Odaenathus of Palmyra took a stand against Shapur, who eventually retreated.

== Diocletianic-Constantinian reorganization ==
Under the reforms of Diocletian (r. 284–305) and Constantine I (r. 306–337), it became part of the Diocese of the East, which in turn was subordinated to the praetorian prefecture of the East.

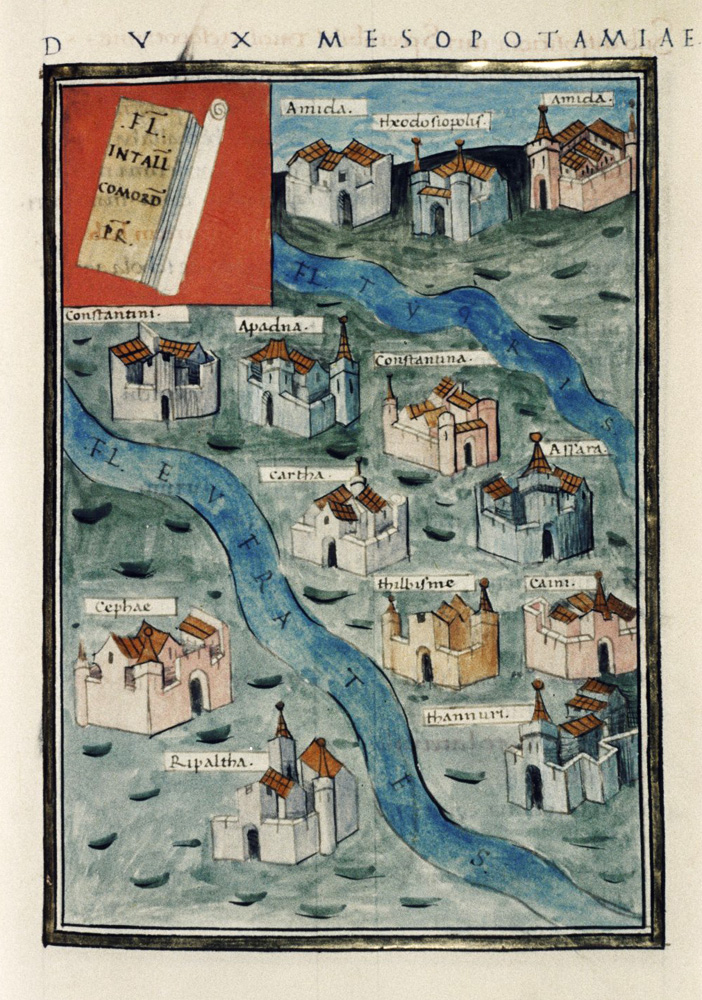
Map of Roman military stations in Mesopotamia from a 1436 manuscript

Nisibis and Singara, along with the territory in Adiabene conquered by Diocletian were lost after the debacle of Julian's Persian expedition in 363, and the capital was transferred to Amida, while the seat of the military commander, the dux Mesopotamiae, was located at Constantina. Other cities included Martyropolis and Kephas.

The attendance list of the First Council of Nicaea lists the bishops of Edessa, Nisibis, Rhesaina, Makedonopolis and Fars, whereas by the time of the council of Constantinople in 381 the bishoprics included were those of Amida, Constantina and Amaria.

== Late Roman/Early Byzantine Mesopotamia ==
After the troubles Roman forces faced in the Anastasian War of 502–506, the East Roman emperor Anastasius I (r. 491–518) built the fortress of Dara as a counter to Nisibis and as the new base of the dux Mesopotamiae.

During the reforms of Justinian I (r. 527–565), the province was split up: the northern districts with Martyropolis went to the new province of Armenia IV, while the remainder was divided into two civil and ecclesiastical districts, one (the region south of the Tigris) with capital at Amida and the other (the region of Tur Abdin) with capital at Dara. The see of Amida was listed with eight suffragan bishoprics (Martyropolis, Iggilon, Bolebtina, Arsamosata, Beth Sophanaia, Qidarizon, Hesen Kepha, Zugmatos) while the see of Dara had only three (Reshaina, Tur Abdin, Menasobion) according to the Notitia Antiochena from the 580s. The region around Tur Abdin became a monastic hotspot (including for instance the monastery of Qarṭmin) as well as the center of the Syrian Orthodox world for the coming centuries.

The province suffered greatly during the near-constant wars with Persia in the 6th century. In 573, the Persians even took Dara, although the East Romans recovered it under the peace of 591. They lost it again to the Persians in the great war of 602–628, and regained it afterwards only to lose the entire region permanently to the Muslim conquests in 633–640.

== See also ==
- History of Mesopotamia
