= Shapur I's first Roman campaign =

Part of the Roman-Sasanian wars in 240–244 CE

- Part of the Roman-Sasanian wars
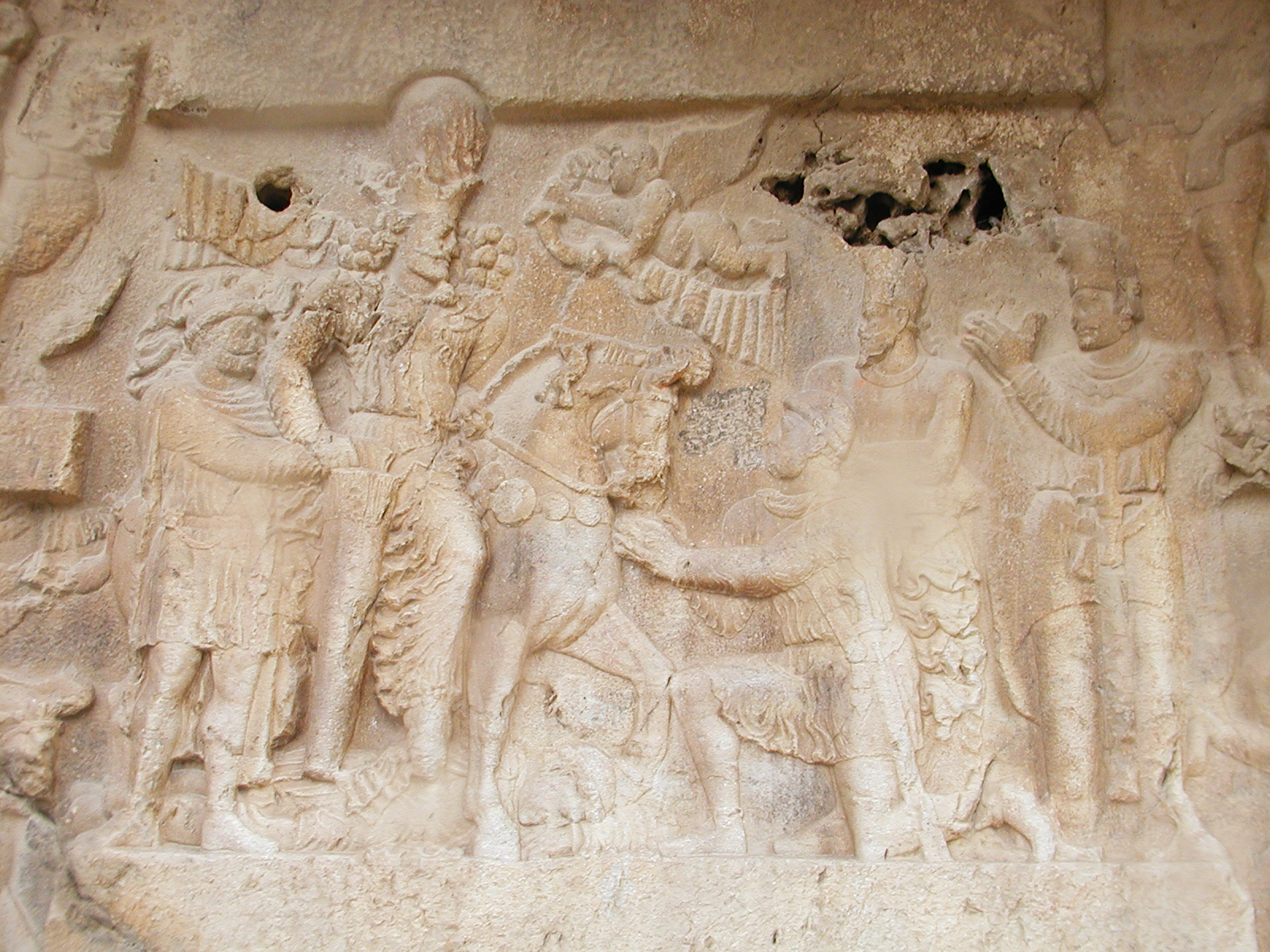
- Relief at Bishapur celebrating the victory of Shapur I over the Romans at Misiche: Gordian III is trampled by the Sassanid king's horse, while Philip the Arab is held tight by Shapur.
Date	240–244 AD
Location	Mesopotamia, Armenia and Osroene
Result	Sasanian victory
Territorial changes	The Sasanian Empire conquers Armenia and Mesopotamia

Belligerents
Roman Empire	Sasanian Empire

Commanders and leaders
Gordian III †	Shapur I

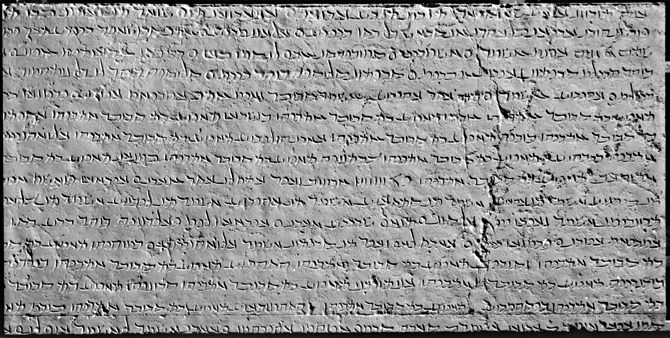
Parthian version of Shapur's trilingual inscription at Naqsh-e Rustam

Shapur I's first Roman campaign was the first of three victorious campaigns that the Persian king Shapur I led against the Roman Empire in 240–244, 252–256 and 260.

== Background ==
The Sasanian dynasty overthrew the Parthian Arsacid dynasty in 224. Shapur I's father, Ardashir I, the founder of the Sasanian dynasty, began an aggressive policy towards the Roman Empire. He led two campaigns against the Roman Empire, the first one ended inconclusively but the second one ended victoriously with the fall of several Roman cities, including Nisibis, Carrhae and, most importantly, Hatra.

== The war ==
In 240, Shapur I attacked the Roman Empire which provoked a response from Emperor Gordian III who mounted a counter-attack with a powerful army. Initially victorious, the Roman forces routed the Persian army at the battle of Resaena. However, the following year, the Persian forces faced a Roman army composed of Roman legionaries as well as units made up of Goth and Germanic warriors and decisively defeated it with Gordian III being killed during the Battle of Misiche. The battle is mentioned on Shapur's trilingual inscription at Naqsh-e Rustam. After the defeat and death of Gordian III, the new Roman Emperor, Philip the Arab, signed a "disgraceful" treaty with the Sasanian Empire, surrendering Mesopotamia and Armenia to them. Strangely enough, Philip the Arab celebrated, describing himself as victorious over the Persians once he was at a safe distance from them, but paid 500,000 denarii to the Persians in a peace settlement.

== See also ==
- Sasanian campaign of Gordian III
