= Gaius Furius Sabinius Aquila Timesitheus =

Roman official, soldier and praetorian prefect (190-243)

Vir Eminentissimus Gaius Furius Sabinius Aquila Timesitheus
- Born: 190
- Died: 243; Provincia Mesopotamiae
- Occupations: Imperial Official and soldier
- Years active: AD 210(?)-243
- Organization: Imperial Administration
- Known for: Fiscal expertise and generalship
- Title: Praefectus Praetorio (under Gordian III)
- Term: 240-3 AD
- Predecessor: Domitius
- Successor: M. Julius Philippus (later Emperor 'Philip the Arab'
- Children: Furia Sabinia Tranquillina
- Relatives: The Emperor Gordian III (son-in-law)

Gaius Furius Sabinius Aquila Timesitheus (Note: Zosimus refers to Timesitheus as Timesikles or Timesokles. He may merely have made an error in transcribing his source(s). The Scriptores Historiae Augustae (SHA) calls him Misitheus. This could also be an uncomplicated error, but, might possibly be an instance of the malicious humour in which the author of those unreliable, but indispensable Imperial biographies so often indulged. However, the SHA account of Timesitheus is beyond fulsome in its praise for his wisdom and learning, his care for his young son-in-law, the Emperor Gordian III, and his administration of the Empire.) (Greek: Τιμησίθεος) (AD 190-243) was an officer of the Roman Imperial government in the first half of the 3rd century. Most likely of Oriental-Greek origins, he was a Roman citizen, probably of equestrian rank.

He began his career in the Imperial Service as the commander of a cohort of auxiliary infantry and rose to become Praetorian Prefect, the highest office in the Imperial hierarchy, with both civilian and military functions. His official life was spent mainly in fiscal postings and he typified the powerful procuratorial functionaries (Note: See Equites and Procurator (Roman).) who came to dominate the Imperial government in the second quarter of the Third Century. Although he was on several occasions appointed to positions that contemporary Administrative Law reserved for officials of senatorial rank, he remained an equestrian until his death; it is possible that he deliberately avoided adlection to the Roman Senate, preferring to exercise power in offices from which senators were excluded.

He either died of illness or was murdered in the course of a successful campaign against the Sasanians under king Shapur I in Mesopotamia.

== Origins and social status ==
"Timesitheus" is a cognomen which suggests that the bearer was ethnically a Greek. However, Timesitheus's praenomen and nomen (i.e. "Gaius" and "Furius Sabinius" respectively) indicate long-established Roman citizenship and a family that was well-integrated into the élite classes of the Empire although it is otherwise unknown. Such enthusiasm to be associated with the Imperial power was not unknown in the case of ambitious Greek families. (Note: Such tendencies seem to have been particularly pronounced among the Greeks of Asia and the Oriens. The Greeks of Achaea (particularly Athens) may have been more concerned to emphasise their pre-Roman heritage and cultural distinction) His origins could have been anywhere in the eastern provinces where Greek, rather than Latin, was the dominant culture. Somewhere in Asia Minor is a possibility. However, as will be seen, his early career supports the notion that he may have had some connection to the Severan Dynasty, in particular the "Syrian Princesses". (Note: The term "Syrian Princesses" refers to three powerful women originating in Emesa (i.e. Homs, Syria). They included Julia Maesa, the Elder sister of Julia Domna, wife of the Emperor Septimius Severus, and her daughters Julia Soaemias and Julia Mamaea, who were themselves mothers of the Emperors Elagabalus and Alexander Severus respectively.) This could indicate that his origins were in the Oriens - i.e. the modern Levant /Arabia.

Despite the obscurity of his family background, his reputation and his achievements suggest that he benefitted from an excellent classical education. (Note: Zosimus calls him "... a man high in estimation for his learning ...." (Zos. Hist I, 17.2.). The SHA is also very laudatory - see below.) His parents were almost certainly wealthy and, most likely, of equestrian status.

== Career ==
=== Early days ===
Timesitheus' career before his appointment as Praetorian Prefect is recorded on an inscription on a statue from Lugdunum in the province of Gallia Lugdunensis (Lyon, France).

Late in the reign of Septimius Severus, or during the reign of Caracalla, Timesitheus was Prefect of Cohors I Gallicae in the province of Hispania Tarraconensis (Mediterranean Spain). This appointment was a typical first step for an equestrian seeking a career in the imperial service under the so-called Tres militiae system. Under that system Timesitheus might have been expected to go on to two additional junior military prefectures, firstly of a legionary cohort and then of an ala (Roman cavalry unit). Only then would most aspiring equestrian functionaries have been considered eligible for appointment as a procurator (financial administrator), the usual first step to high office in the Equestrian Service. However, Timesitheus seems to have missed out these two stages in the equestrian cursus and is next recorded as the Procurator Rationis Privatae (superintendent of the private properties of the Imperial Family) in the provinces of Belgica (north-east Gaul),Germania Inferior (the northern section of the Roman-controlled Rhineland) and Germania Superior (the southern section of the Roman Rhineland). (Note: The lands directly owned by the Severan Dynasty in north east Gaul and the Germanies - as throughout the Empire - are likely to have been substantially increased by Septimius Severus's victory in the civil wars of the 190s and the subsequent confiscations of the property of his defeated enemies and their supporters. This would have increased the demand for expert estate managers such as Timesitheus to administer these acquisitions and maximize the revenues derived from them.) He probably held this office under Caracalla. (Note: It is possible that Timesitheus's appointment to these offices related to Caracalla's war against the peoples of southern Germany (213 AD), for which much money would have been required, but there is no evidence to support this proposition.) This position carried the equestrian rank of sexagenarius, indicating that he had thus became a member of that class of equestrian functionaries who were paid a nominal salary of 60,000ss/annum. (Note: Concerning the salary-defined equestrian ranks of sexagenarius, centenarius, etc. see Equites.)

His next recorded appointment was as Procurator provinciae Arabiae (financial administrator of the province of Arabia Petraea). With this posting Timesitheus became a centenarius (nominal salary 100,000ss/annum). In addition to his procuratorship he also served on two occasions (218 and 222 AD)) as vice praeses of the province - i.e., he acted as its governor (in place of a senatorial legatus). In this capacity he would have commanded Legio III Cyrenaica. (Note: Under prevailing Administrative Law established during the reign of the Emperor Augustus the government of provinces with legionary garrisons was reserved for men of senatorial status. (In the case of provincial Arabiae the senator would have been of praetorian rank - i.e., yet to hold a consulate). However, an Emperor could over-ride this requirement and appoint an equestrian as a temporary expedient if he saw fit. Such appointments became increasingly common in the Third Century AD. Whether Timesitheus would have commanded the legion on active service in person or through a military deputy is not known.) Timesitheus was en poste as acting-governor in 222 AD and may have played a part in the overthrow of the equestrian usurper Marcus Opellius Macrinus in favour of Elagabalus. This service to the Severan dynasty might explain his continued rise under the regime of the "Syrian Princesses" who would certainly have been responsible for his appointment as Procurator in urbe Magister XX heredatium (collector of the one-twentieth - 5% - tax on inheritances in Rome), a post conferring ducenarius rank (salary 200.000ss/annum), and, at the same time, Logista Thymelae (Superintendent of the Imperial Theatre Properties). The office of Magister XX heredatium was an important financial post requiring expert administration. However, as holder of that office and that of logista Timesitheus also became a member of the court-circle. That may well have been the main object of the Syrian Princesses in securing him these appointments - to move a man who had proved his loyalty to them into a position where he would be able to exert influence on their behalf in areas well beyond the limits of the job-descriptions pertaining to his specific offices. As far as Timesitheus's career was concerned, his access to Imperial patronage as a palatinus, or courtier, would have effectively set him above less-favoured ducenarii officials in the competition for procuratorial postings; there followed two important appointments which were associated with the two major wars fought by Alexander Severus, first against the renascent Persian Empire (232 AD) (Note: The Persian Empire had been recently revived under the leadership of the Ardashir, the first "King of Kings" of the Sassanid dynasty.) and then against the league of German Peoples who were to become known to the Romans as the Alemanni (234-5 AD) (Note: The name 'Alamanni' may not yet have been applied by the Romans to the league of German peoples recently formed to the north of their South German territories, the Agri Decumates. However, as a serious threat to the Imperial hegemony in that region this group had been known to the Imperial government at least since the era of Caracalla - see above.) in which Timesitheus's assorted military and procuratorial competencies would, perhaps, have been particularly useful to the regime.

The first of these appointments was as Procurator provinciae Syriae Palaestinae ibi Exactor Reliquorum Annonae Sacrae Expeditionis (Procurator of Syria Palaestina with particular responsibility for collecting the balance of the taxes-in-kind (annonae) levied in support of the "Sacred War; (Note: The war against Persia was termed "Sacred" because the conflict was conducted, in name at least, by the Emperor himself, Alexander Severus. In fact, the men in charge would have been officers who answered to Alexander's mother, Julia Mammaea.) and then Procurator patrimoni provinciarum Belgica et duarum Germaniarum ibi vice praesidis provinciae Germaniae Inferioris (Administrator of the Imperial Patrimonial Domains, viz., the estates that belonged to the Imperial Office as opposed to the private estates of the Severan Dynasty) in Belgica and the two Germanies (Germania Inferior and Germania Superior). While holding that office he was also made vice praesidis (Acting Governor) of Germania Inferior - the lower Roman Rhineland - in which capacity he commanded the two legions stationed in that province during Alexander Severus's German war. (To make it possible for Timesitheus to be put in command of these legions while retaining his equestrian status was probably the main object of Julia Mammaea in securing him the procuratorial appointment: it provides yet further evidence of the trust she had in him. Whether or not he actually saw action in that abortive conflict with the Alemanni is unknown.) That Timesitheus remained an equestrian when he might well have been adlected to the senate and, thus, been eligible to be appointed as the praetorian legatus of Lower Germany instead of just a vicar - i.e., one who acted on behalf of (vice) such an officer - was probably his choice. It is likely that he had already set his sights on the Praetorian Prefecture which was the most powerful position available to a subject under the Roman polity in the Third Century AD. That object of his ambitions would have been denied him under the prevailing Roman Administrative Law had he become a senator.

=== Death of Alexander Severus ===
The mutiny of the army in Germany that resulted in the murder Alexander Severus and his dominating mother, Julia Avita Mamaea, and their replacement by Maximinus Thrax might have been expected to set back the career of a man who had been so closely associated with the Severan Dynasty and with Mamaea herself. However, not only did Timesitheus survive, but his career continued to prosper. Under the new regime he became Procurator provinciae Bithyniae Ponti Paphlagoniae tam patrimoni quam rationis privatae ibi vice procuratoris XXXX, item vice proco(n)sulis - i.e. fiscal administrator of the Asiatic Black Sea provinces of Bithynia, Pontus, and Paphlagonia with particular responsibility for managing the Imperial domains, both patrimonial and private. In addition, he was made acting procurator responsible for the collection of the custom duties levied at one-fortieth ad valorem. As in his previous posting in Germania he was also appointed acting proconsul - i.e., governor of these provinces - thus replacing a senatorial appointee (this time of consular status) for whom that office would normally have been reserved. Whatever reservations Maximinus Thrax may have entertained regarding Timesitheus's loyalties, his need for money to finance his German wars obviously did not allow him the luxury of foregoing the financial and administrative expertise the man could bring to his government of the Empire. (At the time - viz., before the assaults on this region mounted by barbarians from the lands to the north of the Black Sea and the Sea of Azov that were to characterise the middle years of the Third Century (Note: See inter alia Crisis of the Third Century.) - the provinces given over to Timesitheus's care were among the richest in the Roman world). However, it may be indicative of the emperor's reservations that, whereas in Germany Timesitheus had commanded two legions, he now had none, Asia consisting of provinciae inermes - i.e., provinces where there were no Imperial troops permanently in garrison. (Note: The inermes status of Timesitheus's provinces does not necessarily mean that there were no troops stationed there: there were undoubtedly detachments from other provinces with legionary garrisons sent to carry out escort/police duties, collect supplies etc.) (Note: Maximinus could have intended that any sense of slight Timesitheus might have felt at being deprived of a legionary command would be assuaged by the fact that as vice proco(n)sulis of Asia he would be sexa-fascalis - i.e., they would merit a ceremonial escort of six lictors - whereas as vice praeses of Germania Inferior he had enjoyed praetorian status only and was thus merely quinque-fascalis - only five lictors. However, even had the emperor cared in the slightest for Timesitheus's presumed feelings - which seems unlikely given what is known of his character - as already suggested, Timesitheus probably set little store by the dignified appurtenances of power as opposed to his ability efficiently to exercise its actuality.)

=== Fall of Maximinus Thrax ===
The mutiny of his army at Aquileia that brought an end to the regime of Maximinus Thrax also ended Timesitheus's term as the governor of Asia. However, he was soon employed again, this time as procurator provinciarum Lugdunensis et Aquitainicae - i.e. procurator of the two largest Gallic provinces: it would seem that he retained powerful friends in Rome despite his willingness to enter into accommodation with the military tyrant that the Senate had successfully faced down and that his administrative talents were too useful to be gainsaid. Admittedly, on this occasion he was not made an acting-governor; indeed, while procurator of Lugdunensis and Aquitainica he was, nominally at least, demoted to the rank of ducenarius. It could be that influential senators — who mistrusted equestrians who got above their social station and particularly resented brilliant high-fliers such as Timesitheus — may have intended this downgrade of his official ranking as a snub. As already intimated, however, Timesitheus is unlikely to have been either disturbed or impressed. (Note: It is possible that, even in the short term, the main effect of the demise of Maximinus Thrax's administration and the subsequent overthrow of the Senate's preferred candidates for the Empire, Pupienus and Balbinus, was to return to effective power those who had exercised it under Julia Mamaea. As suggested above, Timesitheus seems not to have lacked for influential friends at court or in the City.)

=== Return to Rome ===
Timesitheus seems to have used his position in the government of the Gauls to cultivate the leaders of Gallic society. The Lyons Inscription (already mentioned) refers to him as optimus patronus (i.e. Best of Patrons) which implies that when his term of office came to an end he returned to Rome as an ambassador representing the interests the Gallic provinces. This would have facilitated his renewed access to the Imperial Court. As already indicated, Timesitheus was much admired for his culture and learning - for which much could be forgiven in Roman Society - and his rhetorical prowess no doubt did much to restore his reputation and influence with senior courtiers and senators who were dominant in Imperial politics in the early years of the reign of Gordian III.

So complete was his return to favour that, not long after his return to the City, he succeeded in marrying his daughter, Furia Sabinia Tranquillina, to Gordian, and was afterwards appointed his Praetorian Prefect, probably the consummation of his life's ambition. It has been suggested that the appointment of her father as his first minister and senior general was the Emperor's wedding-present to his young bride: there is no reason to suppose that Timesitheus had to serve terms in any of the other great Equestrian Offices of the Imperial Service (i.e. the Watch, the Corn Supply and the Government of Egypt) often regarded as necessary precursors to the Praetorian Prefecture before this appointment was bestowed upon him.

=== Reputation as Praetorian Prefect ===
Timesitheus served as Praetorian Prefect for some three years from 241 until his death in 243. The only narrative source on his term of office is the Scriptores Historiae Augustae (SHA) and, as already noted, the author of the Vita Tres Gordiani could hardly have been more fulsome in singing his praises, both as the father-in-law of the young emperor and as the protector of the Empire. This generous assessment is supported by two citations of supposed correspondence between Timesitheus and Gordian (probably invented) and a number of topoi familiarly used in Latin historiography to define a worthy servant of the state - i.e. a crackdown on sale of offices by members of the palatini, (Note: In Timesitheus'case the prime offenders identified by SHA were members of the household of the Empress-Mother, Maecia Faustina. The usual caveats relating to this source apply) care for the defence of the frontiers and exemplary behaviour in his capacity as commander of the Praetorian Guard. The favourable view of Timesitheus's term of office entertained by the SHA is not challenged by modern scholars - although the inadequacy of the data is acknowledged.

=== Achievements in office ===
Much of the first two years of Timesitheus's prefecture seems to have been spent producing a stable environment in which government of any sort could be carried on. His main means to this end seems to have been strengthening the authority of the Praetorian Prefecture—his own office—and to move equestrians with a fiscal background, such as himself, into positions of power. (Note: Two such men were Marcus Julius Philippus (later known as Philip the Arab), and his brother Gaius Julius Priscus, who Timesitheus seems to have made his co-Praetorian Prefect. Like Timesitheus, these men had impressive backgrounds in fiscal administration, but his promotion of them was to have dire consequences for his regime and for the Empire; see below.) The main effect of his manoeuvering seems to have been to ensure that the kind of men who had carried on the government under Alexander Severus were restored to effective office.

The principal challenges to his conduct of affairs seem to have been posed by senators such as Sabinianus, the governor of Africa Proconsularis, whose revolt had to be put down by the equestrian governor of Mauretania, and Tullius Menophilus, the hero of the Siege of Aquileia. The latter was executed in 241 for reasons not properly understood and to have suffered the further penalty of damnatio memoriae - i.e., formal obliteration of his name from the historical record.

Details of Timesitheus' policies and achievements as the (probable) de facto ruler of the Empire during the reign of his son-in-law are sparse. There is evidence of substantial road repairs undertaken in many parts of the Roman World which would have been of economic and strategic significance. Monuments were restored in major cities which might have lifted civilian morale as well as providing employment for sculptors, stonemasons etc. It also seems that there was a thoroughgoing adjustment of the African frontier. It is not possible to tell how far such measures reflected policy guidelines issued by Timesitheus' office to provincial authorities, still less what detailed planning was carried out there. The most that can be said with any confidence is that he does not seem to have stood in the way of functionaries, such as the procurator of Mauretania, who conceived and drove forward such works.

=== Persia ===
His main concern as the Emperor's principal minister and adviser was in dealing with the threat to the oriental provinces posed by the renascent power of Persia under one of its most effective "Kings of Kings", Shapur I.

Shapur's ambitions when he succeeded his father Ardashir in 240 were no doubt inflated by his initial successes, but there also seems no doubt that he was determined to: (i) secure strategic control of the minor states of eastern Mesopotamia that controlled access to Roman Syria across the eastern desert frontier west of the River Euphrates; and (ii) replace Rome as the hegemonic power in the Kingdom of Armenia. During the reign of Maximinus, Rome had suffered the loss of considerable territories in Mesopotamia to Ardashir which the Roman Emperor had been unable to prevent or avenge because of his internal distractions: on his accession, Shapur renewed the onslaught, capturing more of the Mesopotamian fortresses and penetrating Syria itself, where Antioch, the capital of the Roman east, may have come under threat. More seriously, perhaps, the confidence of Rome's governing elite that the Empire was capable of seeing off the Persian threat to the Oriens was seriously undermined.

In the first two years of his prefecture, Timesitheus was not able to give his attention to the threat to Rome's territories in the east posed by Shapur, but in 242 he began to organise a response appropriate to the magnitude of the crisis. Under his supervision, a powerful army was put together consisting of vexillationes from the garrisons of the Rhine and Danube provinces. This expeditionary force seems to have been very well-equipped and financed. Neither did Timesitheus neglect the issue of morale. For the last time in recorded history, war was declared with traditional Roman formalities from the temple of Janus. More significantly, before he left Rome with the Emperor, Timesitheus addressed the concerns of the Greek east by holding games in honour of Pallas Athena in her capacity as Athena Promachos - Aθηνᾶ Πρόμαχος (Athena Who-Fights-In-The-Frontline) - the patron goddess of Athens credited with saving Greece from Persia at the time of the Battle of Marathon. The object of this latter exercise was probably to reaffirm the role of Rome under the Emperor Gordian as the heir of Athens in securing the Greek world from Persian domination.

The removal of so many seasoned troops from their Rhine and Danube stations encouraged an assault across the lower Danube by the Carpi and other northern barbarians. However, Timesitheus, en route to the east through the Balkans, inflicted a serious defeat on the invaders in Thracia. He seems then to have followed the usual practice of Roman commanders after victories over barbarian peoples of obliging the defeated to provide contingents of troops. Such measures were intended not only to reinforce his army, but also to remove those restless young men who might have been disposed to make more trouble in its absence. (Note: In Res Gestae Divi Saporis, the inscription on his victory-monument at Naqsh-e Rustam, the Persian King was later to claim that the Roman Army he defeated at the Battle of Misiche in 244 included German and Gothic auxiliaries.)

On arriving in the theatre of operations he seems to have mounted a highly successful campaign against the Persians in Mesopotamia, inflicting a crushing defeat on them at the Battle of Resaena (Ras-al Ayn, Syria). This enabled the Romans to recover all their main positions in Mesopotamia, including Carrhae, Nisbis and Singara and restore their colony at Edessa in Adiabene. (Note: It is considered good practice in academe to accept the SHA as a reliable source of information only when its assertions can be verified from other evidence. On this occasion its account of the success of Timesitheus's operations in Mesopotamia seems to be justified in the light of coins issued honouring Gordian and Tranquillina by the Mesopotamian cities of Edessa, Carrhae and Nisbis - see SHA Vita Gord, 26 fn 100.) The SHA suggests that it was Timesitheus' intention to follow up this success by advancing on the Persian western capital at Ctesiphon. His death meant that Shapur never had to face a powerful, well-equipped Roman army, led by a first-class general and not distracted by other enemies (as in the case of Valerian in 260) until he encountered Odenathus of Palmyra.

== The death of Timesitheus ==
Before the projected campaign to capture Ctesiphon could get underway, Timesitheus died in obscure circumstances. The SHA asserts that Timesitheus was suffering from an attack of diarrhea and that Marcus Julius Philippus (Philip the Arab) succeeded in having his medication doctored, thus fatally inflaming the symptoms of his illness. This account is not found in the Greek sources and is not now generally accepted in academe. His death most likely was caused by dysentery. However, Philip the Arab and his brother, Gaius Julius Priscus, Timesitheus's co-Praetorian Prefect, were the chief beneficiaries of Timesitheus's death.

Following the removal of Timesitheus's presiding genius, the organisation of the campaign - presumably now under Priscus, who succeeded him - fell into disarray. The Augustan History's assertion that Philip (who was promoted to the Praetorian Prefecture in tandem with his brother), deliberately contrived to starve the army of supplies in order to undermine the authority of Gordian may or may not be true, but the decision of the brothers to pursue the attack down the River Euphrates at the turn of 243/4, at the height of the Assyrian rainy season, seems to demonstrate a lack of strategic insight that invited disaster. Whatever its cause, the death of Timesitheus put in motion a series of events that deprived the Roman Empire of what was probably its best chance of quashing the pretensions of the Persian monarchy before it became fully established.

== Summation ==
Timesitheus's historical significance is that in the period when the provisions of Roman administrative law that formally reserved the government of key Imperial provinces for members of the Senatorial order were being increasingly set aside and specialists of equestrian rank brought to the fore, he was one of the foremost examples of the new type of functionary. In his day such officials tended to be particularly expert in fiscal administration, reflecting the Imperial government's urgent need for additional revenues to support the cost of the army reforms introduced by Septimius Severus and Caracalla. However, within a very short time, as the Crisis of the Third Century gathered momentum, the equestrian officers being appointed vice senatorial magistrates in regions at particular risk tended to be professional soldiers than those who had made their way in the procuratorial branches of the Imperial Service. It would appear that Timesitheus combined fiscal expertise of a high order with considerable military competence which probably assisted his advancement. However, it was almost certainly his fiscal capabilities - together with the powerful court-connections that were essential to success at the highest level of the Imperial Service - that supplied the chief underpinning of his career.

He had the reputation in antiquity of being highly cultured, fluent in both Latin and Greek, an exemplar of the virtue of παιδεία (paideia) (in Latin, humanitas), the essential quality of a fully developed human being. (The SHA notes as mark of virtus that he corresponded with his son-in-law in Greek.) This, combined with administrative and military competencies of a high order, rendered Timesitheus the perfect Imperial functionary in the eyes of his contemporaries. These attributes enabled him to survive the violent removal of three emperors and continue to flourish as an indispensable, if not always wholly trusted, servant of the state.

His career bears witness to his rare appreciation of where real power lay in the Roman polity and also of the opportunities that prevailing circumstances were opening up for men of equestrian origins such as himself to share in that power. However, it also suggests that he realized the likely limitations that the social compact still imposed on men originating from outside the charmed circle of the Senatorial order. It would seem that, having made this analysis, he pursued the exercise of real power with a single-minded diligence as an equestrian. Within the constraints of the Imperial System of government, he seems to have been a highly effective statesman and administrator. It is possible that his premature death (however that came about) deprived Rome of the services of a statesman and a general who might have saved the Empire from the humiliations that were to be inflicted on it by Shapur I.

== Family tree ==
previous Maximinus Thrax; Roman Emperor; 235–238 | Pupienus; Roman Emperor; 238 | Gordian I Roman Emperor; 238 ∞ (?) Fabia Orestilla
Balbinus; Roman Emperor; 238 | Gordian II co-emperor 238 | Maecia Faustina | (doubted); Junius Licinius Balbus consul suffectus | Gaius Furius Sabinius Aquila Timesitheus praetorian prefect | next Philip the Arab; Roman Emperor; 244–249
Gordian III; Roman Emperor; 238 | Furia Sabinia Tranquillina | Philip II; Roman Emperor co-emperor 247–249

== Nerva–Antonine family tree ==
Nerva–Antonine family tree

Q. Marcius Barea Soranus | Q. Marcius Barea Sura | Antonia Furnilla | M. Cocceius Nerva | Sergia Plautilla | P. Aelius Hadrianus
Titus (r. 79–81) | Marcia Furnilla | Marcia | Trajanus Pater | Nerva (r. 96–98) | Ulpia (Note: Sister of Trajan's father: Giacosa (1977), p. 7.) | Aelius Hadrianus Marullinus
Flavia (Note: Giacosa (1977), p. 8.) | Marciana (Note: Levick (2014), p. 161.) | C. Salonius Matidius (Note: Husband of Ulpia Marciana: Levick (2014), p. 161.) | Trajan (r. 98–117) | Plotina | P. Acilius Attianus | P. Aelius Afer (Note: Giacosa (1977), p. 7.) | Paulina Major (Note: DIR contributor (Herbert W. Benario, 2000), "Hadrian".)
Lucius Mindius (2) | Libo Rupilius Frugi (3) | Salonia Matidia (Note: Giacosa (1977), p. 9.) | L. Vibius Sabinus (1) (Note: Husband of Salonia Matidia: Levick (2014), p. 161.)
Paulina Minor | L. Julius Ursus Servianus (Note: Smith (1870), "Julius Servianus".)
Matidia Minor | Sabina | Hadrian (Note: Smith (1870), "Hadrian", pp. 319–322.) (r. 117–138) | Antinous (Note: Lover of Hadrian: Lambert (1984), p. 99 and passim; deification: Lamber (1984), pp. 2–5, etc.)
C. Fuscus Salinator I | Julia Serviana Paulina
M. Annius Verus (Note: Husband of Rupilia Faustina: Levick (2014), p. 163.) | Rupilia Faustina (Note: Levick (2014), p. 163.) (Note: It is uncertain whether Rupilia Faustina was Frugi's daughter by Salonia Matidia or another woman.) | Boionia Procilla | Cn. Arrius Antoninus
L. Ceionius Commodus | Appia Severa | C. Fuscus Salinator II
L. Caesennius Paetus | Arria Antonina | Arria Fadilla (Note: Levick (2014), p. 162.) | T. Aurelius Fulvus
L. Caesennius Antoninus | L. Commodus | Plautia | unknown (Note: Levick (2014), p. 164.) | C. Avidius Nigrinus
M. Annius Verus | Calvisia Domitia Lucilla (Note: Wife of M. Annius Verus: Giacosa (1977), p. 10.) | Fundania (Note: Wife of M. Annius Libo: Levick (2014), p. 163.) | M. Annius Libo | Faustina | Antoninus Pius (r. 138–161) | L. Aelius Caesar | Avidia
Cornificia | Marcus Aurelius (r. 161–180) (Note: Giacosa (1977), p. 10.) | Faustina Minor | C. Avidius Cassius (Note: The epitomator of Cassius Dio (72.22) gives the story that Faustina the Elder promised to marry Avidius Cassius. This is also echoed in HA "Marcus Aurelius" 24.) | Aurelia Fadilla | Lucius Verus (r. 161–169) (1) | Ceionia Fabia | Plautius Quintillus (Note: Husband of Ceionia Fabia: Levick (2014), p. 164.) | Q. Servilius Pudens | Ceionia Plautia
Cornificia Minor (Note: Levick (2014), p. 117.) | M. Petronius Sura | Commodus (r. 177–192) | Fadilla | M. Annius Verus Caesar | Ti. Claudius Pompeianus (2) | Lucilla | M. Plautius Quintillus | Junius Licinius Balbus | Servilia Ceionia
Petronius Antoninus | L. Aurelius Agaclytus (2) | Aurelia Sabina | L. Antistius Burrus (1) | Plautius Quintillus | Plautia Servilla | C. Furius Sabinus Timesitheus | Maecia Faustina | Junius Licinius Balbus?
Furia Sabinia Tranquillina | Gordian III (r. 238–244)

- (1) = 1st spouse
- (2) = 2nd spouse
- (3) = 3rd spouse
- Reddish-purple indicates emperor of the Nerva–Antonine dynasty
  lighter purple indicates designated imperial heir of said dynasty who never reigned
  grey indicates unsuccessful imperial aspirants
  bluish-purple indicates emperors of other dynasties
- dashed lines indicate adoption; dotted lines indicate love affairs/unmarried relationships
- Small Caps = posthumously deified (Augusti, Augustae, or other)

Notes:

Except where otherwise noted, the notes below indicate that an individual's parentage is as shown in the above family tree.

References:
- DIR contributors (2000). "De Imperatoribus Romanis: An Online Encyclopedia of Roman Rulers and Their Families".
- Giacosa, Giorgio (1977). Women of the Caesars: Their Lives and Portraits on Coins. Translated by R. Ross Holloway. Milan: Edizioni Arte e Moneta. ISBN 0-8390-0193-2.
- Lambert, Royston (1984). Beloved and God: The Story of Hadrian and Antinous. New York: Viking. ISBN 0-670-15708-2.
- Levick, Barbara (2014). Faustina I and II: Imperial Women of the Golden Age. Oxford University Press. ISBN 978-0-19-537941-9.
- Smith, William, ed. (1870). Dictionary of Greek and Roman Biography and Mythology.
