= Battle of Resaena =

Battle between Roman and Sasanian forces (243)

Coordinates: 36°51′1.08″N 40°4′14.16″E

- Part of Shapur I's first Roman campaign
Date	243
Location	Resaena, Mesopotamia (Ras al-Ayn, Syria)
Result	Roman victory

Belligerents
Roman Empire	Sasanian Empire

Commanders and leaders
Gordian III; Timesitheus	Shapur I

The Battle of Resaena or Resaina, near present-day Ceylanpınar, Turkey, was fought in 243 between the forces of the Roman Empire, led by the Emperor Gordian III and the Praetorian Prefect Timesitheus against the Sasanian Empire's forces during the reign of Shapur I. The Romans were victorious.

== Background ==
The battle was fought during a campaign ordered by Emperor Gordian III to reoccupy the cities of Hatra, Nisibis, and Carrhae. These territories had been conquered by Shapur and his father, Ardashir I, when the Roman Empire plunged into the Crisis of the Third Century, a conflict among several pretenders to the imperial throne.

== Aftermath ==
Following this victory, the Roman legions recovered Nisibis and Singara, and advanced by way of the Khabur to the Euphrates, intending to take Ctesiphon. However, Gordian's army was defeated at the battle of Misiche in 244 and the Roman Emperor was either killed during the battle or assassinated afterwards.
