= Battle of Misiche =

Battle between the Sasanians and the Romans (244)

- Part of Shapur I's first Roman campaign
- Peroz-Shapur (Misiche) on the border of Asorestan (Mesopotamia)
Date	Winter/early Spring of 244 AD
Location	Misiche (later Peroz Shapur), Mesopotamia (modern Iraq) 33°21′50″N 43°47′50″E
Result	Sasanian victory (Note: Shapur I had to expect a military reaction from the Romans. For them, the loss of these cities warranted a counteroffensive, and Emperor Gordian III led an army against Shapur I, regaining both Nisibis and Carrhae. However, he suffered a major defeat in a battle at Misiche, north of Ctesiphon, in 243.)
Territorial changes	Philip the Arab paid 500,000 denarii to the Sasanian Empire and cedes Armenia and Mesopotamia to them

Belligerents
Sasanian Empire	Roman Empire; Goths; Germans

Commanders and leaders
Shapur I	Emperor Gordian III †; Philip the Arab; Gaius Julius Priscus
- Location within Iraq

The Battle of Misiche (Greek: Μισιχή), Mesiche, or Massice (Middle Persian: 𐭬𐭱𐭩𐭪 mšyk; Parthian: 𐭌𐭔𐭉𐭊 mšyk) (dated between January 13 and March 14, 244 AD) was fought between the Sasanians and the Romans in Misiche, Mesopotamia.

== Background ==
The initial war began when the Roman Emperor Gordian III invaded the Sasanian Empire in 243 AD. His troops defeated the Sasanian forces at the Battle of Resaena and advanced as far as Misiche. The location of that city (or maybe a district) is conjectural, but is placed at modern Anbar.

== Battle ==
=== Inscription at Naqsh-e Rustam ===
The Battle is mentioned on the trilingual inscription king Shapur I made at Naqsh-e Rustam:

When at first we had become established in the empire, Gordian Caesar assembled from all of the Roman, Goth and German lands a military force and marched on Asorestan (Mesopotamia) against Ērānšahr (Sasanian Empire) and against us. On the border of Asorestan at Misiche, a great frontal battle occurred. Gordian Caesar was killed and the Roman force was destroyed. And the Romans made Philip Caesar. Then Philip Caesar came to us for terms, and to ransom their lives, gave us 500,000 denars, and became tributary to us. And for this reason we have renamed Misiche Peroz-Shapur [literally "Victorious Shapur"].

The Roman sources never admitted the defeat. The contemporary and later Roman sources claim that the Roman expedition was entirely or partially successful, but the emperor was murdered after a plot by Philip the Arab. However, some recent sources speculate that the Sasanian victory must not be invented and reject Philip's plot as the ultimate reason of Gordian's death. While some sources claim that it isn't likely that Gordian died during the battle, as Shapur's inscription claims, others state he died on the battlefield. The confusion of the sources about the expedition and the death of the emperor makes it possible that, after the defeat, Roman army was frustrated enough to get rid of the teenage emperor. The third tradition, reported in 6th century by John Malalas and three more eastern historians in 9th to 12th century, specifies that Gordianus crushed his thigh falling off his horse in battle and died of his injury, Malalas further specifying that he died on the way back. Roman sources claim that the soldiers proclaimed Philip emperor, that he made peace with Shapur on "shameful" terms, and that Gordian died as the Roman forces departed for the west. Zonaras says that Gordian died after falling from his horse during a battle. Scholarly analyses suggest the Sasanian version, "while defective[,] is superior" to the Roman one, which provides no explanation for why the victorious Roman army had to make peace on disadvantageous terms. some other source states that Gordian III died under uncertain circumstances.

The two historians, Ilkka Syvänne, and Katarzyna Maksymiuk have stated in their book:

Gordian appears to have only fallen off from his horse during the battle as a result of which his thigh was broken, but it is also possible that this was just one of the versions later spread by Philip to cover up his role in the murder of Gordian. Strictly speaking, Gordian was therefore not killed in action as claimed by the Persians. The Roman sources make it quite clear that Gordian died later at Zaitha between January and mid-March either as a result of his broken hip or at the hands of the supporters of Philip – in other words, he did not die at Misiche

— Syvanne & Maksymiuk 2018, The military history of the Third Century Iran, p. 81

== Aftermath ==
Gordian's successor, Philip the Arab, was proclaimed emperor of Rome and made peace with Shapur. The next major clash between the two empires took place in 252, when Shapur defeated a large Roman force at the Battle of Barbalissos and successfully invaded Syria and part of Anatolia.

After, Phillip signed a treaty between him and Shapur I, giving away Armenia and Mesopotamia. He later broke the treaty and seized both of Mesopotamia and Armenia back under the Roman domain.
