= Bessarion (disambiguation) =

Bessarion was a Byzantine Greek scholar who became a Roman Catholic cardinal and Latin Patriarch of Constantinople.

Bessarion can also refer to:

- Bessarion of Egypt, (4th century – 5th century), Egyptian Christian monk
- Bessarion II of Larissa (1489/90–1540), Bishop of Larissa
- Bessarion station, the Toronto Transit Commission subway station
- Bessarion (crater), a lunar crater
- Bessarion (designer), Georgian fashion designer
