= Titus Clodius Pupienus Pulcher Maximus =

3rd century Roman politician and consul

Titus Clodius Pupienus Pulcher Maximus (c. 195 – aft. 224/226 or aft. 235 AD) was a Roman politician.

== Life ==
He was appointed consul suffectus in the nundinium of 224 or 226, or perhaps of July 235. Titius Clodius was the son of Pupienus, later Emperor, and wife Sextia Cethegilla.

He married Tineia, the daughter of Quintus Tineius Sacerdos and Volusia Laodice. Together they had a son:

- Lucius Clodius Tineius Pupienus Bassus – who assumed the Toga virilis at Rome early in the third century and was made proconsul of Crete and Cyrenaica in 240 A.D. He married Ovinia Paterna, daughter of Lucius Ovinius Pacatianus and Cornelia Optata Aquilia Flavia, and had a son:
  - Marcus Tineius Ovinius Castus Pulcher – consul suffectus and pontiff before 274 AD. He had a son by an unknown mother:
    - Ovinius Tineius Tarrutenius Nonius Atticus (fl. 290 AD) – praetor and quindecimvir sacris faciundis. He married a woman named Maxima.

== Family tree ==
Quintus Tineius Sacerdos Clemens consul ordinarius	Marcus Pupienus Maximus
Quintus Tineius Clemens consul ordinarius	Quintius Tineius Rufus consul 182	Quintus Tineius Sacerdos consul suffectus ∞ Volusia Laodice	Pupienus; Roman Emperor (238) ∞ Sextia Cethegilla	Marcus Ulpius Leurus senator
Tineia	Titus Clodius Pupienus Pulcher Maximus consul suffectus	Marcus Pupienus Africanus Maximus consul ordinarius ∞ Cornelia Marullina	Pupiena Sextia Paulina Cethegilla	Marcus Ulpius Eubiotus Leurus suffect consul
Lucius Clodius Tineius Pupienus Bassus proconsul ∞ Ovinia Paterna
Marcus Tineius Ovinius Castus Pulcher consul suffectus, pontiff
Ovinius Tineius Tarrutenius Nonius Atticus

== Sources ==
- Christian Settipani. Continuité gentilice et continuité sénatoriale dans les familles sénatoriales romaines à l'époque impériale, 2000
