= Neophytus II of Larissa =

Neophytus II (Greek: Νεόφυτος Β΄) was bishop of Stagoi and then metropolitan bishop of Larissa in 1550–68.

He was a nephew of Bessarion II, Metropolitan of Larissa in 1526/7–40. His parents were wealthy, but became monks, and he followed in their footsteps, rising to become Bishop of Stagoi. He served there until June 1550, when he became Metropolitan of Larissa after the resignation of his predecessor (and successor of Bessarion), who was also named Neophytus; this led earlier scholars to confuse the two men and regard them as the same person.

Neophytus served as Metropolitan of Larissa (although based in Trikala) until 1569, and his tenure was regarded as equally successful to that of his uncle, who was known for his charitable work. Neophytus also built a new—and still surviving—katholikon for the Dousikou Monastery, originally built by his uncle, becoming thus its second ktetor. He was also responsible for the construction of cells for its monks and for the decoration of the katholikon with frescoes in 1557.
