= Byzantine Museum =

Byzantine Museum may refer to:

- Byzantine and Christian Museum, Athens, Greece
- Museum of Byzantine Culture, Thessaloniki, Greece
- Byzantine Museum of Antivouniotissa, Corfu, Greece
- Byzantine Museum of Ioannina, Ioannina, Greece
- Byzantine Museum of Kastoria, Kastoria, Greece
- Byzantine Museum of Phthiotis, Ypati, Greece
- Byzantine Museum of Veroia, Veroia, Greece
- Chios Byzantine Museum, Chios, Greece
