= Portaikos Bridge =

Portaikos Bridge Γεφύρι της Πύλης
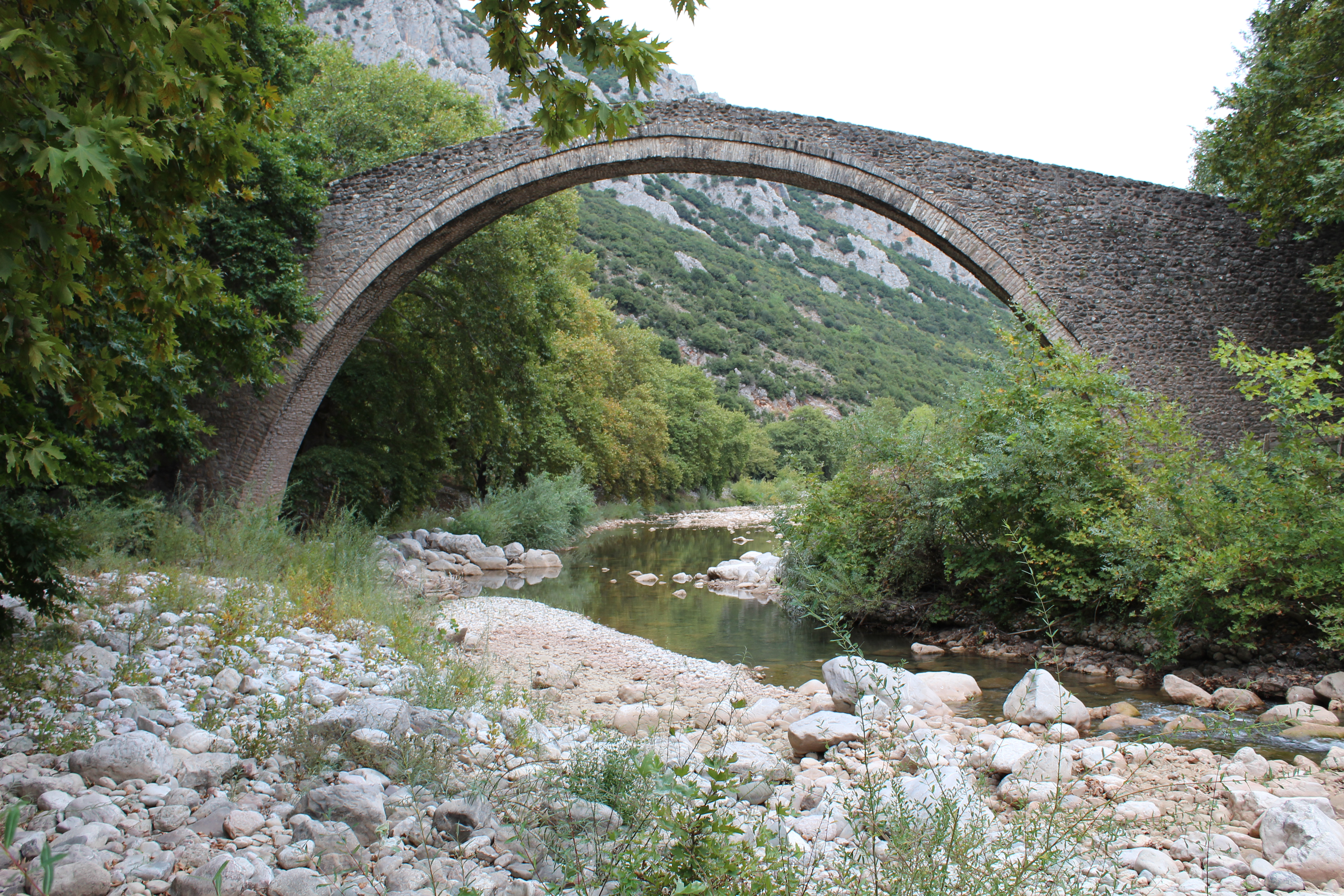
- Arch bridge crossing Portaikos river
- Coordinates: 39°27′38″N 21°26′2″E
- Carries: Pedestrian (footbridge)
- Locale: Trikala Prefecture, Greece

Characteristics
- Material: Stone
- Total length: 65 metres (213 ft)
- Width: 2.1 metres (6.9 ft)
- Longest span: 29 metres (95 ft)

History
- Construction end: 1514; 512 years ago

Location
- Interactive map of Portaikos Bridge

The Portaikos Bridge (Greek: Γέφυρα Πορταϊκού) is an Ottoman-era stone bridge over the Portaikos in the Trikala Prefecture, Thessaly, Greece.

The bridge is located on the 22nd kilometer of the Trikala–Arta national road, near the village of Pyli. It was built in 1514 by the Metropolitan of Larissa, Saint Bessarion, and until 1936 it was the only way connecting the Thessalian plain with the settlements of the Pindus mountain chain, through the nearby Porta pass. It remains the second largest pre-20th-century bridge in Thessaly to this day.

The bridge consists of a single semi-circular arch with a span of 29 meters and features a deck 2.1 meters wide. The bridge is built of rubble masonry except for the ledge, which is built of hewn sandstone. The bridge retains its original form except for maintenance work over the years, which has included the reconstruction of the parapet.
