= Pupienus =

Roman emperor in 238

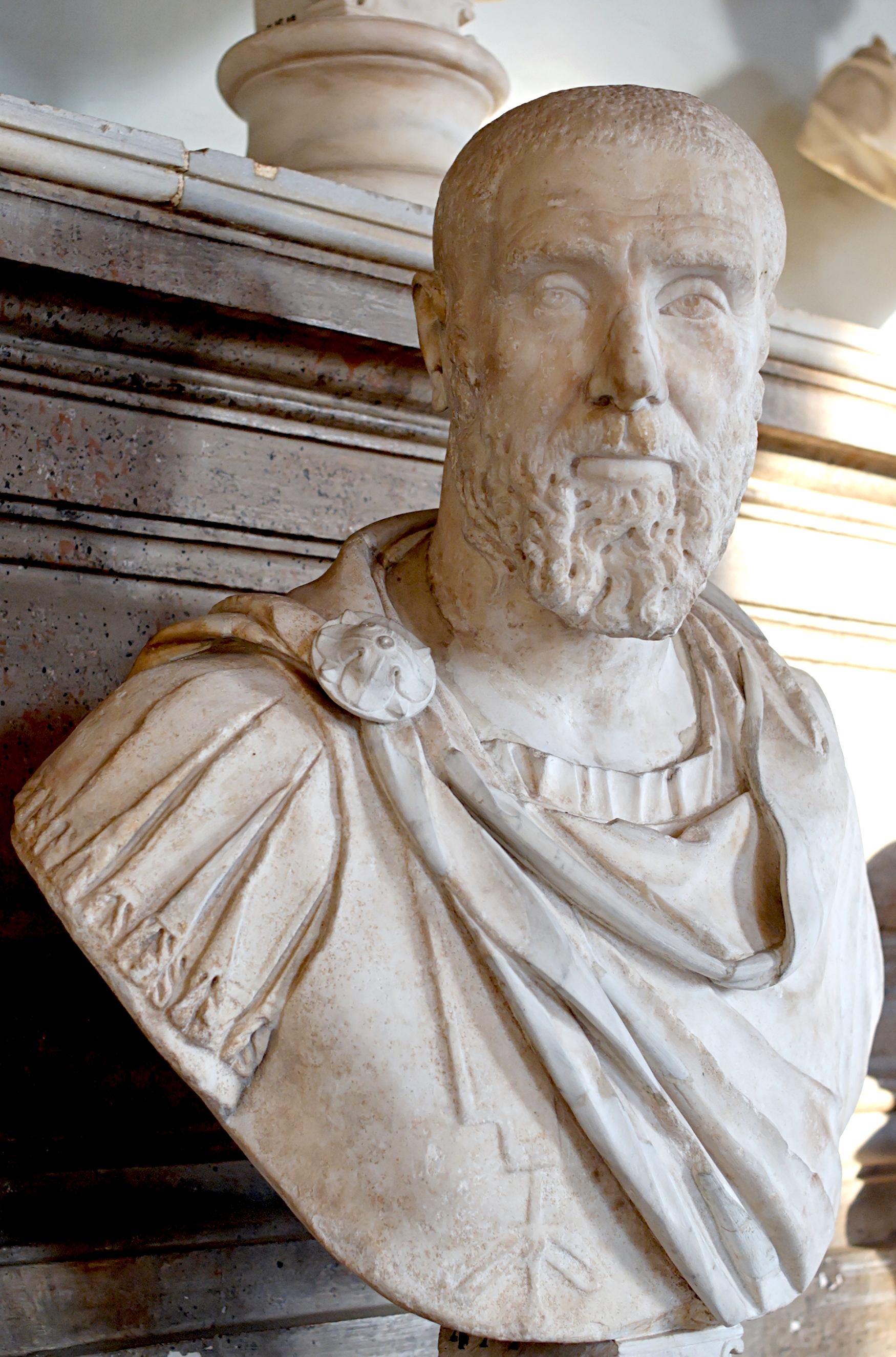
- Bust, Capitoline Museums

Roman emperor
- Reign: April/May – July/August 238
- Predecessor: Gordian I and II
- Successor: Gordian III
- Co-emperor: Balbinus
- Rival: Maximinus (until June)
- Born: c. 164
- Died: July/August 238 (aged approx. 74); Rome, Italy
- Issue Detail: Titus Clodius Pupienus Pulcher Maximus; Marcus Pupienus Africanus Maximus; Pupiena Sextia Paulina Cethegilla
Names
- Marcus Clodius Pupienus Maximus
Regnal name
- Imperator Caesar Marcus Clodius Pupienus Maximus Augustus
- Father: ? Marcus Pupienus Maximus
- Mother: ? Clodia Pulchra

Pupienus (Latin: Marcus Clodius Pupienus Maximus; c. 164 – July/August 238) was Roman emperor with Balbinus for 99 days in 238, during the Year of the Six Emperors. The sources for this period are scant, and thus knowledge of the emperor is limited. In most contemporary texts he is referred to by his cognomen "Maximus" rather than by his second nomen (family name) Pupienus (Classical Latin: [pupiˈenʊs]).

== Origins and early career ==
The Historia Augusta, whose testimony is not to be trusted unreservedly, paints Pupienus as an example of advancement through the cursus honorum due to military success. It claims he was the son of a blacksmith, was adopted by one Pescennia Marcellina (otherwise unknown), and who started his career as a Centurio primus pilus before becoming a tribunus militum, and then a praetor. Pupienus's career was allegedly impressive, serving a number of important posts during the reign of the Severan dynasty throughout the late 2nd and early 3rd centuries. This included assignment as Proconsul of the senatorial propraetorial provinces of Bithynia et Pontus, Achaea, and Gallia Narbonensis.

In fact Pupienus was part of the aristocracy, albeit a minor member, and his family had possibly been elevated only recently. Hailing from the Etruscan city of Volterra, it has been speculated that Pupienus was the son of Marcus Pupienus Maximus, a senator who was the first member of his family to enter the Senate, and wife Clodia Pulchra.

The claim in the Historia Augusta that Pupienus held three praetorian proconsular governorships is unlikely. For one thing, as Bernard Rémy points out, during Pupienus' lifetime the province of Bithynia et Pontus was an imperial one, governed by an imperial legatus. Remy points out another problem: that being awarded three praetorian proconsular governorships violates what is known of Roman practice, and lacks any similar cases. Remy pointedly quotes the opinion of André Chastagnol, who recommended "to admit an information provided by the Augustan History only if it is confirmed by another document" and considers that, faced with such an unreliable source, one must permit "methodical doubt and hypercritical attitude to prevail."

After his consulship (around the year 222), his cursus honorum is much more reliable. Pupienus was later assigned as imperial legate to one of the German provinces, most probably after his first suffect consulship, circa 207 AD. While governor he scored military victories over the Sarmatians and German tribes. At some point after he concluded his duties in the German province, the sortition awarded him proconsular governorship of Asia.

In 234, during the last years of Severus Alexander's reign, he was installed as consul for the second time. In that same year he was also appointed Urban Prefect of Rome and gained a reputation for severity, to the extent that he became unpopular with the Roman mob.

== Reign ==
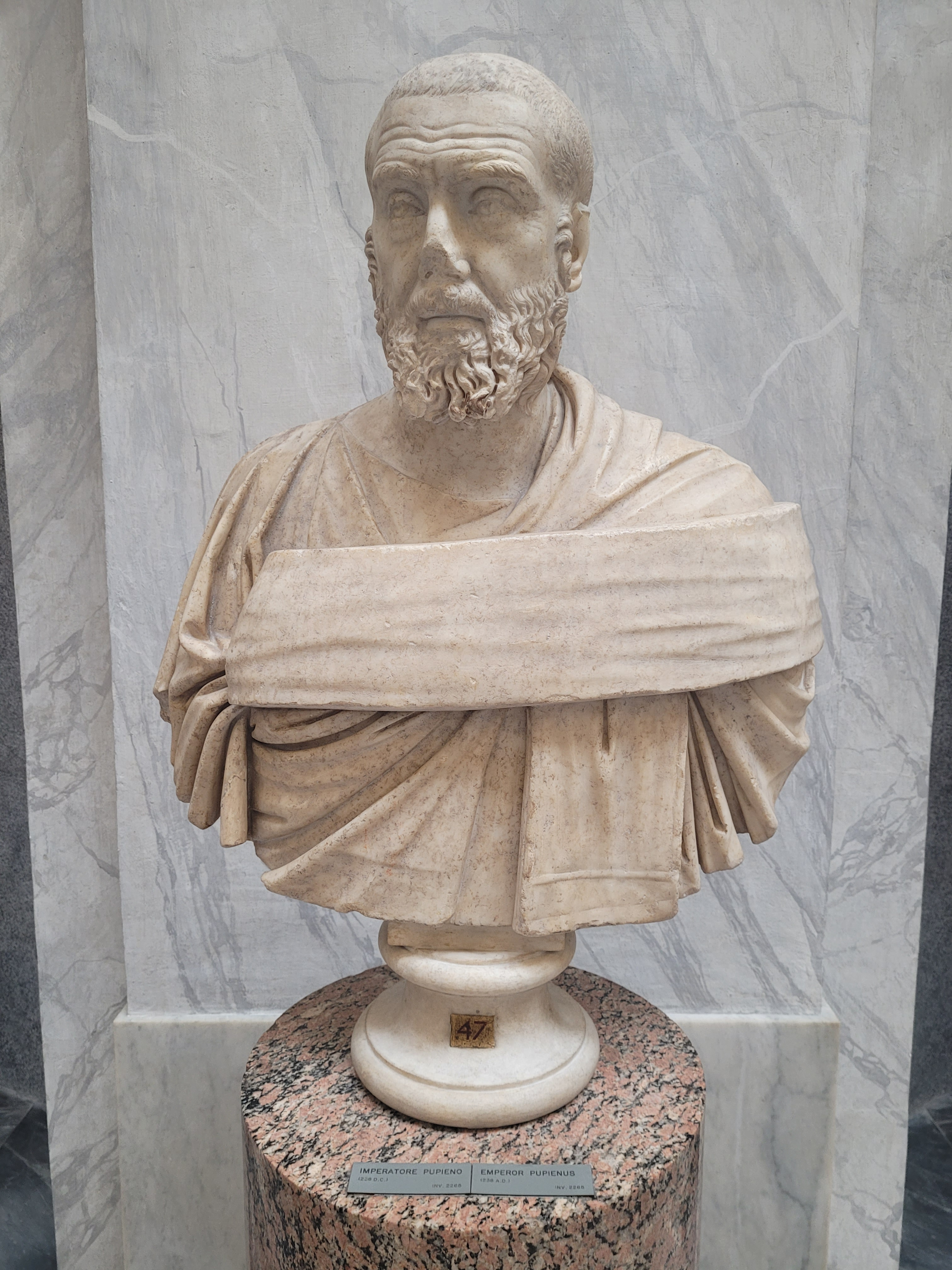
Bust of Pupienus at the Vatican Museums

When Gordian I and his son were proclaimed emperors in Africa, the Senate appointed a committee of twenty men, including the elderly senator Pupienus, to co-ordinate operations against Maximinus Thrax until the arrival of the Gordians. On the news of the Gordians' defeat and deaths, however, the Senate met in closed session in the Temple of Jupiter Capitolinus and voted for two members of the committee to be installed as co-emperors: Pupienus and Balbinus. Unlike the situation in 161, both emperors were elected as pontifices maximi, chief priests of the official cults.

According to Edward Gibbon (drawing on the narratives of Herodian and the Historia Augusta), the choice was sensible, as:

the mind of Maximus [Pupienus] was formed in a rougher mould [than that of Balbinus]. By his valour and abilities he had raised himself from the meanest origin to the first employments of the state and army. His victories over the Sarmatians and the Germans, the austerity of his life, and the rigid impartiality of his justice whilst he was prefect of the city, commanded the esteem of a people whose affections were engaged in favour of the more amiable Balbinus. The two colleagues had both been consul... and, since the one was sixty and the other seventy-four years old, they had both attained the full maturity of age and experience.

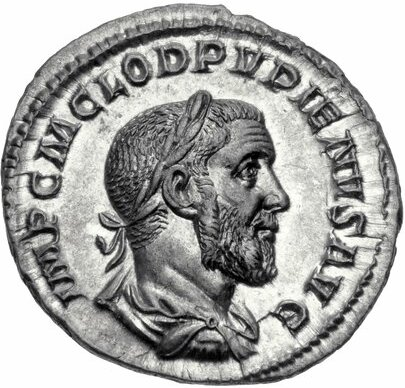
Denarius of Pupienus. Inscription: "IMP C M CLOD PUPIENUS AUG"

However, factions within the Senate who had hoped to profit from the accession of the Gordians manipulated the people and the Praetorian Guard to agitate for the elevation of Gordian III as their imperial colleague. Leaving his senior colleague Balbinus in charge of the civil administration at Rome, sometime during late April, Pupienus marched to Ravenna, where he oversaw the campaign against Maximinus, recruiting German auxiliary troops who had served under him whilst he was in Germania. After Maximinus was assassinated by his soldiers just outside Aquileia, Pupienus dispatched both Maximinus' troops and his own back to their provinces (along with a considerable donative) and returned to Rome with his newly acquired German bodyguard.

Balbinus, in the meantime, had failed to keep public order in the capital. The sources suggest that Balbinus suspected Pupienus of using his German bodyguard to supplant him, and they were soon living in different parts of the Imperial palace. This meant that they were at the mercy of disaffected elements in the Praetorian Guard, who resented serving under Senate-appointed emperors, and now plotted to kill them. Pupienus, becoming aware of the threat, begged Balbinus to call for the German bodyguard. Balbinus, believing that this news was part of a plot by Pupienus to have him assassinated, refused, and the two began to argue just as the Praetorians burst into the room. Both emperors were seized and dragged back to the Praetorian barracks where they were tortured and hacked to death in the bath house. They only ruled 99 days.

== Family and other Emperors of the era ==
Three individuals have been identified as his children. Titus Clodius Pupienus Pulcher Maximus, consul suffectus c. 235, and patron of the town of Tibur outside Rome, has been identified as his oldest son. Marcus Pupienus Africanus Maximus, consul ordinarius in 236 as the colleague of the Emperor Maximinus Thrax, has been identified as his youngest son. These consulships in the family, across the reigns of Severus Alexander and Maximinus Thrax, suggest that the family was influential and in high regard. Pupienus also had a daughter named Pupiena Sextia Paulina Cethegilla, who possibly married Marcus Ulpius Eubiotus Leurus.

Quintus Tineius Sacerdos Clemens consul ordinarius	Marcus Pupienus Maximus
Quintus Tineius Clemens consul ordinarius	Quintius Tineius Rufus consul 182	Quintus Tineius Sacerdos consul suffectus ∞ Volusia Laodice	Pupienus; Roman Emperor (238) ∞ Pulchra(?)	Marcus Ulpius Leurus senator
Maximinus Thrax; Roman Emperor; 235–238 ∞ Caecilia Paulina	Gordian I Roman Emperor; 238	Tineia	Titus Clodius Pupienus Pulcher Maximus consul suffectus	Marcus Pupienus Africanus Maximus consul ordinarius ∞ Cornelia Marullina	Pupiena Sextia Paulina Cethegilla	Marcus Ulpius Eubiotus Leurus suffect consul
Gaius Julius Verus Maximus caesar	Gordian II; Roman emperor 238	Maecia Faustina	Lucius Clodius Tineius Pupienus Bassus proconsul ∞ Ovinia Paterna	Balbinus; Roman emperor 238
Gordian III; Roman Emperor; 238–244

== Sources ==
- Meckler, David Stone (2001). "Pupienus (238 A.D.) and Balbinus (238 A.D.)". De Imperatoribus Romanis. Archived from the original on 11 March 2022.
- Potter, David S. (2004). The Roman Empire at Bay, AD 180–395. Routledge. ISBN 0-415-10058-5..
- Southern, Pat (2001). The Roman Empire from Severus to Constantine. London New York: Routledge. ISBN 978-0415239431. OCLC 46421874.

Regnal titles
Preceded by Gordian I, Gordian II, Maximinus Thrax	Roman emperor 238; With: Balbinus	Succeeded by Gordian III
Political offices
Preceded by L. Valerius Maximus; Gnaeus Cornelius Paternus	Roman consul 234 with Marcus Munatius Sulla Urbanus	Succeeded by Gnaeus Claudius Severus; Lucius Titus Claudius Quintianus
