= Quintus Tineius Rufus =

Quintus Tineius Rufus may refer to:

- Quintus Tineius Rufus (consul 127)
- Quintus Tineius Rufus (consul 182)
