= Marmaritzana =

Marmaritzana (Greek: Μαρμαριτζάνα) was a medieval Byzantine city and bishopric in Central Greece.

The exact site of the city is unknown, except that it lay in the upper valley of the Spercheios River, west of Neopatras (modern Ypati). The city is mostly unknown except for the fact that it was an episcopal see attested at least since the time of Byzantine emperor Leo VI the Wise (r. 886–912) until the 13th century. It was the only suffragan of the metropolitan see of Neopatras. It may be identical with the see of Marmaritzion, mentioned in a single Notitia Episcopatuum of the 11th century as a suffragan of the Metropolis of Larissa.

Following the Fourth Crusade, the episcopal lists of the Roman Catholic Church included it as Valacensis or Lavacensis, but the see probably remained vacant, whether by Greek Orthodox or by Latin Catholic bishops, from the early 13th century on. The see remains a titular bishopric of the Catholic Church since its nominal restoration in 1933, as "Marmarizana". It is long vacant, having had a single incumbent of the lowest (episcopal) rank: Thomas O’Beirne (1739.08.26 – 1739.09.16), later Coadjutor Bishop of Ardagh (Ireland) (1739.08.26 – 1739.09.16), succeeding as Bishop of Ardagh (1739.09.16 – 1747.01).

== Sources ==
- Koder, Johannes; Hild, Friedrich (1976). Tabula Imperii Byzantini, Band 1: Hellas und Thessalia (in German). Vienna: Verlag der Österreichischen Akademie der Wissenschaften. ISBN 3-7001-0182-1.
- GCatholic, with titular incumbent bio links
