= Ypati =

Village in Phthiotis, Greece

Ypati Υπάτη
- Municipal unit
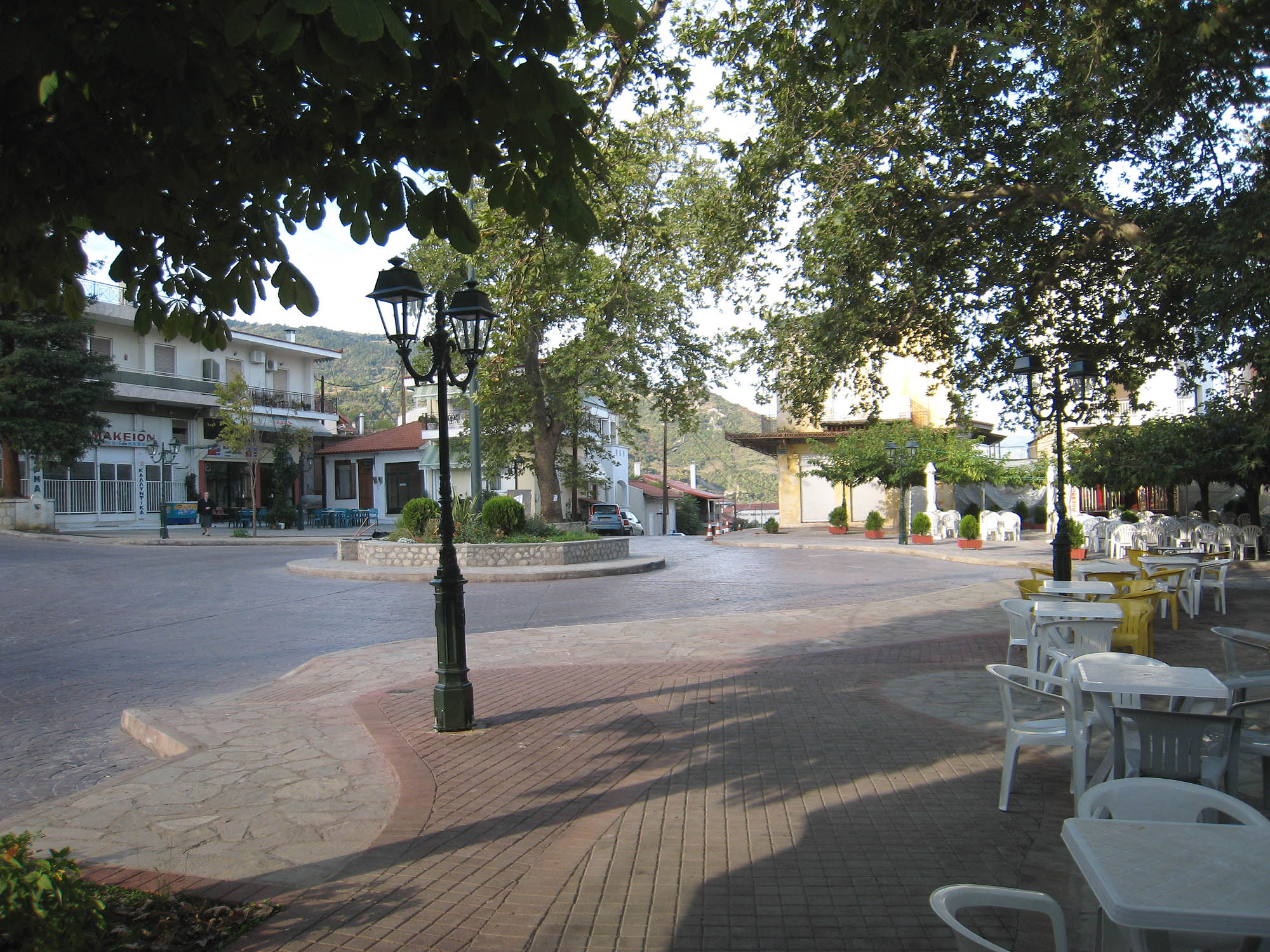

- Location within the regional unit

- Location within Greece
- Coordinates: 38°52′N 22°14′E
- Country: Greece
- Administrative region: Central Greece
- Regional unit: Phthiotis
- Municipality: Lamia

Area
  - Municipal unit: 257.5 km^{2} (99.4 sq mi)

Population (2021)
  - Municipal unit: 3,537
  - Municipal unit density: 13.74/km^{2} (35.58/sq mi)
  - Community: 440
- Time zone: UTC+2 (EET)
  - Summer (DST): UTC+3 (EEST)
- Vehicle registration: ΜΙ

Ypati (Greek: Υπάτη) is a village and a former municipality in Phthiotis, central peninsular Greece. Since the 2011 local government reform it is part of the municipality of Lamia, of which it is a municipal unit. The municipal unit has an area of 257.504 km^{2}. In 2021 its population was 3,537 for the municipal unit, and 440 for the settlement of Ypati itself. The town has a long history, being founded at the turn of the 5th/4th century BC as the capital of the Aenianes. During the Roman period the town prospered and was regarded as the chief city of Thessaly, as well as a bishopric. It was probably abandoned in the 7th century as a result of the Slavic invasions, but was re-established by the 9th century as Neopatras. The town became prominent as a metropolitan see and was the capital of the Greek principality of Thessaly in 1268–1318 and of the Catalan Duchy of Neopatras from 1319 to 1391. It was conquered by the Ottomans in the early 15th century and remained under Ottoman rule until the Greek War of Independence.

== Geography ==
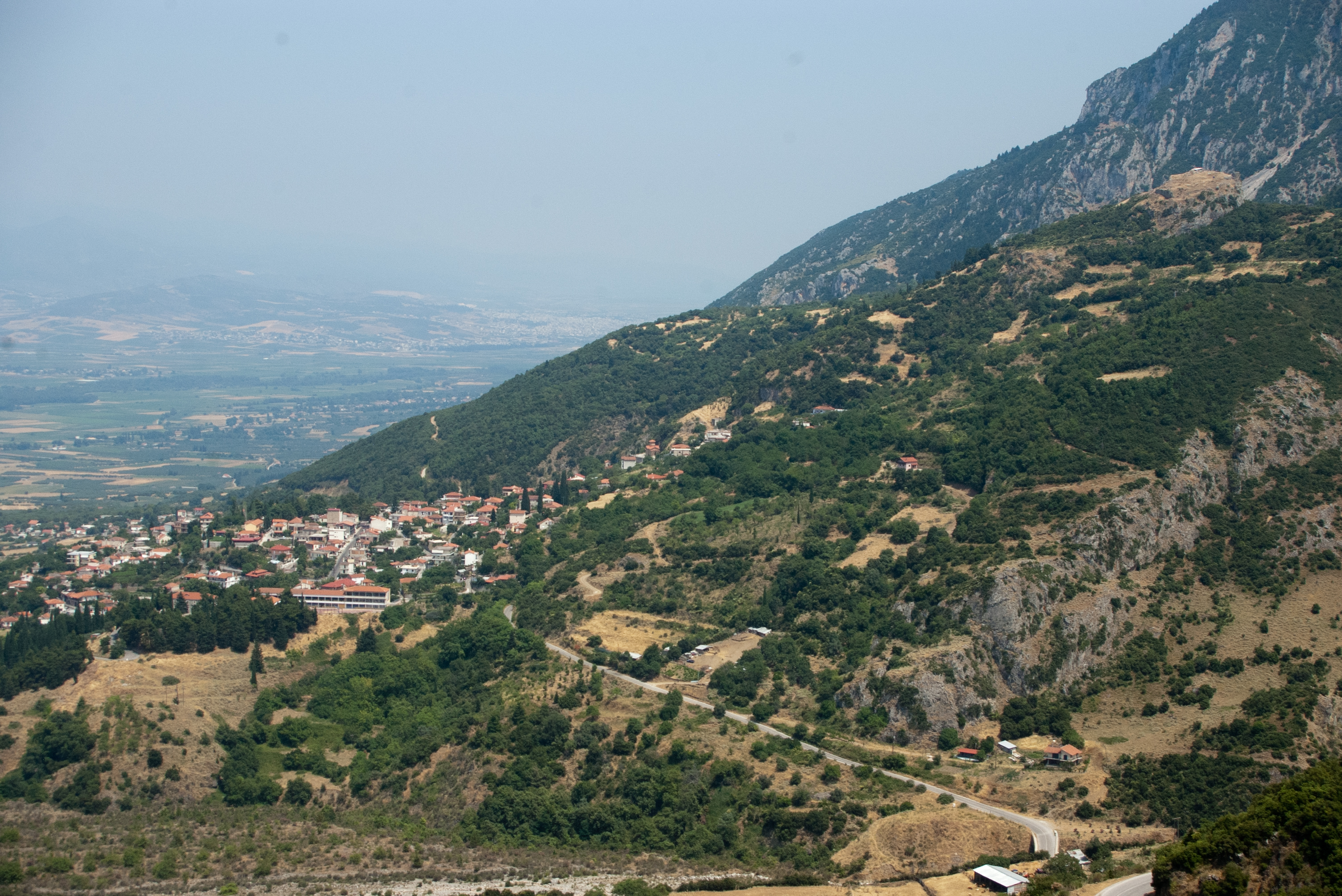
View of Ypati from west

Ypati is around 30 km west of Thermopylae and north of the Oiti mountains and Xerisa river, it is also 25 km west of Lamia south of the EO38 road (Lamia–Karpenissi–Agrinio), around 230 km NNW of Athens and about 50 km east of Karpenissi, it overlooks the Spercheios to the north. The geography includes forests and grasslands to the south in higher elevations. Phocis lies to the south. Around 3 km northwest are the famous springs that date to ancient times. It is around a few kilometres from the mountains.

== History ==
=== Antiquity ===
In Antiquity, the city was known as Hypate (Ὑπάτη) or Hypata (Ὑπάτα), probably a corruption of hypo Oita (ὑπὸ Οἴτα, meaning "near the Mount Oeta").

The city was founded in the late 5th/early 4th century BC, as the capital of the Aenianes tribe and their koinon ("league, commonwealth"). In later times it belonged to the Amphictyony of Amphela. Herodotus records the nearby hot springs (now Loutra Ypatis), which were visited in Antiquity. It was also a polis (city-state).

In around 344 BC, the city came under Macedonian rule, which continued, except for a brief interruption during the Lamian War, until the city became a member of the Aetolian League c. 273 BC. As a member of the League, it was ravaged by the Roman general Manius Acilius Glabrio in 191 BC during his advance through Thessaly during the Roman-Seleucid War, and hosted the Aetolian peace negotiations with Roman general Lucius Valerius Flaccus two years later. After the conclusion of peace between Roman and the Aetolian League, Hypata remained as the only Aetolian possession north of Oeta. In 168 BC, Rome re-established the koinon of the Aenianes as an autonomous polity, with its own eponymous magistrates and coins; Hypata became again its capital, and entered a period of renewed prosperity.

After the Battle of Pydna, from the year 167 BC, the city was independent for a period of about twenty years, until creation of the Aenianian League, a confederation of territories of the Aenianes that was directed by five officials, although in Hypata, the capital, two archons also governed. Aenis, including Hypata, was united with the Thessalian League in the first century BC. Possibly this was done by Augustus following his victory in the Battle of Actium, foundation of Nicopolis, and reorganisation of the Amphictyonic League in 31 BC, but numismatic evidence suggests that it had already occurred before 44 BC. The city remained part of Thessaly thereafter. Under Augustus, the city received the right to refer to itself as "Hypata Augusta," which it continued to do throughout the Roman Imperial period. By the 2nd century AD, it was counted as the most important Thessalian city. The archaeological remains indicate a substantial city.

A local family, who mostly used the names Cyllus and Eubiotus became the league's most prominent family, with members serving as the League's leading magistrate, the general (strategos), until the office was abolished in the mid-second century AD. They also began to participate in wider provincial politics under Domitian, when a Cyllus was manager of the Amphictyonic League at Delphi and received Roman citizenship. In the early second century AD, his son Titus Flavius Eubiotus held the same post, funded the Pythian Games, was high priest of the Imperial cult in Thessaly, and held the post of Helladarch. Another Hypatan of this time, Lucius Cassius Petraeus funded the Pythian Games twice. Both Eubiotus and Petraeus appear as interlocutors in the philosophical dialogues of Plutarch. Hypata joined the Panhellenion, which was established in Athens by Hadrian in 131/2 AD, and Titus Flavius Cyllus, a member of the leading family, funded the Great Penhellenic games organised by the Panhellenion and was the archon of the Panhellenion for AD 153-157. In The Golden Ass, Apuleius presents the area of Hypata as being infested with bandits at this time and a poem written at this time by Ammianus, which mocks Cyllus as a "spear-moron", might indicate that he had undertaken unsuccessful expeditions to suppress this problem. A daughter of the family, Flavia Habroea, who may have a cameo at the beginning of Lucian's Lucius or the Ass, married Marcus Ulpius Leurus, a fellow Thessalian and a Roman consul. Their son Marcus Ulpius Eubiotus Leurus was a consul in the 220s and a major benefactor at Athens around 230. He seems to have been related to Emperor Pupienus in some way.

=== Byzantine, Latin and Ottoman rule ===
Coat of arms of the Duchy of Neopatras

The city is still mentioned in the 6th century under its ancient name by Procopius, who recorded repairs to its walls by Emperor Justinian I, and in the Synecdemus.

The city was probably abandoned after the Slavic invasions of the 7th century, but reappears in the 9th century under the name Neai Patrai (Νέαι Πάτραι, "New Patras") or Patrai Helladikai (Πάτραι Ἑλλαδικαὶ, "Patras in Hellas"). Nicephorus Gregoras, writing in the 14th century, mentions it as being a strongly fortified place in the 12th century. Otherwise, until the 13th century, the city is mentioned only as an ecclesiastical centre (see below).

Coming briefly under Latin rule after the Fourth Crusade, the city was recovered by the ruler of Epirus, Theodore Komnenos Doukas, in 1218. It remained in Epirote hands thereafter, except for a brief period when it was occupied by Nicaean troops after the Battle of Pelagonia in 1259. After c. 1268 it became the capital of the independent principality of Thessaly under John I Doukas and his successors, until the death of John II Doukas in 1318. The Catalan Company seized the city in 1319 and made it the centre of the new Duchy of Neopatras (Catalan: Ducat de Neopàtria), which was joined with the recently conquered Duchy of Athens to the south. Neopatras was one of the last remaining Catalan possessions in Greece, being captured by Nerio Acciaioli in 1391. Three years later it fell to the Ottoman Turks under Bayezid I. The Turks were evicted for a time, in 1402, by Theodore Palaiologos, Despot of the Morea. The Turks recovered it in 1414, the Byzantines again in 1416, until it was definitively conquered by the Ottomans in 1423. Under Ottoman rule, the city became known as Patracık ("Little Patras"), rendered in Greek as Patratziki (Πατρατζίκι).

Early 19th-century sources report that the town was the centre of a kaza (district) in the Sanjak of Inebahti of the Morea Eyalet.

=== Revolutionary period ===
In the Greek War of Independence, Ypati (Patratziki) was the scene of three battles :

- On 18 April 1821, when the Turkish-held town was attacked by the Greek rebels under Mitsos Kondogiannis, Dyovouniotis, Athanasios Diakos and Bakogiannis. The garrison was defeated and negotiations for its surrender began, but the arrival of a large Turkish relief army forced the rebels to withdraw.
- In May 1821, the Greek commanders Yannis Gouras, Skaltsodimos and Safakas intended to attack the town in order to halt the Ottoman advance towards Livadeia. Their forces however were attacked first, and although they beat back the Turkish assault, the plans to take the town were dropped.
- On 2 April 1822, when the town itself was finally taken by the forces of the captains Kondogiannis, Panourgias, Skaltsas and Safakas. The castle, however, with its 1,500-strong garrison, held out. A final attack against it was successful, evicting the garrison, but again the revolutionaries had to withdraw due to the arrival of Ottoman reinforcements from Lamia.

Ypati finally joined Greece in 1830 and revived its ancient name. The municipality of Ypati was founded on January 10, 1834.

=== Modern era ===
The town suffered during the Axis occupation: 15 inhabitants were shot as reprisals for the Gorgopotamos sabotage in 1942.

The worst blow came on 17 June 1944, when the Germans surrounded the town as part of reprisals for attacks by EAM-ELAS partisans based in the region. They executed 28 people, wounded another 30, and burned down 375 out of the town's 400 buildings. A memorial in the town centre commemorates the event and Ypati has been declared a "martyr city" by the Greek state.

== Ecclesiastical history ==
The Greek menologium commemorates, on 28 March, Saint Herodion, traditionally held to be one of 70 disciples mentioned in the Gospel (whom the Apostle Paul of Tarsus calls a relative in Epistle to the Romans, ch.16, v.11) as first bishop of Neopatras.

The city is historically attested as an episcopal see from the 3rd century on. Initially it was a suffragan of the Metropolis of Larissa, in the sway of the Patriarchate of Constantinople. Its first historically documented bishop was Leo, participant at the Council of Costantinople of 879-880 which rehabilitated Patriarch Photios I of Constantinople.

It was raised to a metropolitan bishopric ca. 900, listed in the Notitia Episcopatuum attributed to the Byzantine emperor Leo VI (r. 886–912), as the penultimate metropolitan see under the Patriarchate of Constantinople with one suffragan see, the Diocese of Marmaritzana. A 10th-century seal holds the name of archbishop Cosmas, while the Metropolitan Nicholas signed a synodal decree from Patriarch Sisinius II of Constantinople around 997.

Until the 13th century, the city is most notable as an ecclesiastical centre. In the 12th century it had three suffragans: Marmaritzana (again) plus Diocese of Hagia and Diocese of Bela, but in the 13th century, it was reduced again to Marmaritzana alone, before ceding this too to the Archdiocese of Lamia (Zetounion), probably after 1318. At the turn of the 13th century, its bishop, Euthymios Malakes, was a correspondent of the metropolitan of Athens, Michael Choniates.

After the Fourth Crusade, the city was made a Latin rite archdiocese, the Latin Archbishopric of Neopatras. The see was suppressed after the Greek reconquest, but restored when the Catalans established the Duchy of Neopatras in 1319, and remained active until the Ottoman conquest at the turn of the 15th century. In 1933, it was restored as a Catholic titular see.

== Administrative subdivisions ==
The municipal unit of Ypati is subdivided into the following communities (constituent villages in brackets) :

- Argyrochori
- Dafni
- Kastanea (Kastanea, Kapnochori)
- Kompotades
- Ladikou
- Loutra Ypatis (Loutra Ypatis, Varka, Magoula, Nea Ypati)
- Lychno (Lychno, Alonia)
- Mexiates
- Mesochori Ypatis
- Neochori Ypatis
- Peristeri
- Pyrgos
- Rodonia (Rodonia, Karya)
- Syka Ypatis
- Vasiliki
- Ypati (Ypati, Amalota)

== Population ==
Year	Village	Community	Municipality (after 2011 Mun. Unit)
1991	—	929	6,795
2001	724	849	6,855
2011	496	552	4,541
2021	-	440	3,537

== Archaeology ==
When visited by William Martin Leake in the 19th century, there are still considerable remains of the ancient town. He observed many large quadrangular blocks of stones and foundations of ancient walls on the heights, as well as in the buildings of the town. In the metropolitan church he noticed a handsome shaft of white marble, and on the outside of the wall an inscription in small characters of the best times. He also discovered an inscription on a broken block of white marble, lying under a plane-tree near a fountain in the Jewish cemetery.

== Monuments and sights ==
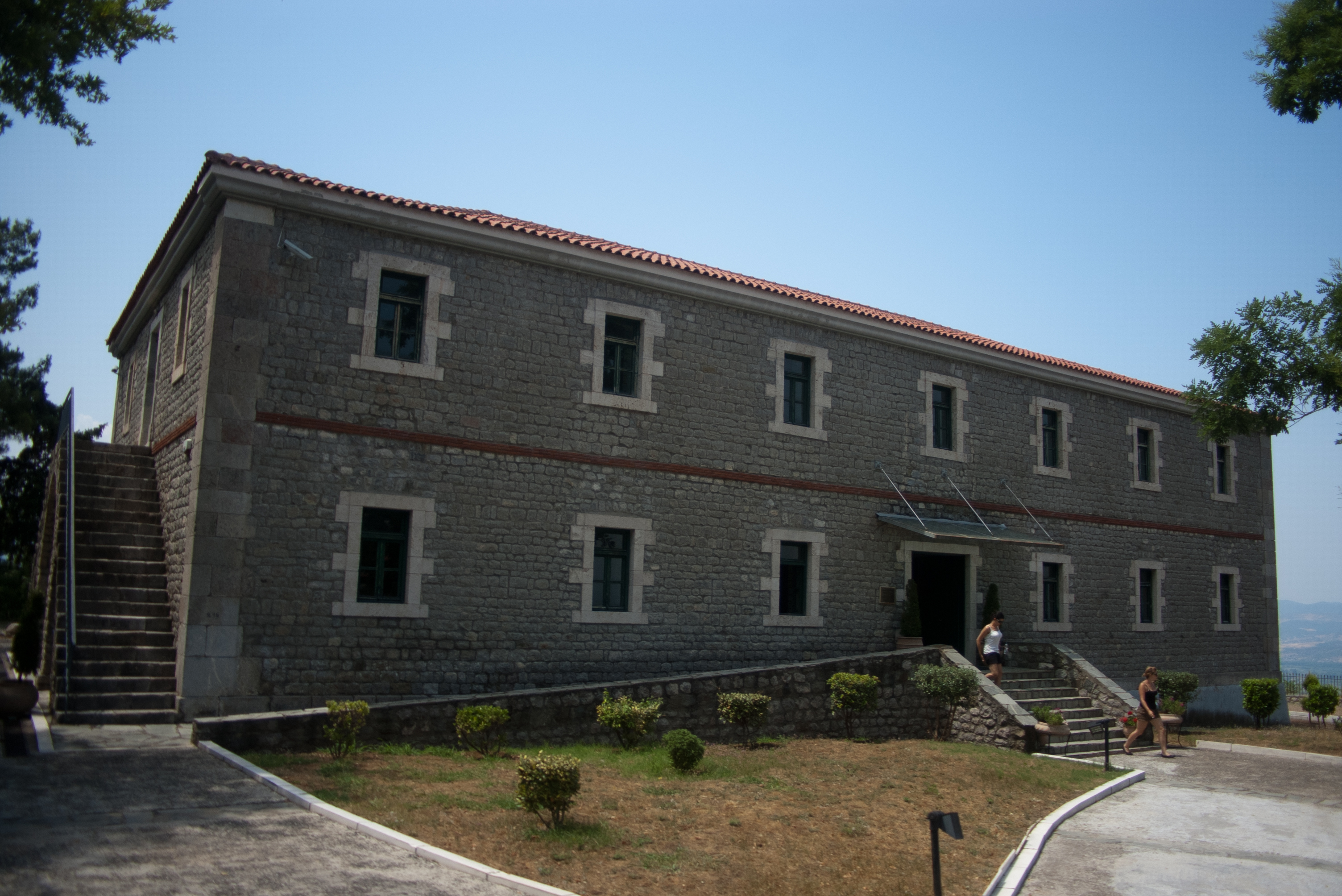
The Byzantine Museum of Phthiotis

The town is still dominated by its medieval castle, probably built in its present form in the 13th century, although the large round tower likely dates to the Catalan period. The castle's last military use was during the Greek Civil War. The castle was restored in 2011–15 with EU funds under the supervision of the 24th Ephorate of Byzantine Antiquities and is open to the public from 19 December 2015.

The Byzantine Museum of Phthiotis, housed in an old barracks building erected in 1836 and open to the public since 2007, features Byzantine artifacts discovered in archaeological digs across the Phthiotis Prefecture, including mosaics and items of daily use, as well as a significant coin collection. The town features also the Byzantine-era Church of Hagia Sophia, built on the site of an older, early Christian church. The church masonry incorporates many pieces of spolia from the early and middle Byzantine periods, as well as the post-Byzantine era. At the southern side, archaeologists have discovered remnants of a 5th-century baptistery. The town's old cathedral church, dedicated to Saint Nicholas, dates to the 18th century, but portions of a mosaic floor and reused architectural elements point to the existence, on the same location, of an early Christian basilica.

Notable sights are also the "Kakogianneio" Astronomical School and planetarium, the traditional water mill at the waterfall near the entrance of the town, and the martyrs' monument at the central town square, dedicated to the people executed by the Germans on 17 June 1944. Due to the proximity of Oeta, Ypati has also become a centre for excursions to the mountain, and is the starting point of several trekking paths.

The 15th-century Agathonos Monastery is located some 3 km west of the town. The monastery also houses the Oiti Natural History Museum, dedicated to the geology, climate, flora and fauna of Mount Oeta and its national park.

== See also ==
- List of Catholic dioceses in Greece

== Sources and external links ==
- Official Website
- GCatholic - (former and) titular Catholic see

Bibliography - ecclesiastical history

- Pius Bonifacius Gams, Series episcoporum Ecclesiae Catholicae, Leipzig 1931, p. 429
- Michel Lequien, Oriens christianus in quatuor Patriarchatus digestus, Paris 1740, Vol. II, coll. 123-126
- Gaetano Moroni, lemma 'Patrasso o Neopatra o Nova Patrasso', in Dizionario di erudizione storico-ecclesiastica, vol. LI, Venice 1851, p. 291
- Konrad Eubel, Hierarchia Catholica Medii Aevi, vol. 1, p. 362; vol. 2, p. XXXII
