= Quintus Tineius Sacerdos =

Roman senator and Consul in 219

Quintus Tineius Sacerdos (c. 160 – aft. 219) was a Roman senator. He is attested as Consul Suffectus 16 March 193 with Publius Julius Scapula Priscus.

As a youth he was a member of the college of the Salii Palatini. Offices he held as an adult included Governor of Bithynia et Pontus, and Proconsul of Asia sometime between 200 and 210. The apex of his career was serving as Consul Ordinarius in 219 with Emperor Elagabalus.

Sacerdos was the son of Quintus Tineius Sacerdos Clemens. His brothers were Quintus Tineius Rufus and Quintus Tineius Clemens. He married Volusia Laodice. They had one daughter, Tineia, who married Titus Clodius Pupienus Pulcher Maximus, with posterity:

- Lucius Clodius Tineius Pupienus Bassus – who assumed the Toga virilis at Rome early in the third century and was made proconsul of Creteand Cyrenaica in 240 A.D. He married Ovinia Paterna, daughter of Lucius Ovinius Pacatianus and Cornelia Optata Aquilia Flavia and had a son:
  - Marcus Tineius Ovinius Castus Pulcher – consul suffectus and pontififf before 274 AD. He had a son by an unknown mother:
    - Ovinius Tineius Tarrutenius Nonius Atticus (fl. 290 AD) – praetor and quindecimviri sacris faciundis. He married a woman named Maxima.

== Family tree ==
Quintus Tineius Sacerdos Clemens consul ordinarius	Marcus Pupienus Maximus
Quintus Tineius Clemens consul ordinarius	Quintius Tineius Rufus consul 182	Quintus Tineius Sacerdos consul suffectus ∞ Volusia Laodice	Pupienus; Roman Emperor (238) ∞ Sextia Cethegilla	Marcus Ulpius Leurus senator
Tineia	Titus Clodius Pupienus Pulcher Maximus consul suffectus	Marcus Pupienus Africanus Maximus consul ordinarius ∞ Cornelia Marullina	Pupiena Sextia Paulina Cethegilla	Marcus Ulpius Eubiotus Leurus suffect consul
Lucius Clodius Tineius Pupienus Bassus proconsul ∞ Ovinia Paterna

Political offices
Preceded by Quintus Pompeius Sosius Falco, and Gaius Julius Erucius Clarus Vibianus as ordinary consuls	Suffect consul of the Roman Empire; 193 with Publius Julius Scapula Priscus	Succeeded by Marcus Silius Messala, and ignotus as suffect consuls
Preceded by Elagabalus, and Marcus Oclatinius Adventus	Consul of the Roman Empire; 219 with Elagabalus	Succeeded by Elagabalus, and Publius Valerius Comazon
