= Marcus Ulpius Eubiotus Leurus =

3rd century Roman senator and consul

Marcus Ulpius Eubiotus Leurus was a Roman senator, who was active during the first part of the third century.

== Life ==
He was suffect consul in one of the nundinia around the year 230. He is known entirely from inscriptions.

He was the son of Marcus Ulpius Leurus and Flavia Habroea, natives of Hypata. Two of his sons are known: Marcus Ulpius Flavius Tisamenus, and Marcus Ulpius Pupienus Maximus. Based on the similarity of his youngest son's name to that of the ephemeral emperor Marcus Clodius Pupienus Maximus, John H. Oliver suggests he may have had some familial connection to the emperor, though he concedes that whether any such relationship existed will remain uncertain. The classicist Ronald Syme suggests that he may have married Pupiena Sextia Paulina Cethegilla, the emperor Pupienus's daughter.

Portions of his cursus honorum are known from an inscription found in Athens praising his generosity during a time of famine. Leurus was eponymous archon of Athens for the term 229/230, and an agonothete of the Panathenaic Games.

== Family tree ==
Quintus Tineius Sacerdos Clemens consul ordinarius	Marcus Pupienus Maximus
Quintus Tineius Clemens consul ordinarius	Quintius Tineius Rufus consul 182	Quintus Tineius Sacerdos consul suffectus ∞ Volusia Laodice	Pupienus; Roman Emperor (238) ∞ Sextia Cethegilla	Marcus Ulpius Leurus senator ∞ Flavia Habroea
Tineia	Titus Clodius Pupienus Pulcher Maximus consul suffectus	Marcus Pupienus Africanus Maximus consul ordinarius ∞ Cornelia Marullina	Pupiena Sextia Paulina Cethegilla	Marcus Ulpius Eubiotus Leurus suffect consul
Lucius Clodius Tineius Pupienus Bassus proconsul ∞ Ovinia Paterna
