= Siege of Aquileia =

Conflict between Maximinus Thrax and Roman Senate (238)

Coordinates: 45.7666°N 13.3666°E

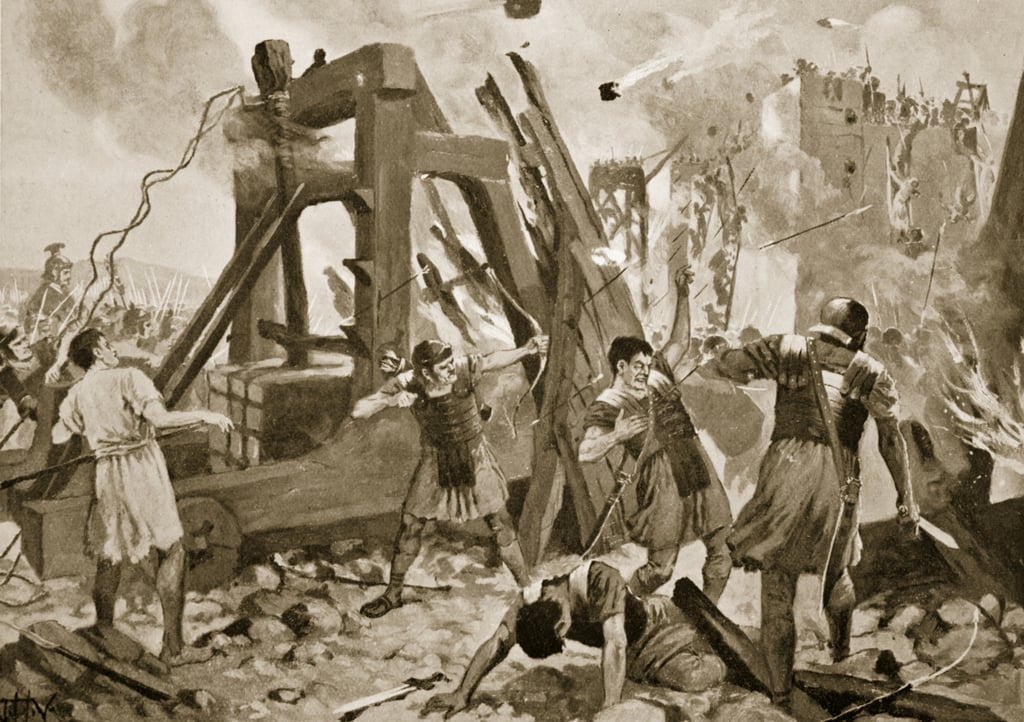
- Illustration by John Harris Valda, envisaging the siege of Aquileia
Date	238
Location	Aquileia
Result	Senatorial victory, assassination of Maximinius Thrax

Belligerents
Forces of Maximinus Thrax	Roman Senate; Citizens of Aquileia

Commanders and leaders
Maximinus Thrax †	Rutilius Pudens Crispinus; Tullius Menophilus

Strength
Unknown	Unknown

Casualties and losses
Heavy	Heavy

The siege of Aquileia was a siege battle that took place in 238 in the town of Aquileia during the Year of the Six Emperors, which resulted in the assassination of Maximinus Thrax.

== Battle ==
=== Origins ===
After the revolt of Gordian I and Gordian II and ascension of Balbinus and Pupienus, Maximinus marched on Rome. He reached the city of Aquileia, expecting an easy victory: the city's walls had long been in disrepair. However under the leadership of senators Rutilius Pudens Crispinus and Tullius Menophilus, the walls were repaired and the city rallied to defend itself in a siege. According to Herodian:

These two had seen to everything with careful attention. With great foresight they had brought into the city supplies of every kind in quantities sufficient to enable it to withstand a long siege. An ample supply of water was available from the many wells in the city, and, a river flowing at the foot of the city wall provided both a defensive moat and an abundance of water.

=== Siege ===
Maximinus' Pannonian legions attacked the walls of the city but were unsuccessful. Maximinus sent envoys to negotiate a surrender, but Crispinus persuaded the town to refuse.

Maximinus' forces besieged the city but found it more difficult than originally thought. Herodian:

They launched numerous assaults virtually every day, and the entire army held the city encircled as if in a net, but the Aquileians fought back determinedly, showing real enthusiasm for war. They had closed their houses and temples and were fighting in a body, together with the women and children, from their advantageous position on the parapet and in the towers. In this way they held off their attackers, and no one was too young or too old to take part in the battle to preserve his native city.

The Aquileians had plenty of food and good morale; they also used weapons to better effect, such as pouring oil on soldiers trying to climb the walls. Herodian:

The army of Maximinus grew depressed and, cheated in its expectations, fell into despair when the soldiers found that those whom they had not expected to hold out against a single assault were not only offering stout resistance but were even beating them back. The Aquileians, on the other hand, were greatly encouraged and highly enthusiastic, and, as the battle continued, their skill and daring increased. Contemptuous of the soldiers now, they hurled taunts at them. As Maximinus rode about, they shouted insults and indecent blasphemies at him and his son. The emperor became increasingly angry because he was powerless to retaliate. Unable to vent his wrath upon the enemy, he was enraged at most of his troop commanders because they were pressing the siege in cowardly and halfhearted fashion. Consequently, the hatred of his supporters increased, and his enemies grew more contemptuous of him each day.

=== Ending ===
Maximinus' soldiers began to lose heart. In addition to being unsuccessful in battle, their supplies were cut off and soldiers began to starve. Their only source of water was a nearby river, into which the Aquileians had thrown corpses, rendering it unfit to drink. Rumours began to circulate that armies against Maximinus were forming elsewhere and were on their way to fight them.

In early May 238 there was a lull in fighting. Soldiers of the Legio II Parthica (usually based at the castra Albana), decided to assassinate the emperor and his son Maximus and end the siege:

The conspirators went to Maximinus' tent about noon. The imperial bodyguard, which was involved in the plot, ripped Maximinus' pictures from the standards; when he came out of his tent with his son to talk to them, they refused to listen and killed them both. They killed the army's commanding general also, and the emperor's close friends. Their bodies were handed over to those who wished to trample and mutilate them, after which the corpses were exposed to the birds and dogs. The heads of Maximinus and his son were sent to Rome. Such was the fate suffered by Maximinus and his son, who paid the penalty for their savage rule.

This led to the end of the siege. Some soldiers were unhappy about this, particularly those close to Maximinus, but they went along with the decision.

Pupienus Maximus visited the city to give thanks and made rousing speeches.

== Depictions ==
The battle was dramatised in the play The Siege of Aquileia: A tragedy by John Home (1722-1808) and in the book by Ian S. Collins Spartinius. The siege of Aquileia is the central setting of "Fire and Sword", which is Book 3 in the Throne of the Caesars historical fiction series by Harry Sidebottom.

== Bibliography ==
- Historia Augusta, Life of Maximinus
- Guida, Giacomo Caspar (2022). L'assedio di Aquileia del 238 d.C: commento storico al libro VIII della Storia dell'Impero romano dopo Marco Aurelio di Erodiano. Udine: Forum. ISBN 9788832833485.
