= Marcus Ulpius Leurus =

Early 3rd-century Roman politician

Marcus Ulpius Leurus was a Roman senator, who was active during the reign of Septimius Severus and Caracalla.

== Life ==
He was suffect consul in some undetermined nundinium in their reigns. He is known entirely from inscriptions, which report little more about his cursus honorum than his consulate.

Leurus had his origins in Thessaly, then part of the province of Macedonia; his gentilicium suggests he is descended from a man who obtained Roman Citizenship in the time of Trajan. Leurus is attested as having married Flavia Habroea; John H. Oliver has traced her paternal lineage, consisting of a number of prominent men of Hypata, for three generations. Together they had a son, Marcus Ulpius Eubiotus Leurus, also a suffect consul around the year 230.

== Family tree ==
Quintus Tineius Sacerdos Clemens consul ordinarius	Marcus Pupienus Maximus
Quintus Tineius Clemens consul ordinarius	Quintius Tineius Rufus consul 182	Quintus Tineius Sacerdos consul suffectus ∞ Volusia Laodice	Pupienus; Roman Emperor (238) ∞ Sextia Cethegilla	Marcus Ulpius Leurus senator ∞ Flavia Habroea
Tineia	Titus Clodius Pupienus Pulcher Maximus consul suffectus	Marcus Pupienus Africanus Maximus consul ordinarius ∞ Cornelia Marullina	Pupiena Sextia Paulina Cethegilla	Marcus Ulpius Eubiotus Leurus suffect consul
Lucius Clodius Tineius Pupienus Bassus proconsul ∞ Ovinia Paterna
