= Tineia gens =

Ancient Roman family

The gens Tineia was a Roman family of imperial times. Members of this gens first appear in history in the time of Hadrian; the first to obtain the consulship was Quintus Tineius Rufus in AD 127.

== Origin ==
The Tineii of the second and third centuries lived at Side, in Pamphylia. They may have been an old Roman family that had migrated to Asia Minor, where Italian migrants had settled since the first century BC; however, it was not uncommon for men from the Eastern Mediterranean, without any connection with Italy, to reach the Roman nobility in this period. For example, Arrian, a Greek, was consul circa AD 132, and Marcus Julius Philippus, a native of Arabia Petraea, became emperor in 244.

A funerary monument from Rome identifies one of the Tineii as a member of the tribus Sabatina, corresponding with the region of Sabinum; this may imply that the Tineii were originally a Sabine family, although the man who built it was a native of Nicomedia in Bithynia. Nomina ending in -eius were common under the Republic, and frequently belonged to families of Sabine origin.

== Praenomina ==
The main praenomen of the Tineii was Quintus, which the Tineii Rufi used to the exclusion of all others; in this family the praenomen was fossilized, and passed down to all of the sons in the family, with no distinguishing function; instead the sons would typically be distinguished by their surnames. Different praenomina are occasionally found among the other Tineii, including Lucius, Marcus, and Gaius; like Quintus, these were among the most common names throughout Roman history.

== Branches and cognomina ==
The only distinct family of the Tineii bore the cognomen Rufus, red. This was a common surname, typically given to those who had red hair. Several members of this family bore additional cognomina, including Sacerdos, a priest, and Clemens, pleasant or gentle. Surnames derived from occupations and individual traits were very typical of Roman cognomina.

== Members ==
This list includes abbreviated praenomina. For an explanation of this practice, see filiation.

=== Tineii Rufi ===
- Quintus Tineius Rufus, governor of Thrace in AD 124, during the reign of Hadrian, and consul suffectus from the Kalends of May to the Kalends of October in 127. He was governor of Judaea from at least 130 to 132, at the beginning of the Bar Kochba rebellion.
- Quintus Tineius Q. f. Sacerdos Clemens, consul ordinarius in AD 158. Son of Quintus Tineius Rufus, the consul of 124, he was created a patrician, and made a member of the College of Pontifices (Note: Only patricians could become members of this college.) by the emperor Antoninus Pius. Three of his sons also became consul.
- Quintus Tineius Q. f. Q. n. Rufus, consul ordinarius in AD 182, was one of the Salii Palatini.
- Quintus Tineius Q. f. Q. n. Sacerdos, consular legate in Bithynia from 189 to 190, and consul suffectus in AD 192; he became Proconsul of Asia circa 210. He was consul ordinarius with Elagabalus in 219.
- Quintus Tineius Q. f. Q. n. Clemens, consul ordinarius in AD 195.
- Quintus Tineius, governor of Achaea, may be identified with one of the consular Tineii, but which is uncertain.

=== Others ===
- Tineia Lucida, dedicated a tomb at Rome for her husband, Publius Aelius Verus.
- Tineia Antonia, buried at Rome, with a tomb dedicated by her sister, Tineia Hygeia, dating to the second century AD.
- Tineia Hygeia, dedicated a tomb at Rome for her sister, Tineia Antonia, some time during the second century.
- Quintus Tineius Demetrius, prefect of Egypt from AD 189 to 190.
- Marcus Tineius Ovinius L. f. Casto Pulchro, a senator and pontifex, had been quaestor urbanus, and a candidate for the praetorship.
- Quintus Tineius Dorus, husband of Pulchra Domna, and father of Quintus Tineius Primigenius.
- Quintus Tineius Q. f. Primigenius, son of Quintus Tineius Dorus and Pulchra Domna, for whom he built a tomb at Aternum in Sabinum.
- Quintus Tineius Primigenius, possibly a freedman, buried with Vibia Psyche at Mutina in Etruria.
- Quintus Tineius Herculanus, buried at Rome, aged twelve.
- Quintus Tineius Q. f. Her[mes?], a soldier from Nicomedia, and the husband of Tineia Hieropis, buried a child at Rome.
- Tineia Hieropis, wife of Quintus Tineius Hermes.
- Quintus Tineius Eusebes, husband of Postumia Callityche, buried at Rome, aged twenty-two.
- Gaius Tineius C. f. Threptus, named in an inscription from Rome.
- Tineius Longus, a cavalry prefect under Ulpius Marcellus, governor of Britain during the reign of Commodus. An inscription from Condercum indicates that he was quaestor designatus, but whether he entered office, and if so which year, cannot be determined.
- Marcus Tineius, named in an inscription from Ara Bona in Pannonia Superior.
- Tineia Primitiva, buried at Castellum Tidditanorum in Numidia, aged seventy-nine.
- Lucius Clodius Tineius Pupienus Bassus, a young man from a senatorial family, who assumed the Toga virilis at Rome early in the third century.
- Tineius Eubulus, freedman of the mother of Lucius Clodius Tineius Pupienus Bassus.
- Quintus Tineius Severus Petronianus, curator rei publicae, probably at Nicaea, in AD 244.

== See also ==
- List of Roman gentes

== Bibliography ==
- Codex Theodosianus.
- Digesta, or Pandectae (The Digest).
- Theodor Mommsen et alii, Corpus Inscriptionum Latinarum (The Body of Latin Inscriptions, abbreviated CIL), Berlin-Brandenburgische Akademie der Wissenschaften (1853–present).
- Giovanni Battista de Rossi, Inscriptiones Christianae Urbis Romanae Septimo Saeculo Antiquiores (Christian Inscriptions from Rome of the First Seven Centuries, abbreviated ICUR), Vatican Library, Rome (1857–1861, 1888).
- René Cagnat et alii, L'Année épigraphique (The Year in Epigraphy, abbreviated AE), Presses Universitaires de France (1888–present).
- George Davis Chase, "The Origin of Roman Praenomina", in Harvard Studies in Classical Philology, vol. VIII, pp. 103–184 (1897).
- Paul von Rohden, Elimar Klebs, & Hermann Dessau, Prosopographia Imperii Romani (The Prosopography of the Roman Empire, abbreviated PIR), Berlin (1898).
- Stéphane Gsell, Inscriptions Latines de L'Algérie (Latin Inscriptions from Algeria, abbreviated ILAlg), Edouard Champion, Paris (1922–present).
- John C. Traupman, The New College Latin & English Dictionary, Bantam Books, New York (1995).
- Brill's New Pauly: Encyclopaedia of the Ancient World (2002–2014).
