= Sextus Sulpicius Tertullus =

2nd century Roman senator and consul

Sextus Sulpicius Tertullus was a Roman senator active in the mid-2nd century. He held the consulship in 158 with Quintus Sacerdos as his colleague. Tertullus was afterwards proconsular governor of Asia in 173/174. He is known entirely from inscriptions.

Political offices
Preceded by Quintus Vilius Proculus, and Q. [...]binus	Consul of the Roman Empire; 158 with Quintus Tineius Sacerdos Clemens	Succeeded by Marcus Servilius Fabianus Maximus, and Quintus Iallius Bassius
