= Tullius Menophilus =

Roman senator and general (died 241)

Tullius Menophilus was a Roman Senator and General who led the defense at the Siege of Aquileia along with Rutilius Pudens Crispinus.

== Background ==
The name Menophilus might indicate that he originates in his past from the Greek speaking east of the Roman empire where Greek was the dominant language and culture.

He was later rewarded with the governorship of Lower Moesia in 238–241. The position indicates that Menophilus was of consular rank since the legate of Moesia Inferior was a former consul.

He was executed in 241 in the reign of Gordian III. The reasons are not recorded in the ancient sources and, in the absence of more precise dating, it cannot be determined whether his fall from grace was related to the abortive revolt of Sabinianus in Africa in 240 or to the appointment of Timesitheus as praetorian prefect and the loss of influence of the previously dominant court-faction that had looked to the mother of the emperor Gordian III. All that can be said with any certainty concerning the downfall of Menophilus was that it related to the troubled aftermath of the senatorial overthrow of the emperor Maximinus Thrax.
