= Antony of Larissa =

Antony (Greek: Ἀντώνιος) was the metropolitan bishop of Larissa in 1340–62. In 1359–62, he also served as katholikos krites ton Rhomaion. He was the author of several homilies.

== Sources ==
- Trapp, Erich; Beyer, Hans-Veit; Walther, Rainer; Sturm-Schnabl, Katja; Kislinger, Ewald; Leontiadis, Ioannis; Kaplaneres, Sokrates (1976–1996). Prosopographisches Lexikon der Palaiologenzeit (in German). Vienna: Verlag der Österreichischen Akademie der Wissenschaften. ISBN 3-7001-3003-1.
