= Marcus Pupienus Africanus Maximus =

Consul of the Roman Empire in 236

Marcus Pupienus Africanus Maximus (c. 200 – aft. 236 AD) was a Roman senator.

== Life ==
He was consul ordinarius in 236 as the colleague of emperor Maximinus I. Maximus was the son of Pupienus, later emperor, and Sextia Cethegilla.

He married Cornelia Marullina, born c. 205, daughter of Lucius Cornelius Cossonius Scipio Salvidius Orfitus and wife, and had two children: Pupiena Sextia Paulina Cethegilla, born c. 225 and named after her paternal aunt, who married Marcus Maecius Probus, and Publius Pupienus Maximus.

== Family tree ==
Quintus Tineius Sacerdos Clemens consul ordinarius	Marcus Pupienus Maximus
Quintus Tineius Clemens consul ordinarius	Quintius Tineius Rufus consul 182	Quintus Tineius Sacerdos consul suffectus ∞ Volusia Laodice	Pupienus; Roman Emperor (238) ∞ Sextia Cethegilla	Marcus Ulpius Leurus senator
Tineia	Titus Clodius Pupienus Pulcher Maximus consul suffectus	Marcus Pupienus Africanus Maximus consul ordinarius ∞ Cornelia Marullina	Pupiena Sextia Paulina Cethegilla	Marcus Ulpius Eubiotus Leurus suffect consul
Lucius Clodius Tineius Pupienus Bassus proconsul ∞ Ovinia Paterna

Political offices
Preceded by Gnaeus Claudius Severus, and Lucius Titus Claudius Quintianus	Consul of the Roman Empire; 236 with Maximinus Thrax	Succeeded by Lucius Marius Perpetuus, and Lucius Mummius Felix Cornelianus
