= Pupiena Sextia Paulina Cethegilla =

Pupiena Sextia Paulina Cethegilla was the daughter of Roman emperor Marcus Clodius Pupienus Maximus (r. 238 CE). Her name is mentioned on an inscription from Volterra, where she was honored by her nutritores—two freedmen named Pupienus Eutychianus and Pupienius Philumenus. She is also mentioned on a lead pipe that may have been discovered in the Piazza Vittorio Emanuele on the Esquiline hill in Rome. The classicist Ronald Syme suggests that she may have married Marcus Ulpius Eubiotus Leurus.
