= Polykarpos Bithikoukis =

Polykarpos Bithikoukis, surnamed Dardaios (Albanian: Polikarp Boçi (Vithëkuqi) Dardhari, Greek: Πολύκαρπος Μπιθικούκης ο Δαρδαίος), was the Metropolitan of Larissa in 1811–18 and 1820–21.

An Albanian from Dardhë, he was elevated to the metropolis of Larissa through the favour of his compatriot, the powerful Ali Pasha of Ioannina, and was, according to his own account, the only metropolitan of Albanian birth in his time. Prior to that, he was Bishop of the Troad. When the British traveller Sir Henry Holland visited Larissa in 1812, he was hosted at the metropolitan residence in Larissa. Holland describes Polykarpos as "not having yet reached his fortieth year", "naturally tall and well formed", with a long black beard.

In 1818 he was forced to abandon his see after repeated complaints from his flock over his oppressiveness and exactions. He returned in 1820, on the heels of Mahmud Dramali Pasha's campaign against Ali Pasha. Following the outbreak of the Greek War of Independence in early 1821, and the rebellion of the Greeks of Mount Pelion, however, the mistrustful Dramali suspected the bishop of collusion with the rebels, and had him executed. As a result, he is considered a martyr in modern Greece.

== Sources ==
- Holland, Sir Henry (1819). Travels in the Ionian Isles, Albania, Thessaly, Macedonia, &c. during the years 1812 and 1813, Volume 1. Longman, Hurst, Rees, Orme, and Brown.
