= Marcus Servilius Fabianus Maximus =

2nd century Roman senator, consul and governor

Marcus Servilius Fabianus Maximus was a Roman senator, who was active during the reigns of Antoninus Pius and Marcus Aurelius. He was suffect consul in a nundinium in mid-158 with Quintus Jallius Bassus as his colleague. A native of North Africa, Maximus was the younger brother of Marcus Servilius Silanus, suffect consul in 152, and a relative of Quintus Servilius Pudens, brother-in-law of emperor Lucius Verus.

== Career ==
His cursus honorum is partially known from an inscription set up in Rome. His first recorded office was quattuorviri viarum curandarum, one of the magistracies that comprised the vigintiviri; membership in one of these four boards was a preliminary and required first step toward gaining entry into the Roman Senate. This was followed with his commission as military tribune with Legio I Minervia, stationed at Bonna (modern Bonn), in Germania Inferior. Maximus returned to Rome where he was elected quaestor, which he served at the city of Rome; upon completion of this traditional Republican magistracy he would be enrolled in the Senate. Following this he served as ab actis Senatus, or recorder of the Acta Senatus. Two more of the traditional Republican magistracies followed: curule aedile and praetor.

After stepping down from the office of praetor, Maximus was selected to serve as legatus or adjunct to the proconsular governor of Asia; Géza Alföldy dates his office to circa 146. This was followed by a series of imperial appointments. First was curator of the Via Valeria; Alföldy dates his appointment to this curatorship between the years 147 and 150. Then Maximus was commissioned legatus legionis or commander of Legio III Gallica, which was stationed in Syria. Alföldy dates his tenure as commander from around the year 150 to 153. After returning to Rome, he was appointed prefectus aerarum Saturninus, which Alföldy dates between the years 153 and 156. His consulate followed.

The consular portion of Maximus included three appointments. First was curator aedium sacrarum, or overseer of temples, which Alföldy dates to around the year 160. His next appointment was as governor of Moesia Superior, which Alföldy dates from the year 161 to 162. In that later year Marcus Jallius Bassus became a member of the Emperor Marcus Aurelius' comes or inner circle of advisors during the Parthian War, and Maximus was appointed to replace him as governor of Moesia Inferior; according to Alföldy, he held this governorship until the year 166.

Maximus' life is a blank after he left the second governorship.

Political offices
Preceded by ignotus, then Sextus Sulpicius Tertullus, and Quintus Tineius Sacerdos Clemens as ordinary consuls	Suffect consul of the Roman Empire; 158 with Quintus Jallius Bassus	Succeeded by ignotus, then Quintus Pomponius Musa, and Lucius Cassius Juvenalis as suffect consuls
