= Quintus Tineius Sacerdos Clemens =

2nd century Roman senator and consul

Quintus Tineius Sacerdos Clemens (c. 100 – aft. 170) was a Roman senator, who was Consul Ordinarius in 158 with Sextus Sulpicius Tertullus, and Pontifex.

An inscription at Side honored Clemens and his son Quintus Tineius Rufus as patroni.

He was the son of Quintus Tineius Rufus. Besides Rufus, Clemens' known sons include Quintus Tineius Sacerdos and Quintus Tineius Clemens.

== Family tree ==
Quintus Tineius Sacerdos Clemens consul ordinarius	Marcus Pupienus Maximus
Quintus Tineius Clemens consul ordinarius	Quintius Tineius Rufus consul 182	Quintus Tineius Sacerdos consul suffectus ∞ Volusia Laodice	Pupienus; Roman Emperor (238) ∞ Sextia Cethegilla	Marcus Ulpius Leurus senator
Tineia; Tineia gens	Titus Clodius Pupienus Pulcher Maximus consul suffectus	Marcus Pupienus Africanus Maximus consul ordinarius ∞ Cornelia Marullina	Pupiena Sextia Paulina Cethegilla	Marcus Ulpius Eubiotus Leurus suffect consul
Lucius Clodius Tineius Pupienus Bassus proconsul ∞ Ovinia Paterna

Political offices
Preceded by Quintus Vilius Proculus, and Q. [...]binus	Consul of the Roman Empire; 158 with Sextus Sulpicius Tertullus	Succeeded by Marcus Servilius Fabianus Maximus, and Quintus Iallius Bassius
