= Rutilius Pudens Crispinus =

3rd century Roman senator and general

Rutilius Pudens Crispinus was a Roman senator and general who led the forces at the Siege of Aquileia along with Tullius Menophilus.

He was favoured by Caracalla but demoted during the rule of Macrinus and Heliogabalus. He returned to grace during the reign of Alexander Severus before leading the Senate forces during the siege. He was also favoured by Gordian III.

During the Siege, the forces of Maximinus sent envoys to the city promising them mercy if they surrendered. Herodian records:

Fearing that the people, convinced by these lying promises, might choose peace instead of war and throw open the gates, Crispinus ran along the parapet, pleading with the Aquileians to hold out bravely and offer stout resistance; he begged them not to break faith with the Senate and the Roman people, but to win a place in history as the saviors and defenders of all Italy. He warned them not to trust the promises of a tyrant, a liar, and a hypocrite, and not to surrender to certain destruction, lulled by soft words, when they could put their trust in the always unpredictable outcome of war. Often, he continued, few have prevailed over many and those who appeared to be weaker have overcome those assumed to be stronger. Nor should they be frightened by the size of the besieging army. "Those who fight on another's behalf," he said, "well aware that the benefits, if any should result, will be not theirs but his, are less eager to do battle, knowing that while they share the risks, another will reap the greatest prizes of the victory. But those who fight for their native land can look for greater favor from the gods because they do not pray for help in seizing the property of others, but ask only to be allowed to retain in safety what is already theirs. They show an enthusiasm for battle which results not from the orders of another but from their own inner compulsion, since all the fruits of victory belong to them and them alone." By saying such things as these, Crispinus, who was venerable by nature and highly skilled in speaking Latin, and had governed the Aquileians moderately, succeeded in persuading them to remain at their assigned posts; he ordered the envoys to return unsuccessful to Maximinus. He is said to have persevered in his prosecution of the war because the many men in the city who were skilled at auguries and the taking of auspices reported that the omens favored the townspeople.
