= Ignatios Lappas =

Greek Orthodox metropolitan bishop (1946–2018)

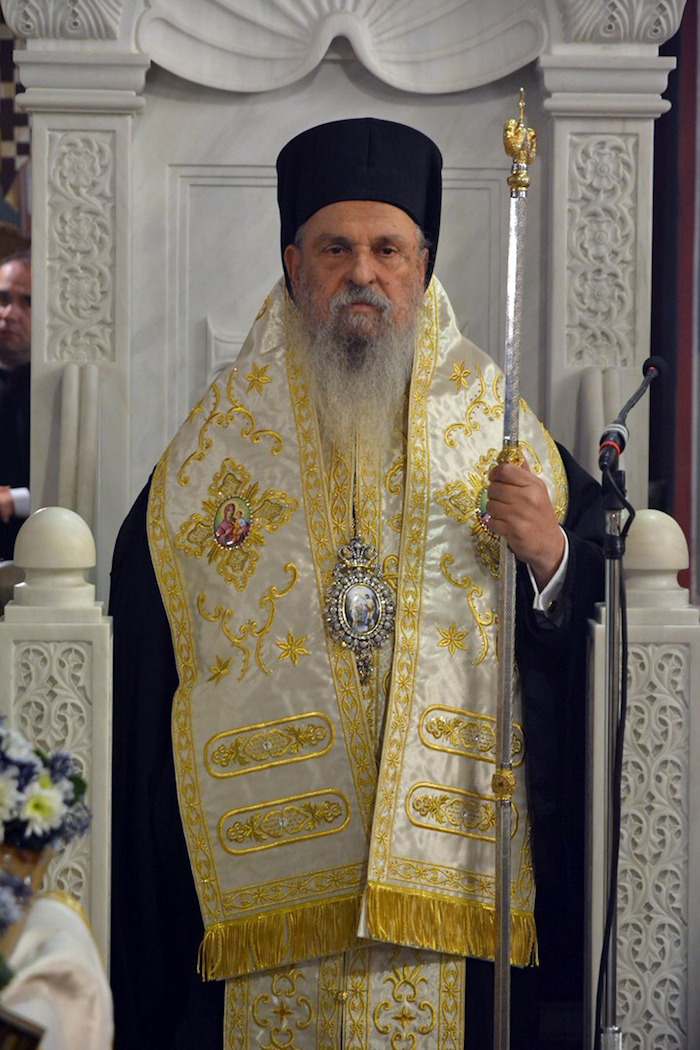
Bishop Ignatios Lappas in 2008.

Ignatios Lappas (1 January 1946 – 26 June 2018) was a Greek Orthodox metropolitan bishop who served as the Metropolis of Larissa and Tyrnavos, located in Thessaly, from 25 May 1994 until his death on 26 June 2018.

Metropolitan Ignatios Lappas died of heart failure in Miami, Florida, United States, on 26 June 2018, at the age of 72.
