= Bessarion II of Larissa =

Bessarion II (Greek: Βησσαρίων Β΄, fl. 1489/90–1540) was a metropolitan bishop of Larissa and a saint of the Eastern Orthodox Church.

He was born Vasileios Tsigaridas (Βασίλειος Τσιγαρίδας) or Ganas (Γκανάς), in the village of Porta. His family had a tradition of monasticism, and at the age of 10 he became a novice monk to the Metropolitan of Larissa Mark. He advanced rapidly, being consecrated a deacon, a presbyter, and at age 20 he was appointed bishop of the Thessalian villages of Domeniko and Elassona. However, his very youth caused the local inhabitants to reject him, so that he returned to serve alongside Metropolitan Mark for four more years, before being appointed exarch of the bishopric of Stagoi. Finally, in 1526/7, when Mark died, he succeeded him as Metropolitan of Larissa with the support of both the local clergy and the people. For two years, he remained as locum tenens of Stagoi as well.

His tenure was marked by important social and charitable work, particularly with the construction of the Korakou and Portaikos bridges. Along with his brother Ignatius, who was the Bishop of Kappoua and Fanari, he re-founded the Dousikou Monastery. The katholikon founded by Bessarion was later replaced by another, still surviving one, by his nephew, Metropolitan Neophytus II of Larissa.

He died on 13 September 1540 and was buried in the Church of St. Nicholas in the village of Agios Vissarion, which now bears his name. His head is preserved in the Dousikou Monastery as a relic.
