= Crete and Cyrenaica =

Province of the Roman Empire (67 BC – c. 267 AD)

Coordinates: 35.0621°N 24.9470°E

Province of Crete and Cyrenaica Provincia Creta et Cyrenae (Latin) Ἐπαρχία Κρήτης καὶ Κυρήνης (Koine Greek)
- Province of the Roman Empire
- 67 BC–c. 267 AD
- Roman province of Creta et Cyrenae highlighted.
- Capital: Gortyna
- History
  - Established: 67 BC
  - Disestablished: c. 267 AD
Preceded by	Succeeded by
Roman Cyrenaica; Cretan League	Byzantine Crete; Libya Superior
- Today part of: Greece; Libya

Crete and Cyrenaica (Latin: Creta et Cyrenaica, Koine Greek: Κρήτη καὶ Κυρηναϊκή, romanized: Krḗtē kaì Kyrēnaïkḗ) was a senatorial province of the Roman Republic and later the Roman Empire, established in 67 BC, which included the island of Crete and the region of Cyrenaica in modern-day Libya. These areas were settled by Greek colonists from the eighth to sixth centuries BC. After Alexander the Great's death, his short-lived empire was partitioned between his generals during the Wars of the Diadochi. Cyrenaica ended up under Egyptian rule, except for Crete, which remained independent.

== Apion's will and Roman rule of Cyrenaica ==
Ptolemy Apion, the last king of the Hellenistic Kingdom of Cyrenaica left his kingdom to the Roman Republic when he died childless in 96 BC. Rome readily accepted this inheritance from Ptolemy Apion but preferred to leave the administration to local rulers, rather than enforcing direct control. However, by the 70s BC, civil uprisings by Jewish settlers began to destabilise the province and the Senate was forced to take action. In 74 BC, they sent a low level official, the quaestor Cornelius Lentulus Marcellinus, to officially annex Cyrenaica as a Roman province and restore order. That the Senate sent such a low-ranking official indicates the political difficulty the Republic had in governing its growing empire, as well as indicating the ease with which Cyrenaica was willing to submit to Roman governance and the stability it brought.

== Roman conquest of Crete ==
Marcus Antonius Creticus attacked Crete in 71 BC and was repelled. Then in 69 BC, Rome commissioned Quintus Caecilius Metellus and, following a ferocious three-year campaign, Crete was conquered for Rome in 66 BC, Metellus earning the agnomen "Creticus" as an honour for his conquest and subjugation of Crete.

== Province ==
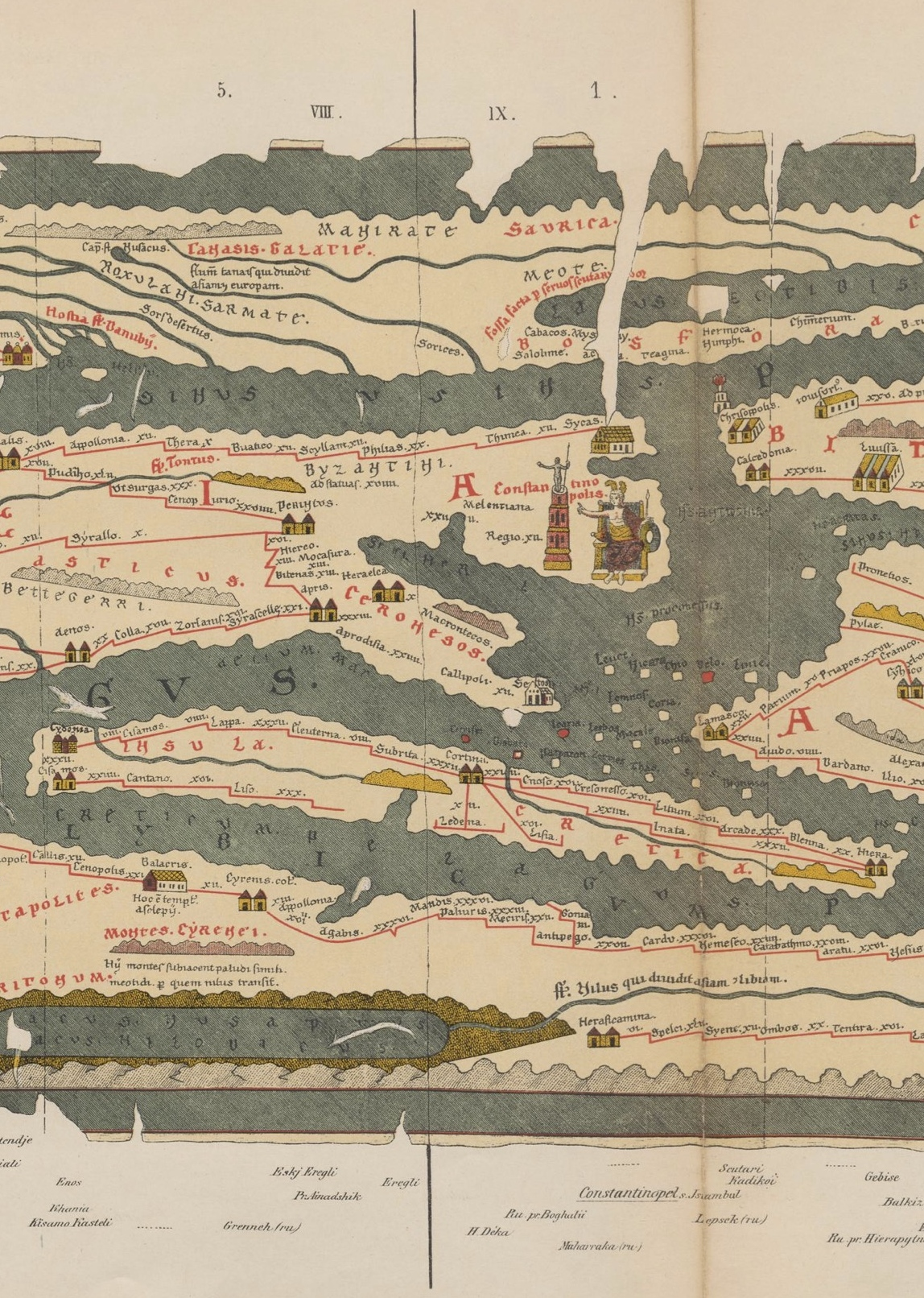
Section of Tabula Peutingeriana with Cyrenaica in the bottom and Crete (Insula Cretica) above it

In 67 BC, Crete and Cyrenaica were combined into a single province with its capital at Gortyn in Crete. In 117 AD, a Jewish revolt erupted in Cyrenaica, resulting in the death of two hundred and twenty thousand people. In 298 AD, Diocletian, because of geographic inconvenience, separated the province of Crete from Cyrenaica, which in turn was divided between Libya Superior or Libya Pentapolis, with Cyrene as its capital, and Libya Inferior or Libya Sicca, with Paraetonium as its capital.

=== List of Roman governors ===
- C. Clodius Vestalis (between 30 BC and AD 14)
- M. Titius (between 30 BC and AD 14)
- Pomponius Secundus (between AD 37 and 54)
- Fabius (before 13 BC)
- P. Sextius Scaeva (7/6 BC)
- Q. Lucanius Proculus (after 13 BC)
- L. Plotius Vicinas (between 2 BC and AD 7)
- (Lollius) Palicanus (between 30 BC and AD 14)
- Marcus Nonius Balbus (between 30 BC and AD 14)
- (Vettius) Scato (between 23 BC and AD 12)
- Gaius Rubellius Blandus (between 30 BC and AD 14)
- (Titus) Caesius Cordus (c. AD 12)
- P. Octavius (between AD 14 and 29)
- Occius Flamma (between AD 14 and 37)
- Cornelius Lupus (between AD 14 and 37)
- P. Viriasius Naso
- Celer
- Augurinus (between AD 37 and 41)
- Q. Cassius Gratus (before 53)
- Caesernius Veiento (46/47?)
- Publius Pomponius Secundus (between 37 and 54)
- Cestius Proculus (before 56)
- Pedius Blaesus (before 59)
- Bruttidius Sabinus (first half 1st century)
- Lucius Turpilius Dexter (64/65)
- Titus Atilius Rufus (67)
- Aulus Minicius Rufus (71/72)
- Catullus (72/73)
- Gaius Arinius Modestus (73-75)
- Silo
- Aulus Julius Quadratus (84/85)
- Gaius Pomponius Gallus Didius Rufus (88/89)
- Gaius Memmius [...] (98/99)
- Lucius Elufrius Severus (99/100)
- Lucius Aemilius Honoratus (between 97 and 118)
- Titus Vibius Varus (between 97 and 118)
- Salvius Carus (134/135)
- Quintus Caecilius Marcellus Dentilianus (c. 140)
- Quintus Julius Potitus (between 138 and 161)
- Gaius Claudius Titianus Demostratus (161/162)
- Pomponius Naevianus (between 165 and 169)
- Veturius Paccianus (before 168)
- Lucius Saevinius Proculus (173/174)
- Quintus Caecilius Rufinus (between 160 and 180)
- Quintus Servilius Pudens (164/165)
- Lucius Clodius Tineius Pupienus Bassus (250)
