= Bessarion (designer) =

Georgian fashion designer

Bessarion (stylized as BEssARION) (Georgian: ბესარიონი; Ukrainian: Бессаріон) born Besik Razmadze is a Georgian fashion designer based in Ukraine. Bessarion was born in Tbilisi. He was named after the Georgian poet Besarion Gabashvili known as Besiki.

Bessarion-designed shirts with Georgian inscriptions made in Georgian alphabet like სიყვარული (Love) and იესო, which is only Georgian word that can be written in the shape of cross (Jesus) became popular and was worn by many celebrities.
