= Caecilia Paulina =

Wife of Roman Emperor Maximinus Thrax

- Augusta
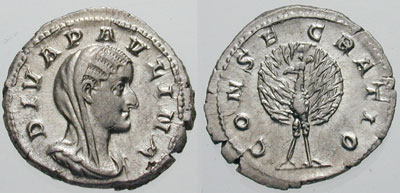
- Denarius of Diva Paulina.

Empress of the Roman Empire
- Tenure: 235/236
- Died: 235/236
- Spouse: Emperor Maximinus Thrax
- Issue: Caesar Gaius Julius Verus Maximus
Names
- Caecilia Paulina Pia
Regnal name
- Caecilia Paulina Pia Augusta
Posthumous name
- Diva Caecilia Paulina Pia Augusta

Caecilia Paulina (died 235/236) was a Roman Empress and consort to Emperor Maximinus Thrax, who ruled in 235–238.

== Name ==
Her full titulature, Diva Caecilia Paulina Pia Augusta, is preserved on an inscription (CIL X, 5054). On her coins she is termed simply Diva Paulina. The coins with her inscription were not struck during her life, but some time later, probably after she was deified. No sculptural likenesses of her survive.

== Life ==
Almost nothing is known about her life, as ancient writers rarely mentioned her by name. Her husband never set foot in Rome, thus it is likely that neither did she, at least in her time married to the Emperor. She lived during the Crisis of the Third Century, a time of the crumbling and near collapse of the Roman Empire, caused by three simultaneous crises: external invasion, internal civil war, and economic collapse. While the 4th century historian Ammianus Marcellinus wrote about Paulina in his book on the Gordian emperors, this part of his work was lost, only the sections of his History covering the period 353–378 are extant. In a later passage, however, Marcellinus refers to the Empress as the good wife of the difficult husband who had:

... led him back into the paths of truth and mercy, by feminine gentleness, as, in recounting the acts of the Gordiani, we have related to have been done by the wife of that truculent emperor Maximinus

— Ammianus Marcellinus, Roman History

Paulina had one son, Gaius Julius Verus Maximus, appointed Caesar in 236 by his father, but both men were murdered by the soldiers in May 238. Paulina probably died around late 235 or early 236, as Maximus had her deified in 236.

The city of Anazarbus in Cilicia struck coins in the name of "Thea Paulina" (the Greek equivalent of "Diva Paulina"), and dated them to the year 254 of that city's era which converts to 235/236 of the modern calendar. That Paulina is referred to as divine on the coins indicates that she was dead when the coins were produced.

Joannes Zonaras claims that Maximinus executed his wife, but that accusation is unproven, and improbable if she was deified by her husband.

== See also ==
- Year of the Six Emperors

Royal titles
Preceded by Sallustia Orbiana	Empress of Rome c. 235	Succeeded by Tranquillina
