= Byzantine Museum of Phthiotis =

Museum in Ypati, Greece

Coordinates: 38°52′19″N 22°14′14″E

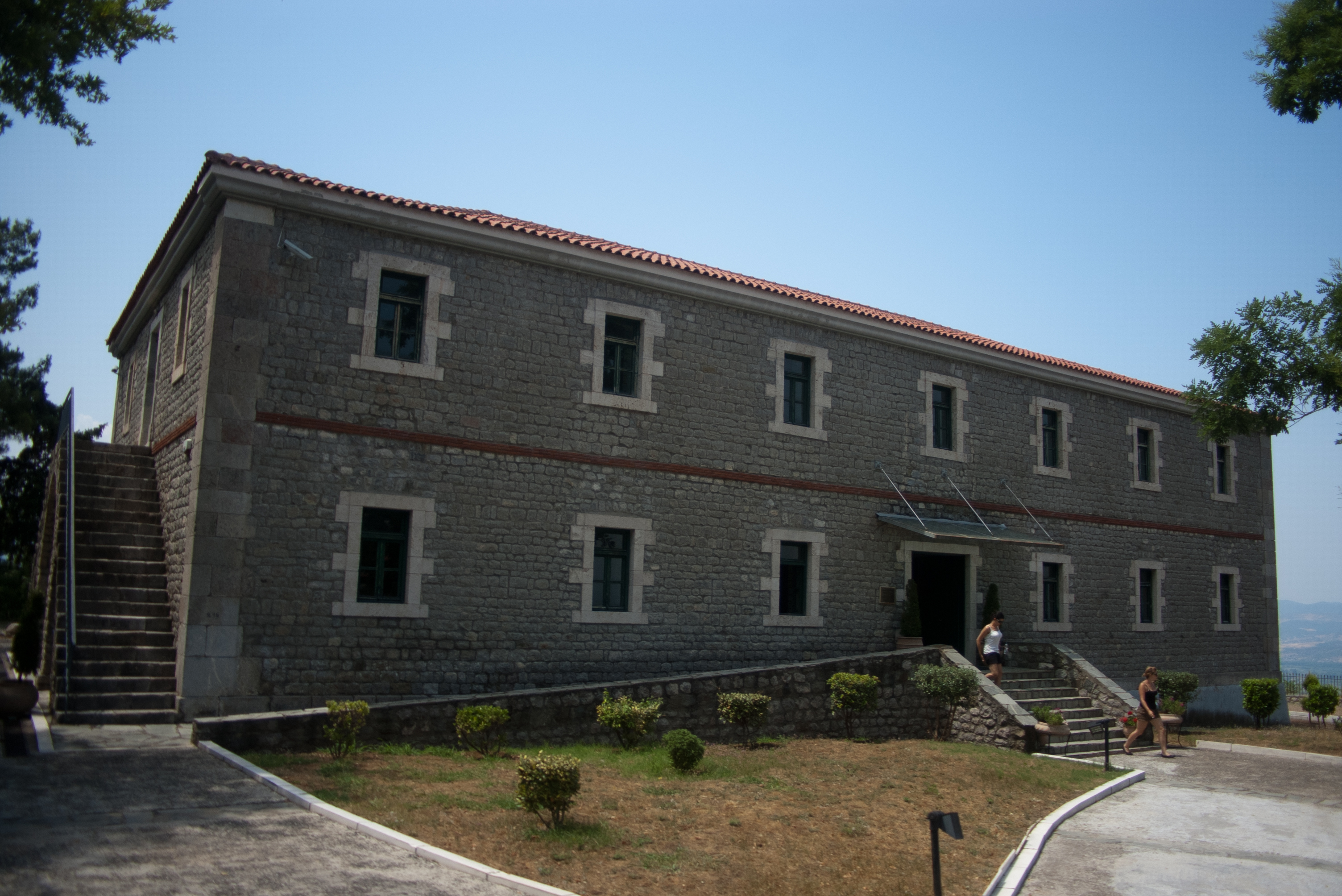
The museum building

The Byzantine Museum of Phthiotis (Greek: Βυζαντινό Μουσείο Φθιώτιδας) is a historical museum in the town of Ypati, Phthiotis Prefecture, Central Greece, focusing on the region's Byzantine-era history.

The museum is housed in a two-storey barracks building erected in 1836. Originally a frontier outpost, after the annexation of Thessaly in 1881 it was turned to other uses, including as a public school. Disused since the 1960s, the building had fallen into ruin, but after its repurposing as a museum was decided, it was completely restored in the 1990s. From 1997, the 7th Ephorate of Byzantine Antiquities began work on establishing the museum, initially in the ground floor, which was completed in 2004. Work on the first floor was aided by EU funds. The museum opened for the first time to the public in September 2005, and began regular function from 4 January 2007. Its official inauguration was on 18 March 2007.

The museum operates under the auspices of the 24th Ephorate of Byzantine Antiquities and features exhibits from across the region of Phthiotis, ranging from Early Christian times to the Ottoman period. The ground floor is dedicated to mosaics, with representative examples from Pelasgia, Achinos, and Loutra Ypatis; as well as an exhibition on the methods and materials used to make a mosaic. On the first floor is a list of the Byzantine monuments of the prefecture. The northern room hosts an exhibit on Early Christian church architecture, with architectural fragments from various basilicas, as well as items of daily use. The middle room hosts an exhibit of the region's numismatic history, as well as the private collection of Konstantinos Kotsilis, with coins ranging from Ancient Greece to Sassanid Persia and modern times. The southern hall features sculptures from local churches, such as the marble templon of the Church of the Taxiarchs from Agnanti.
