= Gaius Julius Verus Maximus =

Son of Roman Emperor Maximinus Thrax (died 238)

Maximus
- Caesar of the Roman Empire
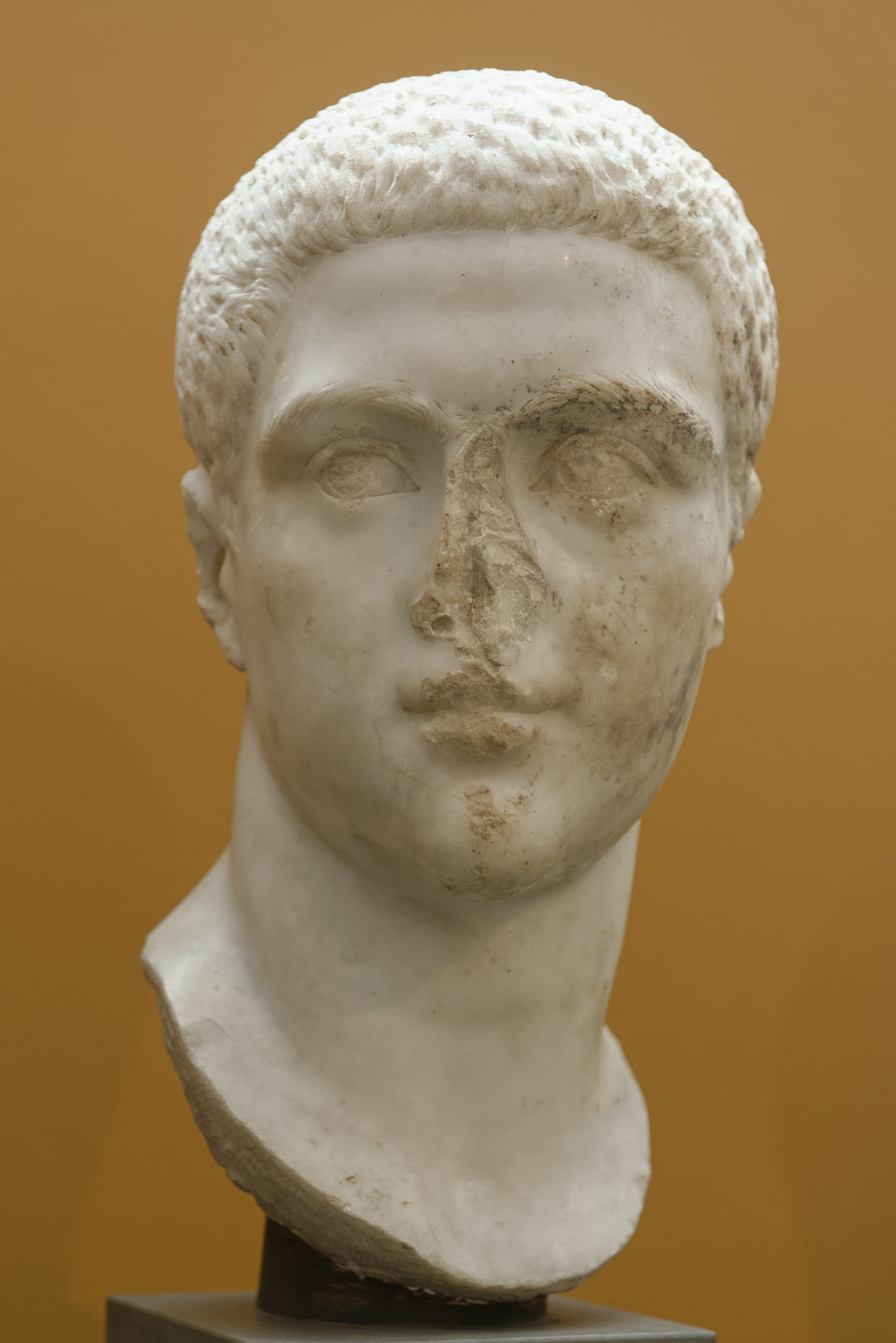
- Portrait of Maximus, son of emperor Maximinus Thrax (reign 235–238), defaced after he and his father were declared enemies of the State.
- Reign: 236 – May 238
- Born: 217/220
- Died: May 238 (aged 18–21)
Names
- Gaius Julius Verus Maximus
Regnal name
- Gaius Julius Verus Maximus Caesar
- Father: Maximinus Thrax
- Mother: Caecilia Paulina

Gaius Julius Verus Maximus (Note: He has also sometimes incorrectly been called Gaius Julius Verus Maximinus or Maximinus the Younger.) (217/220 – May 238) was the son of the Roman Emperor Maximinus Thrax and his wife, Caecilia Paulina. He was appointed Caesar by his father in 236, but held little real power.

The unreliable Historia Augusta claims that emperor Severus Alexander considered marrying his sister Theoclia to Maximus, but opted not to, because he believed his sister would not enjoy having a barbarian for a father-in-law.

Both Maximus and his father were murdered by the Praetorian Guard in May 238, during the Siege of Aquileia in the Year of the Six Emperors.
