= Bessarion (crater) =

Crater on the Moon

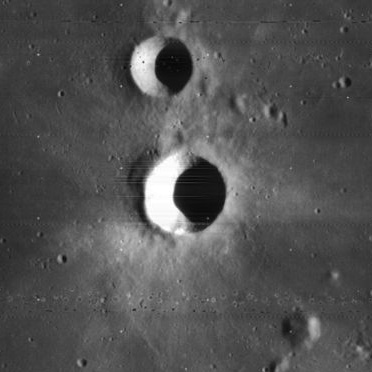
- Lunar Orbiter 4 image of Bessarion (center) and Bessarion E (top center)
- Coordinates: 14.9°N 37.3°W
- Diameter: 9.84 km (6.11 mi)
- Depth: 2.18 km (1.35 mi)
- Colongitude: 37° at sunrise
- Eponym: Bessarion

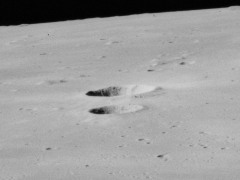
Oblique view from Apollo 15

Bessarion is a lunar impact crater located near the southwest edge of Mare Imbrium, on the Oceanus Procellarum. Some distance to the east is the crater T. Mayer. Bessarion is a bowl-shaped crater with a low central rise and a higher albedo than the surrounding maria, making it a brighter feature when the sun is overhead. The interior wall has dusky radial bands.

This crater is named after the learned Greek scholar Bessarion (1403-1472). The name was incorporated into lunar nomenclature by Italian astronomer Giovanni Riccioli in 1651. Its designation was formally adopted by the International Astronomical Union (IAU) in 1935. Just to the north of Bessarion is the smaller satellite crater Bessarion E that also has a relatively high albedo. This crater was called Virgil by Hugh Percy Wilkins and Patrick Moore. The name Virgil, for Bessarion E, is not officially recognized by the IAU.

== Bessarion and Bessarion E from full moon to last quarter moon ==
A bright white looking spot north of Kepler and southeast of Aristarchus, created by both bowl-shaped craters Bessarion and Bessarion E, is an eye catcher from full moon to last quarter moon. The brightness of Bessarion and Bessarion E is also noticeable on the photographic version of chart LAC 57 (page 114) in The Clementine Atlas of the Moon (Ben Bussey / Paul D. Spudis).

== Satellite craters ==
By convention these features are identified on lunar maps by placing the letter on the side of the crater midpoint that is closest to Bessarion.

Bessarion	Latitude	Longitude	Diameter
A	17.1° N	39.8° W	13 km
B	16.8° N	41.7° W	12 km
C	16.0° N	42.6° W	9 km
D	19.8° N	41.7° W	9 km
E	15.4° N	37.3° W	8 km
G	14.9° N	40.3° W	4 km
H	15.3° N	41.4° W	5 km
V	15.0° N	35.0° W	3 km
W	16.7° N	36.9° W	3 km
