= Quintus Tineius Clemens =

Late 2nd century Roman senator and consul

Quintus Tineius Clemens was a Roman senator. He was Consul Ordinarius in AD 195 with Publius Julius Scapula Tertullus Priscus.

He was the son of Quintus Tineius Sacerdos Clemens, consul in 158. His brothers were Quintus Tineius Rufus and Quintus Tineius Sacerdos.

== Family tree ==
Quintus Tineius Sacerdos Clemens consul ordinarius	Marcus Pupienus Maximus
Quintus Tineius Clemens consul ordinarius	Quintius Tineius Rufus consul 182	Quintus Tineius Sacerdos consul suffectus ∞ Volusia Laodice	Pupienus; Roman Emperor (238) ∞ Sextia Cethegilla	Marcus Ulpius Leurus senator
Tineia	Titus Clodius Pupienus Pulcher Maximus consul suffectus	Marcus Pupienus Africanus Maximus consul ordinarius ∞ Cornelia Marullina	Pupiena Sextia Paulina Cethegilla	Marcus Ulpius Eubiotus Leurus suffect consul
Lucius Clodius Tineius Pupienus Bassus proconsul ∞ Ovinia Paterna

Political offices
Preceded by Gaius Gabinius Barbarus Pompeianus, and ignotus as Suffect consuls	Consul of the Roman Empire; 195 with Publius Julius Scapula Tertullus Priscus	Succeeded by Gaius Domitius Dexter II, and Lucius Valerius Messalla Thrasea Priscus
