= Metropolis of Larissa and Tyrnavos =

The Metropolis of Larissa and Tyrnavos (Greek: Ιερά Μητρόπολις Λαρίσης και Τυρνάβου) is a Greek Orthodox metropolitan see in Thessaly, Greece.

== History ==
Christianity penetrated early to Larissa, though its first bishop is recorded only in 325 at the Council of Nicaea. Saint Achillius of Larissa, of the 4th century, is celebrated for numerous miracles.

Michel Le Quien cites twenty-nine bishops from the 4th to the 18th centuries.

In the Ecumenical Council of Ephesus in 431, the Bishop of Larissa is already mentioned as metropolitan bishop of Thessaly, and some of his suffragans who participated in the council were the bishops of Pharsalus, Lamia, Thessalian Thebes, Echinos, Hypate (Ypati), Kaisareia, and Demetrias. Some time between 730 and 751, the Church in Thessaly, along with the rest of the Illyricum, were transferred from the jurisdiction of the Pope in Rome to that of the Patriarch of Constantinople. Bishop Vigilantius attended the Council of Chalcedon.

In the middle Byzantine period, the Notitiae Episcopatuum show Larissa with ten suffragan sees; these were in order Demetrias, Pharsalus, Thaumakos, Zetouni (Lamia), Ezeros, Loidoriki, Trikke, Echinus, Kolydros, and Stagoi. Before the turn of the 10th century, Larissa also controlled Neopatras and the Spercheios valley, but sometime before 900 it was raised to a separate metropolis, while Pharsalus was likewise raised before 900 to the rank of an autonomous archbishopric. In ca. 1020, Stagoi was ceded for a time to the Archbishopric of Ohrid.

Subsequently, the number of suffragans increased and about the year 1175 under the Emperor Manuel I Comnenus, it reached twenty-eight.

Following the Fourth Crusade and Thessaly's incorporation into the Kingdom of Thessalonica, a Roman Catholic archbishop was installed in the place of the previous Greek Orthodox metropolitan. The city was soon recovered by the Greek Despotate of Epirus, however, possibly as early as 1212, and the Greek Orthodox metropolitan restored. At the close of the 15th century, under the Turkish domination, there were only ten suffragan sees, which gradually grew less and finally disappeared.

In 1881, Thessaly was ceded to Greece. In 1900, the see of Farsala and Platamon was united with Larissa, which became the Metropolis of Larissa and Platamon. Since the 1970s, the see has borne its current title.

== Known bishops ==
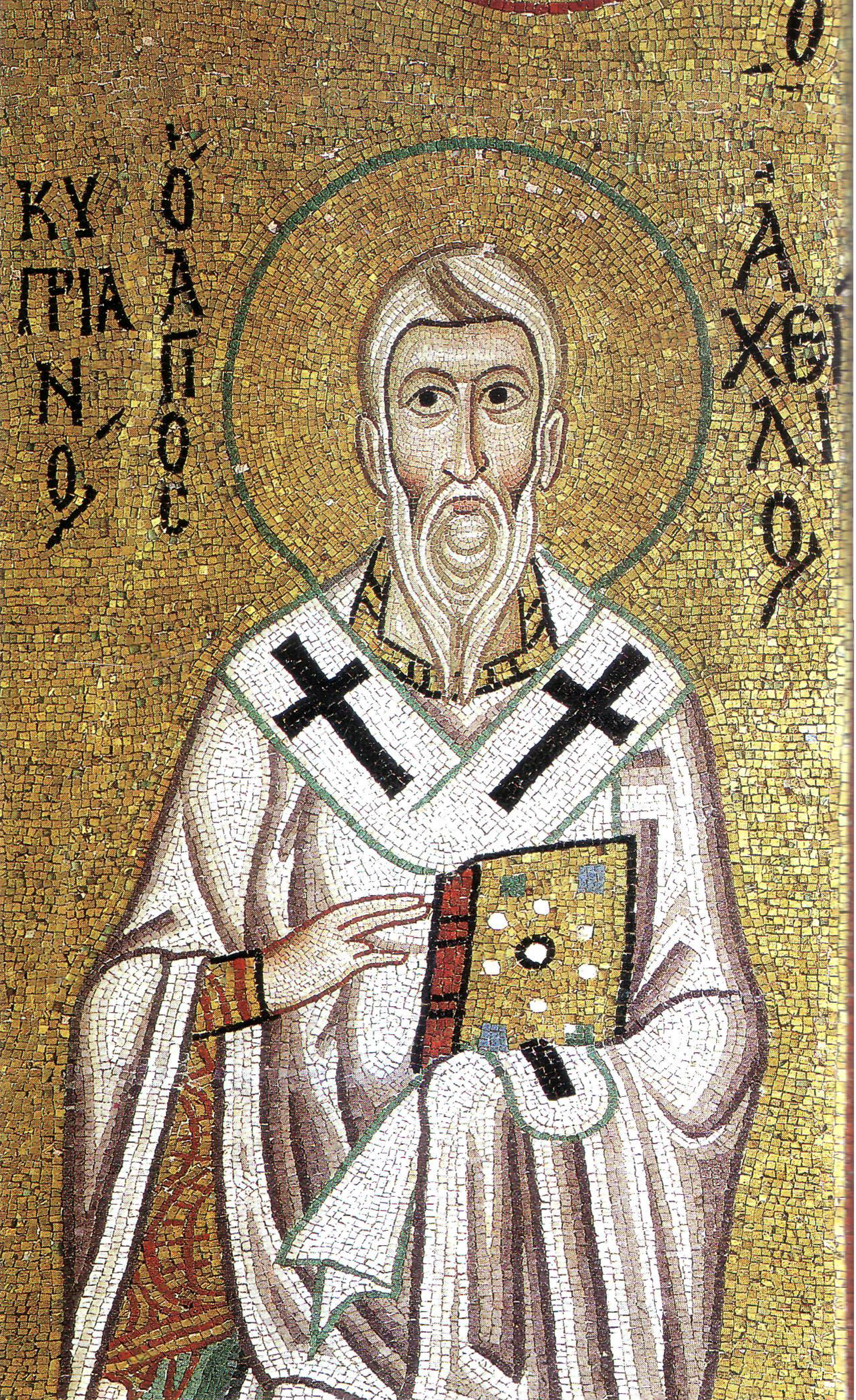
St. Achillius.

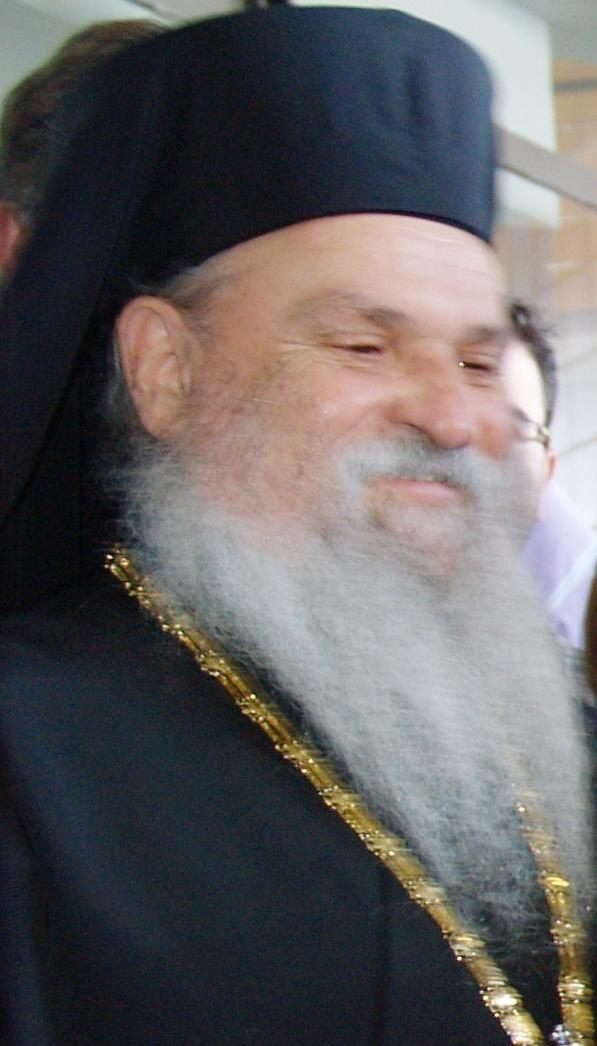
The late Metropolitan of Larisa, Ignatios.

- St. Achillius of Larissa, first archbishop and patron saint of Larisa c. 4th century
- Julian of Larissa, attended the Council of Ephesus.
- Jeremias II ?–733
- Thomas, Metropolitan of Larissa 1264
- Nikandros, Metropolitan of Larissa 1278–83
- Kyprianos, Metropolitan of Larissa 1318–?
- Antony, Metropolitan of Larissa 1340–62
- Neilos, Metropolitan of Larissa 1371–88
- Joasaph, Metropolitan of Larissa 1392/3
- St. Bessarion II, Bishop of Larissa 1526/7–40
- Neophytus II, Bishop of Larissa 1550–68
- Patriarch Jeremias II of Constantinople, Bishop of Larissa ca. 1568–72
- Patriarch Metrophanes III of Constantinople, Bishop of Larissa ca. 1572
- Dionysius the Philosopher, Bishop of Larissa 1592–1611
- Patriarch Paisius I of Constantinople, Bishop of Larissa ?–1652
- Patriarch Dionysius III of Constantinople, Bishop of Larissa 1652–62
- Patriarch Dionysius IV of Constantinople, Bishop of Larissa 1662–71
- Patriarch James of Constantinople, Bishop of Larissa ?–1679
- Iakovos II 1734–1749
- Patriarch Meletius II of Constantinople, Bishop of Larissa 1750–68
- Polykarpos Bithikoukis, Metropolitan of Larissa 1811–18
- Polykarpos Bithikoukis, Metropolitan of Larissa 1820–21
- St. Dionysios VII Kalliarchis, 1821
- Patriarch Anthimus IV of Constantinople, Bishop of Larissa 1835–37
- Patriarch Joachim IV of Constantinople, Bishop of Larissa 1870–75
- Archbishop Dorotheus of Athens, Bishop of Larissa and Tyrnavos 1935–56
- Demetrios Bekiaris 1989–91
- Ignatios Lappas 1994–June 26, 2018 (died in office)
- Hieronymus Nikolopoulos since 2018

== Sources ==
- Koder, Johannes; Hild, Friedrich (1976). Tabula Imperii Byzantini, Band 1: Hellas und Thessalia (in German). Vienna: Verlag der Österreichischen Akademie der Wissenschaften. ISBN 978-3-7001-0182-6.
- Nicol, Donald MacGillivray (2010). The Despotate of Epiros 1267–1479: A Contribution to the History of Greece in the Middle Ages. Cambridge University Press. ISBN 978-0-521-13089-9.
- Trapp, Erich; Beyer, Hans-Veit; Walther, Rainer; Sturm-Schnabl, Katja; Kislinger, Ewald; Leontiadis, Ioannis; Kaplaneres, Sokrates (1976–1996). Prosopographisches Lexikon der Palaiologenzeit (in German). Vienna: Verlag der Österreichischen Akademie der Wissenschaften. ISBN 3-7001-3003-1.
