= Quintus Tineius Rufus (consul 182) =

2nd century Roman senator and consul

Quintus Tineius Rufus was a Roman senator who was consul ordinarius in 182 with Marcus Petronius Sura Mamertinus as his consul prior. In 170 he was a member of the college of the Salii Palatini.

The son of Quintus Tineius Sacerdos Clemens, consul in 158, his brothers were Quintus Tineius Clemens and Quintus Tineius Sacerdos.

== Family tree ==
Quintus Tineius Sacerdos Clemens consul ordinarius	Marcus Pupienus Maximus
Quintus Tineius Clemens consul ordinarius	Quintius Tineius Rufus consul 182	Quintus Tineius Sacerdos consul suffectus ∞ Volusia Laodice	Pupienus; Roman Emperor (238) ∞ Sextia Cethegilla	Marcus Ulpius Leurus senator
Tineia	Titus Clodius Pupienus Pulcher Maximus consul suffectus	Marcus Pupienus Africanus Maximus consul ordinarius ∞ Cornelia Marullina	Pupiena Sextia Paulina Cethegilla	Marcus Ulpius Eubiotus Leurus suffect consul
Lucius Clodius Tineius Pupienus Bassus proconsul ∞ Ovinia Paterna

Political offices
Preceded by Commodus III, and Lucius Antistius Burrus	Consul of the Roman Empire; 182 with Marcus Petronius Sura Mamertinus	Succeeded by Commodus IV, and Gaius Aufidius Victorinus
