= Metropolis of Tricca, Gardiki and Pyli =

The Holy Metropolis of Tricca, Gardiki and Pyli (Greek: Ιερά Μητρόπολις Τρίκκης, Γαρδικίου και Πύλης), is a metropolis under the jurisdiction of the Church of Greece. The metropolis is centered on the cities of Trikala (ancient Tricca) and Kalabaka (medieval Stagoi) located in Thessaly, in central Greece.

Socrates Scholasticus, Sozomenes, and Nicephorus Callistus say that Heliodorus, probably the same as the author Heliodorus of Emesa, became Bishop of Tricca. Another bishop was Oecumenius, to whom have been wrongly attributed commentaries on the Acts of the Apostles, the Epistles of St. Paul and the Catholic Epistles (for the works published in his name are not his), and lived at the end of the sixth century. He was an Origenist and Monophysite who wrote a commentary on the Apocalypse. Some Latin titular bishops in the fifteenth and sixteenth centuries are also known.

Stagoi has been identified as a bishopric since at least the 10th century. In 1981, the Metropolis of Tricca and Stagoi was partitioned to form the Metropolis of Stagoi and Meteora while the see at Trikala retains the title of Tricca and Stagoi. In 2021 the title of the metropolis was modified to Metropolis of Tricca, Gardiki and Pyli.
