= List of presidents of the Royal Numismatic Society =

Logo of the Royal Numismatic Society

The following have served as presidents of the Royal Numismatic Society since its inception in 1836.

- 1836–39 John Lee
- 1839–41 Edward Hawkins
- 1841–43 H. H. Wilson
- 1843–45 Lord Albert Conyngham
- 1845–47 H. H. Wilson
- 1847–49 William Debonaire Haggard
- 1849–51 Edward Hawkins
- 1851–55 The Lord Londesborough (Formerly Lord Albert Conyngham, President 1843–45)
- 1855–74 W. S. W. Vaux
- 1874–1908 Sir John Evans
- 1908–14 Sir Henry Hoyle Howorth
- 1914–19 Sir Arthur Evans
- 1919–30 Sir Charles Oman
- 1930–35 Percy H. Webb
- 1935–36 Sir George MacDonald
- 1936–37 Percy H. Webb
- 1937–42 Edward A. Sydenham
- 1942–48 Harold Mattingly
- 1948–53 C. Humphrey V. Sutherland
- 1953–56 Michael Grant
- 1956–61 Christopher E. Blunt
- 1961–66 Philip Grierson
- 1966–70 Derek Allen
- 1970–74 Colin M. Kraay
- 1974–79 R. A. G. Carson
- 1979–84 David Grenville Sellwood
- 1984–89 John P. C. Kent
- 1989–94 T. V. Buttrey
- 1994–99 Michael Metcalf
- 1999–2004 Harold B. Mattingly
- 2005–2009 Joe Cribb
- 2009–2013 Nicholas Mayhew
- 2013–2018 Andrew Burnett
- 2018–2023 Roger Bland
- 2023- Martin Allen

== See also ==
- List of presidents of the British Numismatic Society
