= List of special publications of the Royal Numismatic Society =

This is a series of numismatic publications produced by the Royal Numismatic Society in addition to its annual journal, the Numismatic Chronicle.

== List of publications ==
- SP 1: James D.A. Thompson, Inventory of British Coin Hoards A.D. 600-1500 (1956), 165 pp., 24 plates.
- SP 2: G. Kenneth Jenkins and Richard W.B. Lewis, Carthaginian Gold and Electrum Coinage (1963), 140 pp., 38 plates.
- SP 3: John M.F. May (ed. Colin M. Kraay and G. Kenneth Jenkins), The Coinage of Abdera (540-345 B.C.) (1966), xi, 288 pp., 24 plates.
- SP 4: Michael H. Crawford, Roman Republican Coin Hoards (1969), vi, 170 pp., 3 plates.
- SP 5: C. Humphrey V. Sutherland, The Cistophori of Augustus (1970), xii, 134 pp., 36 plates.
- SP 6: I.D. Brown and Michael Dolley, Bibliography of Coin Hoards of Britain and Ireland (1971), 88 pp.
- SP 7: Roderick T. Williams, Silver Coinage of the Phokians (1972), x, 138 pp., 16 plates.
- SP 8: E.T. Hall and D. Michael Metcalf (eds), Methods of Chemical and Metallurgical Investigation of Ancient Coinage: A symposium held by the Royal Numismatic Society at Burlington House, London, 9–11 December 1970 (1972), viii, 448 pp., 20 plates.
- SP 9: Ulla Westermark and G. Kenneth Jenkins, The Coinage of Kamarina (1980), 283 pp., map, 40 plates.
- SP 10: Paul Z. Bedoukian, Coinage of the Artaxiads of Armenia (1978), xii, 81 pp., 8 plates.
- SP 11: D. Michael Metcalf, Coinage in South-Eastern Europe 820-1396 (1979), xxii, 371 pp., 8 plates.
- SP 12: Paul Balog, Coinage of the Ayyubids (1980), xiii, 334 pp., 50 plates. £10*
- SP 13: D. Michael Metcalf and W. Andrew Oddy (eds), Metallurgy in Numismatics, vol. 1 (1980), viii, 219 pp., 28 plates.
- SP 14: Nicholas J. Mayhew, Sterling Imitations of Edwardian Type (1983), xi, 271 pp., 45 plates.
- SP 15: D. Michael Metcalf, Coinage of the Crusades in the Latin East in the Ashmolean Museum Oxford (1st ed. 1983), x, 251 pp., 36 plates.
- SP 16: Philip Kinns, The Caprara Forgeries (1984), 59 pp., 8 plates.
- SP 17: Christopher J. Howgego, Greek Imperial Countermarks. Studies in the Provincial Coinage of the Roman Empire (1985), x, 317, pp., 36 maps, 32 plates.
- SP 18: Joan S. Martin, Index to Leonard Forrer’s Biographical Dictionary of Medallists (1987), viii, 312 pp.
- SP 19: W. Andrew Oddy (ed.), Metallurgy in Numismatics, vol. 2 (1988), ix, 132 pp., 11 plates.
- SP 20: Anne S. Robertson (ed. Richard Hobbs and Theodore V. Buttrey), An Inventory of Romano-British Coin Hoards (2000), 520 pp.
- SP 21: Nicholas G. Rhodes, Karl Gabrisch and Carlo Valdettaro, The Coinage of Nepal (1989), 250 pp., 1 map, 51 plates.
- SP 22: Paula Turner, Roman Coins from India (1989), 150 pp., 3 maps, 8 plates.
- SP 23: Marion M. Archibald and Michael R. Cowell, Metallurgy in Numismatics, vol. 3 (1993), xi, 250 pp., illus.
- SP 24: David J. MacDonald, The Coinage of Aphrodisias (1992), xi, 169, pp., 32 plates.
- SP 25: Roderick T. Williams, The Silver Coinage of Velia (1992), xi, 152 pp., 47 plates.
- SP 26: G.L. Duncan, Coin Circulation in the Balkan and Danubian Provinces, A.D. 294-578 (1993), 208 pp., 5 plates.
- SP 27.1: D. Michael Metcalf, Thrymsas and Sceattas in the Ashmolean Museum Oxford, vol. 1: Introduction, Thrymsas and Primary Sceattas (1993), 182 pp., 8 plates.
- SP 27.2: D. Michael Metcalf, Thrymsas and Sceattas in the Ashmolean Museum Oxford, vol. 2 (1993), 136 pp., 8 plates.
- SP 27.3: D. Michael Metcalf, Thrymsas and Sceattas in the Ashmolean Museum Oxford, vol. 3 (1994), pp. viii, 297-685, plates 17-28.
- SP 28: D. Michael Metcalf, Coinage of the Crusades in the Latin East in the Ashmolean Museum Oxford (2nd edition, 1995), xx, 366 pp., 48 plates.
- SP 29: Richard Ashton, Studies in Ancient Coinage from Turkey (1996), vii, 160 pp., 69 plates.
- SP 30: W. Andrew Oddy and Michael Cowell (eds), Metallurgy in Numismatics, vol. IV (1998), 538 pp., illustrations in text.
- SP 31: Nicholas J. Mayhew (ed.), The Gros Tournois (1997), 520 pp, 42 plates.
- SP 32: D. Michael Metcalf, An Atlas of Anglo-Saxon and Norman Coin Finds, c. 973-1086 (1998), 309 pp, 30 plates and maps.
- SP 33: Stanley Ireland, Greek, Roman and Byzantine Coins in the Museum at Amasya (ancient Amaseia), Turkey (2000), viii, 124 pp., map, 61 plates.
- SP 34: Kevin Butcher, Coinage in Roman Syria : Northern Syria, 64 BC – AD 253 (2004), xii, 534 pp., 32 plates.
- SP 35: See Coin Hoards, volume 9, Greek hoards.
- SP 36: Richard Abdy, Ian Leins and Jonathan Williams (eds), Coin Hoards from Roman Britain XI (2002), 233 pp., 10 plates.
- SP 37: David Hartill, Qing Cash (2003), xiii, 316 pp., 172 plates.
- SP 38: Yolanda C.S. Courtney, Public House Tokens in England and Wales c.1830-c.1920 (2004), xv, 226 pp., 23 plates.
- SP 39: Hodge Mehdi Malek, The Dabuyid Ispahbads and Early ‘Abbasid Governors of Tabaristan: History and Numismatics (2004), vii, 185 pp., 37 plates.
- SP 40: Kenneth A. Sheedy, The Archaic and Early Classical Coinages of the Cyclades (2006), viii, 261 pp., 20 plates.
- SP 41: Wilfred A. Seaby and Stanley A. Ireland, A Catalogue of Ancient Coins in the Cabinet of Sir Rodger Newdigate of Arbury Hall, Warwickshire: A Grand Tour Collection in the Warwickshire Museum (2005), v, 116 pp., 68 plates.
- SP 42: Jennifer A.W. Warren, The Bronze Coinage of the Achaian Koinon, the Currency of a Federal Ideal (2007), xvi, 212 pp., 39 plates.
- SP 43: Ann Johnston, Greek Imperial Denominations, ca 200-275: A study of the Roman Provincial Bronze Coinages of Asia Minor (2007), x, 294 pp., 26 plates.
- SP 44: John Casey, with Melih Arslan, Richard Brickstock and Julia Agnew, Sinope : A Catalogue of the Greek, Roman and Byzantine Coins in Sinop Museum (Turkey) and Related Historical and Numismatic Studies (2010), x, 158 pp., 32 plates.
- SP 45: Roger D. Penhallurick (ed. Peter Guest and Nick Wells), Ancient and Early Medieval Coins from Cornwall and Scilly (2009), viii, 312 pp.
- SP 46: Roger Bland and Xavier Loriot, Roman and Early Byzantine Gold Coins Found in Britain and Ireland (2010), xxviii, 372 pp., 22 plates.
- SP 47: Vesta Sarkhosh Curtis, M. Elahé Askari, Elizabeth J. Pendleton; with Richard Hodges, Ali-Akbar Safi, Sasanian Coins: A Sylloge of the Sasanian Coins in the National Museum of Iran (Muzeh Melli Iran), Tehran, Vol. 1: Ardashir I – Hormizd IV (2010), x, 102 pp., 102 plates.
- SP 48: Michael R. Broome (ed. Vlastimil Novák), A Survey of the Coinage of the Seljuqs of Rum (2011), xvi, 400 pp., 62 plates.
- SP 49: Vesta Sarkhosh Curtis, M. Elahe Askari, Elizabeth J. Pendleton, with Richard Hodges, Ali-Akbar Safi, Sasanian Coins: A Sylloge of the Sasanian Coins in the National Museum of Iran (Muzeh Melli Iran), Tehran, Vol. 2: Khusrau II – Yazdgard III (2012), x, 501 pp.
- SP 50: Jacqueline Morineau Humphris and Diana Delbridge, The Coinage of the Opountian Lokrians (2014), vii, 254 pp., 61 plates.
- SP 51: Robert Bennett, Local Elites and Local Coinage: Elite Self-Representation on the Provincial Coinage of Asia 31 BC – AD 275 (2014), xxiv, 178 pp., 31 plates.
- SP 53: Tony Goodwin and Rika Gyselen, Arab Byzantine Coins from the Irbid Hoard. Including a New Introduction to the Series and a Study of the Pseudo-Damascus Mint (2015), ix, 297 pp., 51 plates.
- SP 54: Susan Tyler-Smith, The Coinage Reforms (600-603) of Khusru II and the Revoly of Vistahm (2017), pp. xxiv, 292, 52 plates.
- SP 55: Hodge Mehdi Malek, Arab-Sasanian Numismatics and History during the Early Islamic Period in Iran and Iraq: The Johnson Collection of Arab-Sasanian Coins (2 vols), 832 pages including 130 plates; ISSN 0080-4487; ISBN 0 901405 94 9.
- SP 57: Clare Rowan, Mairi Gkikaki, and Antonino Crisà, Tokens: Culture, Connections, Communities (2019), pp. 248; ISBN 0 901405 35 3
- SP 58: Andrew Burnett, The Hidden Treasures of this Happy Island – A History of Numismatics in Britain from the Renaissance to the Enlightenment. 3 vols. (2020) Pp. xxxvi + 566 (vol. 1); xvi + 612 (vol. 2); xiv + 626 (vol 3), illus. ISBN 978-0901405364 Downloadable Supplement 1 (2024)
- SP 59: Jack Nurpetlian, Coinage in the Orontes Valley of Syria (1st century BC – 3rd century AD) (2020), 219 pp. ISBN 978-0901405388
