= Michael Grant (classicist) =

British classicist, numismatist, historian and author (1914-2004)

Michael Grant CBE
- Born: 21 November 1914; London, England
- Died: 4 October 2004 (aged 89); Tuscany, Italy

Academic background
- Education: Trinity College, Cambridge

Academic work
- Discipline: Classics
- Sub-discipline: Ancient Rome; numismatics; Roman coinage; early Christianity
- Institutions: University of Edinburgh; University of Khartoum; Queen's University Belfast

Michael Grant (21 November 1914 – 4 October 2004) was an English classicist, Professor of Humanity at the University of Edinburgh, numismatist, and author of numerous books on ancient history. His 1956 translation of Tacitus's Annals of Imperial Rome remains a standard of the work. Having studied and held a number of academic posts in the United Kingdom and the Middle East, he retired early to write full-time. He once described himself as "one of the very few freelancers in the field of ancient history: a rare phenomenon". As a populariser, his hallmarks were his prolific output and his unwillingness to oversimplify or talk down to his readership. He published over 70 works.

== Biography ==
Grant was born in London, the son of Col. Maurice Grant who served in the Boer War and later wrote part of its official history. Young Grant attended Harrow School and read classics (1933–37) at Trinity College, Cambridge. His speciality was academic numismatics. His research fellowship thesis later became his first published book – From Imperium to Auctoritas (1946), on Roman bronze coins. Over the next decade he wrote four books on Roman coinage; his view was that the tension between the eccentricity of the Roman emperors and the traditionalism of the Roman mint made coins (used as both propaganda and currency) a unique social record.

During World War II, Grant served for a year as an intelligence officer in London after which he was assigned (1940) as the UK's first British Council representative in Turkey. In this capacity he was instrumental in getting his friend, the eminent historian Steven Runciman, his position at Istanbul University. While in Turkey, he also married Anne-Sophie Beskow (they had two sons). At war's end, the couple returned to the UK with Grant's collection of almost 700 Roman coins (now in the Fitzwilliam Museum in Cambridge).

After a brief return to Cambridge, Grant applied for the vacant chair of Humanity (Latin) at Edinburgh University, which he held from 1948 until 1959. During a two-year (1956–58) leave of absence he also served as vice-chancellor (president) of the University of Khartoum – upon his departure, he turned the university over to the newly independent Sudanese government. He was then vice-chancellor of Queen's University of Belfast (1959–66), after which he pursued a career as a full-time writer. According to his obituary in The Times, he was "one of the few classical historians to win respect from [both] academics and a lay readership". Immensely prolific, he wrote and edited more than 70 books of nonfiction and translation, covering topics from Roman coinage and the eruption of Mount Vesuvius to the Gospels. He produced general surveys of ancient Greek, Roman and Israelite history as well as biographies of important figures such as Julius Caesar, Herod the Great, Cleopatra, Nero, Jesus, St. Peter and St. Paul.

As early as the 1950s, Grant's publishing success was somewhat controversial within the classicist community. According to The Times:

Grant's approach to classical history was beginning to divide critics. Numismatists felt that his academic work was beyond reproach, but some academics balked at his attempt to condense a survey of Roman literature into 300 pages, and felt (in the words of one reviewer) that "even the most learned and gifted of historians should observe a speed-limit". The academics would keep cavilling, but the public kept buying.

From 1966 until his death, Grant lived with his wife in Gattaiola (Lucca), a village near Lucca in Tuscany. His autobiography, My First Eighty Years, appeared in 1994.

== Degrees, honours and accolades ==
- Litt.D. (Cambridge)
- Hon. Litt. D. (Dublin)
- Hon. LL. D. (Queen's University, Belfast)
- Honorary Fellow, Royal Numismatic Society
- Medal of the Royal Numismatic Society, 1962
- President, Royal Numismatic Society
- Archer M. Huntington Medalist, American Numismatic Society
- OBE (1946)
- CBE (1958)

== Bibliography ==
=== Original works ===
==== 1940s ====
- From Imperium to Auctoritas: A Historical Study of Aes Coinage in the Roman Empire, 49 B.C.–A.D. 14 (1946), Cambridge University Press; rev. ed., (1971).

==== 1950s ====
- Aspects of the Principate of Tiberius: Historical Comments on the Colonial Coinage Issued Outside Spain (1950), New York: American Numismatic Society (Series: Numismatic Notes and Monographs, no. 116).
- Roman Anniversary Issues: An Exploratory Study of the Numismatic and Medallic Commemoration of Anniversary Years, 49 B.C. – A.D. 375. (1950), Cambridge University Press
- Ancient History (1952)
- The Six Main Aes Coinages of Augustus (1953), Edinburgh: University Press.
- Roman Literature (1954), Cambridge University Press; second edition (1958), Pelican Books; third edition (1964), Pelican Books.
- Roman Imperial Money (1954), Thomas Nelson & Sons, Ltd.
- Roman History from Coins (1958; Rev ed, 1968, Cambridge University Press)
- Greeks with Don Pottinger (1958), Thomas Nelson and Sons.

==== 1960s ====
- Romans with Don Pottinger (1960), Thomas Nelson and Sons; reprinted 1966.
- The World of Rome (1960; rev. eds., 19??/1974/1987) Weidenfeld & Nicolson 'History of Civilisation' series
- Report of the Commonwealth Conference on the Teaching of English as a Second Language (1961), Uganda Government Printer.
- The Ancient Mediterranean (1961; rev. ed., 1969)
- Myths of the Greeks and Romans (1962; new biblio: 1986 & 1995) ISBN 0-452-01162-0
- Greece and Rome: The Birth of Western Civilization (1964; rev. ed., 1986)
- The Civilizations of Europe (1965)
- Cambridge: A Living Tradition, introduction by Noel Annan (1966), Weidenfeld & Nicolson; (1966), Reynal & Co.; second edition (1976), Mowbrays; (1976) Alden Press; third edition (1988) Pevensey Press.
- The Gladiators (1967)
- The Climax of Rome: The Final Achievements of the Ancient World, AD 161–337 (1968; rev. eds., 19??/1974) Weidenfeld & Nicolson 'History of Civilisation' series
- Julius Caesar (1969)

==== 1970s ====
- The Ancient Historians (1970)
- The Roman Forum (1970; rev. ed., 1974)
- Nero (1970)
- Herod the Great (1971)
- Roman Myths (1971; rev. eds., 1972/1973)
- Cities of Vesuvius: Pompeii and Herculaneum (1971)
- Atlas of Classical History (1971; rev. eds., 1974/1986/1989/1994) [a.k.a. Ancient History Atlas]
- Cleopatra (1972; rev. ed., 1974), Weidenfeld & Nicolson
- The Jews in the Roman World (1973; rev. ed., 1984)
- Gods and Mortals in Classical Mythology, with John Hazel (1973), G. & C. Merriam Co; revised edition as Gods and Mortals in Classical Mythology: A Dictionary (1985), Dorset Press. French translation Le Who's who de la mythologie (1975), Editions Seghers. German translation Lexikon der antiken Mythen und Gestalten (1976), Deutscher Taschenbuch Verlag; reprinted 1980, 1986, 1996. Italian translation Dizionario della mitologica classica (1979), Sugarco Edizioni; reprinted 1986. Italian translation (1989), Club degli editori. Japanese translation Girishia Roma shinwa jiten (1998), Shohan. British edition reprinted as Routledge Who's Who in Classical Mythology (1993), Routledge; reprinted as Who's Who in Classical Mythology 2001, 2002, 2004, Routledge. Polish translation Kto jest kim w mitologii klasycyznej (2000), Zysk is-ka Wydawn.
- Caesar (1974), introduction by Elizabeth Longford.
- The Army of the Caesars (1974)
- Cities of Vesuvius: Pompeii and Herculaneum (1974)
- The Twelve Caesars (1975)
- Erotic Art in Pompeii: The Secret Collection of the National Museum of Naples (1975), London: Octopus Books Ltd; Photos by Antonia Mulas, Collection descriptions by Antonio De Simone and Maria Teresa Merella (Original publication in Italian, 1974)
- Saint Paul (1976) London: Weidenfeld & Nicolson ISBN 0-297-77082-9 New York: Charles Scribner's Sons ISBN 0-684-14682-7 Reprint: New York: Crossroad, 1982 ISBN 0-824-50434-8
- Jesus: An Historian's Review of the Gospels (1977) New York: Charles Scribner's Sons ISBN 0-684-14889-7 Reprint: 2004 ISBN 1-898-79988-1
- History of Rome (1978) ISBN 0-02-345610-8 ISBN 978-0-571-11461-0
- Greece and Italy in the Classical World (1978; rev. ed., 19??)
- The Art and Life of Pompeii and Herculaneum (1979)

==== 1980s ====
- The Etruscans (1980) Weidenfeld & Nicolson 'History of Civilisation' series
- Greek and Latin Authors: 800 BC – AD 1000 (1980)
- Dawn of the Middle Ages (1981)
- From Alexander to Cleopatra: the Hellenistic World (1982) [a.k.a. The Hellenistic Greeks (1990)]
- The History of Ancient Israel (1984) Weidenfeld & Nicolson 'History of Civilisation' series
- The Roman Emperors: A Biographical Guide to the Rulers of Imperial Rome 31 B.C. - A.D. 476 (1985), Charles Scribner's Sons.
- A Guide to the Ancient World: A Dictionary of Classical Place Names (1986), H. W. Wilson Co.; reprinted (1997) Barnes and Noble.
- The Rise of the Greeks (1987) Weidenfeld & Nicolson 'History of Civilisation' series
- The Classical Greeks (1989) Weidenfeld & Nicolson 'History of Civilisation' series

==== 1990s ====
- The Visible Past: Greek and Roman History from Archaeology, 1960–1990 (1990) [a.k.a. The Visible Past: An Archaeological Reinterpretation of Ancient History]
- The Fall of the Roman Empire. New York: Collier Books, Macmillan Publishing Company, 1990. ISBN 978-0-02-028560-1. Revised edition; first published 1976.
- Founders of the Western World: A History of Greece and Rome (1991) [a.k.a. A Short History of Classical Civilization]
- Greeks and Romans: A Social History (1992) [a.k.a. A Social History of Greece and Rome]
- The Emperor Constantine (1993) [a.k.a. Constantine the Great: The Man and His Times (1994)]
- The Antonines: The Roman Empire in Transition (1994)
- St Peter: A Biography (1994)
- My First Eighty Years (1994), Autobiography
- The Sayings of the Bible (1994), Duckworth Sayings Series
- Greek and Roman Historians: Information and Misinformation (1995)
- Art in the Roman Empire (1995)
- The Severans: The Changed Roman Empire (1996)
- From Rome to Byzantium: The Fifth Century (1998)
- Collapse and Recovery of the Roman Empire (1999; series: Routledge Key Guides)

==== 2000s ====
- Sick Caesars (2000)

=== Translations ===
- Tacitus, The Annals of Imperial Rome (1956), Penguin Books; reprinted 1959; second edition (1971), Penguin Books; reprinted 1971, 1975, 1977; third edition (1989), Penguin Books; revised bibliography, 1996. American edition (1956), Penguin USA; reprinted 1961, 1962, Penguin Books. Illustrated limited edition with preface by Theodore K. Rabb (2006), Folio Society.
- Cicero, Selected Works (1960), Penguin Books; reprinted 1962; second edition (1965), Penguin Books; reprinted 1967, 1969; third edition (1971), Penguin Books; reprinted 1974, 1975, 1976, 1977, 1979, 1981, 1982, 1984, 1986.
- Cicero, Selected Political Speeches (1969), Penguin Books; second edition (1973), Penguin Books; reprinted 1977, 1979, 1981, 1983, 1985.
- Cicero, Cicero on the Good Life (1971), Penguin Books; expanded edition with preface by A. C. Grayling (2003), Folio Society; reprinted 2003.
- Cicero, Murder Trials (1975), Penguin Books; reprinted 1986, Dorset Press.
- Cicero, The Joys of Farming (1980), Press in Tuscany Alley.
- Cicero, On Government (1993), Penguin Books.
- Tacitus, Nero and the Burning of Rome (1995), Penguin Books.

=== Editor/reviser ===
- Roman Readings (1958), Pelican Books; second edition (1967), Pelican Books; third edition, retitled Latin Literature: An Anthology (1979), Penguin Classics; reprinted with revised bibliography (1989), Penguin Books.
- Greek Literature in Translation (1973) [a.k.a. Greek Literature: An Anthology: Translations from Greek Prose and Poetry]
- Suetonius, The Twelve Caesars: An Illustrated Edition (1979; revision of Robert Graves' 1957 translation)
- Civilization of the Ancient Mediterranean (with R. Kitzinger, 1988)
- Apuleius, The Golden Ass (1990; revision of Robert Graves' 1950 translation)
- Readings in the Classical Historians (1992)

=== Contributor ===
- "Translating Latin Prose", ARIEL: A Review of International English Literature, Vol. 2, No. 2; April 1971. (Reprinted in Radice William and Barbara Reynolds (1987), The Translator's Art: Essays in Honor of Betty Radice, Harmondsworth: Penguin, pp 81–91.)
- Foreword (1993), In: Reprint of Liddell Hart, B.H., Scipio Africanus, Greater than Napoleon (1994), New York: Da Capo Press, pp v–xi.
- Entry, "Julius Caesar" [Review of the 1953 film], In: Carnes, Mark C., ed. (1995), Past Imperfect: History According to the Movies, New York: Henry Holt and Company (Series: A Society of American Historians Book), pp 44–47.

Academic offices
Preceded by Lord Ashby of Brandon	President and Vice-Chancellor of Queen's University Belfast; 1959–1966	Succeeded by Sir Arthur Vick
Professional and academic associations
Preceded by Humphrey Sutherland	President of the Royal Numismatic Society; 1953–1956	Succeeded by Christopher Blunt
