= Agnes Baldwin Brett =

American numismatist and archaeologist

- Born: September 25, 1876; Newark, New Jersey, U.S.
- Died: December 26, 1955 (aged 79); Marblehead, Massachusetts, U.S.
- Education: Barnard College and Columbia University
- Spouse: George Monroe Brett
- Children: Barbara Brett Sanders

Agnes Baldwin Brett (September 25, 1876 – December 26, 1955) was an American numismatist and archaeologist who worked as the Curator at the American Numismatic Society from 1910 to 1913. She was the first paid curator at the American Numismatic Society. She made important contributions to the study of ancient coinage, medals, and sculpture, whose work (particularly on coinage) was used by later archaeologists. Brett was also a visiting lecturer of archaeology at Columbia University in 1936.

== Biography ==
Brett grew up in Newark, New Jersey. She attended Barnard College and received her BA in 1897 and completed her MA at Columbia University in 1900. From 1900 Brett spent two years as a Fellow at the American School of Classical Studies at Athens. While in Athens, Brett worked on the coin finds from the American School of Classical Studies at Athens excavation at Corinth and published them in 1903. In 1910 Brett became the first female curator at the American Numismatic Society and remained closely connected with the institution until her death. She became an honorary Associate Curator of Ancient Coins from 1923 to 1955 and she also served as chair of the ANS Publications Committee from 1923 to 1946. Brett's correspondence and manuscripts are now housed in the American Numismatic Society's archives.

== Honors ==
=== Agnes Hoppin Memorial Fellowship ===
Brett was awarded the Agnes Hoppin Memorial Fellowship in 1901 during the second year of her fellowship at the American School of Classical Studies at Athens.

=== Medal of the Royal Numismatic Society ===
Brett was awarded the Medal of the Royal Numismatic Society in 1943. She was unable to attend the meeting to receive her medal and the Proceedings of the Royal Numismatic Society for 1943 describe how John Allan received the award on Brett's behalf and read an acceptance letter. The President of the Royal Numismatic Society, Harold Mattingly, noted that Brett was the second American (after Edward T. Newell), and the second female (after Helen Farquhar) to receive the Medal. Mattingly concluded his speech by noting

The award of the Medal marks our appreciation of distinguished services to numismatic studies - primarily, that and nothing else. As such I beg you to accept it. But I am sure that you will not mind, if the award to you in this fateful year of history, should be felt also to carry with it a greeting from our Society to a sister Society in your great and friendly nation.

— Harold Mattingly,

=== Huntington Medal Award of the American Numismatic Society ===
Brett was the second recipient of the ANS Huntington Medal in 1919.

== Collections ==
Brett collected Babylonian Cylinder seals and her collection was published in 1936 by the University of Chicago Oriental Institute.

There is a collection of photographs taken by Agnes Baldwin Brett at the American Numismatic Society from her travels between 1900 and 1909 through Bermuda, Greece, France, Italy, Turkey, and Great Britain. The photo archive was digitised and made available online by the American Numismatic Society in 2017.

== Family ==
Agnes Baldwin married George Monroe Brett in 1914 and had one daughter, Barbara Brett Sanders (5 March 1920 – 11 February 2013).

== Publications ==
=== Books ===
- Five Roman Gold Medallions, or, Multiple Solidi of the Late Empire, The American Numismatic Society: Numismatic Notes and Monographs, no. 6 (New York, 1921)
- Six Roman Bronze Medallions, The American Numismatic Society: Numismatic Notes and Monographs, no. 17 (New York, 1923)
- Four medallions from the Arras hoard, The American Numismatic Society: Numismatic Notes and Monographs, no. 28 (New York, 1926)
- Victory issues of Syracuse after 413 B.C., The American Numismatic Society: Numismatic Notes and Monographs, no. 75 (New York, 1936)
- Museum of Fine Arts, Boston: Catalogue of Greek coins, (Boston, 1955)

=== Articles ===
- "A bronze coin of Bithynia: The Lyre, Chelys", in Journal International d'Archeologie Numismatique 4 (1901) 67-76
- "The gold coinage of Lampsacus", in Journal International d'Archeologie Numismatique 5 (1902) 5-24
- "The cave at Vari. V. coins", in American Journal of Archaeology 7 (1903) 335-337
- "Facing heads on ancient Greek coins", in American Journal of Numismatics 43 no. 3 (August, 1909) 113-131
- "M. Godefroid Devreese", in American Journal of Numismatics 44, no. 2 (April, 1910) 61-63
- "The Virginia half-pennies", in The Numismatist 24, no. 8 (August, 1911) 276
- "Les monnaies de bronze dites incertaines du Pont ou du Royaume de Mithridate Eupator", in Revue Numismatique 4th ser., 17 (1913) 285-313
- "The electrum and silver coins of Chios, issued during the sixth, fifth, and fourth centuries, B.C.: A chronological study", in American Journal of Numismatics 48 (1914) 1-60
- "Symbolism on Greek coins", in American Journal of Numismatics 49 (1915) 89-194
- "An unedited gold stater of Lampsakos", in Zeitschrift für Numismatik 32 (1920) 1-14
- "The double sestertius of Trajan Decius", in The Numismatist 33, no. 6 (June, 1920) 277-279
- "A Roman gold bar from Egypt", in The Numismatist 33, no. 6 (June, 1920) 279-281
- "Lampsakos; the gold staters, silver and bronze coinages", in American Journal of Numismatics 53, pt. 3: (1924) 1-77
- "Un tresor monetaire decouvert a Cesaree en Cappadoce", in Arethuse 4 (1927) 145-172
- "Tetradrachms of Demetrius Poliorcertes", in Bulletin of the Museum of Fine Arts 28, no. 168 (1930) 71-72
- "Tetradrachm of Maussolus", in Bulletin of the Museum of Fine Arts 29, no. 171 (1931) 11-13
- "The aurei and solidi of the Arras hoard", in The Numismatic Chronicle 5th ser., 13 (1933) 268-348
- "The Aphlaston, symbol of naval victory or supremacy on Greek and Roman coins", in Transactions of the International Numismatic Congress (London, June 30-July 3, 1936) Ed. J. Allan, H. Mattingly, and E.S.G. Robinson (London, 1938) 23-32
- "A new Cleopatra tetradrachm of Ascalon", in American Journal of Archaeology 34, no. 3 (1937) 452-463
- "Philip of Macedon's race horse, winner at the Olympic Games, 356 B.C.", in Numismatic Review 1, no. 1 (June, 1943) 5-6
- "Seleucid coins of Ake-Ptolemais in Phoenicia", in ANS Museum Notes 1 (1946) 17-35
- "Dated coins of Ptolemy V, 204-180 B.C.", in ANS Museum Notes 2 (1947) 1-11
- "Indo-Bactrian coins acquired by the American Numismatic Society in 1947", in ANS Museum Notes 3 (1948) 31-43
- "The mint of Ascalon under the Seleucids", in ANS Museum Notes 4 (1950) 43-54
- "Athena Alkidemos of Pella", in ANS Museum Notes 4 (1950) 55-72
- "The Benha hoard of Ptolemaic gold coins", in ANS Museum Notes 5 (1952) 1-8
