= List of presidents of the British Numismatic Society =

The following have served as presidents of the British Numismatic Society since its inception in 1903.

#	From	To	President	Notes
1	1903	1908	P. W. P. Carlyon-Britton, DL, FSA	
2	1909	1909	W. J. Andrew, FSA	
3	1910	1914	P. W. P. Carlyon-Britton, DL, FSA	
4	1915	1919	Lt Col H. W. Morrieson, RA, FSA	
5	1920	1921	Frederick A. Walters, FSA	Scottish architect (1849-1931)
6	1922	1922 (until 22 June)	J. Sanford Saltus	
7	1922 (from 28 June>	1922	Grant Richardson Francis, FSA (1868-1940)	
8	1923	1925	Grant Richardson Francis, FSA	
9	1926	1927	Major W. J. Freer, VD, DL, FSA	
10	1928	1928 (until 20 February)	Major P. W. P. Carlyon-Britton, DL, FSA	
11	1928 (from 22 February)	1928	Lt Col H. W. Morrieson, RA, FSA	
12	1929	1932	Lt Col H. W. Morrieson, RA, FSA	
13	1933	1937	Vernon Bryan Crowther-Beynon, MBE, MA, FSA (1865-1941)	
14	1938	1945	Herbert William Taffs, MBE	
15	1946	1950	C. E. Blunt, OBE, FSA	
16	1951	1954	Edgar Joseph Winstanley, LDS	
17	1955	1963	Horace Herbert King, MA (1890-1976)	
18	1959	1963	Derek F. Allen, BA, FBA, FSA (1910–1975)	
19	1964	1965	Charles Wilson Peck, FPS, FSA	pharmacist, (1901-1968)
20	1966	1970	Colin Stewart Sinclair Lyon, MA, FIA	
21	1971	1975	Stuart Eborall Rigold, MA, FSA (1919-1980)	
22	1976	1980	Peter Woodhead, FSA	
23	1981	1983	John David Brand, MA, FCA (1931-1990)	
24	1984	1988	Hugh E. Pagan, MA, FSA	
25	1989	1993	Christopher Edgar Challis, BA, PhD, FSA, FR Hist S	
26	1994	1998	Graham P. Dyer, BSc (Econ), DGA	librarian and museum curator at The Royal Mint
27	1999	2003	David W Dykes, MA, PhD, FSA, FR Hist S	director of the National Museum of Wales
28	2004	2008	M. A. S. Blackburn, MA, PhD, FSA, FRHistS	
29	2008	2012	Robin John Eaglen, MA, LLM, PhD, FSA	
30	2012	2016	Professor Roger Bland, MA, PhD, FSA	
31	2017	2023	Kevin Clancy	
32	2023	incumbent	Elina Screen	first female president

== See also ==
- List of presidents of the Royal Numismatic Society
