= Marion Archibald =

British numismatist

- Born: 1935
- Died: 23 April 2016 (aged 80–81)
- Occupations: numismatist, author
- Employer: British Museum

Marion MacCallum Archibald (1935 – 23 April 2016) was a British numismatist, author and for 33 years a curator at the British Museum. She was the first woman to be appointed Assistant Keeper in the Department of Coins and Medals and is regarded as a pioneer in what had previously been a male-dominated field. Her 70th birthday was celebrated with the publication of a book of essays authored by 30 of her colleagues, collaborators and former students for whom Marion's name was "synonymous ... with the study of Anglo-Saxon coins at the British Museum".

== Biography ==
Marion Archibald was born in 1935. She started her numismatic career at the Birmingham City Museum in 1958.

She joined the Department of Coins and Medals at the British Museum in 1963, and was appointed Assistant Keeper in 1965; she retired from her post in 1997.

Beyond the immediate study of Anglo-Saxon coins and monetary systems, her interests extended to dies, coin weights, trial pieces and lead strikings, and coin jewellery. She worked to advance the scientific analysis of coins, and as a member of the Royal Numismatic Society's scientific committee organised a conference on, and co-wrote a text, on the application of metallurgy in numismatics. Her responsibilities at the museum extended to fielding treasure trove finds, whether coin hoards, excavation coins or single-finds; these gave her ample subject-matter for a substantial output of articles, notes and reports. She was a pioneer in the systematic recording of finds, as well as the application of an understanding of coin circulation histories on the dating of excavations; more generally, she worked to integrate numismatic and monetary system studies with archaeology and historical research. She was reputed a superb lecturer.

Throughout her career Archibald worked as an officer and council member of the Royal Numismatic Society and the British Numismatic Society, both electing her Honorary Fellow, the former in 1996. She was elected Fellow of the Society of Antiquaries of London in 1974. She held the post of president of the British Association of Numismatic Societies from 1986 to 1991; each year it sponsors a Marion Archibald Memorial Lecture at its annual conference. Her work was widely recognised, and she was awarded the Sanford Saltus Gold Medal of the British Numismatic Society in 1980, the Jeton de Vermeil of the French Numismatic Society in 1988, and the Medal of the Royal Numismatic Society in 2011. She continued to write after retiring from the British Museum.

Archibald was the secretary of the Royal Numismatic Society Scientific Research Committee from its inception in 1976 until 1997. During this time three volumes of Metallurgy in Numismatics were published by the Society (MIN 1 in 1980, MIN 2 in 1988, MIN 3 in 1993), Archibald co-editing the third volume with MR Cowell. The fourth volume (MIN 4 1998) included a dedication to Archibald highlighting her work as secretary, her editorship of MIN 3, and her work in organising the symposia which formed the basis for the MIN series.

Archibald's 70th birthday year was celebrated with the publication of a book of essays, Coinage and History in the North Sea World, c. AD 500-1250 integrating an understanding of numismatics, monetary studies, archaeology and history, with papers from 30 of her colleagues, collaborators and former students. She died ten years later on 23 April 2016.

== Publications and exhibitions ==
Marion Archibald, with co-authors, published three books; some 21 long articles and book chapters, and very many short articles, notes, and archaeological reports. She also contributed to the organisation and production of catalogues for five exhibitions.

=== Books ===
- Archibald, M M; Blunt, C E (1986). British Museum, Anglo-Saxon Coins V. Athelstan to the reform of Edgar, 924-c.973. Sylloge of Coins of the British Isles. London: Trustees of the British Museum.
- Archibald, M M; Cowell, M (1993). Metallurgy in Numismatics 3. Royal Numismatic Society Special Publication. London: Royal Numismatic Society.
- Archibald, M M; Cook, B J (2001). English Medieval Coin Hoards I. Cross and Crosslets, Short Cross and Long Cross Hoards. British Museum Occasional Papers. London: British Museum.

=== Exhibitions ===
- The Vikings (1980)
- English Romanesque Art 1066-1200 (1984)
- The Golden Age of Anglo-Saxon Art 966-1066 (1984)
- The Making of England (1991)
- Heirs of Rome: the shaping of Britain AD 400-900 (1997)
