= Anne Strachan Robertson =

Scottish archaeologist, numismatist, curator and professor

Anne Strachan Robertson DLitt FSA FSAScot FRSE FMA FRNS
- Born: 3 May 1910; Glasgow, Scotland
- Died: 4 October 1997 (aged 87)
- Education: University of Glasgow; University of London
- Awards: Cowan Medal; Medal of the Royal Numismatic Society (1964); Huntington Medal, American Numismatic Society (1970)
- Scientific career
- Fields: archaeology, numismatics
- Workplaces: University of Glasgow; Hunterian Museum

Anne Strachan Robertson FSA FSAScot FRSE FMA FRNS (3 May 1910 – 4 October 1997) was a Scottish archaeologist, numismatist and writer, who was Professor of Roman Archaeology at the University of Glasgow and Keeper of the Cultural Collections and of the Hunterian Coin Cabinet at the Hunterian Museum. She was recognised by her research regarding Roman Imperial coins and as "a living link with the pioneers of archaeological research".

== Early life and education ==
Anne Strachan Robertson was born in Glasgow on 3 May 1910. Her parents, Margaret Purden and John Anderson Robertson, were both school teachers.

She was educated in Glasgow at Hillhead High School and the Glasgow High School for Girls. In 1928 she attended the University of Glasgow, where she was impressed by the work and teachings of S.N. Miller relating to Roman history. In 1930 Robertson won the Cowan Medal and she obtained the approval of Sir George Macdonald, then Honorary Keeper of the Hunterian Coin Cabinet. After graduating with a Master of Arts with Honours in Classics in 1932, she started her studies for a second MA, this time in archaeology, at the University of London.

In London, she obtained different scholarships to participate in Mortimer Wheeler's excavations, to work at the Coin Room of the British Museum, and to several academic papers on numismatics. She graduated in 1934, having acquired considerable experience in archaeological methods, particularly as result of her participation in Wheeler's excavation of Maiden Castle.

== Career ==
Robertson returned to Glasgow in 1936 when she was appointed Dalrymple Lecturer in Archaeology. In 1938, she joined the staff of the University of Glasgow involved in the curation of the Hunterian Museum and Art Gallery. In 1952 she became Under (Deputy) Keeper of the Museum. In 1964 she was appointed keeper of cultural collections, and was promoted to reader in archaeology at the university in the same year. In 1974 she was given the honorary title of Professor and became the Keeper of Roman Archaeology at the museum.

She was president of the Glasgow Archaeological Society from 1954 to 1957, having been vice-president from 1945 to 1954. Following her presidency, Robertson served as honorary secretary of the society from 1965 to 1972. A special issue of the Glasgow Archaeological Journal was published in her honour in 1976 "in gratitude for her outstanding services to scholarship - specifically, to the study of Roman Scotland - and to the Glasgow Archaeological Society".

She served on the council of the Society of Antiquaries of Scotland from 1946, and was the first woman to be elected to council.

Robertson was a prolific excavator of Roman sites, notably Castledykes near Lanark (1937), Duntocher on the Antonine Wall (1947–51), Birrens in Dumfriesshire (1962-7), and Cardean in Angus (1968–75). She was Secretary of the Scottish Field School of Archaeology from 1948 to 1973.

== Honours ==
Robertson became a Fellow of the Royal Numismatic Society in 1937, and the Society of Antiquaries of Scotland in 1941.

Robertson was elected as a Fellow of the Society of Antiquaries of London in 1958. Robertson was elected as a Fellow of the Royal Society of Edinburgh in 1975 (FRSE). Her proposers were Alex Haddow, Robert Alexander Rankin, Stuart Piggott, Sheina Marshall, Edward McGirr and Agnes Miller. She was elected to an Honorary Membership of the Glasgow Archaeological Society in 1976.

In 1964, she was awarded the Medal of the Royal Numismatic Society, followed by the Huntington Medal from the American Numismatic Society in 1970.

== Publications ==
=== Books ===
- An Antonine Fort: Golden Hill, Duntocher (Edinburgh, 1957)
- The Antonine Wall: A Handbook to the Roman Wall between Forth and Clyde and a Guide to its Surviving Remains (Glasgow, 1960; 5th edn., rev. and ed. by L. Keppie, 2001)
- The Roman Imperial Coins in the Hunter Coin Cabinet, University of Glasgow, 5 vols. (1962-1982)
- The Roman Fort at Castledykes, (Edinburgh, 1964)
- Birrens (Blatobulgium) (Edinburgh, 1975)
- (with M. Scott and L. Keppie), Bar Hill: A Roman Fort and its Finds, (Oxford,1975)
- An Inventory of Romano-British Coin Hoards, Royal Numismatic Society Special Publication 20 (2000).

=== Articles ===
A bibliography of Anne Robertson's published work to 1976 was compiled for a special issue of the Glasgow Archaeological Journal in 1976 (volume 4, issue 4)

Keppie, L (1976) 'Anne S Robertson: A bibliography of her published work to 1976', Glasgow Archaeological Journal vol 4, issue 4 (1976), pp. 144–6. https://doi.org/10.3366/gas.1976.4.4.144

- (with J Smythe) 'A Roman oven at Mumrills, Falkirk', Proceedings of the Society of Antiquaries of Scotland 76 (1942), pp. 119–27. https://doi.org/10.9750/PSAS.076.119.127
- 'A Hoard of Roman Silver Coins from Briglands, Rumbling Bridge, Kinross-shire', Proceedings of the Society of Antiquaries of Scotland 90 (1957), pp. 241–6. https://doi.org/10.9750/PSAS.090.241.246
- 'Roman Coins found in Scotland, 1951-60', Proceedings of the Society of Antiquaries of Scotland 94 (1961), pp. 133–83. https://doi.org/10.9750/PSAS.094.133.183
- 'Recent work on the Antonine Wall', Glasgow Archaeological Journal vol 1, issue 1 (1969), pp. 37–42. https://doi.org/10.3366/gas.1969.1.1.37
- 'The Roman Camp(s) on Hillside Farm, Dunblane, Perthshire', Glasgow Archaeological Journal vol 1, issue 1 (1969), pp. np-36. https://doi.org/10.3366/gas.1969.1.1.NP
- 'The Renfrew (1963) Coin Hoard', Glasgow Archaeological Journal vol 1, issue 1 (1969), pp. 72–4. https://doi.org/10.3366/gas.1969.1.1.72
- 'Distance Slab of the Twentieth Legion found on the Antonine Wall, at Hutcheson Hill, 1969', Glasgow Archaeological Journal vol 1, issue 1 (1969), p. 1. https://doi.org/10.3366/gas.1969.1.1.1
- 'Roman coins found in Scotland, 1961-70', Proceedings of the Society of Antiquaries of Scotland 103 (1971), pp. 113–68. https://doi.org/10.9750/PSAS.103.113.168
- (with Ethel Barlow) 'The Dun Lagaidh hoard of short cross sterlings', Glasgow Archaeological Journal vol 3, issue 3 (1974), pp. 78–81. https://doi.org/10.3366/gas.1974.3.3.78
- 'Roman Finds from Non-Roman Sites in Scotland’, Britannia, vol. I (1970), pp. 198–226.
- ‘The Romans in North Britain: The Coin Evidence', in Aufstieg und Niedergang der römischen Welt, pt. 2, vol. 3 (Berlin, 1975), pp. 364–428.
- 'Roman coins found in Scotland, 1971-1982', Proceedings of the Society of Antiquaries of Scotland 113 (1984), pp. 405–48. https://doi.org/10.9750/PSAS.113.405.448
