= Sylloge of Coins of the British Isles =

The Sylloge of the Coins of the British Isles (SCBI) is an ongoing project to publish all major museum collections and certain important private collections of British coins. Catalogues in the series contain full details and illustrations of each and every specimen. Every Anglo-Saxon and Norman coin included in the project can be viewed on the SCBI Database, based at the Department of Coins and Medals, Fitzwilliam Museum, Cambridge.

== History ==
The project was first suggested in the early 1950s by Christopher Blunt and other members of the British and Royal Numismatic Societies. In 1956, its unofficial committee secured recognition as a committee of the British Academy through the good offices of its first chairman, Sir Frank Stenton. The first volume, on Anglo-Saxon Coins in the Fitzwilliam Museum, Cambridge (prepared by Philip Grierson), was published two years later in 1958.

Since that date over sixty additional volumes have been published, covering both museum and some significant private collections in Britain, the United States, Germany, Russia, Sweden, Denmark, Finland, Poland, Latvia and more. Further volumes are in preparation or projected for the future. The key gaps in the series remain the British Museum and the Royal Coin Collection in Stockholm. Both of these present massive undertakings and have only recently begun to be tackled comprehensively. Some of the early volumes, such as that covering the Cambridge collection, are also now in need of substantial updating. Nonetheless, British numismatics has been extremely well served by the project, and it continues to publish volumes almost every year.

== Committee ==
Since its inception, the policy of the Sylloge Project has been to keep an eminent Anglo-Saxon historian as its chairman. This reflects the emphasis on Anglo-Saxon material in the published volumes, and the need to keep an educated outside perspective on the project. Chairmen have included:

- Sir Frank Stenton, FBA (1956–1966)
- Professor Dorothy Whitelock, CBE, FBA (1966–1979)
- Professor H. R. Loyn, FBA (1979–1993)
- The Rt Hon. Lord Stewartby, FBA, FRSE (1993–2003)
- Professor S. D. Keynes, FBA (2003–)

General Editors of the project have included:

- Christopher Blunt, OBE, FBA (1956–1987)
- Professor R. H. M. Dolley, MRIA (1956–1983)
- Dr M. A. S. Blackburn (1980–2011)

Other current members of the Sylloge Committee are:

- Dr B. J. Cook
- C. S. S. Lyon
- Dr R. G. R. Naismith
- H. E. Pagan
- Dr V. Smart
- Professor P. Spufford, FBA

== Volumes ==
Current volumes of the Sylloge are:

- 1. FITZWILLIAM MUSEUM, CAMBRIDGE.

Ancient British and Anglo-Saxon Coins. By P. Grierson. 32 plates, 1958.

- 2. HUNTERIAN MUSEUM, GLASGOW.

Anglo-Saxon Coins. By A.S. Robertson. 42 plates, 1961.

- 3. COINS OF THE CORITANI.

By D.F. Allen. 8 plates, 1963.

- 4. ROYAL COLLECTION, COPENHAGEN.

Part I. Ancient British and Anglo-Saxon Coins. By G. Galster. 30 plates, 1964.

- 5. GROSVENOR MUSEUM, CHESTER.

Coins with the Chester Mint-Signature. By E.J.E. Pirie. 16 plates, 1964.

- 6. NATIONAL MUSEUM OF ANTIQUITIES OF SCOTLAND, EDINBURGH.

Anglo-Saxon Coins. By R.B.K. Stevenson. 29 plates, 1966.

- 7. ROYAL COLLECTION, COPENHAGEN.

Part II. Anglo-Saxon Coins: Æthelred II. By G. Galster. 71 plates, 1966. (Published jointly with the Carlsberg Foundation)

- 8. BRITISH MUSEUM.

Hiberno-Norse Coins. By R.H.M. Dolley. 8 plates, 1966. (Published by the trustees of the British Museum)

- 9. ASHMOLEAN MUSEUM, OXFORD.

Part I. Anglo-Saxon Pennies. By J.D.A. Thompson. 42 plates, 1967.

- 10. ULSTER MUSEUM, BELFAST.

Part I. Anglo-Irish Coins, John - Edward III. By M. Dolley and W. Seaby. 20 plates, 1968. (Published jointly with the trustees of the Ulster Museum)

- 11. READING UNIVERSITY.

Anglo-Saxon and Norman Coins; ROYAL COIN CABINET, STOCKHOLM. [Part VI.] Anglo-Norman Pennies. By C.E. Blunt and M. Dolley. 20 plates, 1969. (Published jointly with the Swedish Royal Academy)

- 12. ASHMOLEAN MUSEUM, OXFORD.

Part II. English Coins 1066–1279. By D.M. Metcalf. 36 plates, 1969.

- 13-15. ROYAL COLLECTION, COPENHAGEN.

Part III. A, B, and C. Anglo-Saxon Coins: Cnut. By G. Galster. 158 plates, 1970. (3 vols.) (Published jointly with the Carlsberg Foundation)

- 16. NORWEB COLLECTION.

Ancient British and English Coins to 1180. By C.E. Blunt, F. Elmore-Jones and R.P. Mack. 17 plates, 1971. (Published by Spink & Son Limited)

- 17. MIDLAND MUSEUMS.

Ancient British, Anglo-Saxon and Norman Coins. By A.J.H. Gunstone. 30 plates, 1971.

- 18. ROYAL COLLECTION, COPENHAGEN.

Part IV. Anglo-Saxon Coins from Harold I and Anglo-Norman Coins. By G. Galster. 54 plates, 1972. (Published jointly with the Carlsberg Foundation)

- 19. BRISTOL AND GLOUCESTER MUSEUMS.

Ancient British Coins and Coins of the Bristol and Gloucestershire Mints. By L.V. Grinsell, C.E. Blunt and M. Dolley. 27 plates, 1972.

- 20. MACK COLLECTION.

Ancient British, Anglo-Saxon and Norman Coins. By R.P. Mack. 56 plates, 1973.

- 21. YORKSHIRE COLLECTIONS.

Coins from Northumbrian mints, c.895-1279; Ancient British and Later Coins from Other Mints to 1279. By E.J.E. Pirie. 54 plates, 1975.

- 22. ROYAL COLLECTION, COPENHAGEN.

Part V. Hiberno-Norse and Anglo-Irish Coins. By G. Galster with M. Dolley and J. Steen Jensen. 22 plates, 1975.

- 23. ASHMOLEAN MUSEUM, OXFORD.

Part III. Coins of Henry VII. By D.M. Metcalf. 53 plates, 1976.

- 24. WEST COUNTRY MUSEUMS.

Ancient British, Anglo-Saxon and Anglo-Norman Coins. By A.J.H. Gunstone. 30 plates, 1977.

- 25. NATIONAL MUSEUM, HELSINKI.

Anglo-Saxon and Anglo-Norman Coins. By T. Talvio. 41 plates, 1978.

- 26. MUSEUMS IN EAST ANGLIA.

Morley St Peter Hoard, and Anglo-Saxon, Norman, and Angevin Coins, and Later Coins of the Norwich Mint. By T.H.McK. Clough. 52 plates, 1980.

- 27. LINCOLNSHIRE COLLECTIONS.

Coins from Lincolnshire mints, and Ancient British and Later Coins to 1272. By A.J.H. Gunstone. 68 plates, 1981.

- 28. CUMULATIVE INDEX OF VOLS. 1-20.

By V. Smart. 1981.

- 29. MERSEYSIDE COUNTY MUSEUMS.

Ancient British and Later Coins to 1279. By M. Warhurst. 39 plates, 1982.

- 30. AMERICAN COLLECTIONS.

Ancient British, Anglo-Saxon and Norman Coins. By J.D. Brady. 30 plates, 1982.

- 31. NORWEB COLLECTION.

Tokens of the British Isles 1575–1750. Part I. Bedfordshire to Devon. By R.H. Thompson. 35 plates, 1984. (Published by Spink & Son Limited)

- 32. ULSTER MUSEUM, BELFAST.

Part II. Hiberno-Norse Coins. By W. Seaby. 16 plates, 1984. (Published jointly with the trustees of the Ulster Museum)

- 33. BROOKER COLLECTION.

Coins of Charles I. By J.J. North and P.J. Preston-Morley. 130 plates, 1984. (Published by Spink & Son Limited)

- 34. BRITISH MUSEUM.

Anglo-Saxon Coins, Part V: Athelstan to Edgar's Reform. By M.M. Archibald and C.E. Blunt. 56 plates, 1986. (Published by the trustees of the British Museum)

- 35. ASHMOLEAN AND HUNTERIAN MUSEUMS.

Scottish Coins. By J.D. Bateson and N.J. Mayhew. 116 plates, 1987.

- 36. STATE MUSEUM, BERLIN.

Anglo-Saxon, Anglo-Norman, and Hiberno-Norse Coins. By B. Kluge. 41 plates, 1987. (Published jointly with the State Museum, Berlin)

- 37. POLISH MUSEUMS.

Anglo-Saxon and Later Medieval British Coins. By A. Mikolajczyk. 20 plates, 1987. (Published jointly with the Archaeological and Ethnographical Museum in Lódz)

- 38. NORWEB COLLECTION.

Tokens of the British Isles 1575–1750. Part II. Dorset to Gloucestershire. By R.H. Thompson. 41 plates, 1988. (Published by Spink & Son Limited)

- 39. NORTH COLLECTION.

Edwardian English Silver Coins, 1279–1351. By J.J. North. 46 plates, 1989.

- 40. ROYAL COIN CABINET, STOCKHOLM.

Part IV. Anglo-Saxon Coins: Harold I and Harthacnut. By T. Talvio. 74 plates, 1991.

- 41. CUMULATIVE INDEX OF VOLS. 21-40.

By V. Smart. 1992.

- 42. SOUTH-EASTERN MUSEUMS.

Ancient British, Anglo-Saxon and Later Coins to 1279. By A.J.H. Gunstone. 78 plates, 1992.

- 43. NORWEB COLLECTION.

Tokens of the British Isles 1575–1750. Part III. Hampshire to Lincolnshire. By R.H. Thompson and M.J. Dickinson. 51 plates, 1992. (Published by Spink & Son Limited)

- 44. NORWEB COLLECTION.

Tokens of the British Isles 1575–1750. Part IV. Norfolk to Somerset. By R.H. Thompson and M.J. Dickinson. 50 plates, 1993. (Published by Spink & Son Limited)

- 45. LATVIAN COLLECTIONS.

Anglo-Saxon and Later British Coins. By T. Berga. 12 plates, 1996.

- 46. NORWEB COLLECTION.

Tokens of the British Isles 1575–1750. Part V. Staffordshire to Westmorland. By R.H. Thompson and M.J. Dickinson. 51 plates, 1996. (Published by Spink & Son Limited)

- 47. SCHNEIDER COLLECTION.

English Gold Coins and their Imitations. Part I. By P. Woodhead. 83 plates, 1996. (Published by Spink & Son Limited)

- 48. NORTHERN MUSEUMS.

Ancient British, Anglo-Saxon, Norman and Plantagenet Coins to 1279. By J. Booth. 64 plates, 1997.

- 49. NORWEB COLLECTION.

Tokens of the British Isles 1575–1750. Part VI. Wiltshire to Yorkshire, Ireland to Wales. By R.H. Thompson and M.J. Dickinson. 43 plates, 1999. (Published by Spink & Son Limited)

- 50. HERMITAGE MUSEUM, ST PETERSBURG.

Part I. Anglo-Saxon Coins to 1016 By V. M. Potin. 54 plates. 1999.

- 51. ESTONIAN COLLECTIONS.

Anglo-Saxon, Anglo-Norman and later British Coins. By I. Leimus and A. Molvõgin. 54 plates. 2001.

- 52. UPPSALA UNIVERSITY COIN CABINET.

Anglo-Saxon and Anglo-Norman Coins By E. Lindberger. (Publ. jointly with the University of Uppsala.) 37 plates. 2006.

- 53. SCOTTISH MUSEUMS.

English Coins, 1066–1279. By J. D. Bateson. 38 plates. 2001.

- 54. ROYAL COIN CABINET, STOCKHOLM.

Part V: Anglo-Saxon Coins, Edward the Confessor and Harold II. Part VI: Supplement. Anglo-Norman Pennies. Part V by F. Colman; Part VI by M. Blackburn and K. Jonsson.

- 55. HERMITAGE MUSEUM, ST PETERSBURG.

Part IV. English, Irish and Scottish Coins, 1066–1485. By M. Mucha. 23 plates. 2003.

- 56. MASS COLLECTION.

English Short Cross Coins, 1180–1247. By J. P. Mass. 82 plates. 2001.

- 57. SCHNEIDER COLLECTION.

Part II. English Gold Coins, 1603 to the 20th Century. By P. Woodhead. 58 plates. 2002. (Published by Spink & Son Limited)

- 58. NATIONAL MUSEUMS OF SCOTLAND, EDINBURGH.

Scottish Coins. Part I. 1526–1603. By M. C. Q. Holmes. 99 plates. 2006.

- 59. NORWEB COLLECTION.

Tokens of the British Isles 1575–1750. Part VII. City of London. By R. H. Thompson and M. J. Dickinson. 61 plates. 2007.

- 60 HERMITAGE MUSEUM

Part II. Anglo-Saxon Coins 1016–1066. By V.M. Potin. 2011

- 61 SCHNEIDER COLLECTION

Part III. Anglo-Gallic, Flemish and Brantine Gold Coins 1330–1794. By P. Woodhead 2011

- 62 NORWEB COLLECTION

Tokens of the British Isles 1575-1750 Part VIII. Middlesex and Uncertain Pieces. By R.H. Thompson and M.J. Dickinson 2011

- 63 BRITISH MUSEUM

Anglo-Saxon Coins Part I. Early Silver and Gold Coins By A. Gannon 2011

- 64 GROSVENOR MUSEUM, CHESTER

Part II. Anglo-Saxon and Post-Conquest Coins to 1180. By H.E. Pagan 2012

- 65 NORWEGIAN COLLECTIONS

Part I. Anglo-Saxon Coins to 1016. By ELINA SCREEN 2013

- 66. NORWEGIAN COLLECTIONS

Part II. Anglo-Saxon and Later British Coins, 1016–1279. By ELINA SCREEN 2015

- 67 BRITISH MUSEUM

Anglo-Saxon Coins II. Southern English Coinage from Offa to Alfred c. 760–880. By R. NAISMITH 2016.

- 68 THE LYON COLLECTION OF ANGLO-SAXON COINS

By S. LYON.

- 69 THE ABRAMSON COLLECTION

Coins of Early Anglo-Saxon England and the North Sea Area. By T. ABRAMSON

- 70. NATIONAL MUSEUM OF SCOTLAND

Scottish Coins and Dies 1603–1709. By J. D. BATESON and N. HOLMES
