= Robert H. Thompson =

British numismatist

Robert H. Thompson FSA FRNS MCLIP (15 December 1943 – c.2 September 2017), was a British numismatist, with a special interest in tokens and paranumismatica.

== Contribution to numismatics ==
Thompson had a lifelong interest in numismatics, from his first article "Coin collecting" for his school magazine in 1960, to his most important article "Central or local production of seventeenth-century tokens", published in the British Numismatic Journal of 1989, in which he successfully established that the vast majority of these were struck in London, most of them by engravers and coiners working at the Tower Mint. He made hundreds of contributions to journal and periodicals. Many of his shorter notes were connected with publication of the Norweb Collection of Tokens of the British Isles, 1575–1750 – the largest privately owned collection – was published in eight volumes in the Sylloge of Coins of the British Isles series, 1984 to 2011, and will be probably be seen as his greatest achievement. He became librarian of the Royal Numismatic Society in 2010, and for the British Numismatic Society in 2011. He had previously been librarian for the BNS from 1966 to 1981, for which he was awarded that society's Sanford Saltus Gold Medal for 1999.

== Publications ==
SCBI = Sylloge of Coins of the British Isles

- The Norweb Collection Part 1: Bedfordshire to Devon, SCBI 31
- The Norweb Collection Part 2: Dorset, Durham, Essex and Gloucestershire, SCBI 38
- The Norweb Collection Part 3: Hampshire to Lincolnshire, SCBI 43 (with Michael Dickinson)
- The Norweb Collection Part 4: Norfolk to Somerset, SCBI 44 (with Michael Dickinson)
- The Norweb Collection Part 5: Staffordshire to Westmoreland, SCBI 46 (with Michael Dickinson)
- The Norweb Collection Part 6: Wiltshire to Yorkshire, Ireland to Wales SCBI 49 (with Michael Dickinson)
- The Norweb Collection Part 7: City of London, SCBI 59 (with Michael Dickinson)
- The Norweb Collection Part 8: Middlesex & Uncertain Pieces, SCBI 62 (with Michael Dickinson)

== Obituary ==
- Robert Thompson, FRNS, MCLIP, FSA (1944-2017) - by Michael Dickinson, for the Royal Numismatic Society
