= Edward A. Sydenham =

British numismatist

Edward Allen Sydenham (1873–1948) was a British vicar and numismatist, specialising in Roman coins. He was president of the Royal Numismatic Society.

== Life ==
Sydenham was born in Reading, the eldest of three children. Aged 17, he was a pupil of the Reverend Edward Ebenezer Crake, rector of Jevington in Sussex. He went on to Merton College, followed by Wells Theological College.

His career with the church included: curate, St Mary's, Oldham; ordained as deacon in Manchester Cathedral (19 Dec 1897); St Matthew's church, Nottingham (1905); Christ Church, Ealing (1907); vicar of Wolvercote, Oxford (1909); the parish of West Molesey (1927). He retired in 1942.

After retirement, the family moved to Ivy House, Cowes, Isle of Wight, where he continued his interest in history and numismatics. He was an assistant curator at the Carisbrooke Castle Museum. He continued his ministry by providing assistance at St Mary's church, Cowes. Sydenham was buried in Cowes.

Sydenham married twice. He married Ada Lilian Stone on 21 November 1911, their son Eldred St Barbe was born in October 1912. Ada died of peritonitis, aged 20, in 1914. He married Althea Josephine ((known as Jo) Walker in June 1919; their son Michael Wyndham was born in June 1920.

Sydenham was also a numismatist, and author of works on Roman Republican and Imperial coinage. He was president of the Royal Numismatic Society from 1937 to 1942.

He died in the spring of 1948 and is buried in Cowes.

== Selected publications ==
- 1917 Divus Augustus, Numismatic Chronicle 4th ser. 17, pp. 258-278, pl. 11.
- 1917 Historical references on coins of the Roman Empire, from Augustus to Gallienus (London).
- 1917 The mint of Lugdunum, Numismatic Chronicle 4th ser. 17, p. 53-96, pls. 5-6
- 1919 The Roman monetary system. Pt. I, Numismatic Chronicle 4th ser. 18.
- 1919 The Roman monetary system. Pt. II, Numismatic Chronicle 4th ser. 19.
- 1920 The coinage of Nero (London).
- 1920 The coinages of Augustus, Numismatic Chronicle 4th ser. 20, pp. 17-56, pls 2-3.

== See also ==
- List of presidents of the Royal Numismatic Society
- Coins once owned by Sydenham in the British Museum collection
