= Christopher Blunt =

Christopher Blunt may refer to:

- Christopher Blount (1555/56–1601), English soldier, secret agent, and rebel
- Christopher Evelyn Blunt (1904–1987), British merchant banker and numismatist
