= Martin Allen (numismatist) =

British numismatist and historian

Martin Allen, FSA, is a British numismatist and historian, specialising in medieval English coinage. Allen is the Senior Assistant Keeper of Numismatics at the Fitzwilliam Museum in Cambridge, United Kingdom.

== Education and career ==
Martin Allen earned his Ph.D. at Durham University, with a thesis in archaeology, focusing on the Durham mint. He joined the Department of Coins and Medals at the Fitzwilliam Museum in 1997, where he looked after the Corpus of Early Medieval Coin Finds (EMC). He is affiliated with Wolfson College, where he serves as lecturer in the Faculty of History, teaching numismatics and medieval monetary history; he also serves as a College Research Associate. He has an extensive publication record, for which he was awarded a Doctor of Letters (LittD) in 2013. Allen is the Vice President of the British Numismatic Society and editor of the British Numismatic Journal. Currently he has the role of President of the Royal Numismatic Society.

== Awards and honours ==
Allen received the Sanford Saltus Gold Medal of the British Numismatic Society in 2011. In addition, he has also received the North Book Prize of the British Numismatic Society twice, once in 2006 for The Durham Mint. and again in 2014 for Mints and Money in Medieval England.

== Selected works ==
Allen has published several works in the field of numismatology, focusing especially on England in the Middle Ages. His works include the following:

=== Books ===
- The Durham Mint, British Numismatic Society Special Publication 4 (London, 2003)
- Mints and Money in Medieval England (Cambridge: Cambridge University Press, 2012) ISBN 978-1-107-01494-7
- Money and its Use in Medieval Europe Three Decades On. Essays in Honour of Professor Peter Spufford, edited with N. Mayhew, Royal Numismatic Society Special Publication 52 (London, 2017)

=== Articles ===
- "The Calais mint and the wool trade", in M. Allen and N. Mayhew (eds), Money and its Use in Medieval Europe Three Decades On. Essays in Honour of Professor Peter Spufford, Royal Numismatic Society Special Publication 52 (London, 2017), pp. 31−42.
- "Medieval merchants and the English mints", in M. Allen and M. Davies (eds), Medieval Merchants and Money. Essays in Honour of James L. Bolton (London: Institute of Historical Research, 2016), pp. 197−212.
- "A thirteenth-century enquiry into the administration of the Bury St Edmunds mint", British Numismatic Journal 80 (2010), pp. 189–93.
- "Monthly mint output figures for the coinage of Richard III", Numismatic Chronicle 169 (2009), pp. 213–15.
- "The proportions of the denominations in English mint outputs, 1351–1485", British Numismatic Journal 77 (2007), pp. 190–209.
- "The Cambridge mint after the Norman Conquest", Numismatic Chronicle 166 (2006), pp. 237–44.
- "The English currency and the commercialization of England before the Black Death", in Medieval Money Matters, edited by D. Wood (Oxford: Oxbow Books, 2004), pp. 31–50.
- "English coin hoards, 1158–1544", British Numismatic Journal 72 (2002), pp. 24–84.
- "Ecclesiastical mints in thirteenth-century England", in Thirteenth Century England VIII: Proceedings of the Durham Conference 1999, edited by M. Prestwich, R. Britnell and R. Frame (Woodbridge: Boydell and Brewer, 2001), pp. 113–22.
- "The volume of the English currency, 1158–1470", Economic History Review, 2nd series, 54 (2001), pp. 595–611.
- "The volume and composition of the English silver currency, 1279–1351", British Numismatic Journal 70 (2000), pp. 38–44.
- "Documentary evidence for the Henry VI Annulet coinage of York", British Numismatic Journal 65 (1995), pp. 120–34.
- "The Durham mint before Boldon Book", in D. Rollason, M. Harvey and M. Prestwich (eds), Anglo-Norman Durham, 1093–1193 (Woodbridge, 1994), pp. 381–98.
- "The provision and use of Short Cross class V dies", British Numismatic Journal 59 (1989), pp. 46–76.
- "The Carlisle and Durham mints in the Short Cross period", British Numismatic Journal 49 (1979), pp. 42–55.

== See also ==
- British Numismatic Society
- Royal Numismatic Society
- British Numismatic Journal
