= Anthemius of Cyprus =

Cypriot archbishop

Anthemius (or Anthemios) was the archbishop of Cyprus in the late 5th century.

As archbishop of Cyprus, Anthemius was the metropolitan bishop over the island with his see at Salamis-Constantia.

Anthemius resisted the efforts of the non-Chalcedonian patriarch of Antioch, Peter the Fuller, to restore his patriarchal authority on Cyprus. In the process, he discovered what he claimed were the relics of Barnabas, buried with a copy of the Gospel of Matthew. This served to prove that the Church of Cyprus was of apostolic foundation. According to the Laudatio Barnabae, written around 550, Anthemius saw Barnabas in a dream three nights in a row and the saint told him where he lay buried beneath a carob tree. After discovering the saint's body, Anthemius went to Constantinople. He gave the gospel to the Emperor Zeno, who had the patriarch of Constantinople summon a synod to rule in favour of Cyprus against Antioch.

In 488, Zeno confirmed the Cypriot church's autocephaly and financed the construction of a church to hold Barnabas's relics. Many local notables contributed to the construction, which was begun immediately. This first building was a pilgrimage church and probably served as a stopover for many on the way to Jerusalem. The remains of this building are today a part of the monastery of Saint Barnabas.

As the gospel that Anthemius gave to Zeno was a codex, it could not have been an authentic 1st-century copy. There are, however, different interpretations of the fraud. Michael Metcalf sees Anthemius as the deceiver (and Zeno the dupe) in a game of high politics with the patriarch of Antioch. Glen Bowersock, on the other hand, sees Zeno and Anthemius as working together to resolve a dispute the Emperor was equally interested in resolving.

The claim that Zeno granted Anthemius regalian privileges is found in nothing earlier than the 16th-century works of Florio Bustron, who may have invented it.

== Bibliography ==
- Bowersock, G. W. (2000). The International Role of Late Antique Cyprus. Bank of Cyprus Cultural Foundation.
- Cosby, Michael R. (2021). Creation of History, Second Edition: The Transformation of Barnabas from Peacemaker to Warrior Saint (2nd ed.). Wipf and Stock.
- Huffman, Joseph P. (2015). "The Donation of Zeno: St. Barnabas and the Origins of the Cypriot Archbishop's Regalia Privileges". Journal of Ecclesiastical History. 66 (2): 1–26. doi:10.1017/S0022046914002073.
- Loverance, Rowena K. (2018). "Anthemius (5th cent.)". In Nicholson, Oliver (ed.). The Oxford Dictionary of Late Antiquity, Volume 1: A–I. Oxford: Oxford University Press. p. 82. ISBN 978-0-19-881624-9.
- Loverance, Rowena K. (2018). "Barnabas, Monastery of S.". In Nicholson, Oliver (ed.). The Oxford Dictionary of Late Antiquity, Volume 1: A–I. Oxford: Oxford University Press. p. 214. ISBN 978-0-19-881624-9.
- Metcalf, David Michael (2009). Byzantine Cyprus, 491–1191. Cyprus Research Centre.
