= Monastery of Saint Barnabas =

Coordinates: 35°10′29″N 33°52′49″E

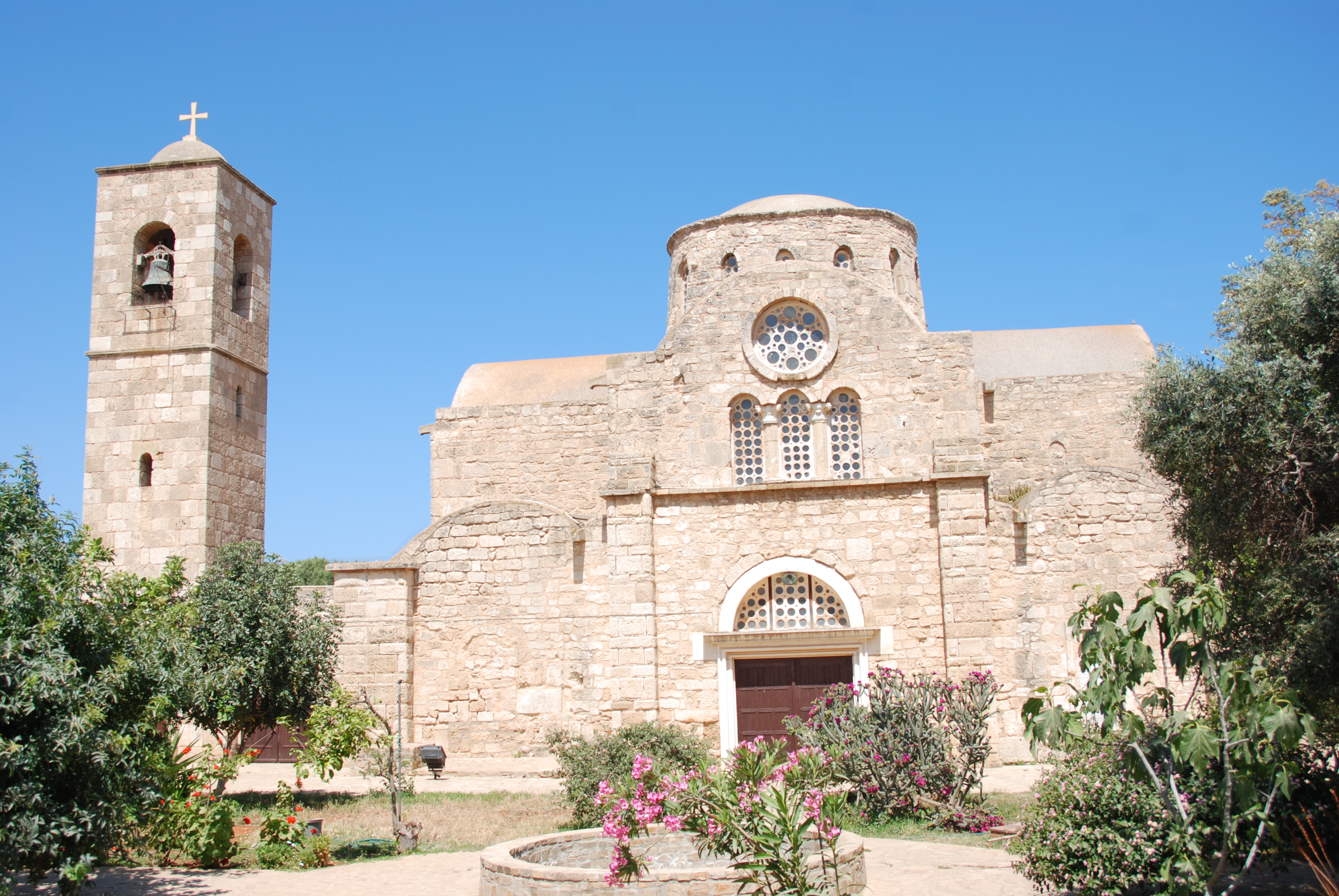
The church today

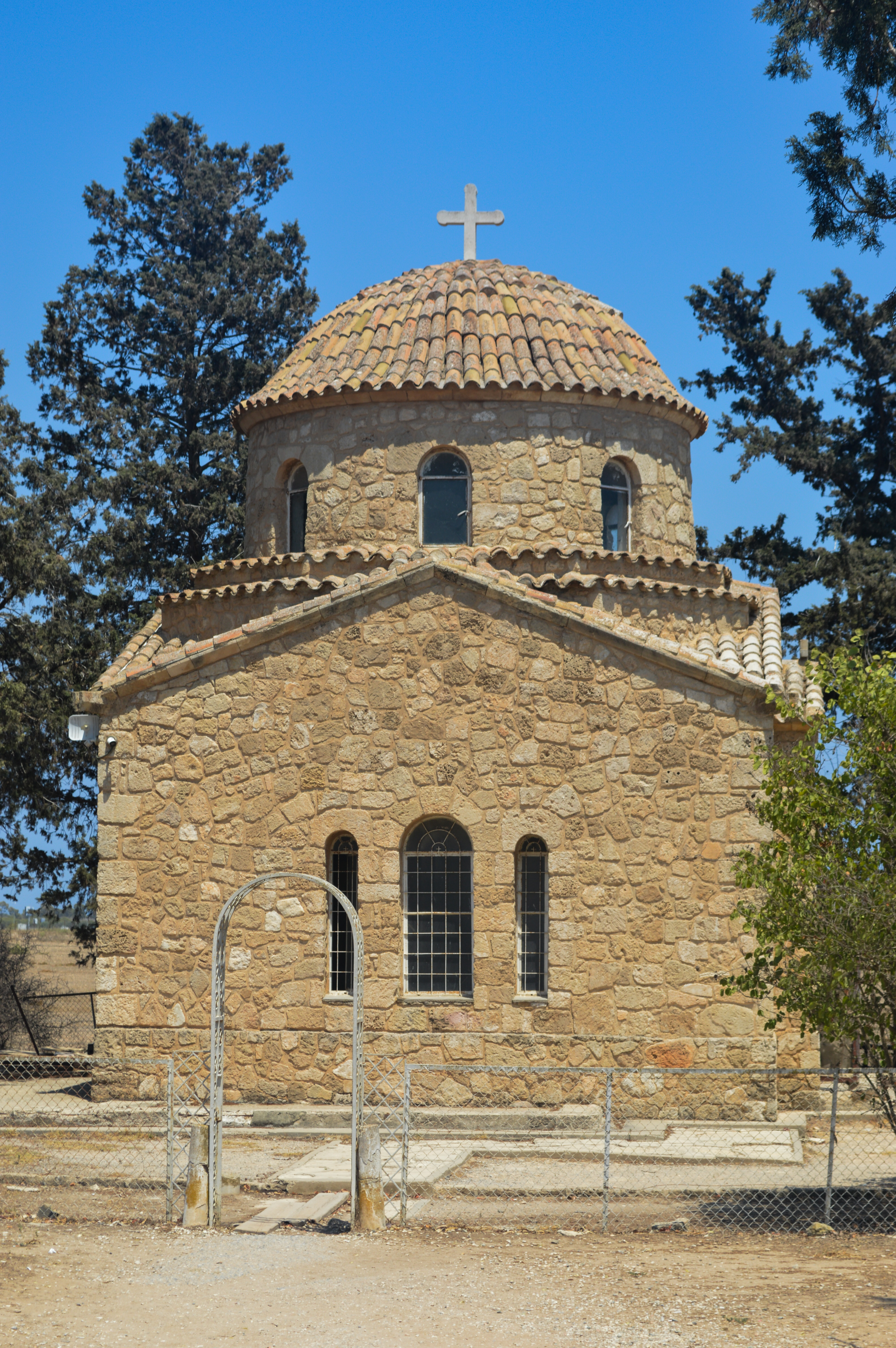
Outside view of St. Barnabas Mausoleum Tomb

The monastery of Saint Barnabas (or Ayios Barnabas) was a church on the island of Cyprus, 2 kilometres (1.2 mi) west of Constantia. Today the site is in Northern Cyprus and functions as a museum.

The original shrine church was founded in the late fifth century, perhaps in 477, when the Emperor Zeno financed the construction of a basilica near the spot where the body of Barnabas was discovered by Archbishop Anthemius. Funding was also provided by local notables. The church had a timber roof and included stoas, gardens, aqueducts, and hostels intended for receiving pilgrims. It may have been expected that pilgrims on their way to Jerusalem might stop in Constantia and visit the shrine. The sixth-century Laudatio Barnabae describes the new tomb of Barnabas as decorated with silver and marble. It also attested the existence of a monastic community living beside the shrine. The relics were eventually moved to the basilica of Saint Epiphanius in Constantia.

Two buildings were added to the complex during the reign of Justinian I (527–565) by the next archbishop, Philoxenos, who left a short inscription recording his work. In the late seventh century, the basilica was destroyed during Arab raids.

Today, what remains of the original basilica is incorporated in the east end of a newer vaulted basilica of the cross-in-square type, built around 900. The church has three aisles and two flat domes on tall drums. It may have been the residence of the archbishops for a couple centuries after the abandonment of Constantia in the late eighth century.

Although the second construction remained standing throughout the centuries and continued function as a pilgrimage church, the continuity of the monastic community, although possible, cannot be demonstrated. Wilbrand of Oldenburg visited the church in the 13th century, noting that the city around it was "destroyed". In 1735, Vasil Grigorovich-Barsky visited the site and drew a sketch of the cloisters, courtyards and outbuildings. The current form of the buildings is a result of work done in 1756 by Archbishop Philotheos. Between 1971 and 1974, the monastery had three monks who made their living by selling honey and painting icons. The monastery was abandoned following the 1974 Turkish invasion of Cyprus.

No longer hosting a monastic community, the church today function as a museum of icons. The former cloisters host an archaeological museum with artefacts going back to the Neolithic.

== Bibliography ==
- Huffman, Joseph P. (2015). "The Donation of Zeno: St. Barnabas and the Origins of the Cypriot Archbishop's Regalia Privileges". Journal of Ecclesiastical History. 66 (2): 1–26. doi:10.1017/S0022046914002073. S2CID 155251320.
- Loverance, Rowena K. (2018). "Barnabas, Monastery of S.". In Nicholson, Oliver (ed.). The Oxford Dictionary of Late Antiquity. Oxford: Oxford University Press. p. 214. ISBN 978-0-19-866277-8.
- Majle, Agnieszka; Paseczny, Robet G., eds. (2016) [2006]. DK Eyewitness Cyprus. Dorling Kindersley.
- Megaw, A. H. S. (2006). "The Campanopetra Reconsidered: The Pilgrimage Church of Apostle Barnabas". In E. Jeffreys (ed.). Byzantine Style, Religion, and Civilization: In Honour of Sir Steven Runciman. Cambridge University Press. pp. 394–404.
- Metcalf, David Michael (2009). Byzantine Cyprus, 491–1191. Cyprus Research Centre.
