= Sanford Saltus Gold Medal =

The John Sanford Saltus Medal is the premier distinction of the British Numismatic Society, awarded triennially, on the vote of Members, for the recipient's scholarly contributions to British Numismatics. The medal was established in 1910 with a generous donation by Mr John Sanford Saltus (1854-1922), a past-President of the Society.

Although the award was initially based on publications in the British Numismatic Journal, the regulations were widened in 2005 to take account of an author's entire publications in the field and to make non-members eligible for the award. An appeal in 2005 established a Prize Fund to support this and the Society's other prizes.

== Recipients of the Medal ==
- 1910: P. W. P. Carlyon-Britton
- 1911: Helen Farquhar
- 1914: W. J. Andrew
- 1917: L. A. Lawrence
- 1920: Lt Col. H. W. Morrieson
- 1923: H. A. Parsons
- 1926: G. R. Francis
- 1929: J. S. Shirley-Fox
- 1932: C. Winter
- 1935: R. Carlyon-Britton
- 1938: W. C. Wells
- 1941: C. A. Whitton
- 1944: (Not awarded)
- 1947: R. C. Lockett
- 1950: C. E. Blunt
- 1953: D. F. Allen
- 1956: F. Elmore Jones
- 1959: R. H. M. Dolley
- 1962: H. H. King
- 1965: H. Schneider
- 1968: E. J. Winstanley
- 1968: C. W. Peck (posthumous award)
- 1971: B. H. I. H. Stewart
- 1974: C. S. S. Lyon
- 1977: S. E. Rigold
- 1980: Marion M. Archibald
- 1983: D. M. Metcalf
- 1986: Joan E. L. Murray
- 1989: H. E. Pagan
- 1992: C. E. Challis
- 1995: J. J. North
- 1997: P. Grierson (special award)
- 1999: R. H. Thompson
- 2002: E. M. Besly
- 2005: P. Woodhead
- 2008: M. A. S. Blackburn
- 2011: M. R. Allen
- 2014: N J Mayhew
- 2017: N M McQ Holmes
- 2020: D. Dykes
- 2023: B. J. Cook
