= David Grenville Sellwood =

David Grenville John Sellwood (1925-2012) was a British aeronautical engineer and numismatist, specialising in Parthian coins. He was President of the Royal Numismatic Society.

== Publications ==
A full list of Sellwood's publications can be found in Ancient Iranian Numismatics. In Memory of David Sellwood.

- 1971 An Introduction to the Coinage of Parthia (London). 1st edition.
- 1980 An Introduction to the Coinage of Parthia (London). 2nd edition.

== See also ==
- List of presidents of the Royal Numismatic Society
- Royal Numismatic Society
