= Mark Blackburn (numismatist) =

British numismatist (1953–2011)

Mark Alistair Sinclair Blackburn, FSA, FRHistS (5 January 1953 – 1 September 2011) was a British numismatist and economic historian. He was educated at the Skinners' School in Tunbridge Wells and St Edmund Hall, Oxford. He was Keeper of Coins and Medals at Fitzwilliam Museum from 1991 to 2011, Reader in Numismatics and Monetary History at the University of Cambridge from 2004 to 2011, and a Fellow of Gonville and Caius College, Cambridge from 2005. He was the President of the British Numismatic Society between 2004 and 2008.

== Honours ==
In 1983, Blackburn was elected a Fellow of the Society of Antiquaries of London (FSA). In 1989, he was elected a Fellow of the Royal Historical Society (FRHistS). He was awarded the 2008 Medal of the Royal Numismatic Society. In 2008, he was awarded the John Sanford Saltus Medal by the British Numismatic Society. In 2011, he was awarded the Derek Allen Prize by the British Academy.

He died of cancer aged 58, and was survived by his wife and three children.

Early Medieval Monetary History: Studies in Memory of Mark Blackburn, edited by Rory Naismith, Martin Allen and Elina Screen, was published in 2014.
