= Derek Allen =

British numismatist, Treasurer of the British Academy 1973–1975

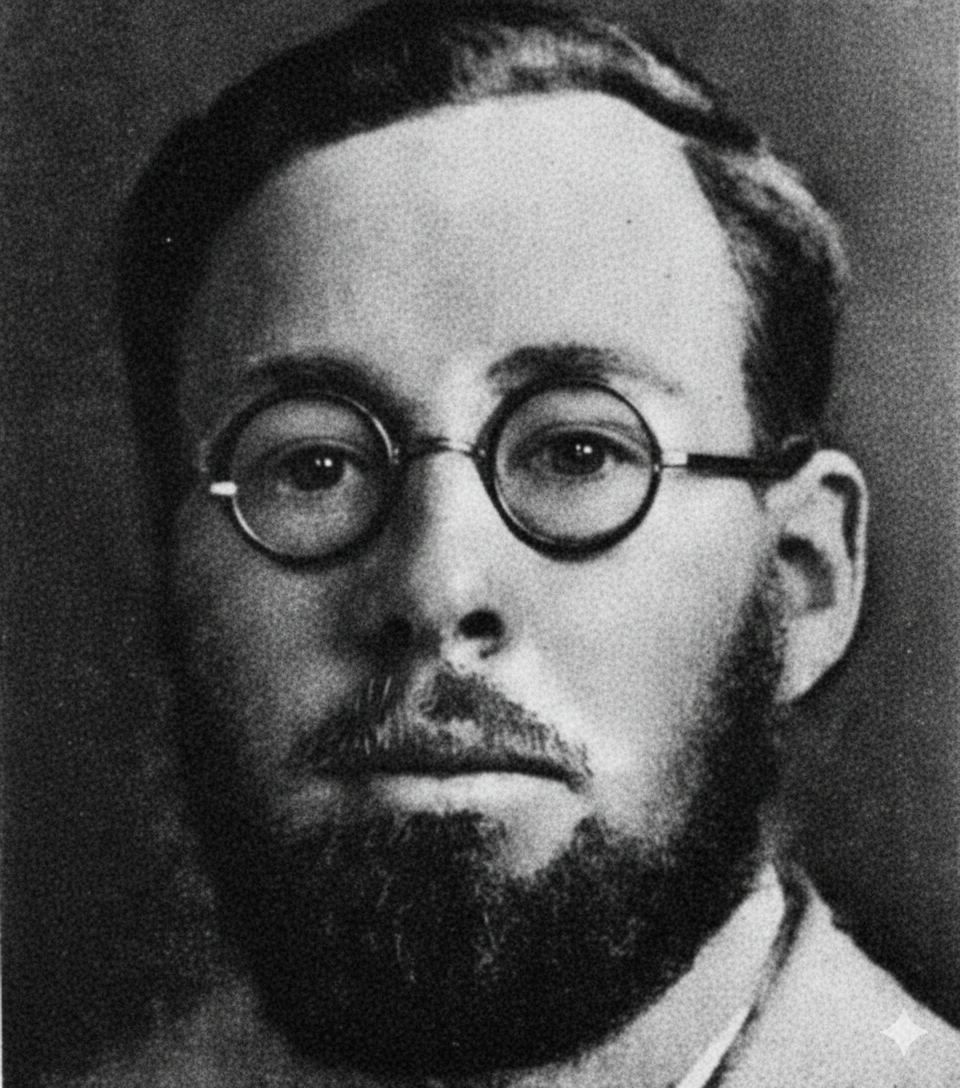
- Derek Fortrose Allen in 1934
- Born: Derek Fortrose Allen; 29 May 1910; Epsom, Surrey, England
- Died: 13 June 1975 (aged 65); Chipping Norton, Oxfordshire, England
- Occupations: Numismatist and archaeologist

Derek Fortrose Allen CB FBA FSA (29 May 1910 – 13 June 1975) was Secretary of the British Academy from 1969 to 1973 and Treasurer of that organisation from 1973 until his death.

Born in Epsom, Surrey, Allen studied at the British School at Rome, Italy, in 1933–1934, thanks to a £100 scholarship. During this period, he dubbed Stan Laurel in the Italian version of one or more Laurel and Hardy films, working together with Paolo Canali who dubbed Oliver Hardy. The dubbing was done at the Metro-Goldwyn-Mayer dubbing studio in Rome, for the equivalent of two pounds a day; Allen described it as "one of the most profitable things I have ever done". As most early Italian dubs of Laurel and Hardy films have been lost, it is unknown how many films he dubbed. In an interview with the newspaper Cinema Illustrazione dated October 10, 1934, Allen said that he and Canali were finishing the dub of Hollywood Party, however when a fragment of the Italian dub of that film was found in 2024, it was shown that Laurel is dubbed by Allen's successor, Carlo Cassola, while Hardy is indeed dubbed by Canali.

Allen joined the British Museum staff in 1935 as an Assistant Keeper in the Coin Room. Relatively inexperienced in numismatics at first, he soon had to deal with the classification of the Edward I and II coins in the Boyton hoard of 4000 coins, followed by the classification of the Clarke-Thornhill bequest of 12,000 coins. He became acknowledged as the leading authority on Ancient British coins and as one of the leading authorities on contemporaneous Continental issues. His project on defining the coinage of Henry II was interrupted by the Second World War and was eventually completed in 1947.

Allen joined the British Numismatic Society in 1935 and served as its Secretary from 1938 to 1941 and was Editor of volumes XXII and XXIII of the Journal. He was elected as president from 1959 to 1963, was awarded the Sanford Saltus Gold Medal in 1953 and elected an Honorary Member in 1971. He was afterwards President of the Royal Numismatic Society from 1966 to 1970 and awarded that Society's medal in 1966.

He was elected a Fellow of the British Academy in 1963 and finished his career as Secretary, then Treasurer, of the Academy. After his death in 1975, his widow Winifred Allen established with the Academy in 1976 a prize in his memory - the Derek Allen Prize - to be awarded annually to recognise outstanding published work in Musicology, Celtic Studies and Numismatics.

A list of his publications can be found in the Numismatic Chronicle 16, 136 (1976), pp. 259–71.
