= Edith Hall Dohan =

American art historian and archaeologist

Edith Hall Donan
- Born: 31 December 1877; New Haven, Connecticut
- Died: 14 July 1943 (aged 65); Philadelphia, Pennsylvania
- Education: Smith College; Bryn Mawr College; American School of Classical Studies at Athens
- Occupation: Archaeologist

Edith Hayward Hall Dohan (31 December 1877–14 July 1943) was an American archaeologist who earned Bryn Mawr College's first classical archaeology Ph.D. Hall was part of an excavation team with Harriet Boyd in her early career that most notably brought the first Mycenaean and pre-Mycenaean collection to be displayed in America. Hall later wrote The Decorative Art of Crete in the Bronze Age, which was published in 1906 that breaks down the evolution of the art and pottery in Crete from the Bronze Age.

== Early life ==
On December 31, 1877, Dohan was born as Edith Hayward Hall in New Haven, Connecticut. Edith's father was Ely Ransom Hall, a teacher. Edith's mother was Mary Jane (new Smith). Edith was the second of three children with a father who attended Yale University.

== Education ==
Edith attended Woodstock Academy in Woodstock, Connecticut, along with her brother and sister, where her father, Ely Hall, was the principal.

Hall then attended Smith College in Northampton, MA. Her classes included Greek, Latin, and Mathematics. In 1899, Dohan received her Bachelor of Arts from Smith College. Hall then pursued her graduate studies at Bryn Mawr College in Bryn Mawr, Pennsylvania. During her time at Bryn Mawr, she was awarded the Mary E. Garrett Fellowship. Hall applied for the Agnes Hoppin Memorial Fellow at the American School of Classical Studies in Athens. She was selected for the fellowship, and started at the school in Fall of 1903. Hall was the only female student and stayed at the Merlin House, which was close to the school. Hall decided to study Mycenaean items and their patterns. Hall's time at the American School of Classical studies came to an end in 1905. In 1906, Dohan earned a PhD in classical archaeology from Bryn Mawr College.

Dohan's 1907 dissertation focused on art in Bronze Age Crete.

== Gournia, 1904 ==
In February, 1904, Richard Seager sent Edith Hall news via telegram that she was invited to join Harriet Boyd in Gournia as Boyd wished to have a female companion to join her team on excavations in Crete. While working with Boyd, Dohan was to work as Boyd's assistant due to people looking down on a single female working alongside many men.

Hall was able to receive a grant from the American Exploration Society specifically to be in Gournia as Boyd's assistant.

Hall and Boyd had never met each other prior to Hall arriving to Gournia, Crete where she would begin her work in 1904. Upon arriving to Crete, Boyd realized that Hall was the ideal candidate for an assistant. Hall came onto the excavation site with knowledge of the Greek language and her previous studies, of Minoan and Mycenaean pottery designs, which meant she did not need much training compared to other candidates.

Once returning to their original dig site, Boyd hired "about one hundred local men" to work alongside Boyd and Hall to help. While the workers were digging throughout the day, Hall's day consisted of "arriving to the field by 7:30 A.M., her and Boyd would direct men until they broke at around 11:00... Hall would return at 3:00 and stay until sunset... followed by a swim in the sea before dinner, would conclude her day." Hall and Boyd would have other obligations due to being women in their dig group. They would need to participate in local events, such as attending weddings or funerals, in order to gain favor of the locals to be able to dig for future years.

During Hall's time at the dig site, she would have to take notes on where any object was found, how deep they were underground, and clean them in hydrochloric acid to be photographed and placed in scrapbooks documenting their findings.

After spending time at Boyd's dig site, Hall asked Boyd if she could have her own dig site. Boyd obliged, and gave Hall a site that was thought to be unimportant land in the main digging sites. Following her procedures of recording place and depth at her old digging site. Since Boyd could not afford to give more people to work on a "waste dump" area of the digging grounds, only Hall, a first year student Leslie Shear and another woman named Miss Boyle worked on the site. In the early weeks of digging at her new site, she discovered thousands of shards of pottery, but after several weeks, Hall discovered there was not a correlation between depth and age and finding that the shards she had been uncovering dated back to around 2000 B.C. Spending more time on this dig site, Hall was able to recover "twenty thousand vase fragments, but only five joints were made."

From all of the findings at Hall's dig site, she "received an invitation to present her findings at the International Archaeological Congress in Athens in early 1905."

Hall's dig ended in the later half of May, 1905. Boyd and Hall shipped their findings to the United States which ended up forming the first Mycenaean and pre-Mycenaean collection to be displayed in America.

== Career ==
In 1908, Dohan started her career as an instructor of classical archaeology at Mount Holyoke College. During her time at Mount Holyoke College Hall was allowed to return to Crete to continue her excavations during the Spring semesters and taught during the Fall. Dohan went to two sites in Crete working through Penn Museum in 1910 and 1912. Her time teaching at Mount Holyoke College came to an end in 1912 but Hall would return in 1913 to give a guest presentation. In 1912, Dohan became the assistant curator of the Mediterranean Section at the Penn Museum. In 1921, Hall returned to Bryn Mawr College to become a part time instructor. In 1920, Dohan became a consultant for the Penn Museum and later in 1930 she became the associate curator. In 1942, Dohan became the curator at the University Museum at University of Pennsylvania.

Dohan later went on to do noteworthy work on ancient Greece and at points visited Crete. Later in life she became interested in the Etruscan civilization. She published an important corpus of Italic tomb groups held in the collection of the University of Pennsylvania Museum of Archaeology and Anthropology.

== Personal life ==
On May 12, 1915, Dohan married Joseph M. Dohan, a lawyer and gentleman farmer. Dohan's children were David Hayward Warrington Dohan and Katharine Elizabeth Dohan. In 1939, Dohan's daughter, Katharine Elizabeth Dohan, married Sir Denys Lionel Page, an Englishman. On July 14, 1943, Dohan died in Philadelphia, Pennsylvania.

== Awards ==
While attending Bryn Mawr, Hall was awarded the Mary E. Garrett Fellowship. Hall was also awarded the Agnes Hoppin Memorial Fellowship of the American School of Classical Studies in Athens in 1903.
