= Lida Shaw King =

American classical scholar and college dean

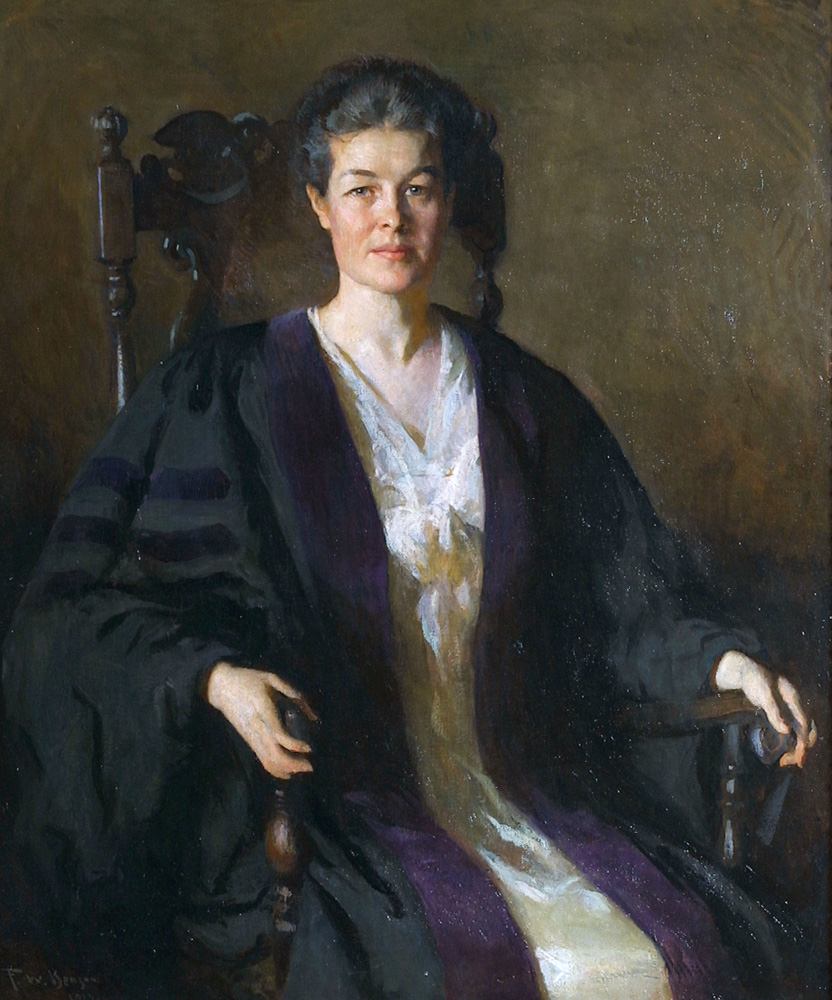
Lida Shaw King, painted by Frank Weston Benson

Lida Shaw King (September 15, 1868 in Boston – January 10, 1932 in Providence) was an American classical scholar and college dean.

== Biography ==
Lida Shaw King was born in Boston, Massachusetts. Her parents were Henry Melville King and Susan Ellen Fogg King. She graduated from Vassar College in 1890 and from Brown University (A.M.) in 1894 and continued her graduate studies at Vassar (1894–1895), Radcliffe (1897–1898), Bryn Mawr (1899–1900), and at the American School of Classical Studies in Athens (1900–1901) where she was awarded the Agnes Hoppin Memorial Fellowship. She taught the classics at Vassar (1894–1897) and at the Packer Collegiate Institute (1898–1899, 1901–1902), and at Brown was assistant professor of classical philology (1905–1909), dean of the Women's College from 1905 to 1922, and professor of classical literature and archæology 1909–1922. She made contributions to the American Journal of Archaeology.

She resigned from her positions at Brown in 1922 due to illness, and died in Providence on January 10, 1932. She is buried at Evergreen Cemetery in Portland, Maine. An appreciation of her work as Dean at Brown University was written by Mary Emma Woolley in 1923.

== Publications ==
- with Ida Thallon-Hill Corinth: Results of Excavations Conducted by the American School of Classical Studies at Athens: Volume IV Part I: Decorated Architectural Terracottas Harvard University Press (1929)
