= H. R. Loyn =

British historian (1922–2000)

- Born: 16 June 1922; Cardiff, Wales
- Died: 9 October 2000 (aged 78); Penarth, Wales
- Spouse: Patricia Haskew (m. 1950)

Academic work
- Institutions: University of London

Henry Royston Loyn (16 June 1922 – 9 October 2000), was a British historian specialising in the history of Anglo-Saxon England. His eminence in his field made him a natural candidate to run the Sylloge of the Coins of the British Isles, which he chaired from 1979 to 1993. He was Professor of Medieval History at the University College of South Wales and Monmouthshire and afterwards Professor of Medieval History at Westfield College in the University of London.

== Biography ==
Henry Royston Loyn was born in Cardiff, Wales, on 16 June 1922, the only son of Violet May "Vi" (née Thomas) and Henry George Loyn, a shopkeeper; the family was lower middle class. He married Patricia Haskew in 1950. He died unexpectedly on 9 October 2000 following a diabetic crisis that led to heart failure.

== Works ==
The Sylloge's natural emphasis is on Anglo-Saxon numismatics. Loyn's extensive work in this specialised literature of an often-contentious area of history produced over four decades of writings on the evolving changes in late Anglo-Saxon and Anglo-Norman England. His publications were well received in the academic press, and Loyn is still a staple of student reading-lists today.

Aside from numerous articles, occasional lectures such as The "Matter of Britain": A Historian's Perspective (a Creighton Trust lecture), and his main publications (see below), he edited The Middle Ages: A Concise Encyclopedia. He has been praised for his "felicitous, economic writing style".

== Selected publications ==
- 1953. "The term ealdorman in the translations prepared at the time of King Alfred." English Historical Review 68 (1953): 513–25.
- 1955. "The imperial style of the 10th century Anglo-Saxon kings." History NS 40. 111–5.
- 1955. "Gesiths and thegns in Anglo-Saxon England from the 7th to the 10th century." English Historical Review 70. 529–49.
- 1957. "The king and the structure of society in late Anglo-Saxon England." History NS 42. 87–100. Reprinted in Society and peoples (1992).
- 1961. "The origin and early development of the Saxon borough, with special reference to Cricklade." Wiltshire Archaeological and Natural History Magazine 58:209. 7–15.
- 1961. "Boroughs and Mints AD 900–1066." In Anglo-Saxon Coins: Studies presented to F. M. Stenton, ed. R.H.M. Dolley. 122–35.
- 1962. Anglo-Saxon England and the Norman Conquest (vol. I in The Social and Economic History of England, ed. Asa Briggs). 2nd ed.: Longmans, Harlow, 1991.
- 1963. The Making of the English Nation. From the Anglo-Saxons to Edward I. New ed.: 1991.
- 1965. The Norman Conquest. 3rd ed.: 1982. A synthesis for the general reader.
- 1966. Norman Britain. Drawings by the artist Alan Sorrell.
- 1966. Harold, son of Godwin. Historical Association, 1066 commemoration 2. Bexhill-on-Sea and London.
- 1967. Alfred the Great. Oxford.
- 1971. Ed. A Wulfstan Manuscript. Introduction to a facsimile edition of a majorsource document for Wulfstan II, Archbishop of York.
- 1971. "Towns in late Anglo-Saxon England: the evidence and some possible lines of enquiry." In England before the Conquest: studies in primary sources presented to Dorothy Whitelock, ed. Peter Clemoes and Kathleen Hughes. Cambridge, 1971. 115–28.
- 1974. "Kinship in Anglo-Saxon England." Anglo-Saxon England 3. 197–209.
- 1974, with Harry Hearder (eds.). British Government and Administration. Studies presented to S. B. Chrimes. Cardiff.
- 1974. "The Hundred in England in the Tenth and Early Eleventh Centuries." In British Government and Administration (passim). Cardiff. 1–15.
- 1975, with John Percival (trs.). The Reign of Charlemagne: Documents on Carolingian Government and Administration. Documents of Medieval History 2. London.
- 1975. "Church and state in England in the tenth and eleventh centuries." In Tenth-century studies: essays in commemoration of the millennium of the Council of Winchester and Regularis Concordia, ed. David Parsons. London. 94–102.
- 1976. The Vikings in Wales. Dorothea Coke Memorial Lecture. Viking Society for Northern Research. London. Available online from the Viking Society for Northern Research.
- 1977. The Vikings in Britain. Revised editions: London, 1983; Oxford and Cambridge (MA), 1994.
- 1978. "Domesday Book." Proceedings of the Battle Conference on Anglo-Norman Studies 1 (1978): 121–30.
- 1979. "Anglo-Saxon England. Reflections and insights." History 64:211. 171–81.
- 1980–1. "Wales and England in the tenth century: the context of the Æthelstan charters." Welsh History Review 10 (1980–1): 283–301.
- 1980. "The Norman conquest of the English language." History Today 30:4. 35–9.
- 1984. The Governance of Anglo-Saxon England, 500–1087. Part of series The Governance of England.
- 1984. "The conversion of the English to Christianity: some comments on the Celtic contribution." In Welsh society and nationhood: historical essays presented to Glanmor Williams, ed. R. R. Davies et al. Cardiff. 5–18.
- 1986. "Progress in Anglo-Saxon monetary history." In Anglo-Saxon monetary history: essays in memory of Michael Dolley, ed. M. Blackburn. Leicester. 1–10.
- 1987. "The beyond of Domesday Book." In Domesday studies. Papers read at the novocentenary conference of the Royal Historical Society and the Institute of British Geographers. Winchester, 1986, ed. James Clarke Holt. Woodbridge. 1–13.
- 1987. "William's bishops: some further thoughts." Anglo-Norman Studies 10. 223–35.
- 1987. "A general introduction to Domesday Book." In Domesday Book Studies, ed. Ann Williams and R. W. H. Erskine. Cambridgeshire Domesday 3. 1987. 1–21.
- 1989. "Rayleigh in Essex: its implications for the Norman settlement." In Studies in medieval history presented to R. Allen Brown, ed. C. Harper-Bill et al. Woodbridge. 235–40.
- 1990. "Epic and Romance." In England in the twelfth century. Proceedings of the 1988 Harlaxton Symposium, ed. Daniel Williams. Woodbridge. 153–63.
- 1990. "1066: should we have celebrated?" Historical Research 63 (1990): 119–27.
- 1991. "Bede's kings. A comment on the attitude of Bede to the nature of secular kingship." In Eternal values in medieval life, ed. Nicole Crossley-Holland. Lampeter. 54–64.
- 1992. Society and peoples. Studies in the history of England and Wales, c.600–1200. London.
- 1992. "Kings, gesiths and thegns." In The age of Sutton Hoo: the seventh century in North-Western Europe, ed. Martin Carver. Woodbridge, 1992. 75–9.
- 1992. "De iure domini regis: a comment on royal authority in eleventh-century England." In England in the eleventh century. Proceedings of the 1990 Harlaxton symposium, ed. Carola Hicks. Harlaxton Medieval Studies 2. Stamford. 17–24.
- 1994. "From witenagemot to concilium: the antecedents of the House of Lords." In The House of Lords: a thousand years of British tradition, ed. Robert Smith and John S. Moore. London. 21–7.
- 1994. "Abbots of English monasteries in the period following the Norman conquest." In England and Normandy in the Middle Ages, ed. David Bates and Anne Curry. London. 95–103.
- 1995. The church and the law in Anglo-Saxon England. Vaughan paper 37. Leicester.
- 1997. "Llanfyllin. The charter and the laws of Breteuil." Montgomeryshire Collections 85 (1997): 13–21.
- 2000. The English Church, 940–1154. Series The Medieval World. Harlow. ISBN 0-582-30303-6.
- 2007. "Anglo-Saxon England." In A century of British medieval studies, ed. Alan Deyermond. British Academy centenary monographs. Oxford: OUP, 2007. 7–26.
