= Agnes Hoppin Memorial Fellowship =

The Agnes Hoppin Memorial Fellowship was an academic fellowship intended to "lift the restrictions on women in the study of archaeology". It was established at the American School of Classical Studies in Athens in 1898 by the Hoppin family.

The award was founded in memory of Agnes Clark Hoppin by her brother, Professor Joseph Hoppin. It was awarded from 1898 to 1904 and was worth $1,000 per year.

== List of Fellows ==
The recipients were:

- 1898–1899 May Louise Nichols, Smith College
- 1899–1900 Harriet Ann Boyd, Smith College
- 1900–1901 Lida Shaw King, Vassar College
- 1901–1902 Agnes Baldwin, Barnard College
- 1902–1903 Leila Clement Spaulding, Vassar College
- 1903–1904 Edith Hayward Hall, Smith College
