= Leila Clement Spaulding =

American classicist and archaeologist

Dr. Leila Clement Spaulding
- Born: 1878; Morristown, New Jersey
- Died: 1 January 1973 (aged 94–95); Lake Hamilton, Florida
- Spouse: Edward Winans Kent
- Parent(s): Wayland Spaulding and Lucy Wyer Clement
- Awards: Agnes Hoppin Memorial Fellowship

Academic background
- Education: Vassar College and Columbia University

Academic work
- Discipline: Classics; Classical Archaeology

Leila Clement Spaulding (1878–1973) was an American classicist and archaeologist who taught Greek at Vassar College (1903–1907), lectured in art and archaeology at Bryn Mawr College and was Assistant Professor of Classics at Colorado College from 1911 to 1914. She was the first woman professor with a PhD at Colorado College. As well as her teaching responsibilities, Spaulding worked on classical sculpture publishing the book of her PhD thesis on the "Camillus"-Type in sculpture.

== Biography ==
Spaulding was born in Morristown, New Jersey. She attended Vassar College and received her AB in 1899 and completed her MA at Columbia University in 1901. She then conducted research at Columbia University on classical sculpture and was awarded her PhD in 1911. During her PhD studies, Spaulding taught Greek at Vassar College, and art and architecture at Bryn Mawr College. From 1901 Spaulding was a Fellow at the American School of Classical Studies at Athens and also traveled to Rome to further her studies.

In 1911 Spaulding was the first woman with a PhD to be appointed as a professor at Colorado College. After Spaulding's appointment to Colorado College, additional members of the female faculty with PhDs were appointed frequently in following years. While at Colorado College Spaulding was the resident faculty member at Ticknor Hall.

== Honours ==
Spaulding was a Curtis Scholar while a graduate student at Columbia University.

== Agnes Hoppin Memorial Fellowship ==
Spaulding was awarded the Agnes Hoppin Memorial Fellowship in 1902 at the American School of Classical Studies at Athens.

== Personal life ==
Spaulding married Edward Winans Kent on 22 July 1914. Spaulding left her career at Colorado College after her marriage and lived in New York, Colorado Springs, and Lake Hamilton with her husband.

== Publications ==
=== Books ===
- The "Camillus"-Type in Sculpture, (Lancaster 1911)

=== Articles ===
- "On Dating Early Attic Inscriptions", in American Journal of Archaeology 10 (1906) 394–404
