= Tatjana Berga =

Latvian archaeologist and numismatist

Tatjana Berga (9 December 1944 – 2 October 2020) was a Latvian archaeologist and numismatist.

== Career ==
Born in the Russian SFSR, Soviet Union, her family relocated to the Latvian SSR. After graduating in history from the University of Latvia in 1972, she studied numismatics in St. Petersburg under Vsevolod Potin. She took her doctorate with a thesis on monetary finds in Latvia's 10th to 12th-century archaeological material.

She mainly conducted excavations in Valmiera, but also Riga, Jelgava and Latgale. She was also known for editing volume 45 of the Sylloge of Coins of the British Isles, Latvian Collections: Anglo-Saxon and Later British Coins (1996). Her last book was Valmieras vecpilsētas arheoloģija (2018). A Festschrift was issued to her in Arheoloģija un etnogrāfija XXXI (2020).
