= David Mattingly (archaeologist) =

British archaeologist

David Mattingly FBA
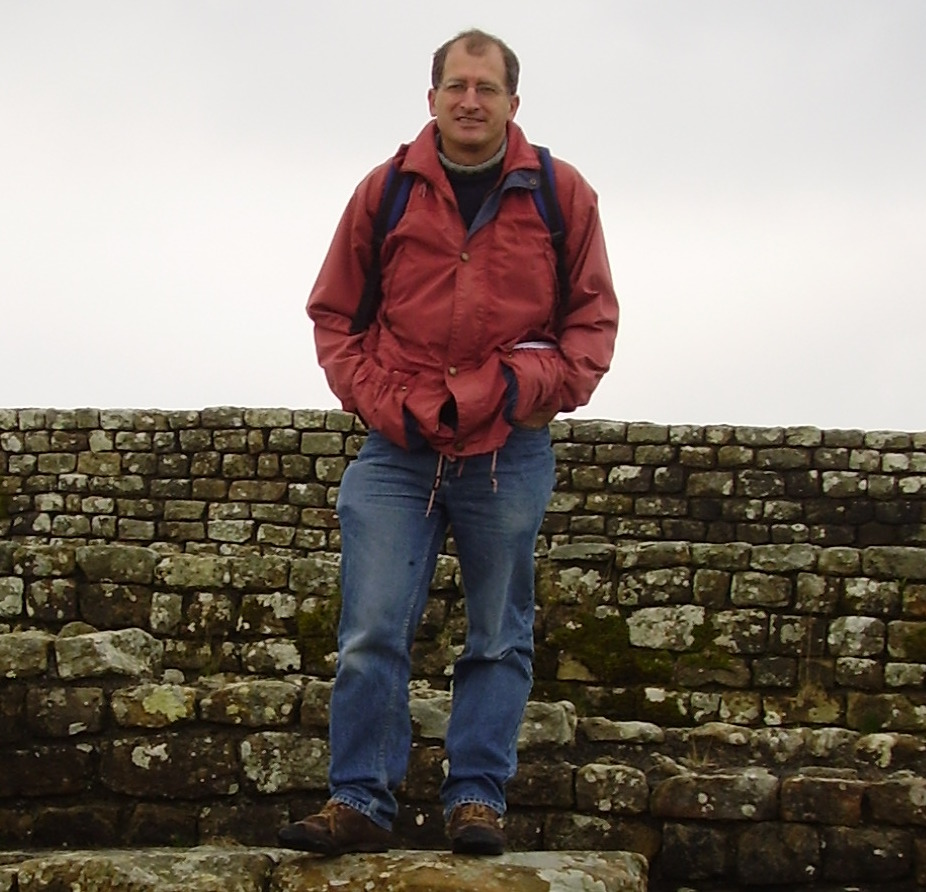
- Professor Mattingly on Hadrian's Wall in 2005
- Born: David John Mattingly; 18 May 1958 (age 68); England

Academic background
- Education: University of Manchester
- Thesis: Tripolitania: A comparative study of a Roman frontier province (1984)
- Doctoral advisor: Barri Jones

Academic work
- Discipline: Ancient history and archaeology
- Sub-discipline: Roman Empire; Roman archaeology; landscape archaeology; Roman North Africa
- Institutions: University of Oxford; University of Michigan; University of Leicester

David John Mattingly, FBA (born 18 May 1958) is an archaeologist and historian of the Roman world. He is currently Professor of Roman Archaeology at the University of Leicester.

== Biography ==
Mattingly's grandfather, Harold Mattingly, was Keeper of the Department of Coins and Medals at the British Museum, and his father, Harold B. Mattingly, was Professor of Ancient History at Leeds University. He received a Bachelor of Arts (BA) in history at the University of Manchester, and later a Doctor of Philosophy (PhD) from the same university, under the supervision of Barri Jones. His doctoral thesis was titled "Tripolitania: A comparative study of a Roman frontier province", and was submitted in 1984. He was then a British Academy Post-doctoral fellow at the Institute of Archaeology, in Oxford until 1989. He was then Assistant Professor at the University of Michigan in the United States. At Leicester University he was first Lecturer, then Reader (1995), and most recently Professor (since 1998).

In 2003, he was elected a Fellow of the British Academy (FBA), the United Kingdom's national academy for the humanities and social sciences.

== Scholarship ==
Mattingly's main area of research is Roman North Africa, especially Libya and Tunisia, though he has also conducted research on Britain, Italy and Jordan. His emphasis has largely been social and economic, and centres on the study of rural settlement, farming technology and the economy; post-colonial approaches to Roman imperialism; Roman military frontiers and the study of native society beyond those frontiers.

He is an active field archaeologist, and is currently directing several expeditions examining the archaeology of the Fazzan and the Ghadames oasis in Libya.

== Published works ==
- Imperialism, Power and Identity: Experiencing the Roman Empire. (2010).
- The Archaeology of Fazzan: Volume 3, Excavations carried out by C M Daniels. (2010) (ed. D. Mattingly).
- Archaeology and Desertification: the Wadi Faynan Landscape Survey, southern Jordan (2007), (with G Barker, D Gilbertson et al.)
- The Archaeology of Fazzan. Volume 2, Site Gazetteer, Pottery and Other Survey Finds (2007), (edited by D Mattingly).
- The Cambridge Dictionary of Classical Civilization (2006). (edited with G Shipley, J Vanderspoel and L Foxhall).
- The Libyan Desert: Natural Resources and Cultural Heritage (2006).(edited with S McLaren, E Savage, Y al-Fasatwi and K Gadgood).
- The Archaeology of Fazzan: Volume 1 (2003) edited by D. Mattingly
- Leptiminus (Lamta): Report no. 2 (2001), (with L Stirling and N Ben Lazreg)
- Leptiminus (Lamta): a Roman port city in Tunisia, Report no. 1.(1992) (with N Ben Lazreg and contributions from others)
- Economies beyond Agriculture in the Classical World (2001) (edited with J Salmon)
- Life, Death and Entertainment in Ancient Rome. (1999), (edited with D Potter)
- Dialogues in Roman Imperialism. Power, Discourse and Discrepant Experience in the Roman Empire (1997), (editor David Mattingly)
- Farming the Desert. The UNESCO Libyan Valleys Archaeological Survey. Volume 2, Gazetteer and Pottery (1996), (edited. DJ Mattingly)
- Tripolitania. Batsford, London (1995)
- Brown, Anthony G.; Meadows, Ian; Turner, Simon D. & Mattingly, David (December 2001). "Roman vineyards in Britain: stratigraphic and palynological data from Wollaston in the Nene Valley, England". Antiquity. 75 (290): 745–757. doi:10.1017/S0003598X00089250.
