= Nicholas Rhodes =

British numismatist

Nicholas G. Rhodes
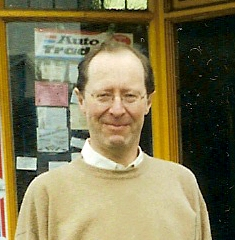
- Nicholas Gervase Rhodes in 2003
- Born: 26 May 1946
- Died: 7 July 2011 (aged 65)
- Education: Trinity College, Cambridge
- Spouse: Deki Rhodes

Nicholas Gervase Rhodes (26 May 1946 – 7 July 2011) was a British numismatist who specialised in the coinages of Asia, particularly those of Himalayan kingdoms and pre-Communist Tibet.

== Biography ==
Rhodes grew up in London, where he went to school until college. He moved to Trinity College, Cambridge to study for a Master's degree in mathematics. Rhodes qualified as an actuary and spent his working life as one. However, coins were his special interest since childhood. He began collecting Asian coins in 1962, and developed a specialist knowledge of the coins of the Himalayan region from Kashmir and Ladakh in the west, through Nepal, Tibet and Bhutan, to Assam and the Hindu states of northeast India. He was an important figure in the Royal Numismatic Society, where he served as Honorary Treasurer (1973–2002), and was elected Honorary Fellow of the RNS in 2002. He was also a founding member of the Oriental Numismatic Society, and was Secretary General of the ONS from 1997. He was also Treasurer of the Bhutan Society in London. In recognition of his knowledge of Nepalese coins, the Nepal Numismatic Society presented an Honorary Membership to Rhodes in 2004.

== Publications ==
- (with Colin R. Bruce II, John S. Deyell and William F. Spengler) The Standard Guide to South Asian Coins and Paper Money since 1556, Iola, Wisconsin, 1981.
- (with Karl Gabrisch and Carlo Valdettaro Pontecorvo de la Rocchetta) The Coinage of Nepal from the Earliest Times until 1911, Royal Numismatic Society (SP21), London, 1989.
- (with Shankar K. Bose) The Coinage of Cooch Behar, Library of Numismatic Studies, Dhubri, 1999.
- (with Shankar K. Bose) The Coinage of Tripura. With notes on the seals, orders, decorations and medals of the state, Library of Numismatic Studies, Kolkata, 2002.
- (with Shankar K. Bose) The Coinage of Assam, I, Pre-Ahom Period, Library of Numismatic Studies, Kolkata, 2003.
- (with Shankar K. Bose) The Coinage of Assam, II, Ahom Period, Library of Numismatic Studies, Kolkata, 2004.
- (with Shankar K. Bose) A History of the Dimasa-Kacharis as seen through coinage, Library of Numismatic Studies, Kolkata and Guwahati, 2006.
- (with Deki Rhodes) A Man of the Frontier. S.W. Laden La (1876-1936). His Life and Times in Darjeeling and Tibet, Library of Numismatic Studies, Kolkata, 2006.
- (with Shankar K. Bose) The Coinage of Jaintiapur, Library of Numismatic Studies, Kolkata, 2010.
- (with Vasilijs V. Mihailovs) The coinage of Samudra Pasai, Felicitas. Essays in Numismatics, Epigraphy & History in honour of Joe Cribb. Mumbai: Reesha Books International, 2011.
- (with Shankar K. Bose) The Coinage of Manipur, Library of Numismatic Studies, Kolkata, 2012.

Articles by N.G.Rhodes which are available in the internet:

- http://www.onsnumis.org/articles/kumaon-rhodes.shtml
- http://www.onsnumis.org/articles/bengal-rhodes.shtml
- http://himalaya.socanth.cam.ac.uk/collections/journals/kailash/pdf/kailash_15_0102_04.pdf
- http://www.thlib.org/static/reprints/kailash/kailash_15_0102_04.pdf
- http://www.thlib.org/static/reprints/jbs/JBS_02_02_03.pdf
- https://web.archive.org/web/20120127080139/http://www.bhutanstudies.org.bt/pubFiles/4.coinage.pdf
- https://web.archive.org/web/20120425083140/http://gorila.netlab.cz/coins/Tibet/ONS_TangkaTibet.pdf
- http://ltwa.tibetanbridges.com/tibet_journal/Tibet_Journal-2010_Autumn/pdf%20files/cut%20coins.pdf

In addition to these publications, Nicholas Rhodes published extensively in the Numismatic Chronicle, the Journal of the Oriental Numismatic Society, the Journal of the British Nepal Society, the Tibet Journal (Dharamsala), Numismatics International Bulletin (Dallas), Kailash (Kathmandu), Mudraa (Kathmandu) and the Journal of Bhutan Studies.
