= Harold B. Mattingly =

British historian

- Born: Harold Braithwaite Mattingly; 1923; Finchley, London, England
- Died: 23 August 2015 (aged 92)
- Relatives: Harold Mattingly (father); David Mattingly (son)

Academic background
- Education: Gonville and Caius College, Cambridge

Academic work
- Discipline: Classical scholar
- Sub-discipline: Classical Greece; Roman Republic; numismatics; epigraphy
- Institutions: University of Nottingham; University of Leeds

Harold Braithwaite Mattingly (1923 – 23 August 2015) was a British historian of Roman civilization, epigrapher and numismatist who was Professor of Ancient History at the University of Leeds.

== Biography ==
Mattingly was born in Finchley, London, the son of the historian and numismatist Harold Mattingly. He attended The Leys School in Cambridge and took a double first in Classics at Gonville and Caius College, Cambridge in 1948. He subsequently held a Craven Scholarship from 1948 to 1950, writing a thesis on the Roman Imperial Senate.

He married Erica Stuart (died 2008), an artist and potter, with whom he had had three children, including David Mattingly, Professor of Roman Archaeology at the University of Leicester.

== Academic career ==
In 1950 Mattingly became a Lecturer, later Reader, in Ancient History at the University of Nottingham. In 1970 he was appointed Professor of Ancient History at the University of Leeds. His research throughout his career, according to his Leeds obituary, "focused on Classical Greece and the Roman Republic and on numismatic and epigraphic problems". He retired from his chair at Leeds in 1987 with the title Emeritus Professor.

Mattingly was President of the Royal Numismatic Society from 1999 to 2004.

== Death ==
Professor Mattingly died on 23 August 2015, aged 92.

== Publications ==
- 2012 - Coins and travels in Greece : an introduction to the coins of ancient Greece with reminiscences of visits by numismatist Harold Mattingly (with Joanna Mattingly and Stephen Tyrrell)
- 2007 - From coins to history : selected numismatic studies
- 1996 - The Athenian empire restored : epigraphic and historical studies
- 1969 - Notes on some Roman republican moneyers
- 1963 - Various numismatic notes
- 1960 - Naevius and the Metelli
