= Barri Jones =

British archaeologist

Geraint Dyfed Barri Jones
- Born: 4 April 1936; England
- Died: 16 July 1999 (aged 63)
- Citizenship: United Kingdom
- Education: Oxford University
- Known for: Excavation of Roman North Africa and Aerial Photography in archaeology.
- Scientific career
- Fields: History; Archaeology
- Workplaces: University of Manchester
- Notable students: David Mattingly

Geraint Dyfed Barri Jones FSA (4 April 1936 – 16 July 1999) was a classical scholar and archaeologist.

Born in St Helens to Welsh-speaking parents, he attended High Wycombe Royal Grammar School (where his father was the senior modern languages master and his mother also taught) from 1947–54, and won a Welsh Foundation Scholarship to read classics at Jesus College, Oxford.

== Fieldwork and excavations ==
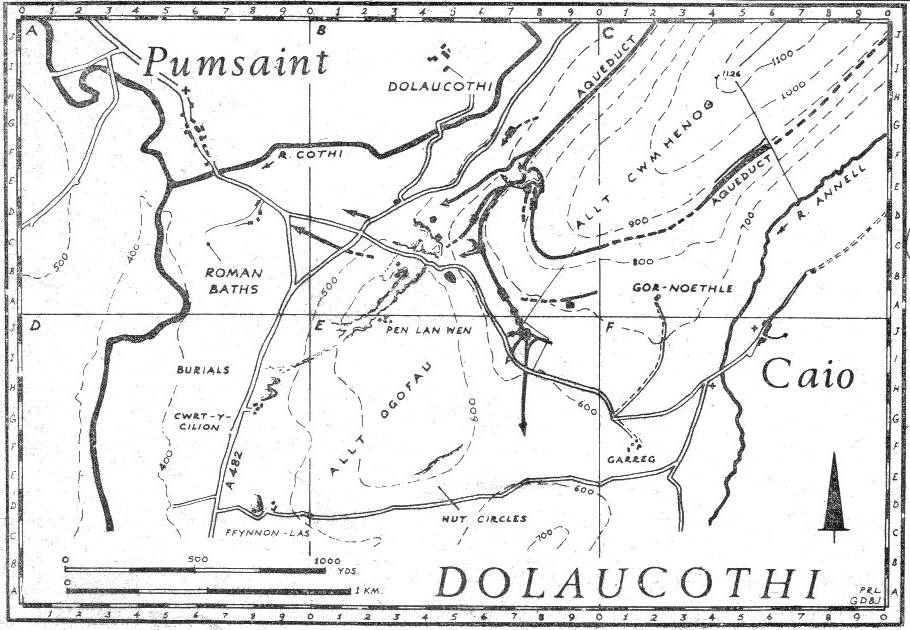
Map of the gold mine

Jones achieved a great deal as a young man, identifying new archaeological sites while a teenager. He was elected to the Rome Scholarship for Classical Studies in 1959. From 1959 to 1962, Jones took part in the South Etruria Survey directed by John Bryan Ward-Perkins of the British School at Rome. After receiving his D.Phil. from Oxford, Jones continued to work in Italy, analyzing aerial photographs of Apulia, leading to important discoveries at Foggia. In 1964, he took an appointment at the University of Manchester. While there, he conducted numerous field surveys and excavations of Roman sites in Lancashire, Cheshire, Cumbria and Derbyshire. He also worked at Dolaucothi, a Roman gold mine in Carmarthenshire, South Wales, his research there with Dr Peter R Lewis transforming knowledge about this unique site. He excavated the fort nearby, as well as at Carmarthen.

== Libya ==
Jones worked in North Africa for the Society for Libyan Studies, now the British Institute for Libyan and Northern African Studies, discovering the city of Hadrianopolis by tracing its aqueduct. He was very much involved in rescue archaeology throughout his career. Jones was attracted to frontier areas, an interest reflected in his work. Among his students were John Lloyd, John Little, Nicholas Higham and David Mattingly.

== Publications ==
- Jones G.D.B., Blakey, I.J. and MacPherson, E.C.F. 1960. Dolaucothi: the Roman aqueduct, Bulletin of the Board of Celtic Studies 19: 71-84 and plates III-V.
- Jones, G.D.B and Higham, N. 1985. The Carvetii. Sutton
- Jones, G.D.B. and Mattingly, D.J. 1990. An Atlas of Roman Britain. Oxford: Oxbow
- Jones, G.D.B. and Wooliscroft, D. 2001. Hadrian's Wall from the Air History Press.
- Lewis, P.R. and G.D.B. Jones. 1969. The Dolaucothi gold mines, I: the surface evidence, The Antiquaries Journal, 49: 244–72.
- Lewis, P.R. and G.D.B. Jones. 1970. Roman gold-mining in north-west Spain, Journal of Roman Studies 60: 169–85.
