= Helen Farquhar =

British numismatist

Helen Laura Farquhar
- Born: 8 November 1859; Brackley
- Died: 3 January 1953 (aged 93); London
- Parents: Harvie Morton Farquhar (father); Louisa Harriet Ridley-Colbourne (mother)
- Relatives: Florence Farquhar (sister), Ernest Farquhar (brother), Isabel Farquhar (sister), Alfred Farquhar (brother), John Henry Ponsonby (brother-in-law), Violet Louise Clive nee Ponsonby (niece), Richard Ponsonby-Fane (nephew)

Helen Laura Farquhar (1859 – 1953) was a British numismatist and a founder member of the British Numismatic Society in 1903. Farquhar served on the British Numismatic Society Council many times from 1910-1946 and was Vice-President at various times 1912-1953. Farquhar specialised in British numismatics, especially Stuart portraiture and the Touch pieces associated with the King's Evil (scrofula). Farquhar wrote prolifically on these subjects, particularly in the British Numismatic Journal where she published articles in every volume from 1905-1930.

== Biography ==
Farquhar was born in Brackley, Northamptonshire, in 1859 and grew up in London. Her parents were Harvie Morton Farquhar and Louisa Harriet Ridley-Colbourne. Harvie Morton Farquhar was a descendant of the Farquhar baronets and a director of Messrs Herries, Farquhar & Co, which was later acquired by Lloyds Bank. Farquhar lived in Chelsea during the 1860s and 1870s where she was educated by a governess. From at least 1901 Farquhar lived with her sister Isabel Farquhar in Belgrave Square. She died at the age of 94 at 6 Lowndes Street on 3 January 1953.

Farquhar was a prolific correspondent and archive material is held by the National Archives, the Wellcome Collection, and the British Museum.

Farquhar either donated (during her lifetime) or bequeathed her collection of coins, medals, badges, and touch-pieces, chiefly of the Stuart period, to the British Museum.

== Honours ==
Farquhar was awarded the John Sanford Saltus Medal of the British Numismatic Society for 1911 at the February 1912 meeting of the Society for her work on Stuart coins and medals.

Farquhar was awarded the Medal of the Royal Numismatic Society in 1931; the first female recipient of the Medal. Farquhar was made an honorary member of the British Numismatic Society in 1950.

Farquhar was a fellow of the Royal Historical Society.

== Collections ==
Farquhar collected coins and medals associated with her scholarly interests in the Stuart period. She used these collections in presentations to the British Numismatic Society and donated or bequeathed her collection to the British Museum.

== Family ==
Farquhar lived with her sister Isabel for most of her adult life.

== Publications ==
=== Articles ===
- "Portraiture of the Stuarts on the Royalist Badges" in British Numismatic Journal 2 (1905) 243-290
- "Patterns and medals bearing the legend IACOBVS III or IACOBVS VIII" in British Numismatic Journal 3 (1906) 229-270
- "Portraiture of our Tudor monarchs on their coins and medals" in British Numismatic Journal 4 (1907) 79-143
- "Portraiture of Our Stuart Monarchs on their Coins and Medals" in British Numismatic Journal 5 (1908) 145-262
- "Portraiture of Our Stuart Monarchs on their Coins and Medals. Part II: James II" in British Numismatic Journal 6 (1909) 213-285
- "Portraiture of our Stuart monarchs on their coins and medals. Part III: William and Mary" in British Numismatic Journal 7 (1910) 199-267
- "Portraiture of our Stuart monarchs on their coins and medals, Part IV: William III" in British Numismatic Journal 8 (1911) 207-273
- "Portraiture of our Stuart monarchs on their coins and medals: Part V, William III, continued" in British Numismatic Journal 9 (1912) 237-294
- "Portraiture of our Stuart monarchs on their coins and medals. Part VI: Anne" in British Numismatic Journal 10 (1913-1914) 199-266
- "Portraiture of our Stuart monarchs on their coins and medals. Part VII: Anne continued" in British Numismatic Journal 11 (1915) 219-287
- "Silver Counters of the Seventeenth Century" in The Numismatic Chronicle 16 (1916) 133-193
- "Royal charities. Part I: angels as healing-pieces for the king's evil" in British Numismatic Journal 12 (1916) 39-135
- "Concerning some Roettiers Dies" in The Numismatic Chronicle 17 (1917) 126-165
- "Royal charities. Part II: touchpieces for the king's evil" in British Numismatic Journal 13 (1917) 95-163
- "Royal charities. Part III (continuation of) touchpieces for the king's evil. James II to William III" in British Numismatic Journal 14 (1918) 89-120
- "Royal charities. Part IV (conclusion of) Touchpiece's for the king's evil" in British Numismatic Journal 15 (1919-1920) 141-184
- "Royal Charities (Second Series)" in British Numismatic Journal 16 (1921-1922) 195-228
- "A series of portrait plaques in thin silver, struck in Stuart times, technically called shells or clichés" in British Numismatic Journal 16 (1921-1922) 229-246
- "Royal Charities (Second Series) Part II" in British Numismatic Journal 17 (1923-1924) 133-164
- "An Emergenc Coinage in Ireland" in British Numismatic Journal 17 (1923-1924) 165-169
- "Some portrait-medals struck between 1745 and 1752 for Prince Charles Edward" in British Numismatic Journal 17 (1923-1924) 171-225
- "The Shrewsbury Medal" in British Numismatic Journal 18 (1925-1926) 125-134
- "Royal Charities (Second Series) Part IV" in British Numismatic Journal 19 (1927-1928) 109-129
- "A Lost Coinage in the Channel Islands" in The Numismatic Chronicle 8 (1928) 199-212
- "Royal Charities (Second Series) Part V" in British Numismatic Journal 20 (1929-1930) 215-150
- "The Forlorn Hope Medal of Charles I" in The Numismatic Chronicle 10 (1930) 316-329
- "Thomas Simon, "One of our Chief Geavers"" in The Numismatic Chronicle 12 (1932) 274-310
