= Glasgow Archaeological Society =

- Formation: 1856; 170 years ago
- Founded at: Glasgow
- Type: NGO
- Purpose: Promoting the study of archaeology, particularly in Glasgow and the West of Scotland.
- Headquarters: Glasgow
- Location: Scotland
- President: Dr Natasha Ferguson
- Website: glasarchsoc.org.uk

The Glasgow Archaeological Society is an archaeological society in Glasgow, Scotland, that was established in 1856. Its current president is Dr Natasha Ferguson.

The society is known for its Dalrymple Lectures, co-hosted with the University of Glasgow. Previous lecturers and topics have included:

- Professor Emmanuel Anati on "Prehistoric rock Art"
- Professor Rosemary Cramp on "Northern Aspects of British Archaeology"
- Professor Vassos Karageorghis on "Prehistoric Cypriot Archaeology"
- Sir Barry Cunliffe on "Continent cut off by fog: Just how insular is Britain?"
- Professor Martin Millett on "Towards an archaeology of the Roman Empire"
- Professor Ian Hodder on "Thing Theory: Towards an integrated archaeological perspective"
- Professor Richard Hodges on "Archaeology and the making of the Middle Ages"
- Professor David Breeze on "The frontiers of the Roman Empire"
- Professor Roberta Gilchrist on "Medieval Lives: Archaeology and the Life Course"

Its journals, Transactions of the Glasgow Archaeological Society (1859 to 1967) and the Glasgow Archaeological Journal (1969 to 1991), are now published by Edinburgh University Press as the Scottish Archaeological Journal.
