= Scottish Archaeological Journal =

Academic journal

- Discipline: Archaeology
- Language: English

Publication details
- Former names: Transactions of the Glasgow Archaeological Society; Glasgow Archaeological Journal
- History: 1859–present
- Publisher: Edinburgh University Press on behalf of the Glasgow Archaeological Society

Standard abbreviations
- ISO 4: Scott. Archaeol. J.

Indexing
- Scottish Archaeological Journal
- ISSN: 1471-5767 (print); 1755-2028 (web)
- Glasgow Archaeological Journal
- ISSN: 0305-8980 (print); 2053-7824 (web)
- Transactions of the Glasgow Archaeological Society
- ISSN: 2398-5755 (print); 2398-9548 (web)

Links
- Journal homepage

The Scottish Archaeological Journal is a peer-reviewed academic journal of the archaeology of Scotland. It is published by Edinburgh University Press and was previously known as the Transactions of the Glasgow Archaeological Society (1859 to 1967) and the Glasgow Archaeological Journal (1969 to 1991).

== See also ==
- Glasgow Archaeological Society
