= Harold Mattingly =

British classical scholar (1884–1964)

- Born: 24 December 1884
- Died: 26 January 1964 (aged 79)
- Relatives: Harold B. Mattingly (son); David Mattingly (grandson)

Academic background
- Education: Gonville and Caius College, Cambridge

Academic work
- Discipline: Classical scholar
- Sub-discipline: Art history; numismatics; Roman coins; Etruscan coins; Tacitus
- Institutions: British Museum

Harold Mattingly (24 December 1884 – 26 January 1964) was a British classical scholar, specialising in art history and numismatics. His interests included the history of Ancient Rome, Etruscan and Roman currency, and the Roman historian Tacitus.

== Early life and education ==
Harold Mattingly was born in Sudbury, Suffolk on 24 December 1884. From 1896 to 1903, he was educated at The Leys School, a private school in Cambridge. He then studied classics at Gonville and Caius College, Cambridge, where he achieved a double first and graduated with a Bachelor of Arts (BA) degree in 1907.

== Career ==
In 1910 he joined the Department of Printed Books of the British Museum.

In 1909 and 1914, showing his interest in Roman history, he published two books on the subject.

During the First World War, worked for the Postal Censorship Bureau. At the close of hostilities he returned to his work at the British Museum and his attention carried him towards the study of antique coins.

From 1912, Harold Mattingly was a member of the Royal Numismatic Society.

He completely revised the chronology used for the study of Roman coins. He was awarded the medal of the Royal Numismatic Society in 1941.

He also translated Tacitus' works Agricola and Germania. These two translations were published together in 1948 by Penguin Books under the title Tacitus on Britain and Germany. 27,000 copies of this book were sold in that year. It was reprinted in 1951, 1954, 1960, 1962, 1964 and 1965. The second edition, revised by S A Handford, was published in 1970 under the title The Agricola and the Germania. The book was revised again in 2009 by J B Rives. Mattingly's translation is considered one of the best and is still used (albeit in edited format) today.

== Personal life ==
His son, Harold B. Mattingly (1923–2015) was also a celebrated numismatist, and President of the Royal Numismatic Society 1999-2004.

Mattingly died on 26 January 1964 at the age of 79 in Chesham, Buckinghamshire.

== Publications ==
- Outlines of Ancient History, from the earliest times to the fall of the Roman Empire in the West, A.D. 476. Cambridge: Cambridge University Press, 1914.
- Coins of the Roman Empire in the British Museum, 6 volumes. London: British Museum, 1923-1963.
- (with Edward Allen Sydenham), The Roman Imperial Coinage, 10 volumes. London: Spink, 1923-1994.
- Roman Coins from the Earliest Times to the Fall of the Western Empire. London: Methuen, 1928.
- The Pirates, and three other Latin plays on Caesar's life. London: Methuen, 1928.
- The Date of the Roman Denarius and Other Landmarks in Early Roman Coinage. London: Humphrey Milford, 1933.
- L'Impero di Roma nelle monete della Britannia e nelle raccolte e negli studi numismatici inglesi. Rome: Istituto di Studi Romani, 1939.
- Some New Studies of the Roman Republican Coinage. Proceedings of the British Academy : pp. 239–285, 1953.
- Roman Imperial Civilisation. London: Edward Arnold, 1957.

== Notes and references ==
- "Dr Harold Mattingly, Distinguished Numismatist", The Times, 1 February 1964, p 10
- R A G Carson, "Harold Mattingly 1884-1964" (1965) Numismatic Chronicle and Journal of the Royal Numismatic Society, 7th Series, vol 5, p 239
