= Christopher Evelyn Blunt =

British merchant banker and numismatist

- Born: 16 July 1904; London, England
- Died: 20 November 1987 (aged 83)
- Occupations: merchant banker and numismatist

Christopher Evelyn Blunt, OBE, FBA, FSA (16 July 1904 – 20 November 1987) was a British merchant banker and numismatist.

== Life ==
Blunt was born in London, the second son of the Reverend Arthur Stanley Vaughan Blunt and of Hilda Violet Blunt, née Master. His brothers were the writer Wilfrid Jasper Walter Blunt and the art historian and spy Anthony Frederick Blunt.

Blunt was educated at Marlborough College but, unlike his brothers, did not attend university. In 1924 he joined the banking house Higginson & Co. (later part of Hill Samuel), becoming partner in 1947. During World War II, Blunt was successively attached to the General Headquarters of the British Expeditionary Force and Supreme Headquarters Allied Expeditionary Force. He was mentioned in dispatches in 1940, appointed OBE and Officer of the Legion of Merit in 1945. He retired in 1946 with the rank of colonel.

Blunt was a major numismatist. He was director of the British Numismatic Society from 1935 and its president from 1946 and 1950, and the president of the Royal Numismatic Society between 1956 and 1961. He was the general editor of the Sylloge of Coins of the British Isles from 1956 to 1987.

He was elected a Fellow of the Society of Antiquaries of London (FSA) in 1936 and FBA in 1965.
