= Michael Metcalf =

British numismatist (1933–2018)

- Born: 8 May 1933
- Died: 25 October 2018 (aged 85)

Academic background
- Education: St John's College, Cambridge

Academic work
- Institutions: Ashmolean Museum; University of Oxford

David Michael Metcalf (8 May 1933 – 25 October 2018) was a British academic and numismatist. He was the director of the Heberden Coin Room of the Ashmolean Museum, a fellow of Wolfson College and Professor of Numismatics at the University of Oxford. He held the degrees of MA, DPhil and DLitt from Oxford.

== Early life and education ==
Metcalf was born on 8 May 1933 in Newcastle, England. He studied geography at St John's College, Cambridge followed by a doctorate on medieval coinage in the Balkans supervised by Philip Grierson.

== Academic career ==
Metcalf's primary focus was on the early and high Middle Ages, Byzantine Empire, the Crusader states and the Balkans. He worked at the Heberden Coin Room of the Ashmolean Museum in Oxford from 1971 to 1999 and was the director of the Heberden Coin Room from 1982 to 1999. He was appointed as Professor of Numismatics at the University of Oxford in 1996 and retired in 1998; he was also a Fellow of Wolfson College, Oxford, from 1982 to 1998.

He served as president of the Royal Numismatic Society from 1994 to 1999 and led the editorial board of its journal The Numismatic Chronicle from 1974 to 1984.

In the 1960s Metcalf published articles arguing that the number of coins circulating in early medieval Europe was much higher than believed previously. This led to arguments, including one reported in the Times in 1966, but was supported by metal detector finds in the 1980s.

== Personal life ==
In 1962, Metcalf married Dorothy Uren, a teacher, who died in 2018. They had three children.

He died on 25 October 2018 at the age of 85.

== Honours ==
- 1983 – John Sanford Saltus Gold Medal by the British Numismatic Society
- 1987 – Medal of the Royal Numismatic Society
- 1991 – Huntington Medal of the American Numismatic Society
- 2008 – Meshorer Numismatic Prize of the Israel Museum
- 2008 – Derek Allen Prize of the British Academy

== Selected publications ==
- The Coinage of South Germany in the Thirteenth Century (Spink, 1961).
- Coinage in the Balkans (Institute for Balkan Studies, 1965).
- (Co-authored with Julia M. Merrick and Lynette Kaye) Studies in the Composition of Early Medieval Coins (Corbitt & Hunter, 1968).
- The Origins of the Anastasian Currency Reforms (Adolf M. Hakkert, 1969).
- The Copper Coinage of Thessalonica under Justinian I (Verlag der Österreichischen Akademie der Wissenschaften, 1976).
- Coinage in South-Eastern Europe, 820–1396, 2nd ed. (Spink, 1979).
- (Co-authored with W. A. Oddy) Metallurgy in Numismatics (Royal Numismatic Society, 1980).
- Coinage of the Crusades and the Latin East in the Ashmolean Museum, Oxford (Royal Numismatic Society and Society for the Study of the Crusades and the Latin East, 1983).
- Thrymsas and Sceattas in the Ashmolean Museum, Oxford, 3 vols. (Royal Numismatic Society and Ashmolean Museum, 1993-4).
- The Silver Coinage of Cyprus, 1285–1382 (Cyprus Research Centre, 1996).
- An Atlas of Anglo-Saxon and Norman Coin Finds, 973–1086 (Royal Numismatic Society, 1998).
- The White Bezants and Deniers of Cyprus, 1192–1285 (Cyprus Research Centre, 1998).
- The Gros, Sixains, and Cartzias of Cyprus: 1382–1489 (Cyprus Research Centre, 2000).
- Byzantine Cyprus: 491–1191 (Cyprus Research Centre, 2009).

== See also ==
- Ashmolean Museum
