= C. H. V. Sutherland =

British numismatist

C. H. V. Sutherland CBE
- Born: Carol Humphrey Vivian Sutherland; 5 May 1908; Merton Park, Surrey, England
- Died: 14 May 1986 (aged 78)
- Other names: Humphrey Sutherland
- Occupation: Numismatist

Carol Humphrey Vivian Sutherland, CBE (5 May 1908 – 14 May 1986), also known as Humphrey Sutherland, was an English numismatist.

Sutherland was born in Merton Park, Surrey. He was the younger brother of the painter Graham Sutherland. He was educated at Westminster School and Christ Church, Oxford. In 1932 he became an assistant keeper in the Heberden Coin Room at the Ashmolean Museum, and from 1939 he also lectured in numismatics at the University of Oxford. He was appointed keeper of the coin room in 1957 and retired in 1975. He was awarded the medal of the Royal Numismatic Society in 1954.

He was appointed Commander of the Order of the British Empire (CBE) in 1970.
