= British Numismatic Society =

UK learned society

Logo of the British Numismatic Society

The British Numismatic Society exists to promote the study and understanding of British numismatics. The Society was founded in 1903, focusing on all forms of coinage, tokens, banknotes and medals relating to the British Isles and former parts of the British Empire. The society promotes the understanding of numismatics through holding regular lectures and meetings as well as producing a number of publications. These include the British Numismatic Journal, the major journal for British numismatics.

== Publications ==
Its principal publication is the British Numismatic Journal (BNJ), published from 1903. Back issues of BNJ are free to read online, apart from the most recent three years' editions.

== Library ==
The BNS has the library combined and integrated with the library of the Royal Numismatic Society and located at the Warburg Institute.

== Membership ==
Becoming a member of the British Numismatic Society is open to all for an annual £32 fee that covers membership. Members have access to the Society's literature on coins and receive a copy of its annual journal.

== Awards ==
- Sanford Saltus Gold Medal
- Blunt Prize
- North Book Prize

== See also ==
- List of presidents of the British Numismatic Society
