= Royal Numismatic Society =

Organization

- RNS logo
- Formation: 1836
- Type: Learned society
- Registration no.: 221850
- Legal status: Charity
- Purpose: Historical Study and Research
- Headquarters: London, England, UK
- Activities: Research, publications, lectures, events
- Collections: Library, archives
- President: Martin Allen
- Website: numismatics.org.uk

The Royal Numismatic Society (RNS), formerly Numismatic Society of London, is a learned society and charity based in London, United Kingdom, which promotes research into all branches of numismatics.

== Membership ==
Foremost collectors and researchers, both professional and amateur, in the field of numismatics are amongst the fellows of the Society. They must be elected to the Society by the Council. The Numismatic Chronicle is the annual publication of the Royal Numismatic Society.

== History ==
The society was founded in 1836 as the Numismatic Society of London and received the title "Royal Numismatic Society" from Edward VII by royal charter in 1904. The history of the Society was presented as a series of annual Presidential addresses by R.A. Carson – these were published in the Numismatic Chronicle between 1975 and 1978. The fifth and latest instalment was written to mark the 150th anniversary of the Society in 1986, and the full text was published in 1986 as A History of the Royal Numismatic Society, 1936-1986 (London, 1986).

The society has had several royal patrons, including King Edward VII and Queen Elizabeth II.

== Publications ==
The society has an annual journal, The Numismatic Chronicle, and publishes a book series known as the Special Publications.

== Awards of the Royal Numismatic Society ==
- Honorary Fellowship
- The Medal of the Royal Numismatic Society
- The Parkes Weber Prize
- The Lhotka Prize
- The Samir Shamma Prize for Islamic Numismatics
- The Gilljam Prize for Third-Century Numismatics

== See also ==
- List of presidents of the Royal Numismatic Society
- List of special publications of the Royal Numismatic Society
