= Coinage from Maximinus Thrax to Aemilianus =

Imperial Roman coinage from 235 to 253 A.D

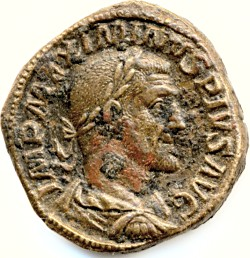
Right-facing laureate head of Maximinus Thrax, first emperor of the period of barracks emperors.

Coinage from Maximinus Thrax to Aemilianus is understood as the set of coins issued by Rome during the reigns of more than a dozen emperors of the first part of the period called military anarchy, succeeding Severus Alexander (last of the Severan dynasty), from 235 to 253: Maximinus Thrax (235–238), Gordian I (238), Gordian II (238), Pupienus (238), Balbinus (238), Gordian III (238–244), Philip the Arab (244–249), Decius with his sons Herennius Etruscus and Hostilian (249–251), Trebonianus Gallus with his son Volusianus (251–253), and finally Aemilianus (253).

== Historical context ==
When Alexander Severus (the last heir of the Severan dynasty) was killed at the instigation of General Maximinus Thrax, he was succeeded by the latter in 235. Three years later, Maximinus was killed by his own troops, Legio II Parthica, encamped near Aquileia in May 238. He was succeeded in a few months by Gordian I (who died by suicide), Gordian II (who died in battle), Pupienus and Balbinus (two senators slaughtered by the Praetorian Guard), and finally, Gordian III, who reigned until 244 but was probably assassinated at the behest of the Praetorian prefect, Philip the Arab. Philip, who succeeded Gordian on the imperial throne, fell in battle against his rival Decius in 249, who in turn died along with his son Herennius Etruscus, who would succeed him, in the battle of Abrittus against the Goths in 251.

Decius was succeeded by Gaius Vibius Trebonianus Gallus, who associated with the throne first Decius' youngest son, Hostilianus, (in 251), and then his son, Volusianus. The latter also perished in battle at the hands of soldiers at the instigation of the future emperor Aemilianus. Aemilianus did not last more than three months, also dying at the hands of his own soldiers near Spoleto.

== Maximinus Thrax ==
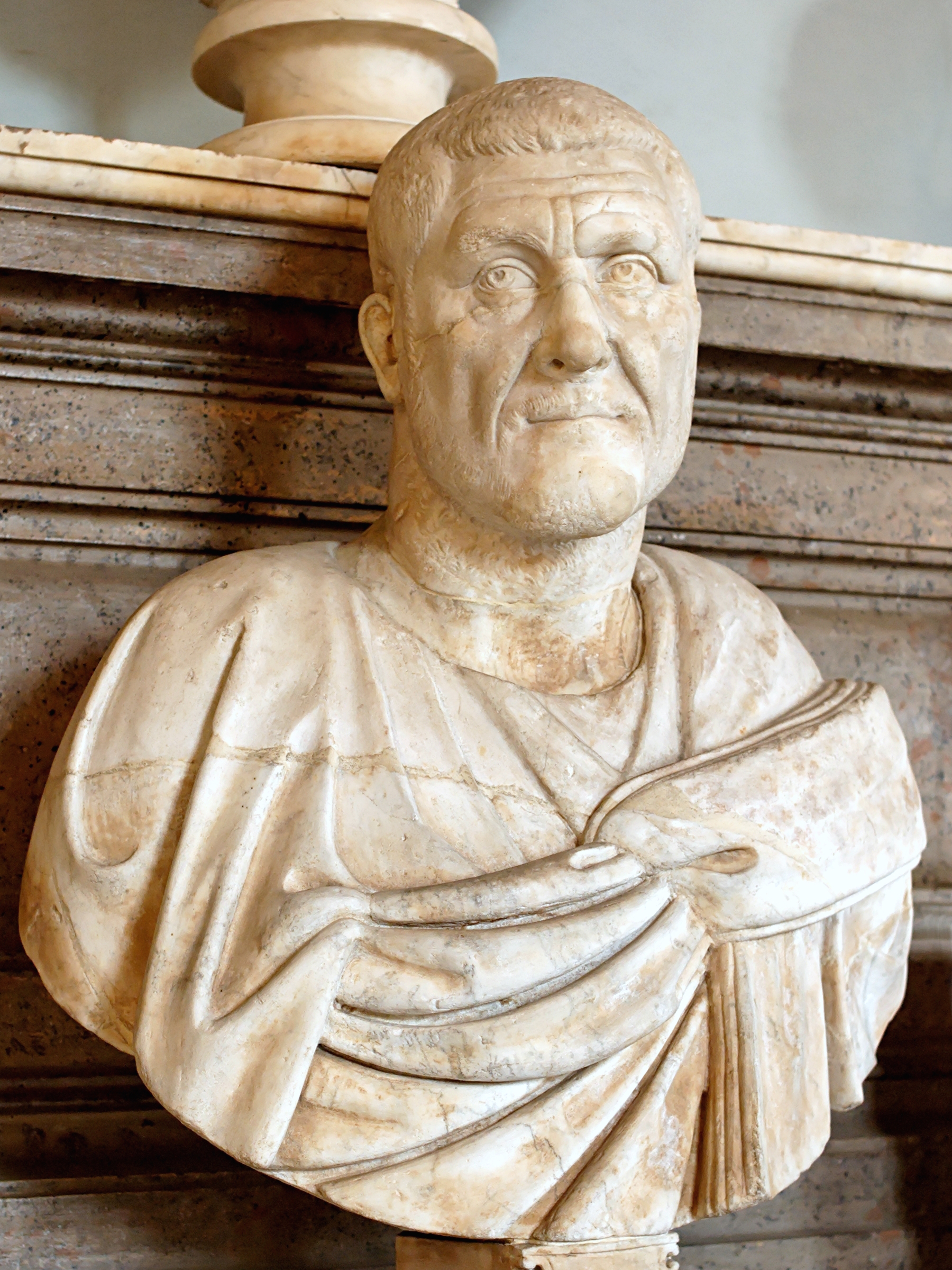
Emperor Maximinus Thrax, who began the turbulent period of military anarchy, which ended only with Diocletian fifty years later.

Maximinus Thrax was the first barbarian to attain the imperial purple, thanks to the consent of the legions, having been born without Roman citizenship, and without being a senator. He was also the first emperor never to have set foot in Rome, as he spent his three-year reign engaged in military campaigns; and the first emperor-soldier of the third century. He died near Aquileia following a sedition of his troops.

Imperial title	Number of times	Date
Tribunicia potestas	4 years	First in March 20, 235; then renovated each year at December 10.
Consul	once	year 236.
Victory titles		Germanicus Maximus in 235, Dacicus Maximus in 236/7, and Sarmaticus maximus in 237.
Imperator	6 times	first at the time of the assumption of imperial power on March 20, 235, then again in 235 (2nd time) and 237 (3rd to 6th time).
Other titles		Pontifex Maximus, Pater Patriae, Pius, and Felix in 235.

=== Main themes ===
==== Maximinus, his son Caesar and his wife Paulina ====
Maximinus was acclaimed Imperator, according to the version in the Historia Augusta, only after Alexander was killed. It was the first time this occurred for a military man, not yet a senator, moreover without any decree of the senate. He was also given as a colleague in the empire, his son Gaius Julius Verus Maximus, giving him the title princeps iuventutis ("prince of youth"). At the same time, his deceased wife, Caecilia Paulina, was deified. The choice of legionaries was later also confirmed by the Praetorian Guard and ratified by the Roman Senate, which, however, frowned upon an emperor of barbarian origin.

Maximinus and his son Caesar
Picture	Value	Obverse	Reverse	Date	Weight and diameter	Catalog
	denarius	IVL VERVS MAXIMVS CAES, head toward right, drapery on shoulders	Pietas AVG, a lituus, a knife, a jug, a simpulum and a sprinkler	minted in 235/238	3.06 grams	RIC Maximinus Trax, IVb, 1; BMCRE 118; RSC 1.
	denarius	DIVA PAVLINA, head covered with a veil toward right, draped over shoulders	CONSECRATIO, a peacock in front with head toward the left and tail spread	minted in 235	3.36 grams	RIC Maximinus Trax, IV 1; BMCRE 135 (Maximinus); RSC 1.

==== Military campaigns against Germans and Sarmatians (235-237) ====
The pressure of the barbarians along the northern frontiers and the simultaneous pressure of the Sasanians in the East had spread the feeling that the empire was encircled by its enemies. The tools of traditional diplomacy, used since the time of Augustus and based on the threat of using force and the fomenting of internal dissensions among the various hostile tribes to keep them engaged against each other, now showed little effect.

Immediate recourse to force was necessary, deploying tactically superior armies capable of intercepting every possible avenue of invasion by the barbarians as quickly as possible; however, the strategy was made difficult by having to garrison immense stretches of frontier with mostly sparse military contingents.

To this end between 235 and 236 the emperor conducted his first campaign against the Germanic federation of Alemanni, using Mogontiacum as his "headquarters" and crossing the imperial borders in the Taunus area. Maximinus believed that it was a priority of the empire to wage "anti-Germanic" warfare, he continued to fight the Alemanni, succeeding not only in repelling their incursions along the Limes Germanicus but also in penetrating Germania. The Roman senate honored him with the title Germanicus Maximus, and coins celebrated his Salus Augusta and Pax Augusti titles.

He went, then, to Pannonia, at Sirmium, for the winter of 235/236 and led new campaigns against the Iazyges Sarmatians of the Tisza plain, who had tried to cross the Danube after about fifty years of peace along their frontiers, and the neighboring Quadians (as some inscriptions found in the Brigetio area seem to testify). He had a dream: that of emulating Marcus Aurelius and conquering free Greater Germania. His headquarters, placed at Sirmium, were in the center of the Pannonia Inferior and Dacia front. Thus the Historia Augusta reports:

Having completed the campaigns in Germania [against the Alemanni], Maximinus went to Sirmium, preparing an expedition against the Sarmatians, and planning to subdue to Rome the northern regions as far as the Ocean.

— Historia Augusta, The Two Maximines, 13.3

Military campaigns in the north
Picture	Value	Obverse	Reverse	Date	Weight and diameter	Catalog
	denarius	IMP MAXIMINVS PIVS AVG, head toward right with laurel, drapery on shoulders	VICT-ORI-A AVG, Victory walking to the left, holding a crown and a palm	235	20 mm, 3.16 grams	RIC Maximinus Trax, IV 16; BMCRE 25–6 var.; RSC 99.
	denarius	IMP MAXIMINVS PIVS AVG, head toward right with laurel, drapery on shoulders	PAX AUGUSTI, goddess Pax standing facing left, holding an olive branch and a scepter askew	236	20 mm, 2.95 grams	RIC Maximinus Trax, IV 12; RSC 31a.
	sestertius	MAXIMINVS PIVS AVG GERM, head toward right with laurel, drapery on shoulders	VICTO-RIA GERMANICA, S(enatus) C(consultum) on the sides, Victory standing to the left, holding a crown and a palm; a prisoner on the left at her feet	236	28 mm, 18.44 grams	RIC Maximinus Trax, IV 90; BMCRE 194; Cohen 109.
	sestertius	MAXIMINVS PIVS AVG GERM, head toward right with laurel, drapery on shoulders	SALVS AVGVSTI, the goddess Salus seated toward the left, holding a patera from which a serpent feeds, rising from an altar to the left; S(enatus) C(consultum) in exergue	236 (mint of ancient Rome, 3rd issue)	30 mm, 21.53 grams	RIC Maximinus Trax, IV 85; BMCRE 175–6; Banti 24.
	denarius	MAXIMINVS PIVS AVG GERM, head toward right with laurel, drapery on shoulders	P M TR P III COS P P, Emperor Maximinus Thrax standing between two legionary banners, raising his right hand and holding a scepter	237	3.08 grams	RIC Maximinus Trax, IV 5; BMCRE 161; RSC 64.
	sestertius	MAXIMINVS PIVS AVG GERM, head toward right with laurel, drapery on shoulders	P M TR P IIII COS P P, Emperor Maximinus Thrax standing between two legionary banners, raising his right hand and holding a scepter	238	21.19 grams	RIC Maximinus Trax, 40; Pink III, pg. 21; cf. Banti 19/20 (obv./rev.); BMCRE 221; Cohen 71.

==== Army loyalty, donativum and congiarium to provincials ====
Once rebellion broke out in Africa against Maximinus Thrax, Gordian I, hastened to send numerous messages to those whom he considered the wealthiest citizens of Rome, as well as to the Senate and people of Rome itself, promising great clemency for those who cooperated; to the soldiers (Praetorian Guard and Legio II Parthica), a donativum was distributed; to the people of Rome a new distribution of money. Maximinus did the same, especially to the troops still loyal to him and the provincials.

Maximinus and the army: donativum
Picture	Value	Obverse	Reverse	Date	Weight and diameter	Catalog
	denarius	IMP MAXIMINVS PIVS AVG, laureate head of Maximinus Thrax toward right, bust with cuirass	FIDES MILITVM, Fides standing facing left, holding a vexillum resting on the ground in each of her hands	236	20 mm, 3.17 grams	RIC IV 7a; RSC 7a.
	sestertius	IMP MAXIMINVS PIVS AVG, laureate head of Maximinus Thrax toward right, bust with cuirass	LIB-ERALITAS AVG, Maximinus Thrax, sitting on a platform in the center, facing left; two soldiers with spears behind him, the goddess Liberalitas standing to the left, holding an abacus and a cornucopia; citizens climbing the steps of the platform where five soldiers with spears are positioned at his feet	236	27 mm, 15.00 grams	RIC IV 48.

== First two Gordians (238) ==
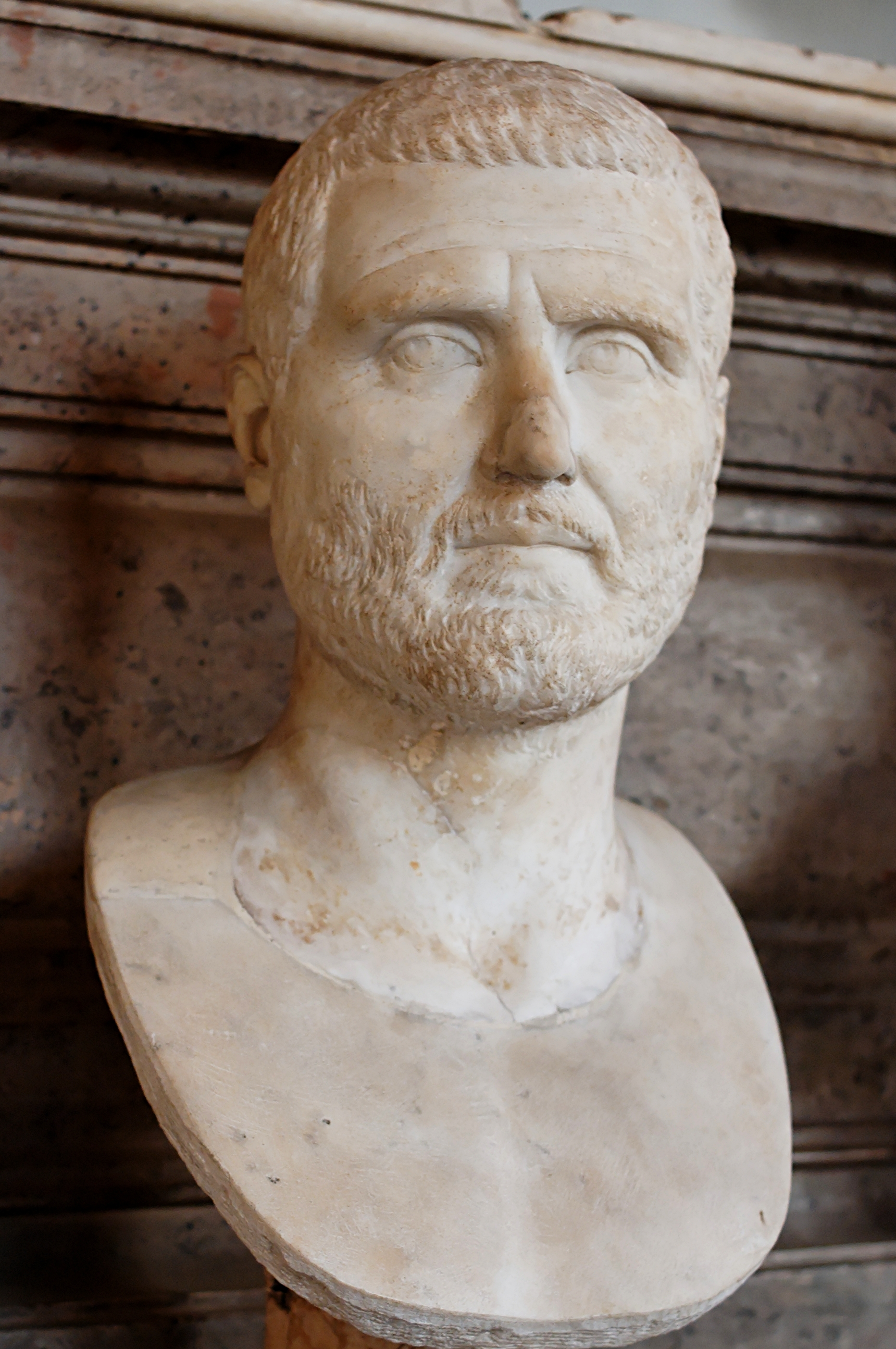
Gordian I, first of the three Gordians.

Growing general discontent towards Emperor Maximinus Thrax's rule culminated in the rebellion in Africa in March 238. Gordian I, prompted by popular clamor, assumed the post and the cognomen Africanus on March 22. Given his advanced age, he insisted that his son, Mark Antony Gordianus (Gordian II), be associated with him. The Senate confirmed Gordian as the new emperor along with his son, and his nephew Gordian III was promised the praetorship, consulship, and the title of Caesar, while Maximinus and his son were proclaimed "public enemies," and most of the provinces sided with Gordian I, except for a few cities still loyal to Maximinus.

The reign of the first two Gordians was short-lived, as the governor of Numidia, Capelianus, who remained loyal to Maximinus Thrax, invaded the province of Africa and headed for Carthage. Here, Gordian II was defeated and killed in the battle of Carthage. Following the death of his son, Gordian I committed suicide, hanging himself with a girdle. They had reigned for only twenty days.

=== Coinage of the two Gordians ===
Gordian I and II
Picture	Value	Obverse	Reverse	Date	Weight and diameter	Catalog
	sestertius	IMP CAES M ANT GORDIANVS AFR AVG, head toward right with laurel on head, drapery on shoulders	VICTORIA AV-GG(ustorum), S C on either side, Victory advancing to the left, holding a crown in her right hand and a palm in her left	minted in 238	21.41 grams	RIC Gordianus, IV 12; Pink III, pg. 23; Banti 8; BMCRE 15; Cohen 14.
	sestertius	IMP CAES M ANT GORDIANVS AFR AVG, head toward right with laurel on head, drapery on shoulders	VIRTVS AVGG, S C at the sides, Virtus standing to the left, holding a shield resting on the ground in the right and a spear turned toward the ground in the left	minted in 238	20.21 grams	RIC Gordianus, IV 8; Pink III, pg. 23; Banti 7; BMCRE 31; Cohen 15.

== Pupienus and Balbinus (238) ==
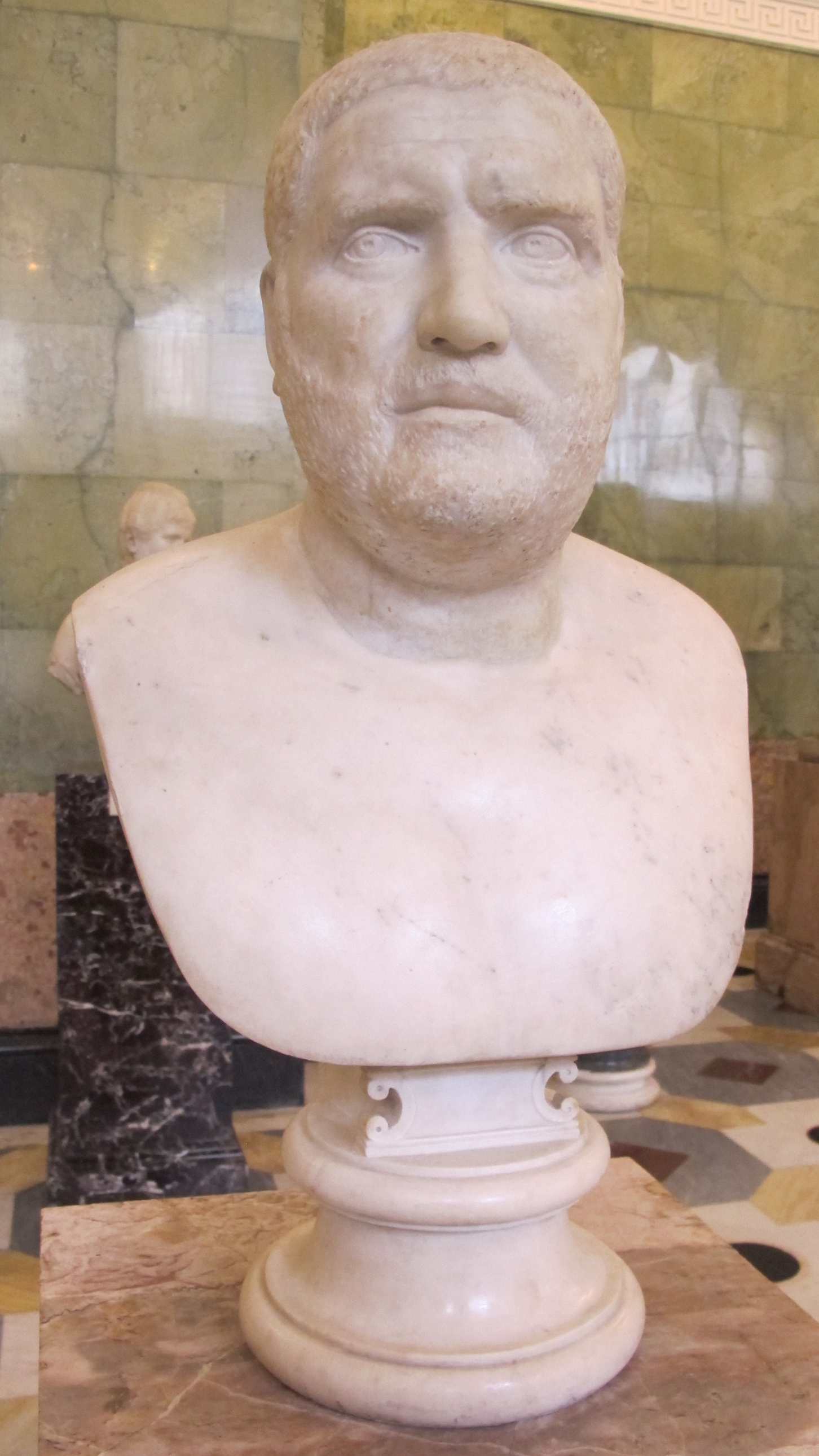
Bust of Balbinus.

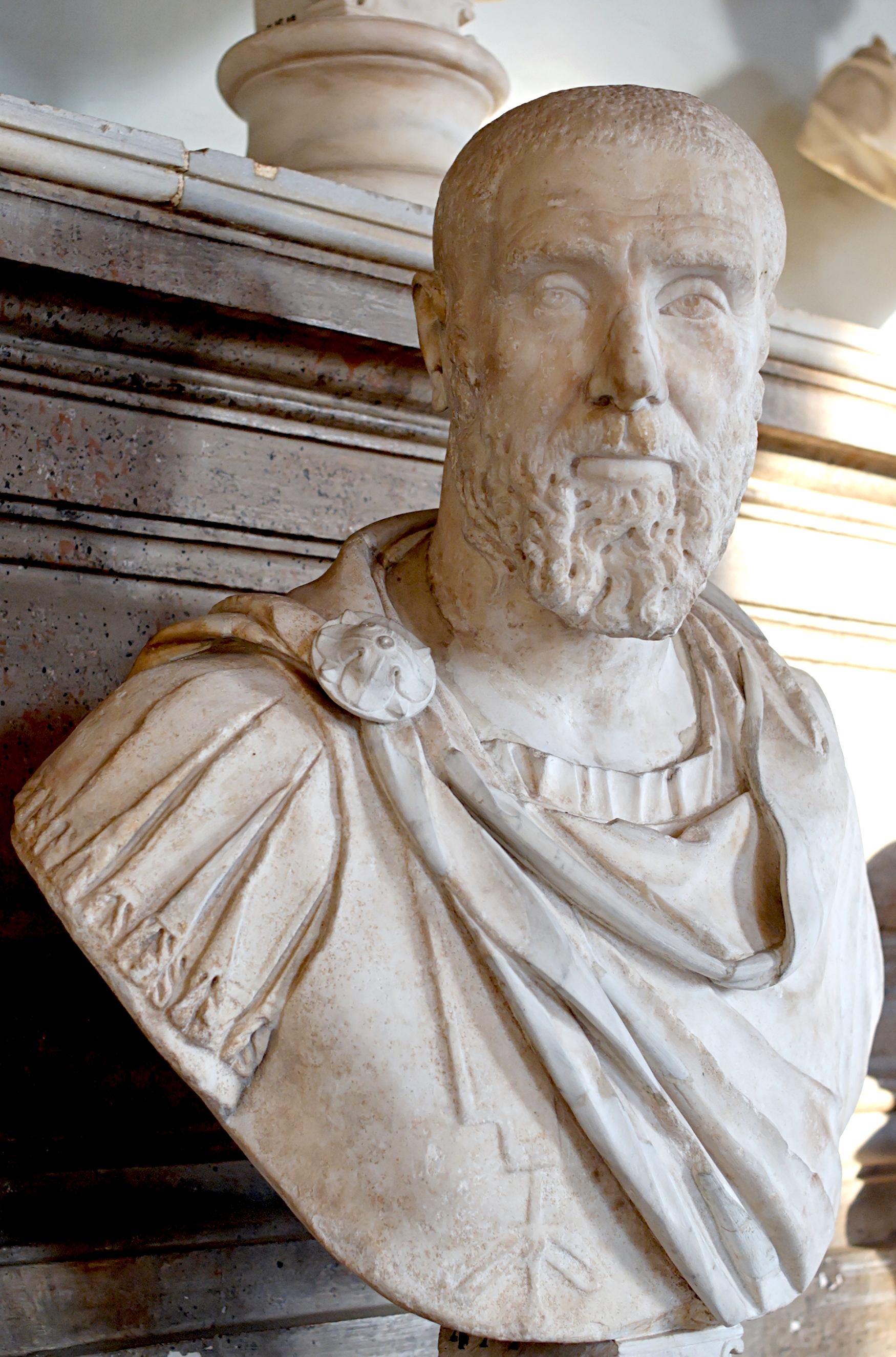
Bust of Pupienus

Having supported the cause of the two Gordians, and facing the threat posed by Maximinus who was coming from the frontier, the Senate was forced to continue the struggle, naming Pupienus and Balbinus as co-emperors in the Temple of Jupiter Optimus Maximus in April 22, 238. There was, however, an uprising by the plebs of Rome, particularly the supporters of the Gordian party, who wanted someone from the family of the defeated rebels to be elected emperor. Pupienus and Balbinus agreed to appoint as Caesar the son of Maecia Faustina, the sister of Gordianus II and the daughter of Gordianus I, namely Gordianus III. Pupienus, due to his military career, was sent against Maximinus as the head of the army, while Balbinus remained in Rome to quell a plebeian revolt favorable to Gordianus III. When Maximinus Thrax died (late April to early May), Pupienus paid off Maximinus' troops, returned to Rome, and, along with Balbinus and Gordian III, retreated to the imperial palace. Soon afterward new riots began in the city. Balbinus was later involved in the clash with Gordian III's partisans, and the city was burning from fires set by the rioters. With the presence of both co-emperors, the situation stabilized, but disquiet remained. Balbino and Pupieno both feared being assassinated by each other. It was, however, the fear that the emperors, chosen by the senate, would disband the Praetorian Guard and replace it with the Germanic guard that prompted some praetorians to stage a coup. The praetorians, having penetrated the imperial palace, captured the two emperors and killed them shortly afterward. The praetorians themselves then acclaimed Gordian III as the sole emperor. Pupienus and Balbinus had reigned for just under three months. Coins issued in their short reign show one of the two on one face and on the other, two hands clasped to symbolize their joint power.

=== Coinage of Pupienus and Balbinus ===
Balbinus and Pupienus
Picture	Value	Obverse	Reverse	Date	Weight and diameter	Catalog
	denarius	IMP CM COLD PVPIENUS AVG, head toward right with laurel on head, drapery on shoulders	CONCORDIA AVGG(ustorum), the goddess Concordia seated facing left, holding a patera and two cornucopias	minted in 238 (mint of ancient Rome, 1st issue)	19 mm, 2.82 grams	RIC Pupienus, IV 1; RSC 6.
	denarius	IMP C(aesar) D CAEL BALBINVS AVG, head toward right with laurel on head, drapery on shoulders	IOVI CONSE-RVATORI, Jupiter standing facing left, holding a thunderbolt in his right hand and a scepter, resting on the ground, in his left	minted in 238 (mint of ancient Rome)	3.21 grams	RIC Balbinus, IV 2; RSC 8.
	sestertius	IMP CAES(ar) D CAEL BALBINVS AVG, head toward the right with laurel on head, breastplate and drapery on shoulders	VICTORIA AVGG(ustorum), Victory standing facing left, holding a crown and a palm branch	minted in 238 (mint of ancient Rome, 1st issue)	30 mm, 22.56 grams	RIC Balbinus, IV 25; BMCRE 40–1; Banti 9.
	antoninianus	IMP CAES(ar) D CAEL BALBINVS AVG, crowned head toward right, breastplate and drapery on shoulders	PIETAS MVTVA AVGG(ustorum), two hands shaking in a sign of agreement between Balbinus and Pupienus	minted in 238 (mint of ancient Rome)	24 mm, 4.57 grams	RIC Balbinus, IV 11; RSC 6; BMCRE 71.
	antoninianus	IMP CM COLD PVPIENVS AVG, crowned head toward right, breastplate and drapery on shoulders	PATRES SENATVS, two hands shaking in a sign of agreement between Balbinus and Pupienus	minted in 238 (mint of ancient Rome)	21 mm, 5.31 grams	RIC Pupienus, IV 11a; BMCRE 81; RSC 19.

== Gordian III (238-244) ==
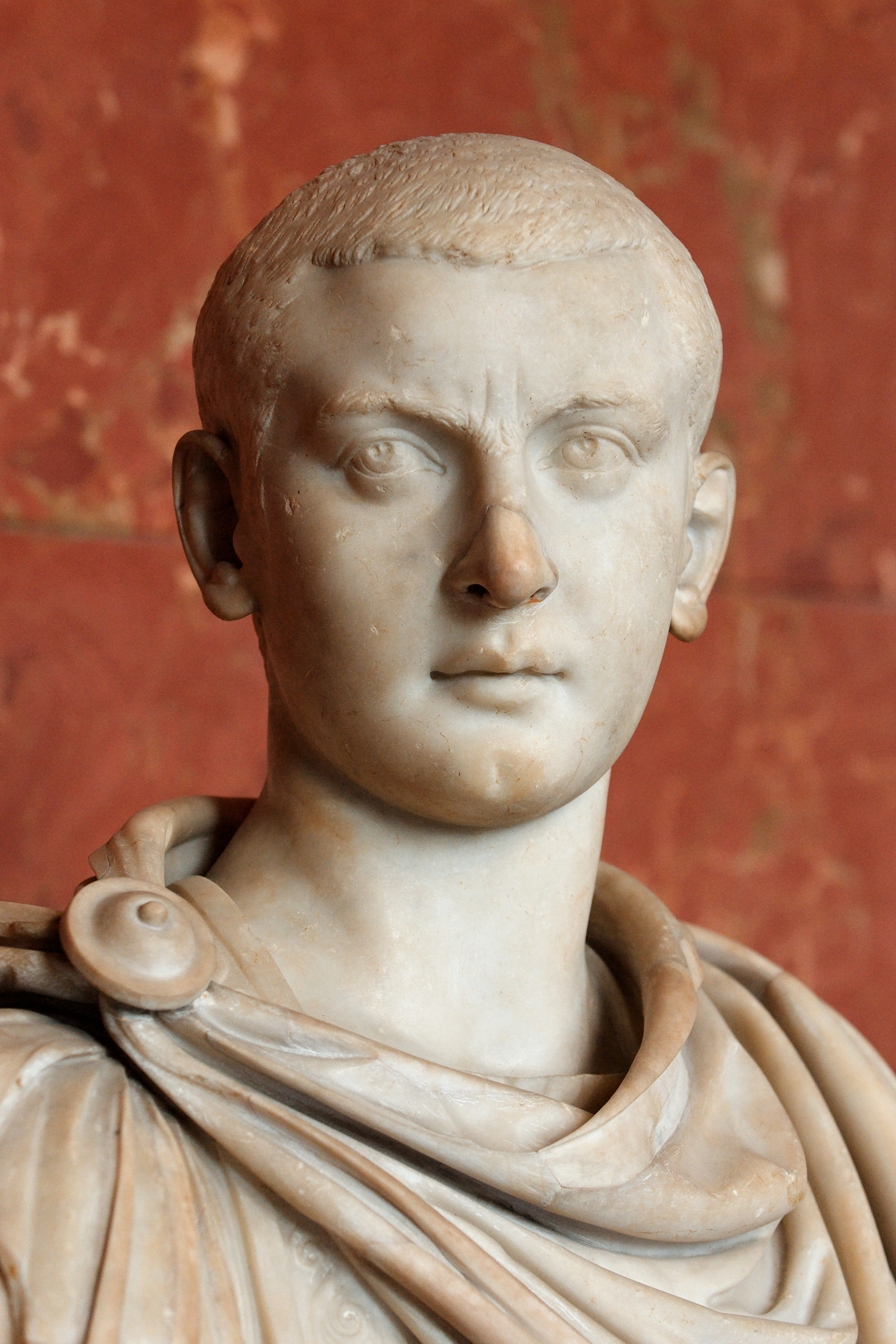
Bust of Gordian III, in the Louvre Museum.

Mark Antony Gordianus (Gordian III), was Roman emperor from 238 until his death during a military campaign in the East against the Sasanians. Because of his youth (he ascended the throne at the age of thirteen and reigned until nineteen), the imperial government was in the hands of regents belonging to the senatorial aristocracy. In fact, between late 240 and early 241, the emperor appointed Gaius Furius Sabinius Aquila Timesitheus prefect of the praetorium, taking his daughter as his wife. Timesitheus, who had already been in administrations of several provinces, had the title of protector of the Republic. As head of the praetorians and father-in-law of the emperor, Timesitheus quickly became the de facto arbiter of the Roman empire. Meanwhile, Gordian benefited from this help, becoming the symbol of the empire's unity and garnering the support of the people.

Persian sources report that, in early 244, the Persians and Romans clashed at the Battle of Misiche (currently Fallujah), which ended in defeat for the Romans. Shapur I changed the city's name to Peroz-Shapur ("victorious Shapur") and celebrated the victory with an inscription at Naqsh-e Rostam in which he claimed to have killed Gordian. Roman sources, however, make no mention of the battle and suggest that Gordian died at Circesium, more than 300 km north of Peroz-Shapur, but do not report the cause of the emperor's death, although the prefect of the praetorium, Philip, who succeeded him on the throne, was often described as the instigator of his assassination. Despite the opposition of the new emperor, he was deified after his death to please the people and prevent rebellion.

Imperial title	Number of times	Date
Tribunicia potestas	7 times	first on May 238, then renewed annually on December 10
Consul	2 times	in 239 and in 241.
Victory titles	once	Invictus (never defeated).
Imperator	7 times	first upon assumption of imperial power in May 238, then again in 239 (II), 240 (III), 241 (IV), 242 (V and VI) and 243 (VII).
Other titles		Pontifex Maximus, Pater Patriae, Pius, and Felix in 238.

=== Main themes ===
==== Wedding to Furia Sabinia Tranquillina ====
In late 240 and early 241 Emperor Gordian III appointed Gaius Furius Sabinius Aquila Timesitheus prefect of the praetorium and married his daughter, Furia Sabinia Tranquillina, the following summer, as also celebrated in the coinage of that year.

Gordian III and Tranquillina
Picture	Value	Obverse	Reverse	Date	Weight and diameter	Catalog
	antoninianus	SABINIA TRANQVILLINA AVG, head toward right with diadem and crest on head, drapery on bust	CONCORDIA AVGG(ustorum), Gordian III standing to the right, holding a scroll in his left hand, shaking the hand of his bride Tranquillina who is standing in front of him, turned to the left	minted in 241	21.41 grams	RIC Gordianus III, IV 250 (Gordian); RSC 4.
	sestertius	Old-style crowned head of Gordian III wearing cuirass and drapery (left), his wife Tranquillina at right, facing each other	Tyche seated on a rock, holding a small boat as she crosses a river; above is a Sagittarius (symbol of the Legio I Parthica stationed at Singara), shooting an arrow from its bow	minted in 243/244?	33 mm, 26.18 grams	BMC pg. 135, 7. Sear# 3804.

==== Sassanid campaign ====
With the rise of the first Sasanian ruler, Ardashir I, the Persian armies returned to attacking the Roman Empire with greater force. Indeed, in 230, the Sasanian armies advanced into Roman Mesopotamia, laying siege to many Roman garrisons along the Euphrates, also trying, unsuccessfully, to conquer Nisibis (a center of trade with the East and China), and possibly invading the Roman provinces of Syria and Cappadocia. The following year (in 231), Emperor Alexander Severus organized a military expedition against the Sasanian armies. The military campaign proved successful for the Romans, however, as the territories lost in Mesopotamia in the course of the Sasanian advance in 229–230 were recaptured, and the Sasanids remained quiet until 239–240, while Alexander earned the titles of Parthicus Maximus and Persicus.

Starting in 238/239, a new large-scale invasion by the Sasanian armies led them to lay siege to the fortress city of Dura-Europos, a Roman outpost on the Euphrates. The following year, Ardashir I finally succeeded in his feat of occupying and destroying the important Roman-allied stronghold city of Hatra, then occupying much of Roman Mesopotamia (including the legionary fortresses of Resaina and Singara as well as the auxiliary fort of Zagurae, nowadays Ain Sinan, perhaps also besieging and occupying Antioch, as seems to be suggested by the fact that it stopped minting coinage for the years 240 and 241.

Gordian III, after mobilizing the army, marched eastward, with the command of the campaign entrusted to his father-in-law Timesitheus, and the other prefect of the praetorium, Gaius Julius Priscus. The Roman armies prevailed throughout 243, repeatedly beating the Persians, taking from them Harran, Nisibis, and Singara, and then defeating them at the Battle of Resaena. The sudden death of Timesitheus left the young emperor lacking the necessary military experience, jeopardizing the safety of his armies and himself. Persian sources report that, early in the year, Persians and Romans clashed again at the Battle of Misiche, which ended in defeat for the Romans and the death of Gordian. Roman sources, however, do not mention the battle and suggest that Gordian died near Circesium, leaving the suspicion that he was killed by the praetorian prefect Philip the Arab, who later succeeded him on the throne.

Gordian III and the Sassanid campaign
Picture	Value	Obverse	Reverse	Date	Weight and diameter	Catalog
	antoninianus	IMP CAES M ANT GORDIANVS AVG PM, laureate head and bust with cuirass and drapery.	PAX AVGVSTI, Peace standing to the left, holding a twig and a scepter	240–242? (before the start of the Sasanian war?)	4.59 grams (mint of Antioch)	RIC Gordianus, IV 189a; RSC 174a.
	sestertius	IMP GORDIANVS PIVS FEL AVG PM, laureate head and bust with cuirass and drapery.	P M TR P V COS II P P, Gordian standing to the left, holding an orb in his left hand and a spear askew in his right	242	28 mm, 17.86 grams (mint of ancient Rome, 6th workshop, 10th issue)	RIC Gordianus, IV 307a; Banti 75.
	sestertius	IMP GORDIANVS PIVS FEL AVG PM, laureate head and bust with cuirass and drapery.	VICTORIA AETER(nitatis), Victory standing to the left, holding a palm and shield over a captive (Sasanian) seated on her left; S-C on the sides	244	31 mm, 20.92 grams (mint of ancient Rome, 5th workshop, 13th issue)	RIC Gordianus, IV 337a; Banti 105.
	sestertius	IMP GORDIANVS PIVS FEL AVG PM, laureate head and bust with cuirass and drapery.	MARS PROPVGNAT(or), Mars advancing to the right, holding a shield and a spear askew; S-C on the sides	January or February, 244	29 mm, 22.08 grams (mint of ancient Rome, 6th workshop, 13th issue)	RIC Gordianus, IV 332; Banti 52.

== Philip the Arab (244–249) ==
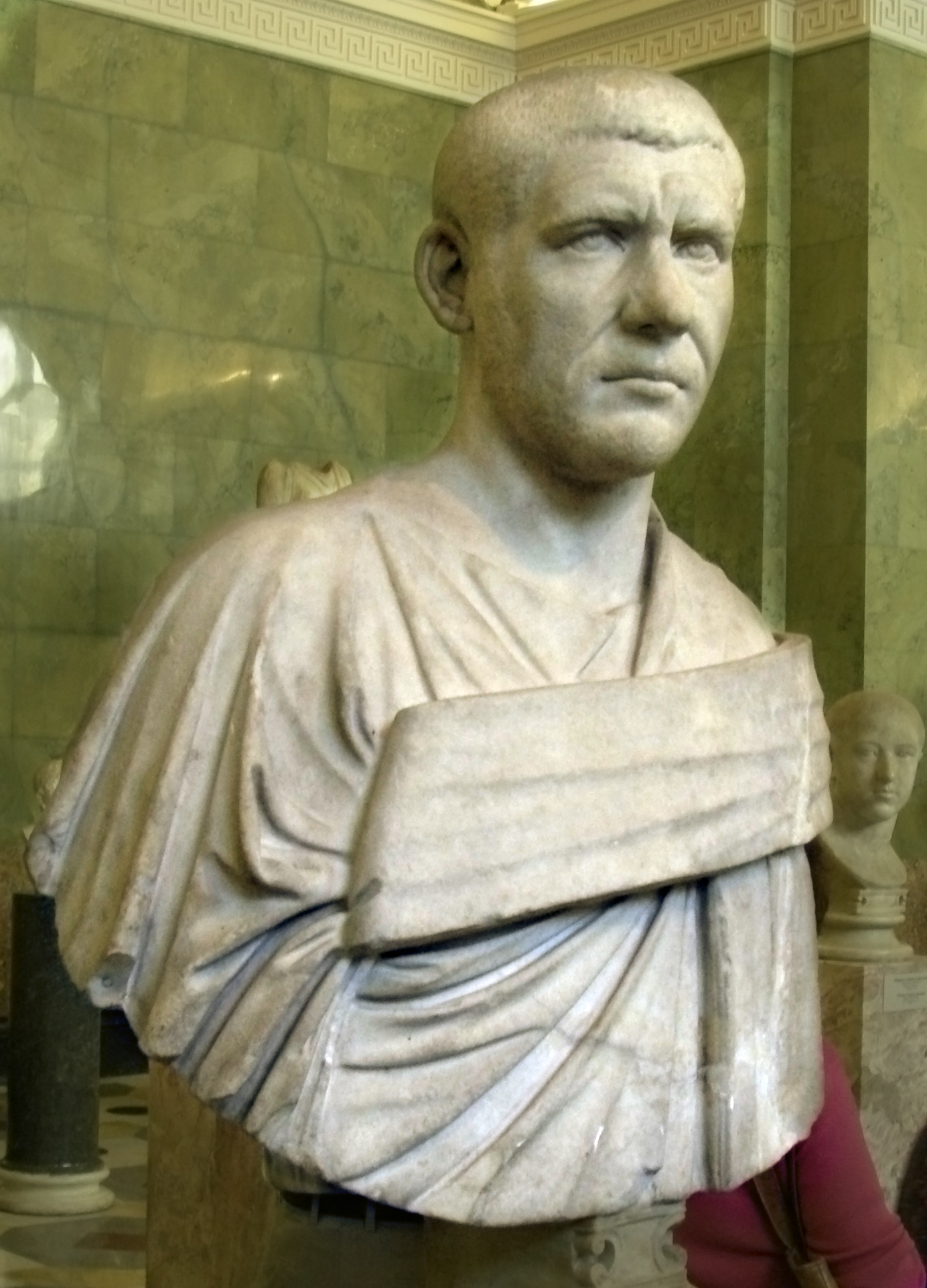
Bust of Philip the Arab.

Little is known about Philip the Arab's life and political career before his ascent to the throne. He was born in Shahba in the province of Syria, a small town around 80 kilometers southeast of Damascus. In the 230s Philip married Marcia Otacilia Severa and in 238 had a son named Marcus Julius Severus Philip. In 243, during Gordian III's Sasanian campaign, the prefect of the praetorium, Timesitheus, died under obscure circumstances. At the suggestion of the other prefect, Gaius Julius Priscus, Philip's brother, the latter was appointed Timesitheus's successor, thus allowing the two brothers to control the young emperor and the empire as regents.

Following a defeat at the Battle of Meseche, Gordian III ordered the army to retreat but died en route. Philip was, then, proclaimed emperor.

Intent on not repeating the mistakes of the previous emperors, he was persuaded to go to Rome to strengthen his position in the Senate. He appointed his young son Marcus Julius Severus Philip (later co-Augustus) as Caesar. Philip's rule was, therefore, aimed at repelling the continuing invasions of the Barbarians along the Danubian Limes (245–248), earning the titles of Germanicus Maximus and Carpicus Maximus.

A series of revolts then broke out in 248. In the East, Jotapian led a revolt against government measures and over-taxation in the territories ruled by Philip's brother Priscus. In Mesia and Pannonia, Pacatian was acclaimed emperor by the troops, but the revolt was suppressed by the future emperor Gaius Messius Quintus Decius, who was then placed in charge of the two provinces. Finally, it was the turn of Silbannacus and Sponsianus, fomenters of as many revolts, which had no results.

Sent to the region to punish and command the legions that had supported the usurpers, Decius was instead proclaimed emperor of the Danubian army in the spring of 249 and immediately marched to Rome. Philip's army came into contact with the usurper's army near Verona in early summer: in the ensuing battle Decius won and Philip was killed. When news reached Rome, Severus Philip, Philip's 11-year-old heir, was assassinated by the Praetorian guard.

Imperial title	Number of times	Date
Tribunicia potestas	6 times	first on February 244, then renewed annually on December 10.
Consul	3 times	in 245, 247, and 248.
Victory titles	5 times	Adiabenicus (?), Carpicus Maximus (247), Germanicus (246), Parthicus Maximus, and Persicus Maximus (244).
Imperator	at least 6 times	first at the time of his ascension to the throne, then in 244 (II, III and IV), 246 (V), 247 (VI).
Other titles		Pontifex Maximus, Pater Patriae, Pius, and Felix in 244.

=== Main themes ===
==== End of the war against the Sassanids ====
Emperor Gordian died suddenly and his soldiers built him a cenotaph at Circesium (on the bank of the Euphrates, in the locality of Zaitha). It is not known whether he died in battle or at the hands of his successor, the prefect of the Praetorium, Philip the Arab, which resulted in the withdrawal of the Roman armies, a peace judged by Zosimus, and probably the loss of part of Mesopotamia and Armenia, although Philip bore the title Persicus maximus. The Res gestae divi Saporis, a propaganda epigraph of the Sassanid emperor, recounts:

Gordian Caesar was killed and the Roman armies were destroyed. The Romans then made Caesar a certain Philip. Then Caesar Philip came to us to negotiate the terms of peace, and to ransom the lives of the captives, giving us 500,000 denarii, and thus became our tributary. For this reason, we renamed the locality of Mesiche, Peroz-Shapur [i.e., 'Victory of Sapur']

— Res gestae divi Saporis, lines 8–9

The Roman East was, therefore, entrusted by Philip to his brother, Gaius Julius Priscus, appointed Rector Orientis, while the defensive line in Mesopotamia was reorganized around the stronghold cities of Nisibis, Circesium, and Resaina.

Philip the Arab and the Sassanids
Picture	Value	Obverse	Reverse	Date	Weight and diameter	Catalog
	antoninianus	IMP C M IVL PHILIPPVS P F AVG P M, head with radiate crown, wearing breastplate	PAX FVNDATA CVM PERSIS, Peace standing, holding a branch and a scepter	minted in 244	22 mm, 4.27 grams	RIC Philippus, IV, 69; Hunter 120; RSC 113.

==== Thousand years of Rome’s foundation ====
In April 248, Philip presided over the celebration of the 1,000th anniversary of Rome, founded in 753 BC. The event was celebrated with Secular Games and a rich coinage. According to contemporary reports, the festivities included games and theatrical performances throughout the city. The coinage bears numerous subjects such as a column with the inscription MILIARIUM SAECULUM or one with the inscription COS III, or the inscription LUDI SAECULARES AUGG, or the Capitoline she-wolf suckling Romulus and Remus, a lion, a deer, an antelope, a hexastyle temple with the statue of Rome in the center and the inscription SAECULUM NOVUM.

Thousand years of Roman history
Picture	Value	Obverse	Reverse	Date	Weight and diameter	Catalog
	antoninianus	IMP PHILIPPVS AVG P M, head with radiate crown, wearing breastplate	SAECULARES AUGG, a memorial stone commemorating the first millennium of Roman history on which is written COS III (on two lines)	minted in 248	22 mm, 4.3 grams?	?
	antoninianus	IMP PHILIPPVS AVG, head with radiate crown, wearing breastplate	SAECULARES AUGG, the Capitol she-wolf suckling Romulus and Remus to commemorate the first millennium of Roman history	minted in 248	22 mm, 4.3 grams?	Cohen 178.
	antoninianus	IMP PHILIPPVS AVG, head with radiate crown, wearing breastplate	SAECULARES AUGG, a lion representing the Secular Games commemorating the first millennium of Roman history	minted in 248	22 mm, 4.3 grams?	Cohen 173.
	antoninianus	IMP PHILIPPVS AVG, head with radiate crown, wearing breastplate	SAECULARES AUGG, an antelope representing the Secular Games commemorating the first millennium of Roman history	minted in 248	22 mm, 4.3 grams?	Cohen 188.
	antoninianus	IMP PHILIPPVS AVG, head with radiate crown, wearing breastplate	SAECULUM NOVUM, a hexastyle temple with a statue of Rome at its center, commemorating the first millennium of Roman history	minted in 248	22 mm, 4.3 grams?	Cohen 198.

==== War in the Danubian Limes ====
Philip's rule began with military campaigns against the peoples north of the Danube. In 246 he reported a great success against the Germanic peoples of the Quadi along the Pannonian front, thanks to which he was given the appellation "Germanicus Maximus". In 247, the Roman offensive resumed along the lower Danubian front against the Carpi, so he was given new honors and the title "Carpicus maximus".

In 248 there was a new incursion of Goths, who had been refused the annual contribution promised by Gordian III, and of the Carpi, their associates, to the province of Lower Moesia. The invasion was eventually stopped by Philip the Arab's general, Decius Trajan, the future emperor, at the city of Marcianopolis, which had remained under siege for a long time.

Danubian Limes
Picture	Value	Obverse	Reverse	Date	Weight and diameter	Catalog
	antoninianus	IMP PHILIPPVS AVG, head with crown, wearing breastplate	VICTORIA CARPICA, Victory advancing to the right, holding a palm and a laurel wreath	minted in 245	23 mm, 4.35 grams	Roman Imperial Coinage, Philippus, IV, 66; RSC 238.
	as	IMP M IVL PHILIPPVS AVG, head with crown, wearing breastplate	PROVINCIA DACIA, an inscription at the bottom AN II, Dacia stands between two insignia of the legions V Macedonica (eagle symbol) and XIII Gemina (lion symbol)	minted in 247/248	29 mm, 16.47 grams	AMNG I 9; Varbanov 6 var.; Mionnet Supp. II 5.

== Decius Trajanus (249–251) ==
The historical sources for Decius' life are fragmentary and make it hard to reconstruct the history of his reign and his origins. It is known from Aurelius Victor that he was a career military man of Illyrian origin, the forerunner of the so-called Illyrian emperors, and that this characteristic was celebrated in his coinage with the inscriptions PANNONIAE or GENIVS EXERCITUS ILLVRICIANI.

During his reign, Emperor Decius tried to lift the spirits of the empire, which had fallen into crisis in the third century, by relying on the restoration of tradition, but his choice was shown not suitable for a state that was changing rapidly. He was unable to counter the Germanic invasions.

Decius's power had its basis in the senatorial aristocracy and the army, and to both he presented himself as the restorer of tradition, through appropriate propaganda, including monetary propaganda, and by taking up those traits of the princeps that recalled the late Republic and early Empire. Politically, Decius revalued republican offices. He assumed for himself the consulship for each year of his reign; he restored the censorship magistracy by appointing Publius Licinius Valerian as censor; he assumed command of troops on the battlefield and bestowed honors on soldiers regardless of their rank.

He harkened back to the dynasty of the Five Good Emperors by taking the name Trajan in honor of and in reference to the emperor Trajan. He resumed, after twenty years, a public building program in Rome: he restored the earthquake-damaged Colosseum and built the Baths of Decius on the Aventine.

He sought, finally, to establish a dynasty, as Philip had done before him: his sons Herennius Etruscus and Hostilianus received the title of caesar, with Erennius then elevated to the rank of Augustus in 251; Herennia Etruscilla was appointed Augusta.

Imperial title	Number of times	Date
Tribunicia potestas	3/(4?) times	first around mid-249, then renewed annually on December 10.
Consul	3 times	in 232, 250, and 251.
Victory titles	3 times	Parthicus Maximus (in 250), Germanicus Maximus (in 250), Dacicus Maximus, and Restitutor Daciarum (in 250).
Imperator	at least 2/3 times	first at the time of his ascension to the throne, then in 250 (II and III).
Other titles		Pontifex Maximus, Pater Patriae, Pius, and Felix in 249.

=== Main themes ===
Decius Trajanus
Picture	Value	Obverse	Reverse	Date	Weight and diameter	Catalog
	aureus	IMP C M Q TRAIANVS DECIVS AVG, head with laurel wreath, wearing a breastplate	VICTORIA AVGG, Victory advancing to the left, holding a crown in her right and a palm in her left hand	minted in 249/250	4.31 grams	RIC Decius, IV, 29a; Cohen 107.
	antoninianus	IMP C M Q TRAIANVS DECIVS AVG, head with radiate crown, wearing a breastplate	GENIVS EXERC ILLVRICIANI, Genius standing to the left, holding a patera and a cornucopia; banners on the right	minted in 249/250	21 mm, 3.77 grams	RIC Decius, IV 16c; Hunter 11 var. (rev. legend); RSC 49.
	antoninianus	IMP C M Q TRAIANVS DECIVS AVG, head with radiate crown, wearing a breastplate	D-ACIA, Dacia standing to the left, holding a stick with a donkey's head on top	minted in 250	4.99 grams	RIC Decius, IV, 12b; Hunter 7; RSC 16.
	double sestertius	IMP C M Q TRAIANVS DECIVS AVG, head with radiate crown, wearing a breastplate	Felicitas SAECVLI S-C, the goddess Felicitas standing in front, head turned to the left, holding a caduceus and cornucopia	minted in 250	34 mm, 31.80 grams (mint of Ancient Rome, 4th workshop, 3rd issue)	RIC Decius, IV, 115; Banti 9; Cohen 40.
	sestertius	IMP C M Q TRAIANVS DECIVS AVG, head with laurel wreath, wearing a breastplate	P-A-NNONI-A-E, the two provinces of Upper and Lower Pannonia standing facing each other, heads facing left, each holding a vexillum; S-C at the sides	minted in 250	27 mm, 19.43 grams (mint of Ancient Rome, 3rd workshop, 3rd–4th issue)	RIC Decius, IV, 124d; Banti 22.
	sestertius	Q HER ETR MES DECIVS NOB C, head toward right of Erennius Etruscus, drapery on bust, wearing a breastplate	PIETAS AVGVSTORVM, S C in exergue; a simpulum, an aspergillum, a pitcher and a lituus placed on top of a patera	minted between spring 250 and middle 251	27 mm, 21 grams	RIC Decius, IV, 168 a, Cohen 15.
	sestertius	IMP CAE C VAL HOS MES QVINTVS AVG, head with laurel wreath, wearing a breastplate	SECVRITAS AVGG S-C, Securitas standing to the left, with his hand on his head and elbow on a column	minted in 251	28 mm, 19.28 grams (mint of Ancient Rome, 5th workshop, 1st issue)	RIC Decius, IV, 225; Cohen 60; Banti 15.
	antoninianus	IMP CAE TRA DECIVS AVG, head with radiate crown, wearing a breastplate	VIC-TORIA GERMANICA, Decius on horseback toward the left, raising his right hand and holding a scepter in his left; on the left the goddess Victory is advancing toward the left, holding a branch in her right and a palm tree in her left	minted in 251 (ancient Rome mint);	3.33 grams	RIC Decius, IV, 43 corr. (obv. legend), and pl. 10, 20 (illustrated); RSC 122.

== Trebonianus Gallus (251–253) ==
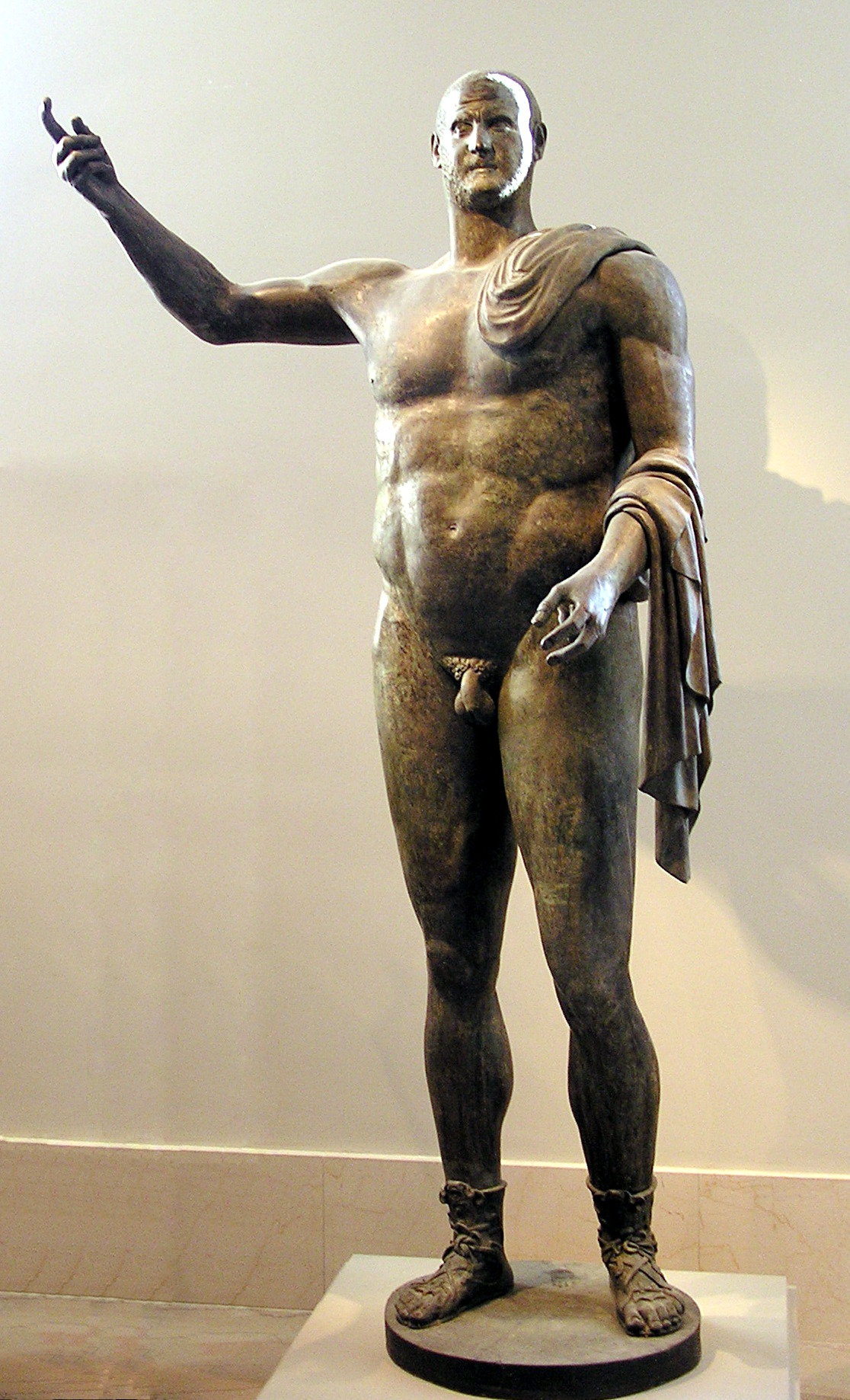
Bronze statue of Trebonianus Gallus.

Gaius Vibius Trebonianus Gallus was Roman emperor from 251 to 253 along with his son Volusianus. His reign was marked by a long series of disasters, such as the plague that struck Rome for years, the incursions of barbarian populations beyond the empire's borders, and the loss (according to some sources that occurred during his reign) of Syria to the Sasanians. He imprinted part of his program in the wording of the coins he had minted: Pax aeterna.

Imperial title	Number of times	Date
Tribunicia potestas	3/(4?) times	first around June 251, then renewed annually on December 10.
Consul	2 times	in 240 and then in 252.
Victory titles	once	Invictus.
Imperator	once?	upon ascension to the throne.
Other titles		Pontifex Maximus, Pater Patriae, Pius, and Felix in 251.

=== Main themes ===
Trebonianus Gallus
Picture	Value	Obverse	Reverse	Date	Weight and diameter	Catalog
	antoninianus	IMP CC VIB TREB GALLUS AVG, radiate head of Trebonius Gallus toward right, drapery and cuirass	LIBERTAS PUBLICA, Libertas standing to the left, holding a pileus and a scepter askew	251–253	21 mm, 3.60 grams (mint of Mediolanum)	RIC, Trebonianus Gallus, IV 70; RSC 68.
	antoninianus	IMP CAE C VIB TREB GALLVS AVG, head with radiate crown, wearing a breastplate	Aeternitas AVGG, Aeternitas standing facing left, holding a phoenix on an orb and raising the hem of her skirt	minted in 253	21 mm, 3.77 grams (mint of Ancient Rome, 1st workshop, 3rd issue)	RIC Trebonianus Gallus, 30; RSC 13.

== Aemilianus (253) ==
Aemilianus was Roman emperor in 253 for three months, ascending to the throne after overthrowing Trebonianus Gallus. Shortly thereafter, he was defeated by Valerian, who became, along with his son Gallienus, the new Augustus. He was initially acclaimed Imperator by the troops of Mesia, after leading the Roman armies to victory against the Goths (July 253).

=== Main themes ===
Emiliano
Picture	Value	Obverse	Reverse	Date	Weight and diameter	Catalog
	antoninianus	IMP CAES AEMILIANVS P F AVG, head with radiate crown, wearing a breastplate	MARTI PACIF(ificator), Mars advancing to the left, holding a branch, shield and sword	minted in 253	2.37 grams	RIC Aemilianus, 15; Hunter 12; RSC 23.
	antoninianus	Cornelia Supera, head toward right with diadem and drapery	VESTA, goddess Vesta standing toward the left, holding a patera in her right hand and a scepter in her left	minted in 253	2.48 grams	RIC Aemilianus, 30; Hunter 1; RSC 5.

== See also ==
- Roman currency
- Temple of Juno Moneta
- Crisis of the Third Century

== Bibliography ==
- Aurelius Victor. Epitome de Caesaribus e De Vita et Moribus Imperatorum Romanorum [Epitome of the Caesars] (in Latin).
- Corpus Inscriptionum Latinarum.
- Cassius Dio. Storia Romana [History of Rome] (in Latin).
- Herodian. History of the Empire from the Death of Marcus.
- Eutropius. Breviarium ab Urbe condita [Breviarium of Roman history] (in Latin). Vol. 9.
- Jordanes. De origine actibusque Getarum [The Origin and Deeds of the Getae] (in Latin).
- Scriptores Historiae Augustae. Historia Augusta [Augustan History] (in Latin).
- Paulus Orosius. Historiarum adversus paganos libri septem [History of adverse pagans] (in Latin). Vol. 7.
- Zosimus. Historia Nova [New History] (in Ancient Greek).
- Belloni, Gian Guido (2004). La moneta romana. Società, politica, cultura [Roman currency. Society, politics, culture] (in Italian). Rome.
- Grant, Michel (1997). The Roman Emperors: A Biographical Guide to the Rulers of Imperial Rome, 31 BC – 476 (1st ed.). New York: Barnes and Noble. ISBN 9780760700914.
- Mackay, Christopher (2004). Ancient Rome: A Military and Political History. Cambridge University Press. ISBN 0-521-80918-5.
- Mazzarino, Santo (1973). L'Impero romano [The Roman Empire] (in Italian). Vol. 1. Bari: Laterza. ISBN 88-420-2401-5.
- Rémondon, Roger (1975). La crisi dell'impero romano, da Marco Aurelio ad Anastasio [The crisis of the Roman empire, from Marcus Aurelius to Anastasius] (in Italian). Milan.
- Scarre, Chris (1995). The Penguin Historical Atlas of Ancient Rome. Cambridge: Penguin Editions. ISBN 0-14-051329-9.
- Scarre, Chris (1995). Chronicle of the Roman Emperors. London. ISBN 0-500-05077-5.
- Mattingly, H (1923–1975). Coins of the Roman empire in the British Museum. Vol. 6. London.
- Cohen, H (1880–1892). Description Historique des monnaies frappées sous l'Empire Romain [Historical description of coins minted under the Roman Empire] (in French). Vol. III–IV. Paris.
- Mattingly, H; Sydenham, E. A (1926–1994). Roman Imperial Coinage. Vol. IVa–IVb. London.
- Seaby, H. A; Sear, D. R (1978). Roman Silver Coins. Vol. 5 (3rd ed.). London.
