= Battle of Verona (249) =

Battle between Roman general Decius and Emperor Philip the Arab (249)

Coordinates: 45°26′32.99″N 10°59′8.66″E

- Part of the civil war between Decius and Phillip
Date	249 AD
Location	Verona, Roman Italy
Result	Decius victory, death of emperor Philip, Decius becomes Roman Emperor

Belligerents
Decius's army	Philip's army

Commanders and leaders
Decius, Herennius Etruscus	Philip the Arab †

Strength
Unknown	Unknown

Casualties and losses
Unknown	Unknown

The Battle of Verona was fought between the Roman general and usurper Decius, and emperor Philip the Arab in 249. Decius was victorious and Philip and his son Philip II were both killed. Decius was subsequently declared Roman emperor.

== Prelude ==
In late 248, Gothic tribes had attacked the Roman province of Moesia on the frontier of the Danube River. Their advance was checked by the Roman general Pacatian, whose army subsequently proclaimed him emperor. The legitimate emperor Philip the Arab ordered the supportive and outspoken senator Decius to put down the rebellion. Before the imperial delegation reached Moesia, Pacatian's troops mutinied and assassinated their commander. Decius arrived, accompanied by his son Herennius Etruscus, and attempted to restore order to the usurper's army. Opposed to being led by the geographically distant government of Philip, the troops proclaimed Decius emperor instead. Decius and his army then marched to Italy, where Philip, commanding only two reserve legions, met them in battle.

== Battle ==
The two armies met in battle near Verona, Italy, in a bloody and brutal battle. Decius was heavily outnumbered by Philip.

6th century Byzantine writer Zosimus recorded the day:

The supporters of Decius, though they knew that the enemy had greatly the advantage in numbers, still retained their confidence, trusting to the general skill and prudence of Decius in affairs.

Not many details of the battle are known, but Decius is known to have had a better quality of troops than Philip, and Philip's chances of victory were deemed improbable. Philip was slain by Decius, and his army was defeated.

== Aftermath ==
Following his victory, Decius entered Rome and was received and hailed as emperor by the Senate, of which he had formerly been a prominent member.
