= Sponsianus =

Alleged Roman imperial usurper (fl. c. 240-270)

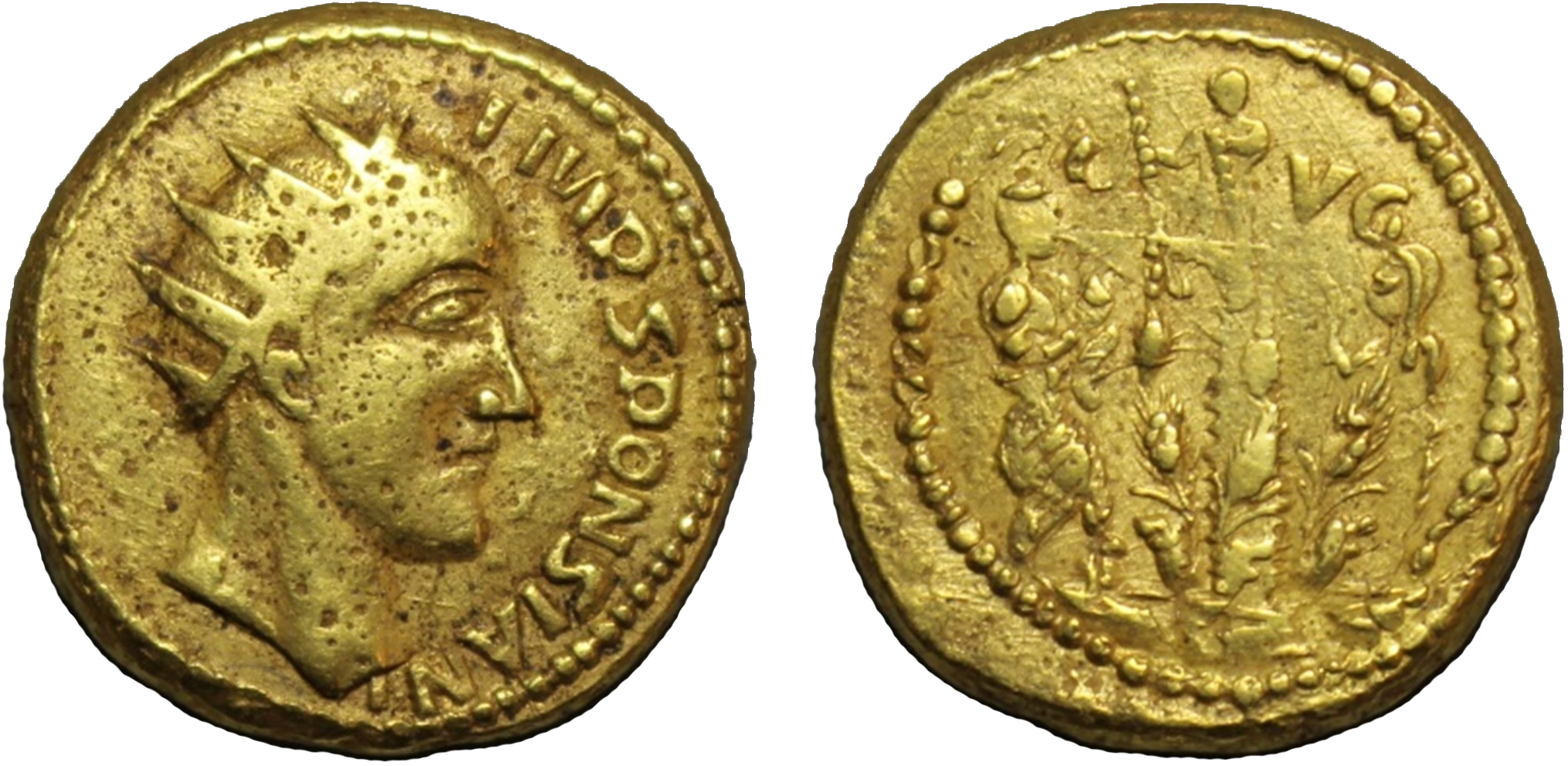
Gold aureus with the legend "Imp(eratoris) Sponsiani"

Sponsianus, also known in English as Sponsian, may have been a Roman usurper during the third century. His existence is implied by a series of coins bearing his name, ostensibly part of a hoard excavated in the eighteenth century.

No corresponding figure named Sponsianus is mentioned in any ancient sources, and the coins are widely believed to be the work of modern forgers. However, a study of wear marks on the coins published in November 2022 concluded that the coins were authentic, supporting Sponsian's existence as a historical figure. The study's methodology and conclusions have been criticized by a number of scholars.

Scholars who accept the historicity of Sponsianus date his activity to the Crisis of the Third Century, often locating him in the particularly unstable province of Dacia. More precise dating is a matter of controversy: some scholars have conjectured that he may have proclaimed himself emperor in the 260s, after Dacia was cut off from the rest of the Empire, or in the early 270s after it was formally abandoned by Aurelian. Others contend he may have been active earlier, during the reign of Philip the Arab or his son, Philip II.

== Discussion ==
=== Physical description and provenance ===
The sole evidence for the existence of Sponsianus is his name on a few double-aurei reportedly uncovered in a coin-hoard in Transylvania in 1713, and subsequently dispersed among several collections. (Note: The exact provenance of the coins is a subject of controversy among scholars; if the coins are inauthentic, no such hoard could have existed. (Pearson et al. 2022) catalogues the provenances (as far as they are known) of all the coins said to have been found in the hoard, as well as the provenances of other coins whose distinctive features match those of the coins ascribed to the hoard. There appear to have been seven coins depicting Sponsianus, including a now-lost silver piece. Only four are now extant.) One was kept in the Hunterian Museum at Glasgow University, alongside three coins depicting other figures also claimed to have been from the hoard. Another entered the bequest of Baron Samuel von Brukenthal, a Habsburg governor of Transylvania.

The aurei are highly unusual for the period. Firstly, the obverse of the coin features unusual lettering and gives Sponsianus' name in the genitive case (instead of the usual nominative). Second, the reverse of the coin is a copy of a Republican denarius struck in 135 BC with an apparently corrupted inscription. The coins are also unusually heavy, (Note: The coins bearing Sponsianus' name and image weigh 10.02 grams on average; for comparison those of Philip said to have been found in the same hoard average 4.30 grams.) and appear to have been cast, rather than produced using the more usual stamping process.

=== Traditional numismatic analysis ===
The traditional consensus among numismatists has been to regard the coins as modern forgeries. As early as 1828, Eckhel noted the strangeness of the coins and concluded against the historicity of Sponsianus. In 1868, the French numismatist Henri Cohen dismissed them as "very poor quality modern forgeries," and Rudolf Münsterberg's 1923 analysis, concluding that the coins were modern forgeries, is considered definitive by many numismatists. More recently, the coins were described as "strange and barbaric" in Roman Imperial Coinage, a British catalogue of Roman Imperial currency, and some numismatists have objected to their inclusion in the catalogue altogether. Other scholars concur with the RIC, and classify the coins as third-century imitations of Roman coinage, while still others contend that the coins can be ascribed to a historical usurper Sponsianus. In general, ancient historians have been more willing to accept the historicity of Sponsianus and the authenticity of the coins.

=== 2022 study and reactions ===
In 2022, a group of scientists led by Paul Pearson of University College London argued that scratch marks on one coin bearing Sponsianus' name and image, visible under an electron microscope, proved that the coin circulated in antiquity. The group also conducted a chemical analysis, concluding the earth deposits found in the coin's recesses showed that the coins had been buried in soil for hundreds of years. The study attracted significant scholarly and media attention, and led the Brukenthal Museum in Sibiu to reclassify another coin bearing Sponsianus' image as genuine.

In the aftermath of Pearson's analysis, several researchers have criticized the study and its conclusions. In an article for The Times Literary Supplement, Mary Beard suggests that the unusual features of the Sponsianus coin are better explained by its being an eighteenth-century forgery. Richard Abdy, the curator of the collection of Roman coins at the British Museum, condemned the study, stating "they've gone full fantasy." In the Journal Antigone, Alfred Deahl argued that the coins are forgeries, drawing attention to the unusual features of the coins as well as the oddness of the other coins purportedly found in the same hoard. (Note: Carl Gustav Heraeus, the numismatist who originally received many of the coins purportedly from the Transylvanian hoard, classified a piece bearing the image of Gordian III as a forgery immediately upon receiving the collection in March 1713. Deahl also notes that eighteenth-century forgers were sophisticated enough to add wear marks to their coins, which they created by placing them in bags with other coins, and handling them to simulate normal usage.) These doubts are echoed by Aleksander Bursche and Kyrylo Myzgin, who add that the very early finding and low gold content may count against the coins' authenticity. Alice Sharpless from the American Numismatic Society summarized criticism of the Pearson study by writing "the evidence of wear and of surface deposits cannot be shown conclusively not to have occurred in the modern period... Unless further study can provide more certain answers, it seems that these coins should continue to be regarded as modern forgeries."

Pearson's study has attracted significant attention from Romanian numismatists and classicists. Emanuel Petac, President of the Romanian Numismatic Society, stated that the coin "has nothing to do with the Roman world. Petac notes that the legend irregularly excludes his praenomen and cognomen, or whose son or grandson he is. (Note: Son: filius, f, fil; grandson: nepos, n, nep.) Another Romanian academic, Florian-Matei Popescu, highlighted the lack of written attestations of Sponsianus or his name—though the name Sponsianus is attested in the Roman world in inscriptions, these are very rare. Popescu argues that if the coins are real, which he deems unlikely, they date to the reign of Philip the Arab, who opened a mint in Dacia making low-value bronzes to pay the army.

== The name Sponsianus ==
The name Sponsianus is an authentic, but exceedingly rare, Roman name, derived from the Latin word spondere, to solemnly promise. Pearson notes only one instance, from a funerary inscription naming an obscure person called Nicodemus Sponsianus, dating from the early first century. This inscription was not published until 1726, several years after the supposed discovery of Sponsian's coins, and Pearson regards this as an argument for their authenticity: a forger would not have known of the name. Two other instances appear in the Corpus Inscriptionum Latinarum, a catalogue of known Latin inscriptions, all dating from the same period, while a further two inscriptions give the abbreviated form Sposianus; all five inscriptions are from Rome. One of the latter was published by Jan Gruter well before the first known appearance of the coins, and other examples are known besides these, so a forger might still have been aware of or guessed at the existence of such a name.

== Theories ==
Scholars who accept the historicity of Sponsianus have proposed several possibilities for when and where Sponsianus would have been active. One explanation, based upon the other coins found with the aurei, would date Sponsian's activity to the 240s, during the rule of Gordian III (238–244) or Philip the Arab (244–249). Based upon the location of his aurei, some scholars posit that he may have staged a revolt in Pannonia. Ilkka Syvänne places the revolt early in Philip's reign, and identifies Sponsianus with the obscure Severus Hostilianus mentioned in later Byzantine histories (though he notes the evidence is circumstantial).

Another explanation is that he was a military commander who crowned himself as emperor when Dacia was cut off from the rest of the empire around 260. With an ongoing pandemic and civil war, and the empire being fragmented at the time, Sponsianus may have assumed supreme command to protect the military and civilian population of Dacia until order was restored. The Romans eventually evacuated Dacia between 271 and 275. According to Jesper Ericsson:

Our interpretation is that he was in charge to maintain control of the military and of the civilian population because they were surrounded and completely cut off. In order to create a functioning economy in the province they decided to mint their own coins.

The Roman Empire in this period was highly unstable; many peripheral areas were left to fend for themselves. Dacia in particular was abandoned in the 270s by Aurelian after it was deemed too difficult to defend. Sponsianus may have found himself responsible for thousands of people, without support from the central regime of the empire, and surrounded by hostile tribes; in this context, Sponsianus taking the title of emperor has been characterized as an attempt to maintain order. He would have had access to a military force consisting of two legions there and their associated auxiliary personnel, totalling tens of thousands of soldiers. No other evidence has been found of Sponsianus' rule, and if he did exist, this would seem to indicate that Sponsianus was either uninterested or unsuccessful in expanding his territory.

In his Roman Imperial Coinage Volume IV Part 3 (2026) catalogue, the numismatic scholar Roger Bland, formerly of the British Museum, included a dedicated appendix for Sponsian called 'Sponsian, a fictitious emperor, and the ‘Transylvanian find’', examining all the arguments currently fielded for and against Sponsian as an authentic historical figure. He concluded ‘Taken together, these arguments from the leading experts in the field seem to me to be decisive. Much as one might like to believe in this curious group of purported “barbarian” imitations and so in the historicity of an otherwise unknown emperor Sponsian, it seems most likely that this is a group of Renaissance forgeries and that no such a person as Sponsian existed.’ Bland cites a passage in John Evelyn’s Numismata (1697, 209ff) which describes the production of similar forgeries, and finished, ‘This certainly provides a possible context for these forgeries.’

== See also ==
- Ingenuus
- Jotapian
- Pacatian
- Regalian
- Silbannacus
