= Julius Marinus =

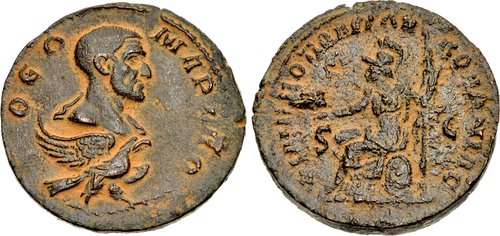
Coin of Philip the Arab. Obverse shows Julius Marinus.

Julius Marinus was the father of Roman Emperor Philip the Arab and Philip's brother Gaius Julius Priscus.

== Life ==
He was deified by his son. Scholar Pat Southern writes that this deification was unusual because Marinus was not an emperor, but it gave Philip's reign more legitimacy.

He was a Roman citizen from what is today Shahba, about 55 miles (89 km) southeast of Damascus; in the Trachonitis district and then in the Roman province of Arabia.

In life Marinus was possibly of some importance. By descent from Marinus, Philip held Roman citizenship.
