= Ingenuus =

Usurper of throne of Roman Empire (died 260)

- Usurper of the Roman Empire
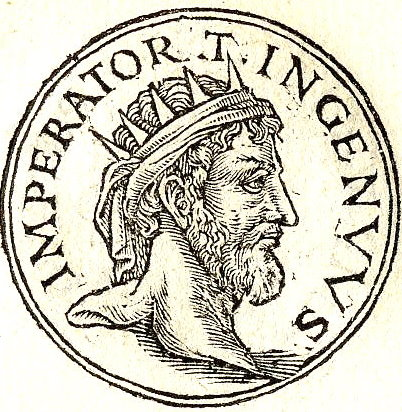
- Ingenuus from Promptuarii Iconum Insigniorum
- Reign: 260 AD
- Predecessor: Valerian
- Successor: Gallienus
- Died: 260 AD; Mursa Major, Pannonia Inferior
Names
- Ingenuus
Regnal name
- Imperator Caesar Ingenuus Augustus

Ingenuus was a Roman military commander, the imperial legate in Pannonia, who became a usurper to the throne of the emperor Gallienus when he led a brief and unsuccessful revolt in the year 260. Appointed by Gallienus himself, Ingenuus served him well by repulsing a Sarmatian invasion and securing the Pannonian border, at least temporarily. Ingenuus had also been charged with the military education of Caesar Cornelius Licinius Valerianus, the young son of Emperor Gallienus, but after the boy's death in 258, his position became perilous.

A well-liked and admired commander, Ingenuus found an opportunity to become the Roman Emperor when Valerian was captured and killed by Shapur I of the Sassanid Empire. Throwing off their allegiance to Valerian's son, the legions of Moesia proclaimed Ingenuus Roman Emperor at Sirmium in 260. Gallienus was in Germania on the Rhine frontier, so he acted quickly by recalling troops from Gaul and after a rapid march he met Ingenuus on the battlefield at Mursa. The troops of Ingenuus were defeated, as Gallienus' general, Aureolus, used the advantage given by the mobility of an improved cavalry component of the army, which was the military innovation the Emperor desired.

Ingenuus died after the battle by drowning himself in a nearby river to avoid capture.

== See also ==
- Jotapian
- Pacatian
- Regalian
- Silbannacus
- Sponsianus
