= Marcia Otacilia Severa =

Roman empress from 244 to 249

- Augusta
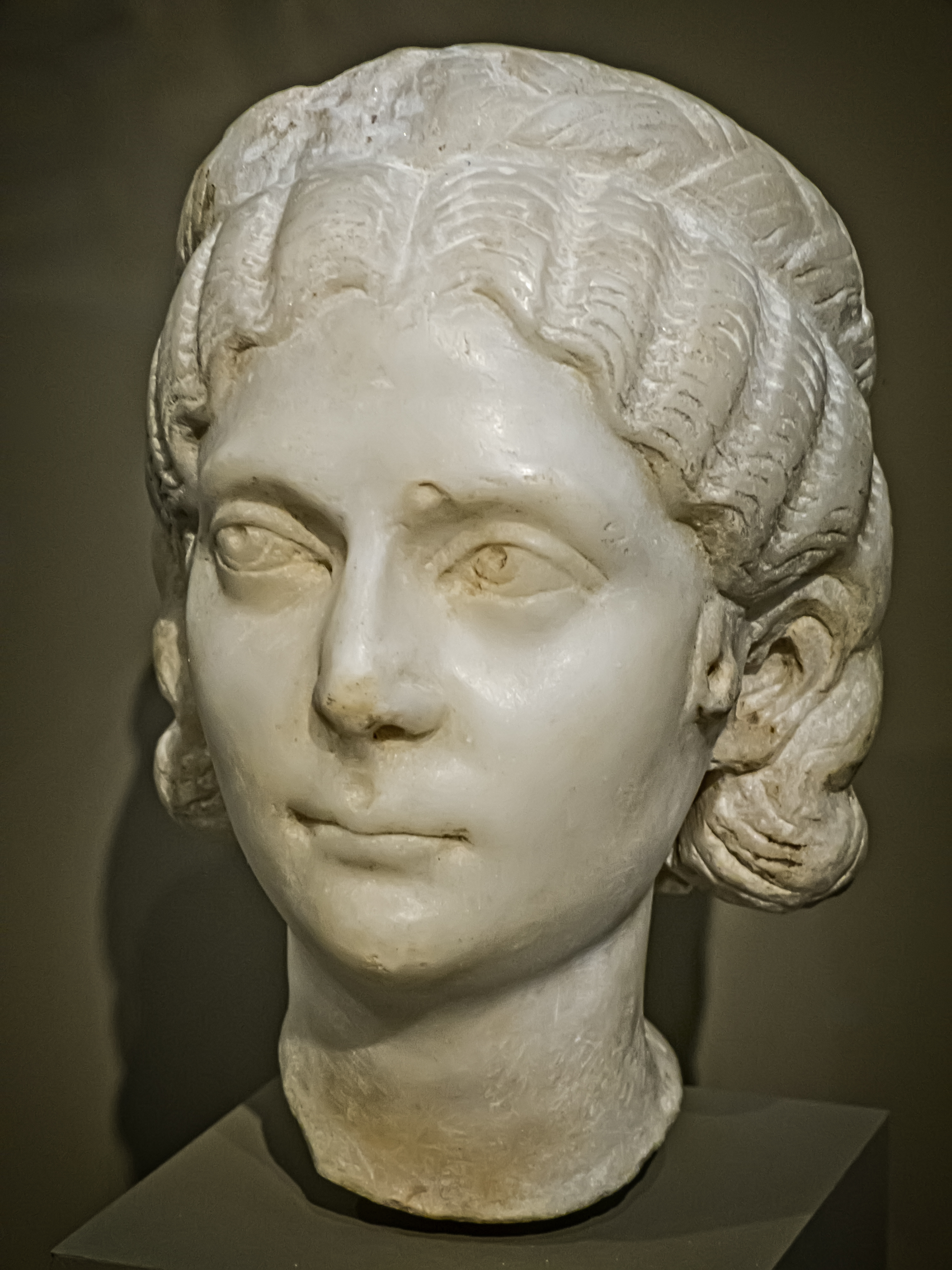
- Possible bust of Otacilia Severa, Walters Art Museum, Baltimore.

Empress of the Roman Empire
- Tenure: 244–249
- Spouse: Philip the Arab
- Issue: Philip II
Names
- Marcia Otacilia Severa
Regnal name
- Marcia Otacilia Severa Augusta
- Father: Possibly named Severianus

Marcia Otacilia Severa was the Roman empress and wife of Emperor Philip the Arab, who reigned over the Roman Empire from 244 to 249. She was the mother of co-emperor Philip II.

== Biography ==
=== Early life ===
Severa is believed to be a member of the ancient gens Otacilia, of consular and senatorial rank. Very little is known of her background and family. The historian Zosimus mentions a relative of the emperor Philip named Severianus who was made commander of the armies in Moesia and Macedonia, this man is generally believed to have been either the father or brother of Severa. The Severianus who is believed to have been governor of Thracia around 244 may be the same person.

The usurper Silbannacus who is recorded as "Mar. Silbannacus" on coinage may have been named "Marcius", if so English historian Maxwell Craven has speculated that it is possible that he was a relative of Severa. On the other hand it has been proposed by philologist Mika Kajava that her name "Marcia" may be a praenomen, and not an indication of kinship to the gens Marcia. He notes that her name has been attested in the forms "Marc. Otacilia Severa" as and "M. Otacilia Severa" as well as leaving out the name entirely, which was common for praenomen, but does not exclude the possibility that the name was a nomen.

=== Marriage ===
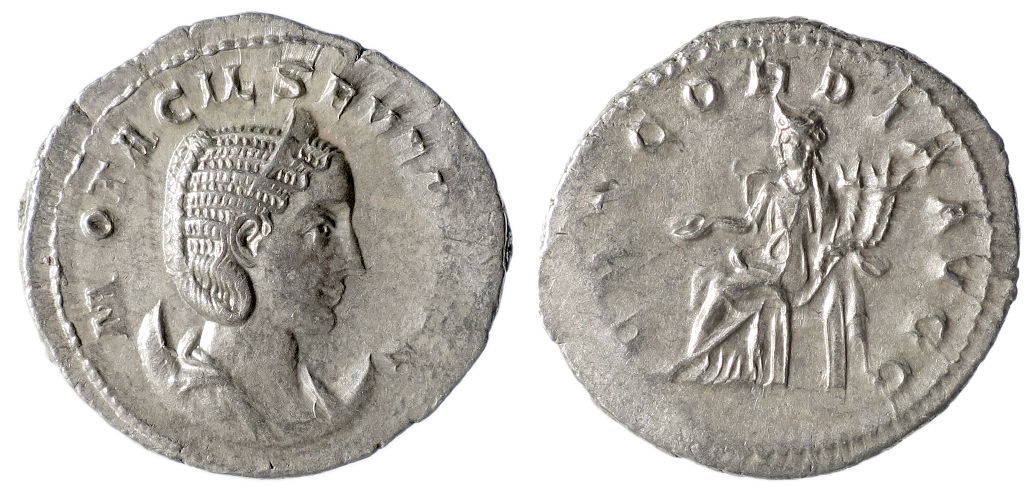
Silver Antoninianus of Otacilia Severa. Inscription: M OTACILIA SEVERA AVG / CONCORDIA AVGG; 247 AD.

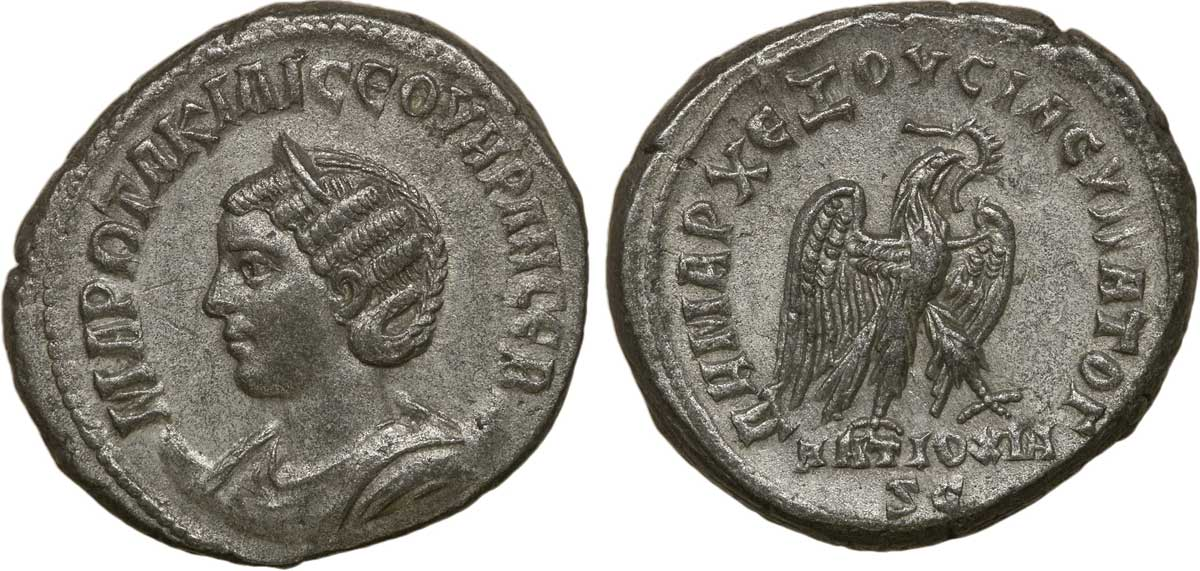
On a tetradrachm of Antioch, Syria, struck AD 247.

Severa married Philip, who was probably serving at the time in the Praetorian Guard under Emperor Alexander Severus. They had at least one child, Marcus Iulius Philippus Severus or Philippus II (born in 238), who later became co-emperor with his father.

In February 244, the emperor Gordianus died in Mesopotamia; it is suspected in the sources that he was murdered, and there is a possibility that Severa was involved in the conspiracy. Her husband Philip became the new emperor, giving Gordian a proper funeral and returning his ashes to Rome for burial. Philip granted their son the title of Caesar and Severa is recorded in inscriptions as Mater Senatus et Patriae ("mother of the senate of the fatherland") and Mater Caesaris ("mother of Caesar").

In August 249, Philip was killed near Verona in battle against Decius, who had been proclaimed Augustus by the Danubian armies. Severa was in Rome; when the news of her husband's death arrived, their son was murdered by the Praetorian Guard still in her arms. Severa survived her husband and son and lived later in obscurity.

Royal titles
Preceded by Tranquillina	Empress of Rome; 244–249	Succeeded by Herennia Etruscilla
