= Jotapian =

3rd-century rebel leader against the Roman emperor Philip the Arab

- Usurper of the Roman Empire
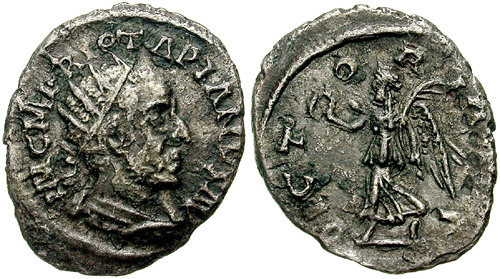
- Antoninianus of Iotapian. The obverse inscription reads im c m f r iotapianus av.
- Reign: c. 249 (against Philip the Arab)
- Predecessor: Philip the Arab
- Successor: Philip the Arab
- Born: Near East
- Died: c. 249
Names
- M(arcus) F(ulvius) Ru(fus) Iotapianus
Regnal name
- Imperator Caesar M(arcus) F(ulvius) Ru(fus) Iotapianus Augustus

Jotapian (/dʒəˈteɪpiən/; Latin: M(arcus) F(ulvius) Ru(fus) Iotapianus; died c. 249) was an usurper in the eastern provinces of the Roman Empire during the reign of Emperor Philip the Arab, around 249. Jotapian is known from his rare coins and from accounts in Aurelius Victor (Caesares xxix.2), Zosimus (i.20.2 and i.21.2), and Polemius Silvius (Laterculus).

== Life ==
=== Origins ===
Jotapian was a member of the Near East indigenous aristocracy. His name is similar to those of Queen Julia Iotapa and her daughter, princess Julia Iotapa of Commagene, so he may have been a member of the royal family of Commagene, which had lost its power in favour of the Romans under Emperor Vespasian in 72.

Aurelius Victor reports that Jotapian claimed descendance from an Alexander. According to some scholars, this refers to Severus Alexander, while other scholars note that King Antiochus I Theos of Commagene claimed to be descended from Macedonian King Alexander the Great. He could be a possible descendant of Gaius Julius Agrippa or his brother Gaius Julius Alexander Berenicianus or his sister Julia Iotapa.

=== Revolt and death ===
Jotapian led a rebellion started in Syria, towards the end of Philip's rule, against the increase in taxation ordered by the rector Orientis Priscus, Philip's brother. Polemius Silvius described Iotapian as a tyrant in Cappadocia. Jotapian made Antioch his capital, but the rebellion came to an end and Jotapian was killed by his own soldiers, possibly during Emperor Decius' rule.

=== Coinage ===
Coins issued by Jotapian had been found. All of them are antoniniani, all of them show a crude design, and all of them have a Victoria Avg reverse, possibly celebrating a victory against Philip's troops or rather "the power of the Emperor to conquer". It has been suggested that Jotapian also issued Aurei, none of which are known to have survived.

The coins are the only source for his names, M. F. Rv., which has been suggested to be Marcus Fulvius Rufus by Théodore Edme Mionnet. Furthermore, their style suggest that the revolt was short and spread over a small territory, since Jotapian controlled no major mint.

== See also ==
- Ingenuus
- Pacatian
- Regalian
- Silbannacus
- Sponsianus
