= Gaius Julius Priscus =

Brother of Roman Emperor Philip the Arab

Gaius Julius Priscus (fl. 3rd century) was a Roman soldier and member of the Praetorian Guard in the reign of Gordian III. As the brother of Roman Emperor Philip the Arab, he was also Prefect of Mesopotamia and Procurator of Macedonia.

Priscus was born in the Roman province of Syria, possibly in Damascus, son of a Julius Marinus, a local Roman citizen, possibly of some importance. The name of his mother is unknown, but his brother was Marcus Julius Philippus, later the Roman Emperor known as "Philip the Arab".

Priscus was probably older than Philip, since the latter's political career was pushed by the former's own influence. According to several inscriptions, Priscus was praefectus of the province of Mesopotamia, a frontier province on the border with Persia, therefore highly militarized. He was the Procurator of Macedonia, second in command to Egypt's governor and held judicial responsibilities in Alexandria. Priscus became a member of the Praetorian Guard around 242 during Gordian's Persian campaign, and, when Timesitheus – the praetorian prefect – died in 243, he convinced the young emperor to substitute him with his own brother Philip. For a year, Priscus and Philip served as de facto regents of the young Gordian.

After Gordian's death in 244, Priscus's brother Philippus became the new emperor. As his brother and trusted ally, Priscus remained in the East, while Philip travelled to Rome. Priscus held supreme power in the Eastern provinces and was referred to in inscriptions as Rector Orientis. His rule was severe and oppressive. Following his brother's directives, Priscus collected heavy taxes that eventually led to rebellion and the uprising of Jotapianus, one of the four usurpers recorded active during Philip's reign. Apparently, Priscus managed to control this rebellion. Nothing is known of Priscus after the outbreak of Jotapianus' revolt.

== Personal life ==
An inscription dedicated to Priscus in Philippopolis named his wife as Tryphoniana and mentions them having a son. It has been proposed that the usurper Titus Julius Priscus might be a son of Gaius, or the same as Gaius himself.
