= Pacatian =

Usurper of the Roman Empire (died c. 248)

- Usurper of the Roman Empire
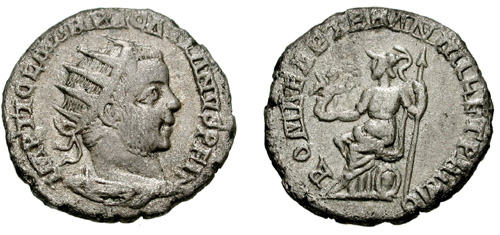
- Obv.: Radiate head, IMP TI CL MAR[INVS ] PACATIANVS P[ΙVS] F[ELIX] IN[VICTVS] (undefeated). Rev.: Rome seated holding Victory and sceptre, ROMAE AETER[ΝΑ] AN[NOS] MIL[LESIMO] ET PRIMO, i.e. year 1001-753 = 248.
- Reign: c. 248 (against Philip the Arab)
- Predecessor: Philip the Arab
- Successor: Philip the Arab
- Died: c. 248
Names
- Tiberius Claudius Marinus Pacatianus
Regnal name
- Imperator Caesar Tiberius Claudius Mar[...] Pacatianus Augustus

Pacatian (/ˈpəkeɪʃ(i)ən/; Latin: Tiberius Claudius Macrinus Pacatianus; died c. 248) was a usurper in the Danube area of the Roman Empire during the time of Philip the Arab.

== Life ==
Pacatianus was one of several Roman soldiers who claimed the office of Roman emperor toward the end of the reign of Emperor Philip the Arab. His praenomen and nomen suggest his ancestors obtained Roman citizenship either during the time of Tiberius or of Claudius.

His life is known from mentions in the histories of Zosimus and Zonaras. However, the chronology of these accounts is obscure, and modern scholars use coinage to establish the timeline of his life and revolt. Zonaras names him as a 'unit commander' of one of the Danube legions, possibly Legio VII Claudia. He was likely a leader in the effort to drive Gothic invaders out of Roman territory in 248, one of the first actions of the Gothic War. Either during this action or soon after he was acclaimed emperor by the Danube legions. Eventually his control extended to the city of Viminacium. According to Zosimus, the news of Pacatian's revolt in Moesia and of Jotapian's near-simultaneous revolt in Syria prompted Philip to make an offer to the Roman Senate to step down. Both Zosimus and Zonoras relate that Philip was advised by the senator Decius, who predicted that Pacatian would soon be killed by his troops. This soon came to pass, and Philip (over Decius' objections) sent Decius to the Danube to find out the causes of the revolt. Decius was promptly acclaimed as emperor by the legions on the Danube, and (though Zonaras records that Decius offered to resign) eventually overcame Philip by the end of 249.

== See also ==
- Ingenuus
- Jotapian
- Regalian
- Silbannacus
- Sponsianus

== Sources ==
=== Ancient Sources ===
- Zonaras, Extracts of History, XXII.19
  - Thomas M. Banchich, ed. (2009). The History of Zonaras: From Alexander Severus to the Death of Theodosius the Great. Translated by Thomas M. Banchiech; Eugene N. Lane. Routledge. pp. 46–48. ISBN 9780415299091.
- Zosimus, Historia Nova, 1.19 ff.
  - Zosimus: New History. Translated by Ronald T. Ridley. Australian Association for Byzantine Studies. 1982. p. 7. ISBN 0959362606.

=== Modern Sources ===
- Körner, Christian (2002). "13.2: Pacatianus". Philippus Arabs: Ein Soldatenkaiser in der Tradition des Antoninisch-Severischen Prinzipats. Untersuchungen zur Antiken Literatur und Geschichte. De Gruyter. pp. 282–288. ISBN 9783110172058.
- Pearson, Paul N (2022). "Chapter 2: Rebels". The Roman Empire in Crisis, 248–260: When the Gods Abandoned Rome. Pen & Sword: Military. ISBN 9781399090971.
- Potter, David S. (1990). Prophecy and History in the Crisis of the Roman Empire: A Historical Commentary on the Thirteenth Sibylline Oracle. Oxford: Clarendon Press. pp. 254–258.
