= Philip the Arab =

Roman emperor from 244 to 249

Philip I
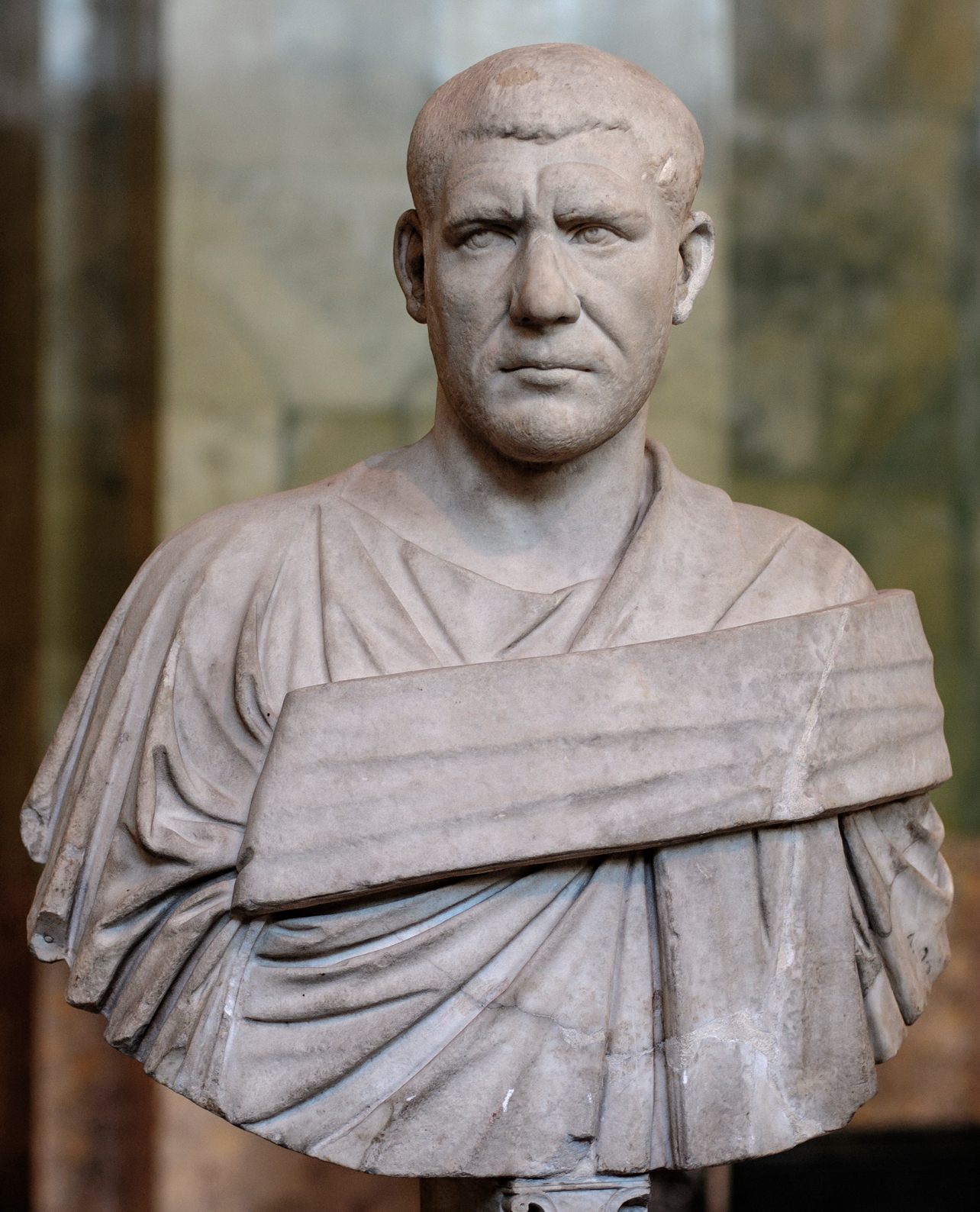
- Bust of Philip I at The State Hermitage Museum in Saint Petersburg, 2010

Roman emperor
- Reign: February 244 – September 249
- Predecessor: Gordian III
- Successor: Decius
- Co-emperor: Philip II (248–249)
- Born: c. 204; Philippopolis, Arabia Petraea, Roman Empire
- Died: September 249 (aged 45); Verona, Italia, Roman Empire
- Spouse: Marcia Otacilia Severa (m. 234)
- Issue: Philippus II; Iulia Severa (or Severina); Quintus Philippus Severus
Names
- Marcus Julius Philippus
Regnal name
- Imperator Caesar Marcus Julius Philippus Augustus
- Father: Julius Marinus
- Religion: Roman paganism (publicly); Christianity (speculated)

Philip I (Latin: Marcus Julius Philippus; c. 204 – September 249), commonly known as Philip the Arab, was the Roman emperor from 244 to 249. Although his reign lasted only five years, it marked an unusually stable period during the Crisis of the Third Century. (Note: "The five years of Philip's reign were a time of uncommon stability and repose in a century notorious for turbulence".) (Note: "Philip's reign was brief – just five years – but it was a stable one in the unstable third century".)

Born in modern-day Shahba, Syria, in what was then Arabia Petraea to a family likely of Arab descent, Philip was praetorian prefect during Emperor Gordian III's campaign against Shapur I's Sasanian Empire. When Gordian died under disputed circumstances following the Battle of Misiche, Philip was proclaimed emperor. He quickly negotiated peace with the Sasanians and returned to Rome to be confirmed by the Senate. In 246, Philip successfully repelled an incursion by the Carpi across the Danube. He then commemorated Rome's first millennium in 248 with a series of large-scale festivals and games.

A series of rebellions and renewed Barbarian incursions broke out from late 248, prompting Philip to dispatch Decius to Moesia and Pannonia. A victorious Decius was proclaimed emperor by his troops and immediately marched on Rome. Philip was defeated at Verona, where he was killed during or shortly after the battle, and Decius was subsequently recognised by the Senate as his successor.

While Philip publicly adhered to the Roman religion, he was later purported to have been a Christian, and in the later half of the 3rd century and into the early 4th century, some Catholic clergymen held the same belief. He was described as such in many published works that became widely known during the Middle Ages. Consequently, Philip's religious affiliation remains a divisive topic in modern scholarly debate about his life.

== Early life ==
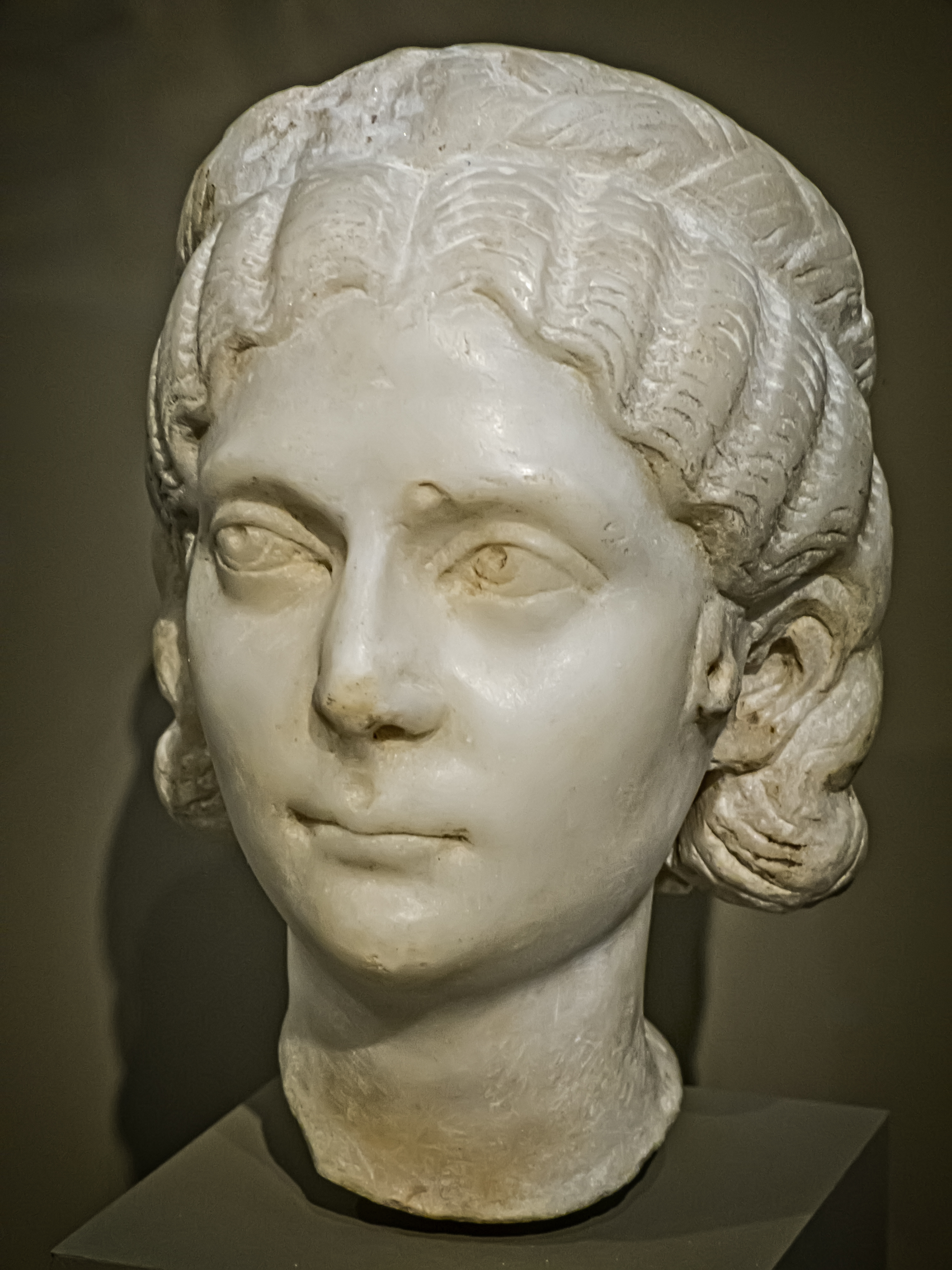
Possible bust of Otacilia Severa, wife of Philip.

Little is known about Philip's early life and political career. He was born in what is today Shahba, Syria, about 90 km (56 mi) southeast of Damascus, in Trachonitis. His birth city, later renamed Philippopolis, lay within Aurantis, an Arab district which at the time was part of the Roman province of Arabia Petraea. Most historians accept that Philip was indeed an ethnic Arab. He was the son of a local citizen, Julius Marinus, possibly of some importance. Allegations from later Roman sources (Historia Augusta and Epitome de Caesaribus) that Philip had a very humble origin or even that his father was a leader of brigands are not accepted by modern historians. His birth date is not recorded by contemporary sources, but the 7th-century Chronicon Paschale records that he died at the age of 45.

While the name of Philip's mother is unknown, he had a brother, Gaius Julius Priscus, an equestrian and a member of the Praetorian Guard under Gordian III (238–244). Philip was married to Marcia Otacilia Severa, the daughter of a Roman governor. They had a son, Philip II, born in 237 or 238.

The rise to the purple of the Severans from nearby Emesa is noted as a motivational factor in Philip's own ascent because of the geographic and ethnic similarity between himself and the Emesan emperors. (Note: "Severus deserves the ultimate credit for making possible the emergence of a figure such as Philip".) (Note: "The spectacle of Arab and half-Arab emperors from neighboring Emesa must have left a deep impression on Marcus Julius Philippus".)

== Accession to the throne ==
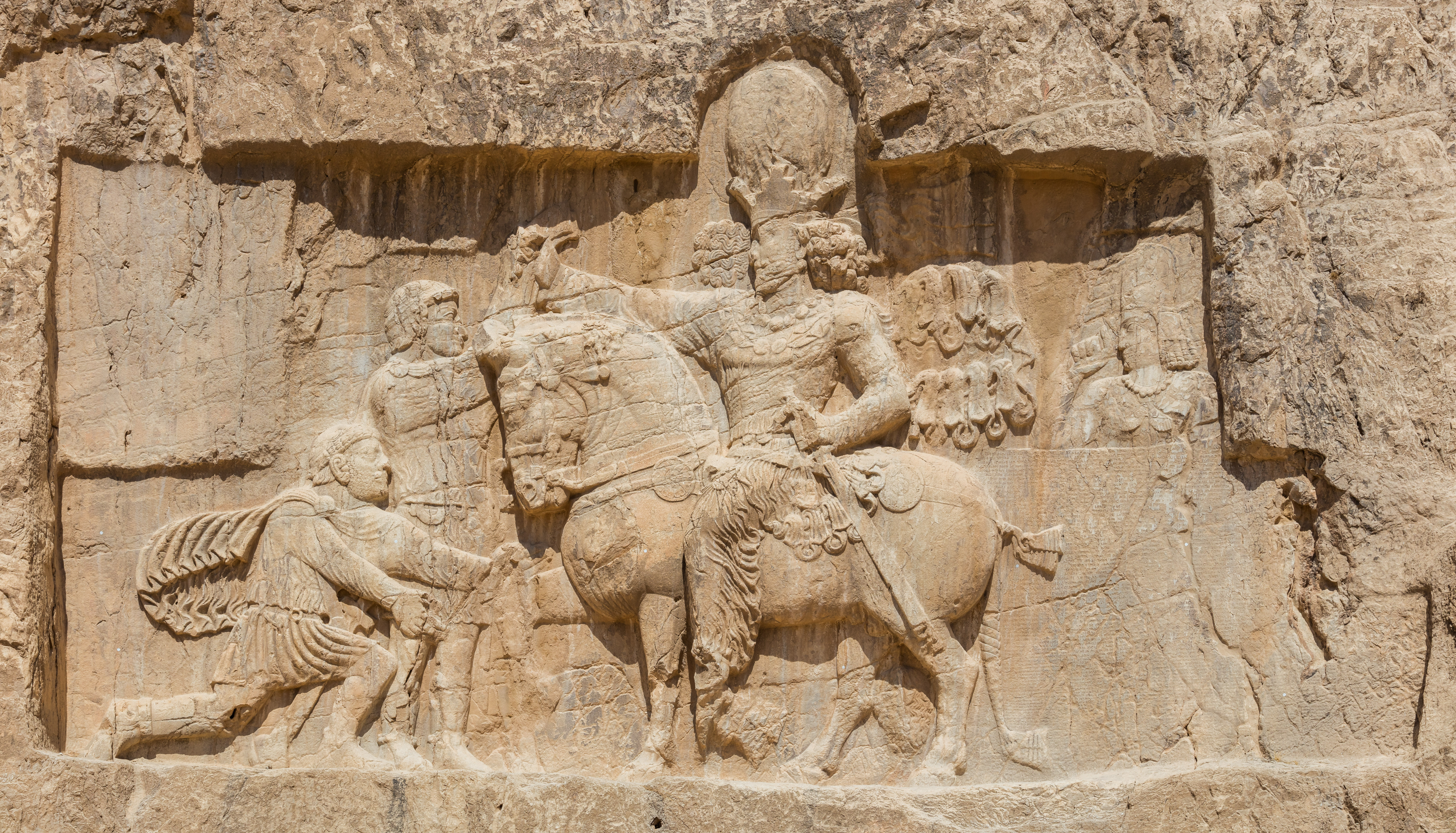
Rock-face relief at Naqsh-e Rostam of Shapur I (on horseback) with Valerian standing and Philip kneeling in surrender to the Persian king. (Note: The two emperors who are named are shown in the way they are described: Philip the Arab is kneeling, asking for peace, and Valerian is physically taken prisoner by Šāpur. Consequently, the relief must be made after 260 AD.") (Note: "(...) while another figure, probably Philip the Arab, kneels, and the Sasanian king holds the ill-fated Emperor Valerian by his wrist".) (Note: "He recorded these deeds for posterity in both words and images at Naqsh-i Rustam and on the Ka'aba-i Zardušt near the ancient Achaemenid capital of Persepolis, preserving for us a vivid image of two Roman emperors, one kneeling (probably Philip the Arab, also defeated by Shapur) and the second (Valerian), uncrowned and held captive at the wrist by a gloriously mounted Persian king".)

Philip's rise to prominence began through the intervention of his brother Priscus, who was an important official under Emperor Gordian III. His major break came in 243, during Gordian's campaign against Shapur I of Persia, when the praetorian prefect, Timesitheus, died under unclear circumstances. At the suggestion of his brother Priscus, Philip became the new Praetorian prefect, with the intention that the two brothers would control the young emperor and rule the Roman world as unofficial regents. Following a military defeat, Gordian died in February 244 under circumstances that are still debated. While some claim that Philip conspired in his murder, other accounts (including one coming from the Persian point of view) state that Gordian died in battle. Whatever the case, Philip assumed the purple robe following Gordian's death.

Philip was not willing to repeat the mistakes of previous claimants and was aware that he had to return to Rome to secure his position with the Senate. However, his first priority was to conclude a peace treaty with Shapur, and withdraw the army from a potentially disastrous situation. Although Philip was accused of abandoning territory, the actual terms of the peace were not as humiliating as they could have been. He paid 500,000 denarii to the Sasanian Empire and immediately issued coins proclaiming that he had made peace with the Persians (pax fundata cum Persis).

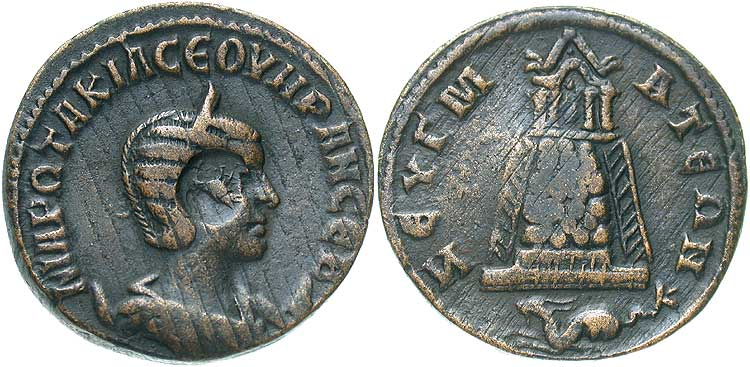
Coin of Severa. Legend: ΜΑΡ. ΩΤΑΚΙΛ. CEOΥHPAN CEB. / ZEYΓMATEΩN. Greek inscription in ACC for MAR. OTACIL. SEVERAM AVG. / (of) citizens of ZEVGMA.

Leading his army back up the Euphrates, south of Circesium, Philip erected a cenotaph in honor of Gordian III, but his ashes were sent ahead to Rome, where he arranged for Gordian III's deification. Whilst in Antioch, he left his brother Priscus as extraordinary ruler of the Eastern provinces, with the title of rector Orientis. Moving westward, he gave his brother-in-law Severianus control of the provinces of Moesia and Macedonia. He arrived in Rome in the late summer of 244, where he was confirmed augustus. Before the end of the year, he nominated his young son caesar (heir), his wife, Marcia Otacilia Severa, was named augusta, and his father Marinus had been deified despitte never having been emperor. While in Rome, Philip also claimed a victory over the Persians with the titles of Persicus Maximus, Parthicus Maximus and Parthicus Adiabenicus, the last probably unofficially.

== Reign ==
In an attempt to shore up his regime, Philip put a great deal of effort into maintaining good relations with the Senate, and from the beginning of his reign, he reaffirmed the old Roman virtues and traditions. He quickly ordered an enormous building program in his home town, renamed it Philippopolis and raised it to civic status, and he populated it with statues of himself and his family. He also introduced the Actia-Dusaria Games in Bostra, the capital of Arabia. This festival combined the worship of Dushara, the main Nabataean deity, with commemoration of the Battle of Actium as part of the Roman Imperial cult.

The creation of the new city of Philippopolis, piled on top of the massive tribute owed to the Persians, as well as the necessary donativum to the army to secure its acceptance of his accession, made Philip desperately short of money. To pay for it, he ruthlessly increased levels of taxation and ceased paying subsidies to the tribes north of the Danube that were vital for keeping the peace on the frontiers. Both decisions would have significant impacts upon the empire and his reign. It was also reported that Phillip took measures to ban male prostitution, but the prohibition lasted only briefly.

=== At the frontiers of the Roman Empire ===
In 245, Philip was forced to leave Rome as the stability established by Timesitheus was undone by a combination of his death, Gordian's defeat in the east, and Philip's decision to cease paying the subsidies. The Carpi moved through Dacia, crossed the Danube, and emerged in Moesia, where they threatened the Balkans. Establishing his headquarters in Philippopolis in Thrace, he pushed the Carpi across the Danube and chased them back into Dacia, so that by the summer of 246, he claimed victory against them, along with the title "Carpicus Maximus". In the meantime, the Arsacids of Armenia refused to acknowledge the authority of the Persian king Shapur I, and war with Persia flared up again by 245.

=== Ludi Saeculares ===
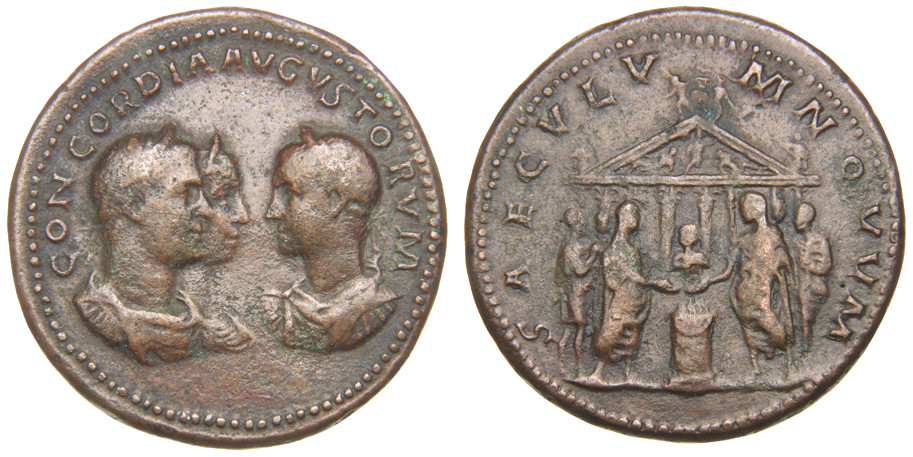
Medallion commemorating Rome's millennium. Legend: concordia augustorum / saeculum novum ("harmony of the emperors, new era").

Nevertheless, Philip was back in Rome by August 247, where he poured more money into the most momentous event of his reign, the Ludi Saeculares, which coincided with the one thousandth anniversary of the foundation of Rome. In April 248 AD (April 1001 A.U.C.), Philip had the honor of leading the celebrations of the thousandth birthday of Rome, which according to the empire's official Varronian chronology was founded on 21 April 753 BC by Romulus.

Commemorative coins, such as the one illustrated at the left, were issued in large numbers and, according to contemporary accounts, the festivities were magnificent and included spectacular games, ludi saeculares, and theatrical presentations throughout the city. In the Colosseum, in what had been originally prepared for Gordian III's planned Roman triumph over the Persians, more than 1,000 gladiators were killed along with hundreds of exotic animals including hippos, leopards, lions, giraffes, and one rhinoceros. The events were also celebrated in literature, with several publications, including Asinius Quadratus' History of a Thousand Years, specially prepared for the anniversary. At the same time, Philip elevated his son to the rank of co-augustus.

== Downfall ==
Despite the festive atmosphere, there were continued problems in the provinces. In late 248, the legions of Pannonia and Moesia, dissatisfied with the result of the war against the Carpi, rebelled and proclaimed Tiberius Claudius Pacatianus emperor. The resulting confusion tempted the Quadi and other Germanic tribes to cross the frontier and raid Pannonia. At the same time, the Goths invaded Moesia and Thrace across the Danube frontie, and laid siege to Marcianopolis, as the Carpi, encouraged by the Gothic incursions, renewed their assaults in Dacia and Moesia. Meanwhile, in the east, Marcus Jotapianus led another uprising in response to the oppressive rule of Priscus and the excessive taxation of the eastern provinces. Other usurpers, like Marcus Silbannacus are reported to have started rebellions without much success.

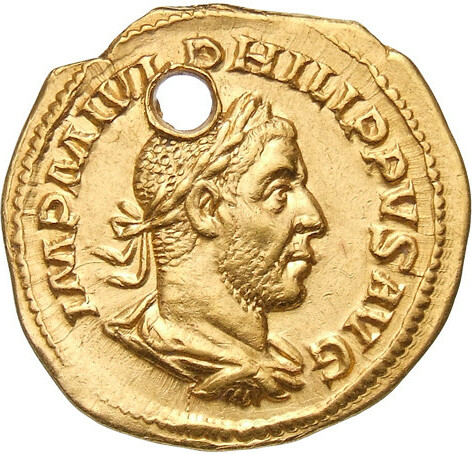
Aureus of Philip.

Overwhelmed by the number of invasions and usurpers, Philip offered to resign, but the Senate decided to throw its support behind the emperor, with a certain Gaius Messius Quintus Decius most vocal of all senators. Philip was so impressed by his support that he dispatched Decius to the region with a special command, encompassing all of the Pannonian and Moesian provinces. That had the purposes of quelling the rebellion of Pacatianus and dealing with the barbarian incursions.

Although Decius managed to quell the revolt, discontent in the legions was growing. Decius was proclaimed emperor by the Danubian armies in the spring of 249 and immediately marched on Rome. However, even before he had left the region, the situation for Philip had turned even more sour. Financial difficulties had forced him to debase the antoninianus, as rioting began to occur in Egypt, which caused disruptions to Rome's wheat supply and further eroded Philip's support in the capital.

Although Decius tried to come to terms with Philip, the latter's army met the usurper near what is now Verona that summer. Decius easily won the battle, and Philip was killed sometime in September 249 in the fighting or was assassinated by his own soldiers, who were eager to please the new ruler. Philip's eleven-year-old son and heir may have been killed with his father, and Priscus disappeared without a trace.

== Attitude towards Christianity ==
Some later traditions held that Philip was a Christian emperor. The historian Eusebius of Caesarea in his Ecclesiastical History (Ecc. Hist. VI.34), relates traditions that Philip was a Christian but was not allowed to enter Easter vigil services until he confessed his sins and was ordered to sit among the penitents, which he did willingly. Later versions located this event in Antioch. Jerome (De Vir. ill. 54) first explicitly called Philip "the first Christian emperor".

However, historians generally identify the later Emperor Constantine, who was baptized on his deathbed, as the first Christian emperor, and generally describe Philip's adherence to Christianity as dubious because non-Christian writers did not mention the fact, and throughout his reign, Philip, to all appearances (coinage etc.), continued to follow the Roman state religion. Critics ascribe Eusebius's claim to Philip's tolerant attitude towards Christians.

== Sources ==
=== Primary sources ===
- Aurelius Victor, Epitome de Caesaribus
- Orosius, Histories against the Pagans, vii.20
- Joannes Zonaras, Compendium of History extract: Zonaras: Alexander Severus to Diocletian: 222–284
- Zosimus, Historia Nova

=== Secondary sources ===
- Ball, Warwick (2000). Rome in the East : the Transformation of an Empire. London New York: Routledge. ISBN 978-0203023228. OCLC 49414893.
- Bowman, Alan; Cameron, Averil; Garnsey, Peter, eds. (8 September 2005). The Cambridge Ancient History. Vol. 12, The crisis of Empire, AD 193–337. Cambridge University Press. doi:10.1017/chol9780521301992. ISBN 978-1139053921. OCLC 828737952.
- Bowersock, Glenn Warren (1983). Roman Arabia. Cambridge, MA, US: Harvard University Press. ISBN 978-0674777552. OCLC 1245763862 – via Internet Archive.
- Meckler, Michael L. (7 June 1999). "Philip the Arab (244–249 A.D.)". De Imperatoribus Romanis: An Online Encyclopedia of Roman Emperors.
- Potter, David Stone (2004). The Roman Empire at Bay : AD 180–395. London; New York: Routledge. ISBN 978-0203401170. OCLC 52430927.
- Shahîd, Irfan (1984). Rome and the Arabs : a prolegomenon to the study of Byzantium and the Arabs. Washington, DC: Dumbarton Oaks Research Library and Collection. ISBN 978-0884021155. OCLC 1245769052 – via Internet Archive.
- Southern, Pat (2001). The Roman Empire from Severus to Constantine. London New York: Routledge. ISBN 978-0415239431. OCLC 46421874.

Regnal titles
Preceded by Gordian III	Roman emperor 244–249	Succeeded by Decius
Political offices
Preceded by Ti. Pollienus Armenius Peregrinus, Fulvius Aemilianus	Roman consul 245 with C. Maesius Titianus	Succeeded by Gaius Bruttius Praesens, C. Allius Albinus
Preceded by Gaius Bruttius Praesens, C. Allius Albinus	Roman consuls 247–248 with Philippus II	Succeeded by L. Fulvius Gavius Numisius Aemilianus, L. Naevius Aquilinus
