= Philip II (Roman emperor) =

Roman emperor from 247 to 249

- Augustus
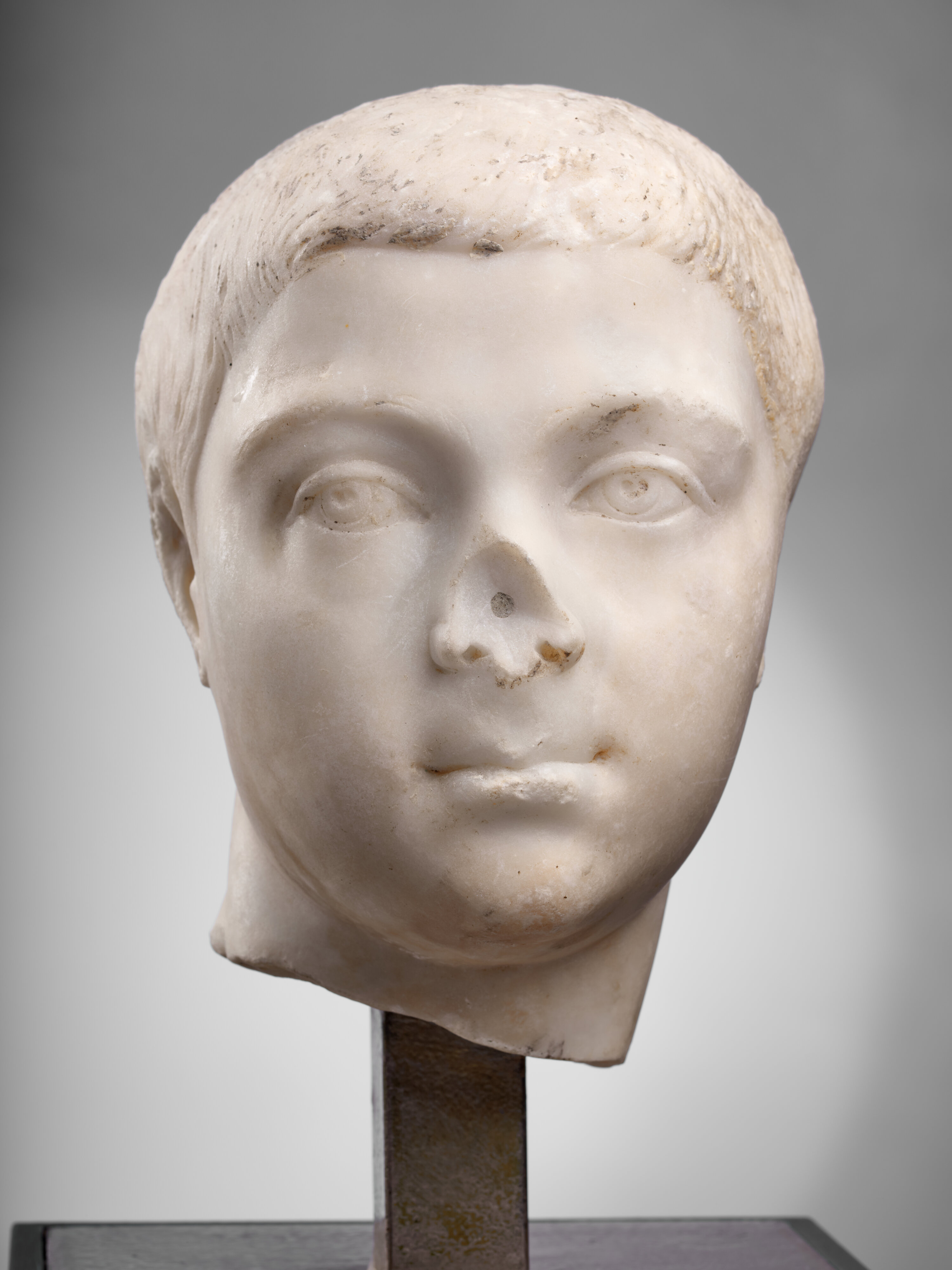
- Bust, Musée Saint-Raymond, Toulouse

Roman emperor
- Reign: 247–249
- Predecessor: Philip the Arab (alone)
- Successor: Decius
- Co-emperor: Philip the Arab
- Born: 237
- Died: 249 (aged 12); Rome, Italy
Names
- Marcus Julius Severus Philippus
Regnal name
- Imperator Caesar Marcus Julius Severus Philippus Augustus
- Father: Philip the Arab
- Mother: Marcia Otacilia Severa

Philip II (Latin: Marcus Julius Severus Philippus; 237 – 249), also known as Philip the Younger, was Roman emperor from 247 to 249, ruling jointly under his father Philip I.

== Life ==
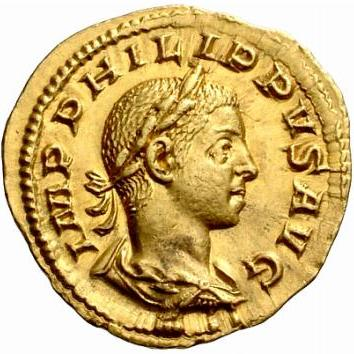
Aureus of Philip II

When his father became emperor in 244, the 7-year-old Philip was appointed caesar. In 247 he became consul, and was later elevated by his father to the rank of augustus and co-ruler. The thousandth anniversary of the founding of Rome occurred during their reign and great games and spectacles were held for the occasion.

Ancient historians say that Philip the Arab and Philip II were both killed in battle by Decius in 249. Modern historians say that when news of Philip the Arab's death reached Rome, Philip II was murdered by the Praetorian Guard at the age of twelve. Some argue that Philip II was sole ruler of the empire for the fall of 249.

The Medieval Catholic work Golden Legend, claims that he and his father became Christians, possibly converted by Origen, and that Phillip II died a Martyr. The historicity of this event is debated by scholars.

Regnal titles
Preceded by Philip the Arab	Roman Emperor; 247–249; Served alongside: Philip the Arab	Succeeded by Decius
Political offices
Preceded by Gaius Bruttius Praesens, C. Allius Albinus	Roman consul 247–248 with Philip the Arab	Succeeded by L. Fulvius Gavius Numisius Aemilianus, L. Naevius Aquilinus
