= Karl Neumann =

Karl Neumann may refer to:

- Karl Friedrich Neumann (1793–1870), German orientalist
- Karl Eugen Neumann (1865–1915), translated Buddhist scriptures into German
- Karl August Neumann (1771–1866), German-Austrian chemist
- Karl Johannes Neumann (1857–1917), German classical historian
- Carl Neumann (1832–1925), German mathematician
- Carl Magnus Neumann (born 1944), saxophonist
