= Philip the Arab and Christianity =

Aspect of the Roman emperor's life

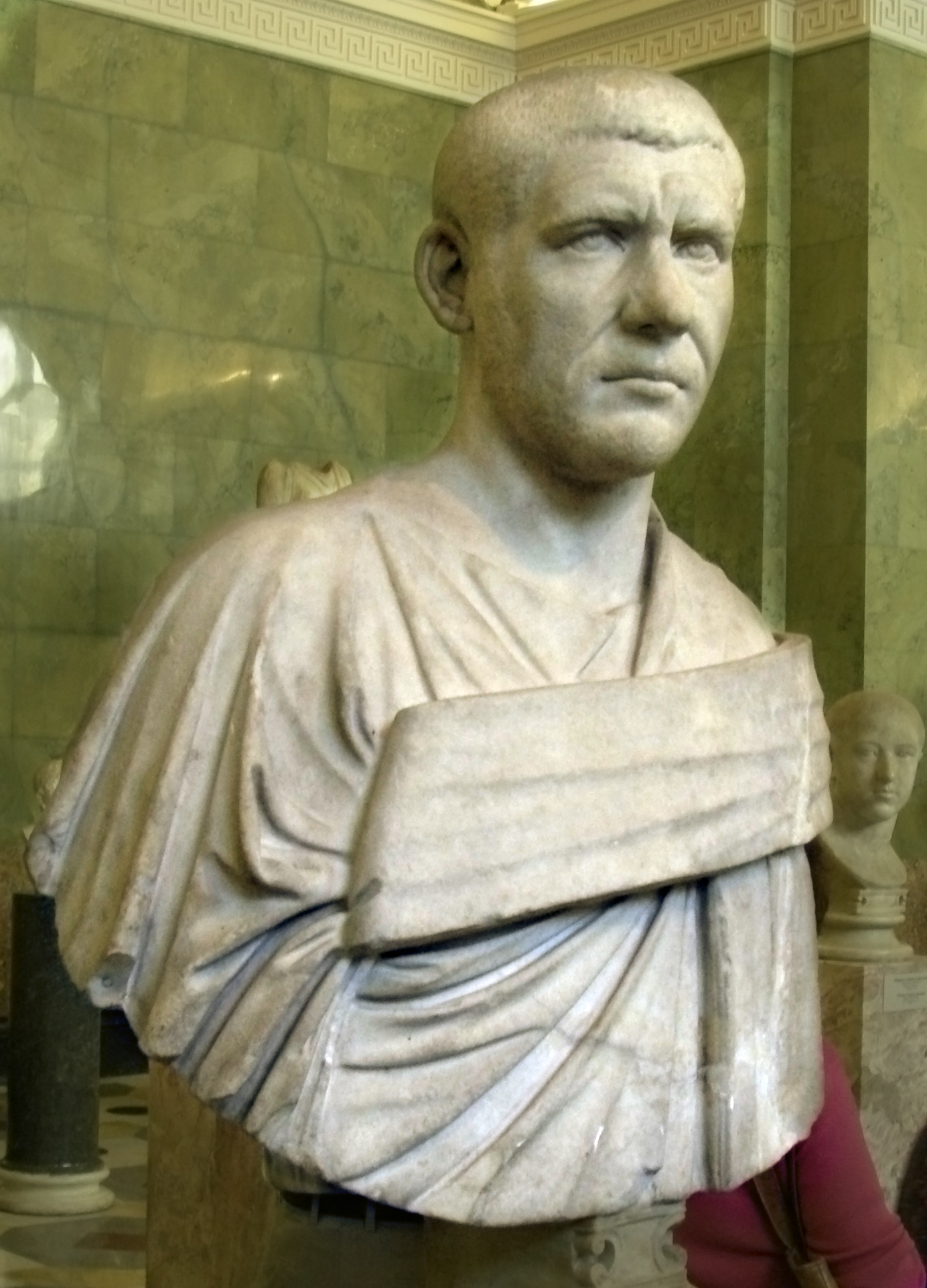
A bust of Philip the Arab from the Hermitage Museum

Philip the Arab was a 3rd-century Roman emperor who was sympathetic to Christians although his relationship with Christianity is obscure and controversial. Philip was born in Auranitis, an Arab district in Syria, east of the Sea of Galilee (modern-day Shahba). The urban and hellenized centers of the region were Christianized in the early years of the 3rd century by major Christian centers at Bosra and Edessa, but there is little evidence of Christian presence in the small villages of the region in this period, such as Philip's birthplace at Philippopolis. Philip served as praetorian prefect, commander of the Praetorian Guard, from 242 and was made emperor in 244. In 249, after a brief civil war, he was killed at the hands of his successor, Decius.

During the latter half of the 3rd century and into the early 4th century, it was held by some churchmen that Philip had been the first Christian emperor. He was described as such in Jerome's Chronicon (Chronicle), which was well known during the Middle Ages, and in Paulus Orosius's highly popular Historia Adversus Paganos (History Against the Pagans). Most scholars hold that those and other early accounts ultimately derive from Eusebius of Caesarea's Historia Ecclesiastica (Ecclesiastical History).

The most important section of Eusebius's Historia on Philip's religious beliefs describes the emperor's visit to a church during the Easter vigil when he was denied entry by the presiding bishop until he confessed his sins. The account is paralleled by John Chrysostom's homily, which celebrates Saint Babylas, Bishop of Antioch, for denying a sinful emperor entry to his church, and by quotations of Leontius in the Chronicon Paschale, which describe Philip seeking penitence from Babylas for the sin of murdering his predecessor. Given the parallels between the accounts, most scholars believe that Eusebius, Chrysostom, and Leontius are referring to the same event.

With the growth of scholarly criticism in the 17th and the 18th centuries, more historians are questioning Philip's Christian affiliations. Historians had become increasingly aware of secular texts, which did not describe Philip as a Christian and indeed recorded him participating as pontifex maximus (chief priest) over the millennial Secular Games in 248. Modern scholars are divided on the issue. Some like Hans Pohlsander and Ernst Stein argue that the ecclesiastic narratives are ambiguous, based on oral rumor, and do not vouch for Philip as a Christian. Others like John York, Irfan Shahîd, and Warwick Ball argue that the ecclesiastic narratives are clear and dependable enough that Philip can be described as a Christiané Still others like Glen Bowersock argue that the sources are strong enough to describe Philip as a man interested in and sympathetic to Christianity but not strong enough to call him a Christian.

== Background ==
=== Biography of Philip the Arab ===
Philip was born in a village in Auranitis, part of the district of Trachonitis, east of the Sea of Galilee in Palestine. Philip renamed the village Philippopolis (now Shahba, Syria) during his reign as Roman emperor. He was one of only three Easterners to be made emperor before the decisive separation of the Eastern and Western Roman Empire in 395. (The other two were Elagabalus and Alexander Severus). Even among easterners, Philip was atypical, as he was an Arab, not a Greek. His father was Julius Marinus; nothing besides his name is known, but the name indicates that he held Roman citizenship and that he must have been prominent in his community.

The early details of Philip's career are obscure, but his brother, Gaius Julius Priscus, was made praetorian prefect under Emperor Gordian III (r. 238–44). If a fragmentary inscription (Inscriptiones Latinae Selectae 1331) refers to Priscus, he would have moved through several equestrian offices (that is, administrative positions open to a member of the equestrian order) during Gordian's reign. In the spring of 242, Philip himself was made praetorian prefect, most likely with the help of his brother. Following a failed campaign against Persia in the winter of 243–244, Gordian died in camp. Rumors that Philip had murdered him were taken up by the senatorial opposition of the late 3rd century and survive in the Latin histories and epitomes of the period. Philip was acclaimed emperor and was secure in that title by late winter 244. Philip made his brother rector Orientis, an executive position with extraordinary powers, including command of the armies in the eastern provinces. Philip began his reign by negotiating a peaceful end to his predecessor's war against Persia. In 248, Philip called the Secular Games to celebrate the 1000-year anniversary of the founding of Rome.

In the Near East, the tax collection methods of Philip's brother Priscus methods provoked the revolt of Jotapianus. At the same time, Silbannacus started a rebellion in the Rhenish provinces. He faced a third rebellion in 248, when the legions that he had used in successful campaigns against the Carpi, on the Danubian frontier, revolted and proclaimed emperor an officer named Pacatianus. All three rebellions were suppressed quickly. In 249, to restore order after the defeat of Pacatianus, Philip gave Senator Decius, a native of the region, command of the Danubian armies. In late spring 249, the armies proclaimed Decius as emperor. The civil war that followed ended in a battle outside Verona. Decius emerged victorious, and Philip either died or was assassinated. When news of Philip's death had reached Rome, the Praetorian Guard murdered his son and successor, Marcus Julius Severus Philippus.

==== Christianity and Philip's early life and career ====
No account or allusion to Philip's presumed conversion to Christianity survives. The Byzantinist and Arabist Irfan Shahîd, who argues in favor of Philip's Christianity in Rome and the Arabs, assumes that he had been a Christian before becoming emperor. He argues, therefore, that there is no need to explain the absence of evidence for Philip's conversion in contemporary Christian literature. Trachonitis, equidistant from Antioch in the north and Bosra in the south and sited on a road connecting the two, could have been Christianized from either direction. Even if he was not himself Christian, Philip would probably have been familiar with Christians in his hometown, as well as Bosra and other nearby settlements. Hans Pohlsander, a classicist and historian arguing against accounts of Philip's Christianity, allows that Philip "may have been curious about a religion which had its origins in an area so close to his place of birth. As an eastern provincial rather than an Italian, he may not have been so intense in his commitment to the traditional Roman religion that he could not keep an open mind on other religions." He also accepts that Philippopolis probably contained a Christian congregation during Philip's childhood. For the scholar of religion Frank Trombley, however, the absence of evidence for the early Christianization of Philippopolis causes to unmerited Shahîd's assumption that Philip was a Christian from early childhood.

If Philip had been a Christian during his military service, he would have not been a particularly unusual figure for his era. Although membership in the army was prohibited by certain churchmen and would have required participation in rites that some Christians found sacrilegious, it was not uncommon among the Christian laity. The position of an emperor, however, was more explicitly pagan since emperors were expected to officiate over public rites and lead the religious ceremonies of the army. Christian scripture contains explicit prohibitions on that sort of behavior such as the First Commandment: "You shall have no other gods before me". (Note: Jews, who faced the same prohibitions on "idolatry" and "false gods," were granted exemptions from Roman military service and public religion.) Whatever the prohibitions, people raised on the "more tolerant Christianity of the camp" would have been able to justify participation in pagan ritual to themselves. Such people existe since the historical record includes Christian army officers, who would have been regularly guilty of idolatry, and the military martyrs of the late 3rd century. Their ritual sacrifice excluded them from certain parts of the Christian community (ecclesiastical writers tended to ignore them, for example), but such people believed themselves to be Christians and were recognized by others as such.

=== Christianity in Auranitis ===
Thanks to its proximity to the first Christian communities of Palestine, Provincia Arabia, which included Philippopolis, was among the first regions to convert to Christianity. By the time of Philip's birth, the region had been extensively Christianized, especially in the north and in hellenized settlements like those of Auranitis. The region is known to have had a fully developed synodal system (in which bishops from the dioceses in the region met to discuss church affairs) by the mid-3rd century. The region sent six bishops to the Council of Nicaea in 325, and Eusebius's Onomasticon, a gazetteer of biblical placenames, records a wholly Christian village called Cariathaim, or Caraiatha, near Madaba. Outside of the cities, however, there is less evidence of Christianization. Before the 5th century, there is little evidence of the faith, and many villages remained unconverted in the 6th century. Philippopolis, which was a small village for most of the period, does not have a Christian inscription that can be dated earlier than 552. It is not known when the village established a prelateship, but it must have been sometime before 451, when it sent a bishop to the Council of Chalcedon.

Christian beliefs had been present in the region's Arab community since about AD 200, when Abgar VIII, an ethnic Arab and king of the Roman client state of Osroene, converted to Christianity. The ethnicity of Abgar is disputed, however, because he is often considered to be an Aramean or Assyrian, rather than an Arab. The religion was propagated from Abgar's capital at Edessa until its destruction in 244. By the mid-3rd century, Bosra, the capital of Provincia Arabia, had a Christian bishop, Beryllos, who offers an early example of the heretical beliefs that Hellenic Christians imputed to the Arabs as a race. Beryllos believed that Christ did not exist before he was made flesh at the Incarnation. According to Eusebius, his views were condemned as heresy following a debate at a local synod. The debate was most likely conducted in Greek, a language in common use among the hellenized cities of the region. (Note: The large cities of Auranitis were hellenized since the mid-3rd century, 14 cities of the Hauran, including Philippopolis, were minting coins in Greek and Latin. A mass of inscriptions in colloquial Greek also give evidence for contemporary linguistic practice.)

=== Christianity in the mid-3rd century ===
The 3rd century was the age in which the initiative for persecution shifted from the masses to the imperial office. In the 1st and the2nd centuries, persecutions were carried out under the authority of local government officials. Septimius Severus (r. 193–211) and Maximin (r. 235–38) are alleged to have issued general rescripts against the religion and targeted its clergy, but the evidence for their acts is obscure and contested. There is no evidence that Philip effected any changes to the Christians' legal status. Pogroms against the Christians in Alexandria took place while Philip was still emperor. There is no evidence that Philip punished, participated in, or assisted the pogrom.

No historian contests that Philip's successor, Decius (r. 249–251), called a general persecution against the church, and most would list it as the first. Decius was anxious to secure himself in the imperial office. Before mid-December 249, Decius issued an edict demanding that all Romans throughout the empire to make a show of sacrifice to the gods. Libelli were signed in Fayum in June and July 250 as demonstrations of the sacrifice. If the persecutions of Maximin and Septimius Severus are dismissed as fiction, Decius's edict was without precedent. If the Christians were believed to be Philip's friends (as Dionysius of Alexandria presents them), however, that might help explain Decius's motivations.

== In Greek ecclesiastical writings ==
The ancient traditions regarding Philip's Christianity can be divided into three categories: the Eusebian, or Caesarean; the Antiochene; and the Latin. The Eusebian tradition consists of Eusebius's Historia Ecclesiastica and the documents excerpted and cited therein, including the letters of Origen and Dionysius, bishop of Alexandria. The Antiochene tradition consists of John Chrysostom's homily de S. Babyla and the entries of Leontius, bishop of Antioch, in the Chronicon Paschale. Most scholars hold that those accounts ultimately derive from Eusebius's Historia Ecclesiastica (Ecclesiastical History), but some, like Irfan Shahîd, posit that Antioch had an independent oral tradition.

=== Eusebius ===
The most significant author to discuss Philip the Arab and Christianity is Eusebius, who served as bishop of Caesarea in Roman Palestine from ca. 314 to his death in 339. Eusebius's major work is the Historia Ecclesiastica, written in several editions dating from ca. 300 to 325. The Historia is not an attempt at a full history of the Church in the classical style, but rather a collection of facts addressing six topics in Christian history from the Apostolic times to the late 3rd century: (1) lists of bishops of major sees; (2) Christian teachers and their writings; (3) heresies; (4) the tribulations of the Jews; (5) the persecutions of Christians by pagan authorities; and (6) the martyrs. His Vita Constantini, written between Constantine's death in 337 and Eusebius's own death in 339, is a combination of eulogistic encomium and continuation of the Historia (the two separate documents were combined and distributed by Eusebius's successor, Acacius of Caesarea).

Five references in Eusebius's Historia Ecclesiastica speak to Philip's Christianity; three directly, two by implication. At 6.34, he describes Philip visiting a church on Easter Vigil and being denied entry by the unnamed presiding bishop because he had not yet confessed his sins. At 6.36.3, he writes of letters from the Christian theologian Origen to Philip and to Philip's wife, Marcia Otacilia Severa. At 6.39, Eusebius writes that Decius persecuted Christians because he hated Philip. The remaining two references are quotations or paraphrases of Dionysius, bishop of Alexandria, a contemporary of Philip who held the patriarchate from 247 to 265. At 6.41.9, Dionysius contrasts the tolerant Philip's rule with the intolerant Decius. At 7.10.3, Dionysius implies that both Alexander Severus (emperor from 222 to 235) and Philip were openly Christian.

==== Philip's visit to the church ====
===== Text, sources, and interpretation =====
Most arguments regarding Philip's Christianity hinge on Eusebius's account of the emperor's visit to a church at 6.34. In the words of the 17th-century ecclesiastical historian Louis-Sébastien Le Nain de Tillemont, it is the la ſeule action en laquelle on ſache qu'il ait honoré l'Église (the "only action in which we know him to have honored the Church.")

Ἔτεσιν δὲ ὅλοις ἓξ Γορδιανοῦ τὴν Ῥωμαίων διανύσαντος ἡγεμονίαν, Φίλιππος ἅμα παιδὶ Φιλίππῳ τὴν ἀρχὴν διαδέχεται. τοῦτον κατέχει λόγος Χριστιανὸν ὄντα ἐν ἡμέρᾳ τῆς ὑστάτης τοῦ πάσχα παννυχίδος τῶν ἐπὶ τῆς ἐκκλησίας εὐχῶν τῷ πλήθει μετασχεῖν ἐθελῆσαι, οὐ πρότερον δὲ ὑπὸ τοῦ τηνικάδε προεστῶτος ἐπιτραπῆναι εἰσβαλεῖν, ἢ ἐξομολογήσασθαι καὶ τοῖς ἐν παραπτώμασιν ἐξεταζομένοις μετανοίας τε χώραν ἴσχουσιν ἑαυτὸν καταλέξαι· ἄλλως γὰρ μὴ ἄν ποτε πρὸς αὐτοῦ, μὴ οὐχὶ τοῦτο ποιήσαντα, διὰ πολλὰς τῶν κατ' αὐτὸν αἰτίας παραδεχθῆναι. καὶ πειθαρχῆσαι γε προθύμως λέγεται, τὸ γνήσιον καὶ εὐλαβὲς τῆς περὶ τὸν θεῖον φόβον διαθέσεως ἔργοις ἐπιδεδειγμένον.

Gordianus had been Roman emperor for six years when Philip, with his son Philip, succeeded him. It is reported that he, being a Christian, desired, on the day of the last paschal vigil, to share with the multitude in the prayers of the Church, but that he was not permitted to enter, by him who then presided, until he had made confession and had numbered himself among those who were reckoned as transgressors and who occupied the place of penance. For if he had not done this, he would never have been received by him, on account of the many crimes which he had committed. It is said that he obeyed readily, manifesting in his conduct a genuine and pious fear of God.

Eusebius, Historia Ecclesiastica 6.34, tr. A. C. McGiffert

In Shahîd's reconstruction, the event took place at Antioch on 13 April 244 while the emperor was on his way back to Rome from the Persian front. The 12th-century Byzantine historian Zonaras repeats the story.

Eusebius introduces his account of Philip's visit with the words κατέχει λόγος' (katechei logos). The precise meaning of those words in modern European languages has been contested. Ernst Stein, in an account challenging the veracity of Eusebius's narrative, translated the phrase as gerüchte ("rumor"); the scholar John Gregg translated it as "the saying goes." Other renderings are possible, however; modern English translations of the Historia Ecclesiastica have "it is recorded" or "it is reported," as in the translation quoted above. The historian Robin Lane Fox, who translates logos as "story" or "rumor" in scare quotes, emphasizes that Eusebius draws a distinction between his "story" about Philip and the other material in the passage.

The substantiative issue involved is the nature of Eusebius's source; gerüchte suggests hearsay (Frend explains that Eusebius's κατέχει λόγος' "usually means mere suggestion"), but "it is recorded" suggests documentation. Since Eusebius's major sources for 3rd-century history were written records, Shahîd contends that the typical translation misrepresents the original text. His source here is probably one of the two letters from Origen to Philip and Marcia Otacilia Severa, Philip's wife, mentioned at 6.36.3. Shahîd argues that an oral source is unlikely since Eusebius composed his Historia in Caesarea, not Antioch, but others, like Stein and the theologian Arthur Cushman McGiffert, the editor and translator of the Historia for the Select Library of Nicene and Post-Nicene Fathers, contend that the story has an oral source.

Shahîd's position is reinforced by C. H. Roberts and A. N. Sherwin-White, who reviewed his Rome and the Arabs before publication. They consider that the proper interpretation of κατέχει λόγος is a reference to a written account. Roberts notes that Χριστιανὸν ὄντα (Christianon onta, "being a Christian") was probably an editorial insertion by Eusebius that was not included in the logos that he relates in the passage. Shahîd takes that as an indication that Eusebius indeed vouched for Philip's Christianity. Roberts suggested that κατέχει λόγος might be translated as "there is a wide-spread report," but he added that a broader study of Eusebius's use of the expression elsewhere would be useful. Sherwin-White points out Eusebius's use of the phrase in his passage on the Thundering Legion (at Historia Ecclesiastica 5.5) in which it represents a reference to written sources.

However, because Eusebius nowhere categorically asserts that he has read the letters (he states only that he has compiled them) and moderns are disinclined to take him at his word, some, like Pohlsander, posit that Eusebius did not get the tale from the letters and drew it instead from oral rumors. Whatever the case, the wording of the passage shows that Eusebius is unenthusiastic about his subject and skeptical of its significance. Jerome and the later Latin Christian authors did not share his caution.

===== Contexts and parallels =====
For many scholars, the scene at 6.34 seems to anticipate and parallel the confrontation between Theodosius and Ambrose in 390; Erasmus used the two situations as parallel exempla in a letter written to French King Francis I in 1523. The later event has been taken as evidence against Philip's Christianity. Even in the later 4th century, in a society that had already been significantly Christianized, the argument goes, Theodosius's humiliation had shocked the sensibilities of the aristocratic elite. It is, therefore, inconceivable that 3rd century aristocrats, members of a society that had experienced only partial Christianization, would accept such self-abasement from their emperors. Shahîd contests that parallel and argues that Philip's scene was far less humiliating than Theodosius's since it did not take place against the same background (Theodosius had massacred 7,000 Thessalonicans some months before), no one was excommunicated (Theodosius was excommunicated for eight months), and it did not involve the same dramatic and humiliating dialogue between emperor and bishop. Philip made a quick repentance at a small church on his way back to Rome from the Persian front, a stark contrast to the grandeur of Theodosius's confrontation with Ambrose. (Note: Timothy Barnes, a historian of the 3rd and 4th centuries, finds Eusebius's story "suspiciously similar" to a story that the 5th-century church historian Philostorgius (a Eunomian sectary, whose anti-Trinitarian history survives only in Photius's epitome) gives about Babylas and another 3rd-century emperor, Numerian (r. 283–84). Babylas was bishop of Antioch; by inspiration of the devil, Numerian the Roman emperor, or as others say, Decius, was led to desire to enter the church of the Christians at the time when a very large concourse of people had assembled together. But the priest of God stood at the entrance porch and forbade his entry, declaring that, so far as in him lay, he would not suffer a wolf to climb into the fold. But the emperor immediately desisted from his effort, either because he feared a popular outbreak, or because he changed his mind on some other account. But as to the bishop, he first accused him of insolence, and afterwards commanded him to sacrifice to the heathen deities, as being the only sacrifice by which he could at once wash out his offence, and gain honour and glory from posterity. Babylas having resisted the proposals of the emperor with a stout and noble heart, received the crown of martyrdom. Philostorgius, Historia Ecclesiastica 7.8, tr. E. Walford Shahîd draws a different comparison by calling Babylas "the first after the prophet Nathan of Old Testament times to throw a challenge to a Christian ruler [sic]". After noting that Babylas (Philip serves as a prelude to Ambrose) Theodosius, he adduces two more encounters, which embody the same general theme ("the repentance of the emperor"): the Patriarch Nicholas Mystikos's confrontation with Emperor Leo VI at Constantinople in 906/7, and Pope Gregory VII's confrontation with Emperor Henry IV at Canossa in 1077. Shahîd thus believes that Babylas' stand was all the more "courageous" by happening during an era of persecution and instability. He also notes that if the historicity of Babylas' confrontation is accepted (and Mysticus's confrontation with Leo, brought to prominence by Nicolas Oikonomides, is recognized as significant), the four scenes are equally divided between East and West.)

Other scholars, such as ecclesiastical historian H. M. Gwatkin, explain Philip's alleged visit to the church as evidence of simple "curiosity." That he was excluded from services is not surprising: as a "heathen" in official conduct and an unbaptized man, it would have been unusual if he had been admitted. Shahîd rejects idle curiosity as an explanation and argues that 3rd-century churches were too nondescript to attract much undue attention. That Philip was unbaptized is nowhere proven or stated, and, even if true, it would do little to explain the scene. Constantine participated in Christian services despite his postponing baptism to the end of his life, and participation in services without baptism was not unusual for Christians of either period.

==== Dionysius, bishop of Alexandria ====
The mention of those princes who were publicly supposed to be Christians, as we find it in an epistle of Dionysius of Alexandria (ap. Euseb. l. vii c. 10.), evidently alludes to Philip and his family; and forms a contemporary evidence, that such a report had prevailed; but the Egyptian bishop, who lived at an humble distance from the court of Rome, expresses himself with becoming diffidence concerning the truth of the fact.

Edward Gibbon, The History of the Decline and Fall of the Roman Empire, ed. D. Womersley (London: Penguin, 1994 [1776]), 1.554 n. 119.

At 6.41, Eusebius quotes a letter from Dionysius, bishop of Alexandria, to Fabius, bishop of Antioch, on the persecution at Alexandria under Decius. Dionysius begins (at 6.41.1) by describing the pogroms that began a year before Decius's decree of 250; that is, in 249, under Philip. At 6.41.9, Dionysius narrates the transition from Philip to Decius:

καὶ ταῦτα ἐπὶ πολὺ μὲν τοῦτον ἤκμασεν τὸν τρόπον, διαδεξαμένη δὲ τοὺς ἀθλίους ἡ στάσις καὶ πόλεμος ἐμφύλιος τὴν καθ' ἡμῶν ὠμότητα πρὸς ἀλλήλους αὐτῶν ἔτρεψεν, καὶ σμικρὸν μὲν προσανεπνεύσαμεν, ἀσχολίαν τοῦ πρὸς ἡμᾶς θυμοῦ λαβόντων, εὐθέως δὲ ἡ τῆς βασιλείας ἐκείνης τῆς εὐμενεστέρας ἡμῖν μεταβολὴ διήγγελται, καὶ πολὺς ὁ τῆς ἐφ' ἡμᾶς ἀπειλῆς φόβος ἀνετείνετο.

And matters continued thus for a considerable time. But a sedition and civil war came upon the wretched people and turned their cruelty toward us against one another. So we breathed for a little while as they ceased from their rage against us. But presently the change from that milder reign was announced to us, and great fear of what was threatened seized us.

Eusebius, Historia Ecclesiastica 6.41.9, tr. A. C. McGiffert

At 7.10.3, Eusebius quotes a letter from Dionysius to the otherwise-unknown Hermammon on the early years of the rule of Valerian (r. 253–260). In that period, the emperor implicitly tolerated Christianity; Eusebius would contrast his early reputation with his later policy of persecution:

ἀμφότερα δὲ ἔστιν ἐπὶ Οὐαλεριανοῦ θαυμάσαι καὶ τούτων μάλιστα τὰ πρὸ αὐτοῦ ὡς οὕτως ἔσχεν, συννοεῖν ὡς μὲν ἤπιος καὶ φιλόφρων ἦν πρὸς τοὺς ἀνθρώπους τοῦ θεοῦ· οὐδὲ γὰρ ἄλλος τις οὕτω τῶν πρὸ αὐτοῦ βασιλέων εὐμενῶς καὶ δεξιῶς πρὸς αὐτοὺς διετέθη, οὐδ' οἱ λεχθέντες ἀναφανδὸν Χριστιανοὶ γεγονέναι, ὡς ἐκεῖνος οἰκειότατα ἐν ἀρχῇ καὶ προσφιλέστατα φανερὸς ἦν αὐτοὺς ἀποδεχόμενος, καὶ πᾶς τε ὁ οἶκος αὐτοῦ θεοσεβῶν πεπλήρωτο καὶ ἦν ἐκκλησία θεοῦ·

It is wonderful that both of these things occurred under Valerian; and it is the more remarkable in this case when we consider his previous conduct, for he had been mild and friendly toward the men of God, for none of the emperors before him had treated them so kindly and favorably; and not even those who were said openly to be Christians received them with such manifest hospitality and friendliness as he did at the beginning of his reign. For his entire house was filled with pious persons and was a church of God.

Eusebius, Historia Ecclesiastica 7.10.3, tr. A. C. McGiffert

Dionysius is quoted saying that Valerian was so friendly to Christians that he outdid "those who were said to be openly Christians" (οἰ λεχθέντες ἀναφανδὸν Χριοτιανοὶ γεγονέναι, tr. Shahîd). Most scholars, including Shahîd and Stein, understand that as a reference to Severus Alexander and Philip. Because the reference is to a plurality of emperors, which implies that Severus Alexander and Philip were both Christians, Stein dismissed the passage as entirely without evidentiary value. Shahîd, however, contends that genuine information can be extracted from the spurious whole and that while the reference to Severus Alexander is hyperbole, the reference to Philip is not. He explains the reference to Severus Alexander as a Christian as an exaggeration of what was actually only an interest in the Christian religion. Shahîd references a passage in the often-dubious Historia Augusta's biography of the emperors, which states that Alexander had statues of Abraham, Christ, and Orpheus in his private chapel and that he prayed to them each morning. He also adduces the letters sent from Origen to Alexander's mother, Mamaea (Eusebius, Historia Ecclesiastica 6.21, 6.28), to explain Dionysius's comment.

==== Origen's letters ====
φέρεται δὲ αὐτοῦ καὶ πρὸς αὐτὸν βασιλέα Φίλιππον ἐπιστολὴ καὶ ἄλλη πρὸς τὴν τούτου γαμετὴν Σευήραν διάφοροί τε ἄλλαι πρὸς διαφόρους· ὧν ὁπόσας σποράδην παρὰ διαφόροις σωθείσας συναγαγεῖν δεδυνήμεθα, ἐν ἰδίαις τόμων περιγραφαῖς, ὡς ἂν μηκέτι διαρρίπτοιντο, κατελέξαμεν, τὸν ἑκατὸν ἀριθμὸν ὑπερβαινούσας.

There is extant also an epistle of his to the Emperor Philip, and another to Severa his wife, with several others to different persons. We have arranged in distinct books to the number of one hundred, so that they might be no longer scattered, as many of these as we have been able to collect, which have been preserved here and there by different persons.

Eusebius, Historia Ecclesiastica, 6.36.3, tr. A. C. McGiffert

The mention of those princes who were publicly supposed to be Christians...evidently alludes to Philip and his family... The epistles of Origen (which were extant in the time of Eusebius, see l. vi c. 36.) would most probably decide this curious, rather than important, question.
Edward Gibbon, The History of the Decline and Fall of the Roman Empire, ed. D. Womersley (London: Penguin, 1994 [1776]), 1.554 n. 119.

Origen's letters do not survive. However, most scholars believe that the letters that circulated in the era of Eusebius and Jerome were genuine. It is also reasonable that Origen, a man with close contacts in the Christian Arab community, would have taken a particular interest in the first Arab emperor.

The scholar K. J. Neumann argued that since Origen would have known the faith of the imperial couple, he must have written about it in the letters listed at 6.36.3. Since Eusebius read those letters and does not mention that the emperor was Christian (Neumann understands the passage at 6.34 to reflect Eusebius's disbelief in Philip's Christianity), it must concluded that Philip was not Christian and was neither baptized nor made catechumen. Against Neumann, Shahîd argues that if Eusebius had found anything in the letters to disprove Philip's Christianity, he would have clearly outlined it in this passage; as the biographer of Constantine, it would have been in his interest to undermine any other claimants to the title "first Christian emperor." Moreover, this segment of the Historia is a catalog of Origen's works and correspondence; the contents of the letters are irrelevant.

==== Views on the Arabs ====
Eusebius's understanding of the Arab peoples is informed by his reading of the Bible and his knowledge of the history of imperial Rome. He does not appear to have personally known any Arabs. In his Chronicon, all the Arabs that appear save for one reference to Ishmael figure in the political history of the first three centuries of the Christian era. To Eusebius, the Saracens of the 4th century are direct-line descendants of the biblical Ishmaelites, who were descendants of the handmaid, Hagar, and the patriarch, Abraham. They are thus outcasts and beyond God's Covenant with the favored son of Abraham, Isaac. The twin images of the Ishmaelite and the Saracen (outcasts and latrones, raiders of the frontiers) reinforce each other and give Eusebius's portrait of the Arab nation an unhappy color. He may have been reluctant to associate the first Christian emperor with a people of such unfortunate ancestry.

In his Historia, Eusebius does not identify either Philip or Abgar V of Edessa, whom he incorrectly presumes to be the first Christian prince. He does not mention Abgar VIII, who was actually the first Christian prince, as Arabs. He, however, identifies Herod the Great as an Arab and thus tars the Arab nation with the Massacre of the Innocents and the attempted murder of Christ himself. The Christianity of Provincia Arabia in the 3rd century also earns some brief notices: the heresy of Beryllos, bishop of Bostra, and his correction by Origen (6.33); the heretical opinions concerning the soul held by a group of Arabs until corrected by Origen (6.37); and the heresy of Helkesaites (6.38). Eusebius's account of Philip appears amid those Arab heresies (at 6.34, 6.36, and 6.39) although, again, in spite of the fact that Philip so often took on the epithet "the Arab", in antiquity as today, he never identifies him as an Arab. The image of the Arabs as heretics would persist in later ecclesiastical historians (like Epiphanius of Salamis). Shahîd, relating those facts, nonetheless concludes, "Eusebius cannot be accused in the account he gave of the Arabs and their place in the history of Christianity." The fact that Eusebius downplays the role of Philip and Abgar in the establishment of Christianity as a state religion is understandable because of his desire to prop up Constantine's reputation.

==== Views on Constantine ====
In Shahîd's judgment, the imprecision and unemphatic tone of Eusebius's passage at 6.34 is the major cause of the lack of scholarly consensus on Philip's Christianity. To Shahîd, Eusebius's wording choice is a reflection of his own lack of enthusiasm for Philip's Christianity, which is in turn a reflection of the special position Constantine held in his regards and in his written work. A number of scholars, following E. Schwartz, believe the later editions of Eusebius's Historia to have been extensively revised to adapt to the deterioration of Licinius in the public memory (and the official damnatio memoriae) after Constantine deposed and executed him in 324–25. Passages of the Historia that were incompatible with Licinius's denigration were suppressed, and an account of the last years of his life was replaced with a summary of the Council of Nicaea. Shahîd suggests that in addition to those anti-Licinian deletions, Eusebius also edited out favorable notices on Philip to better glorify Constantine's achievement.

In 335, Eusebius wrote and delivered his Laudes Constantini, a panegyric on the thirtieth anniversary of the emperor's reign. His Vita Constantini, written over the next two years, has the same laudatory tone. The ecclesiastical historian, who framed his chronology on the reigns of emperors and related the entries in his history to each emperor's reign, understood Constantine's accession as something miraculous, especially as it came immediately after the Great Persecution. The final edition of his Historia has its climax in Constantine's reign, the ultimate "triumph of Christianity." Shahîd argues that it was, therefore, in his authorial interest to obscure the details of Philip, the first Christian emperor and that because of Eusebius's skill in narrative and deception, modern historians give Constantine that title.

Shahîd further argues that the facts of Philip's alleged Christianity would also discourage Eusebius from celebrating that emperor. Firstly, Philip lacks an exciting conversion narrative; secondly, his religion was private unlike Constantine's very public patronage of the faith; and, thirdly, his reign lasted only five years, not long enough to enact much amelioration of the Christians' condition. In Shahîd's view, the insignificance of his reign to the progress of Christianity, Eusebius's subject, and his role as Constantine's panegyrist explain the tone and content of his account.

==== Vita Constantini ====
F. H. Daniel, in Philip's entry in the Smith–Wace Dictionary of Christian Biography, cites a passage of Eusebius's Vita Constantini as his first piece of evidence against Philip's alleged Christianity. In the passage, Eusebius names Constantine as (in the words of the dictionary) "the first Christian emperor."

ἀθανάτους πιστούμενος ἐλπίδας. παλαιοὶ ταῦτα χρησμοὶ προφητῶν γραφῇ παραδοθέντες θεσπίζουσι, ταῦτα βίοι θεοφιλῶν ἀνδρῶν παντοίαις ἀρεταῖς πρόπαλαι διαλαμψάντων τοῖς ὀψιγόνοις μνημονευόμενοι μαρτύρονται, ταῦτα καὶ ὁ καθ' ἡμᾶς ἀληθῆ εἶναι διήλεγξε χρόνος, καθ' ὃν Κωνσταντῖνος θεῷ τῷ παμβασιλεῖ μόνος τῶν πώποτε τῆς Ῥωμαίων ἀρχῆς καθηγησαμένων γεγονὼς φίλος, ἐναργὲς ἅπασιν ἀνθρώποις παράδειγμα θεοσεβοῦς κατέστη βίου.

The ancient oracles of the prophets, delivered to us in the Scripture, declare this; the lives of pious men, who shone in old time with every virtue, bear witness to posterity of the same; and our own days prove it to be true, wherein Constantine, who alone of all that ever wielded the Roman power was the friend of God the Sovereign of all, has appeared to all mankind so clear an example of a godly life.

Eusebius, Vita Constantini 1.3.4, tr. E.C. Richardson

Shahîd describes that passage as a mere flourish from Eusebius the panegyrist, "carried away by enthusiasm and whose statements must be construed as rhetorical exaggeration." Shahîd does not take it as serious evidence against Eusebius's earlier accounts in the Historia in which he never refers to Constantine as the first Christian emperor. For Shahîd, the passage also represents the last stage in Eusebius's evolving portrait of the pair of emperors: Philip and Constantine. In the early 300s, in his Chronicon, he had nearly called Philip the first Christian emperor; in the 320s, during the revision of the Historia and the Chronicon, he turned wary and skeptical; in the late 330s, he could confidently assert that Constantine was the sole Christian emperor.

John York argues that in writing that passage, Eusebius was cowed by the anti-Licinian propaganda of the Constantinian era. As an ancestor of the emperor's last enemy, Philip could not receive the special distinction of the title "first Christian emperor" that Constantine had claimed it for himself. Perhaps, Shahîd observes, it is not coincidental that Eusebius would paint the Arabs in uncomplimentary terms (as idolaters and practitioners of human sacrifice) in his Laudes Constantini of 335.

=== Chrysostom and Leontius ===
John Chrysostom, deacon at Antioch from 381, was made priest in 386. As a special distinction, his bishop, Flavian, decided that he should preach in the city's principal church. Chrysostom's contribution to the literature on Philip and Christianity is a homily on Babylas, a martyr-bishop who died in 253, during the Decian persecution. The treatise was composed about 382, when John was a deacon, and forms part of Chrysostom's corpus of panegyrics. (Note: Other sermons in this category discussed and glorified Old Testament Saints like Job, Eleazar, and the Maccabees; martyrs like Romanus, Julian, and Barlaam; and the bishops of Antioch like Ignatius, Philogonius, and Meletius.) Chrysostom's Babylas confronts an emperor; and, since Chrysostom is more interested in the bishop than his opponent, the emperor goes unnamed but has since been identified with Philip.

...Being confident, therefore, about what is lent, that both the principal and the profit await you, let us not pass by the gain which falls in our way today, but revel in the noble actions of the blessed Babylas.
How, indeed, he presided over the Church which is among us, and saved that sacred ship, in storm, and in wave, and billow; and what a bold front he showed to the emperor, and how he lay down his life for the sheep and underwent that blessed slaughter; these things and such as these, we will leave to the elder among our teachers, and to our common father, to speak of. For the more remote matters, the aged can relate to you but as many things as happened lately, and within our lifetime, these, I a young man will relate to you, I mean those after death, those after the burial of the martyr, those which happened while he remained in the suburbs of the city....

Excerpt from John Chrysostom, de S. Babylas 1, tr. T. P. Brandam

Leontius was bishop of Antioch from 348 to 357. He is quoted in the Chronicon Paschale (Paschal Chronicle), a universal chronicle of history based on the paschal cycle, as an authority on the martyrdom of Babylas. The quotation describes Philip seeking penitence from Babylas for the sin of murdering his predecessor.

Both Chrysostom and Leontius lived in Antioch, the site of Philip's alleged humiliation and repentance, and wrote in the mid-4th century, a hundred years after the event took place. Shahîd takes that, along with the fact that Babylas is not named in Eusebius's account, as evidence of an independent local tradition. The tradition would have been perhaps partially oral in nature and far removed from the written accounts in Eusebius's library at Caesarea. Many other historians trace the accounts of Chrysostom and Leontius back to Eusebius, Hans Pohlsander deems them as later accretions to Eusebius that were dependent on his Historia for their legendary core, John Gregg holds that the dependent relationship is most probable, and Stein claims all three Greeks as contributors to the same gerüchte.

== In Latin ecclesiastical writing ==
The Latin tradition consists of three authors writing in the later 4th and early 5th centuries: Jerome, Orosius, and Vincent of Lérins. The tradition is represented in Jerome's Liber de viris inlustribus and Chronicon, Orosius's Historiarum Adversum Paganos, and Vincent of Lérins's Commonitorum Primum. Most scholars hold that all of these accounts ultimately derive from Eusebius of Caesarea's Historia. These authors follow the Greek tradition, and probably takes all of their information from Eusebius, Eusebius's sources, or Jerome. These authors are more forceful in their claims than Eusebius, as demonstrated by their use of primus, or "first", as in "first Christian emperor", when referring to Philip. Jerome is the most important, both since he is the earliest of the three, and because, as the editor and translator of Eusebius's Chronicon (Chronicle), he is closest to Eusebius.

=== Jerome ===
Eusebius's first version of the Chronicon was written in 303, and his second in the mid-320s; Jerome's revision, translation and continuation dates to 380. The original Greek is lost; it is largely through Jerome's Latin and through an Armenian translation unrelated to Jerome that the substance of the original survives. Eusebius's original did cover Philip's rule—Jerome's continuation of the Chronicon only covers the period from 325 to 378—but the sections regarding Philip's Christianity do not survive in the Armenian translation. In the Armenian, all references to Arabs are omitted. Philip's celebration of the millennium is preserved, while his supposed Christianity is only implied in the entry on Decius's persecution. Jerome's Chronicon is, therefore, the nearest we can get to Eusebius's early statements on Philip's Christianity. That Jerome calls Philip primus in the Chronicon thus admits of two interpretations: either he found it in Eusebius, or he added it independently, based on other sources available to him. Shahîd argues that, while the text would offer a strong case for Philip's Christianity either way, the former interpretation is more plausible. Shahîd believes that primus appeared in Eusebius first version of the Chronicon, but may have been edited out for the second version—by the mid 320s, Eusebius had become Constantine's panegyrist, and was understandably loath to praise his subject's ignoble predecessors.

In his Liber de viris inlustribus, written twelve years later, in 392, Jerome mentions Philip in his chapter on Origen.

Quantae autem gloriae fuerit, hinc apparet, quod Firmilianus, Caesareae episcopus, cum omni Cappadocia eum invitavit, et diu tenuit, et postea sub occasione sanctorum locorum Palaestinam veniens, diu Caesareae in sanctis Scripturis ab eo eruditus est. Sed et illud, quod ad Mammeam, matrem Alexandri imperatoris, religiosam feminam, rogatus venit Antiochiam, et summo honore habitus est: quodque ad Philippum imperatorem, qui primus de regibus Romanis Christianus fuit, et ad matrem ejus litteras fecit, quae usque hodie exstant.

How great the glory of Origen was, appears from the fact that Firmilianus, bishop of Cæsarea, with all the Cappadocian bishops, sought a visit from him, and entertained him for a long while. Sometime afterwards, going to Palestine to visit the holy places, he came to Cæsarea and was instructed at length by Origen in the Holy Scriptures. It appears also from the fact that he went to Antioch, on the request of Mammaea, mother of the Emperor Alexander, and a woman religiously disposed, and was there held in great honour, and sent letters to the Emperor Philip, who was the first among the Roman rulers, to become a Christian, and to his mother, letters which are still extant.

Jerome, Liber de viris inlustribus 54, tr. E. C. Richardson

The passage contains two important features: first, the statement that the letters of Origen to Philip and his family were still extant in Jerome's time; and second, a strong affirmation of Philip's Christianity. The sentence also contains the false reference to Philip's mother (matrem) as the recipient of a letter from Origen — it was actually Philip's wife who received it. Jerome probably confused her with Alexander Severus's mother Mammaea. Bowersock characterizes the whole passage as a "confused copy" of Eusebius's evidence. Shahîd understands "quae usque hodie extant" to mean that Jerome had read the letters; that he refers to Philip as primus would thus mean that he either found positive evidence for Philip's Christianity in them or, at least, that he found nothing to disprove it.

Jerome otherwise had a dim view of the Arabs. His prejudices were those of a native Roman. Born in Strido (in modern Croatia or Slovenia), near Aquileia, and educated in Rome, Jerome was a lover of Latin, Italy, and the city of Rome. In about 374, he found himself accused in a dream while in Antioch on the way to Palestine: "Ciceronianus es, non Christianus", "you are a Ciceronian, not a Christian". In one of his letters, written while he was staying in the desert of Chalcis, he tells of the joy he had when he discovered that his correspondents had written a letter to him in Latin. All he had to hear during the day were the "barbarous" languages of the natives (that is, Syriac and Arabic). From this evidence, Shahîd concludes that Jerome would not honor the memory of an Arab emperor without a strong rationale.

=== Orosius and the Origo Constantini Imperatoris ===
To Orosius, Constantine was the first Christian Roman emperor, except for Philip (he was the "primus imperatorum Christianus, excepto Philippo"). He probably took this judgment from Jerome—he had met the author in Bethlehem in 415, while on assignment from Augustine of Hippo. Although his judgment is thus not independent of Jerome, Shahîd contends that it is nonetheless valuable since Orosius did not have a bias towards either emperor. It presents Philip in the role Christian history merited: as precursor to Constantine. Because Orosius's Historiae adversum paganos served as the standard manual of universal history during the middle ages, his judgment on this matter was inherited, and generally accepted, by medieval European writers.

Orosius's wording is echoed by the Origo Constantini Imperatoris, an anonymous work usually dated to the late 4th century. "Constantine was also the first Christian emperor, with the exception of Philippus, who seemed to me to have become a Christian merely in order that the one-thousandth year of Rome might be dedicated to Christ rather than to pagan idols." ("Item Constantinus imperator primus Christianus, excepto Philippo, qui Christianus admodum ad hoc tantum constitutus fuisse mihi visus est, ut millesimus Romae annus Christo potius quam idolis dicaretur", tr. J.C. Rolfe) The scholar Samuel N. C. Lieu holds that this passage is a later interpolation, designed to give the work's pagan core a Christian gloss. According to Lieu, this passage, along with others, was probably taken from Orosius's history and inserted into the Origo Constantini during the reign of Constantine III (r. 417–21), a period that witnessed substantial anti-pagan polemic. Shahîd argues that, since the author of the Origo Constantini was a biographer of Constantine, and not a historian of the 3rd and 4th centuries, his reference to Philip is unnecessary. The conflicting claims of Philip and Constantine to primacy may have been at issue at the turn of the 5th century, when the Origo Constantini and Historia adversum paganos were written.

=== Vincent of Lérins ===
In the chapter on Origen in his Commonitorium primum, Vincent of Lérins writes "quos ad Philippum imperatorem, qui primus romanorum principum Christianus fuit, Christiani magisterii acutoritate conscripsit." ("with the authority which [Origen] assumed as a Christian Teacher, he wrote to the Emperor Philip, the first Roman prince that was a Christian.") Vincent thus unites the commentary on Origen's letters with Philip's Christianity, as Jerome had done. It is possible that he was only following Jerome in so doing, but Shahîd argues that his note that the letters were written "Christiani magisterii auctoritate" implies that he has read the letters. Additionally, the variance between his wording and Jerome's (Vincent refers to Philip as a princeps, not a rex, and he calls the letters epistolae, not litterae) speaks for Vincent's independence of Jerome.

== In Zosimus and other secular writing ==
But [Philip's] conduct as emperor and the universal silence of pagan sources in the matter of any Christian leanings make it highly unlikely that Philip had actually become a Christian. The silence of Zosimus is particularly impressive, inasmuch as he vigorously disliked both Arabs and Christians. His account is most unflattering in ethnic terms; and if there had been anything to say about his being a Christian, Zosimus would surely have said it.
Glen Bowersock, Roman Arabia (Cambridge, MA: Harvard University Press, 1980, 3rd rev. ed. 1994), 126.

Zosimus, a pagan writing at the turn of the 6th century, wrote a work titled the Historia Nova (New History). Its detailed sections cover the period from the 3rd century AD to 410. Zosimus, like all secular historians in his era, addressed himself to the governing class of the later Roman empire: officers, bureaucrats, and the landed aristocracy. There was relatively little overlap between the reading audience of secular histories and the ecclesiastical histories of Eusebius and his successors. Zosimus's history was written as a polemic, with the aim of establishing that barbarism and Christianity were the essential causes of the decline of the Roman state. Because of these themes, the Historia Nova is considered the first history of what moderns would call Rome's "decline and fall". Although skilled in literary rhetoric, Zosimus was a poor historian. He confuses dates and persons, is ignorant of geography, and treats his sources with naive simplicity. For the 3rd century, Zosimus follows Eunapius of Sardis and Olympiodorus of Thebes. Since Eunapius's history began in 272, where the Chronicle of another historian, Dexippus, ended, Zosimus probably used Dexippus's Chronicle, and perhaps his histories of the German wars between 250 and 270. Dexippus, however, was as poor a historian as Zosimus. The surviving fragments of his work show an uncritical author, without strong sources, who prefers rhetoric to fact. (The secular sources for this period are all quite weak.) Zosimus says nothing of Philip's alleged Christianity.

Zosimus had no great respect for Philip, and offers an unfavorable judgment on his reign. Nonetheless, he offers a curiously detailed narrative of his reign. He devotes five sections of his Historia Nova to the emperor (1.18–22) — more than Alexander Severus, who only gets half a section (1.8). He even reverts to Philip in the midst of a discussion of the Peace of Jovian (363) two books later (at 3.32), taking the opportunity to recall Philip's own "disgraceful" peace with the Persians. In Shahîd's judgment, Zosimus makes this editorial decision to emphasize his central theme — the decline and "barbarization" of Rome. Zosimus's views on the latter phenomenon reflect his racial prejudice. In Zosimus's view, Philip was a barbarian operating at the highest levels of power. The unsavory character of Philip is contrasted with his ethnically Roman predecessor, Gordian (whom Philip helped overthrow), and his Roman successor, Decius, who wins glowing praise from the historian.

As he disliked both Arabs and Christians, some scholars, such as Bowersock, have taken Zosimus's silence on the matter as strong evidence against Philip's alleged Christianity. Others, like historian Warwick Ball, view Zosimus's evident distaste for Philip as noteworthy, and suggest that the historian's anti-Christian polemic is indirect in his writing on the emperor. Shahîd construes Zosimus's silence as an argument for Philip's Christianity. Zosimus, he argues, would never have shown such distaste for a pagan. Septimius Severus was a "barbarian", an African born at Leptis Magna whose mother tongue was Phoenician and whose wife, Julia Domna, was a provincial from Emesa. But Severus gets a good press from Zosimus (1.8). Nor would Philip's assistance in the execution of Gordian be enough: the 3rd century was hardly a stranger to such bloodshed and treachery. Zosimus's hostility begins to makes sense, Shahîd contends, once we assume that he was aware of the tradition that viewed Philip as a Christian (and perhaps even accepted it). And it becomes perfectly clear once we understand the importance Zosimus attributes to the Secular Games, and the schematic incongruity he would behold when a Christian emperor was presiding over them.

In 248, Philip held Secular Games (Ludi Saeculares) to celebrate the thousandth anniversary of Rome's legendary founding by Romulus. It is presumed that he would have officiated over the games in his capacity as pontifex maximus, chief priest of the state cults. Allard accepts that he made no public notice of his private religion, and that he ran the games as a "prince païen", a "pagan prince". Pohlsander cites a number of early Christian theologians in support of his contention that "Christians generally condemned 'games' of any kind." Tertullian's de Spectaculis, Novatian's treatise of the same name (which does not survive), and Cyprian's disapproving comments in his ad Donatum are offered as examples. The later followers of Jerome, however, like Orosius and Bede, mention Philip's games approvingly—Orosius even claims that Philip did not sacrifice during the games. Pohlsander concedes that public games continued under Christian emperors throughout the 4th century (they were eventually outlawed in 404 under Honorius). Ball argues that even Constantine was deified, and that Philip had no choice but to publicly oversee the games, seeing as how the debacle of Elagabalus was still fresh in memory. Elagabalus had tried to force an Eastern religion onto Romans to disastrous consequences, which would motivate Philip, already in an unstable position, to keep his personal faith a private matter.

Zosimus provides the lengthiest account of the games (at Historia Nova 2.1–7), but does not mention Philip. The games had a starring role in Zosimus's scheme of Roman history. To him, the fortune of the empire was intimately related to the practice of the traditional civic rites. Any emperor who revived or supported those rites—Augustus, Claudius, Domitian, Septimius Severus—earns Zosimus's credit, while the emperor who ended them, Constantine I, earns his condemnation. All the misfortune of the 4th century can be directly attributed to Constantine's discontinuation of the old rites. In this context, Shahîd argues, Zosimus's silence on Philip's Christianity and Philip's involvement in the games makes sense. First, it would have given lie to his thesis on that the practice of the traditional rites guaranteed the fortunes of empire, since the period following the games was hardly a happy one (and this argument remains valid even if both Philip's Christianity and Zosimus's awareness of the tradition is denied). And second, it would have dulled his attack on Constantine by disentangling the potent alignment between imperial disaster, Christianity, and the traditional cult. The last emperor to celebrate the games was also the first emperor to embrace Christianity. The incongruity of this fact proved too much for the historian to handle, so he ignored it.

== Historiography ==
Because of the continuing popularity of Jerome's Chronicon and Orosius's Historia, the medieval writers who wrote about Philip called him the first Christian emperor. The Chronica Gallica of 452, Prosper of Aquitaine (d. ca. 455), Cassiodorus (d. ca. 585), Jordanes (fl. 551), Isidore of Seville (d. 636), and Bede (d. 735) all follow Jerome on this point. One early medieval historian writing at the eve of the millennium, the Lombard Landolfus Sagax, held that Philip had confessed to Fabian, Bishop of Rome, instead of Babylas.

By the late 17th century, when Tillemont wrote his Histoire des Empereurs, it was no longer possible to make the argument that Philip was a Christian "ſans difficulté", "without difficulty". And when Jean-Baptiste Louis Crévier wrote his L'Histoire des empereurs des Romains, jusqu'à Constantin in 1749, he affirmed the contrary, that Philip was not a Christian at all: "...it is easy to judge what degree of credit ought to be given to this story of his penance; which, besides, is not fully and exactly related by any ancient author. To make out an account of it any way tolerable, they have been obliged to patch several evidences together, and to supply and alter the one by the other. The shortest and safest course is not to admit of a perplexed and ill supported narrative. We have no great temptation to torture history in order to claim such a Christian."

Edward Gibbon, in the first volume of his History of the Decline and Fall of the Roman Empire (1776), would take the same position: "The public and even partial favour of Philip towards the sectaries of the new religion, and his constant reverence for the ministers of the church, gave some colour to the suspicion, which prevailed in his own times, that the emperor himself was become a convert to the faith; and afforded some grounds for a fable which was afterwards invented, that he had been purified by confession and penance from the guilt contracted by the murder of his innocent predecessor." And the fable has—"as usual"—"been embellished". To Gibbon, the matter is "curious, rather than important", and the man he credits with disposing of it, Friedrich Spanheim (d. 1649), is said to have shown "much superfluous learning" in the task.

French historians of the 19th and 20th century were more favorable to the notion. Paul Allard, in his Histoire des persecutions pendant la premiere moitié du troisième siecle (1881); René Aigrain, in his chapter "Arabie" in the Dictionnaire d'Histoire et de Géographie Ecclésiastique (1909); Henri Grégoire, in Les persécutions dans l'empire romain (1964); and Jean Daniélou and Henri-Irénée Marrou, in The Christian Centuries 1: The First Six Hundred Years (English tr., 1964), all strongly supported the notion. English and German scholars were less likely to accept it. Ecclesiastical historians of the 19th century, like John Mason Neale, B. J. Kidd, and H. M. Gwatkin, gave the notion some credence, but less than their full support. Critical historians, like Ernst Stein, Karl Johannes Neumann, and John Gregg, denied it entirely.

In the late 20th century, a small number of articles and book chapters discussed the matter. John York's "The Image of Philip the Arab" (1972) argued that the literary material on Philip's reign was deeply biased against the emperor. York attempted to correct the narrative, and rehabilitate Philip's reputation. He held that Eusebius's logos was derived from an oral tradition originating in Antioch, and that Origen's letters cannot have definitively proven Philip's Christianity, since (he follows Jerome's Liber de viris inlustribus 54 here) those letters were addressed to Philip's son. Because of this fact, York declared that Philip's Christianity was only "probable", not certain. H. Crouzel's "Le christianisme de l'empereur Philippe l'Arabe" (1975) argued that the Antiochene tradition, as represented by Chrysostom and Leontius, was independent of Eusebius, and that Eusebius was, likewise, ignorant of it. The sources of Eusebius's logos were instead Origen's letters to Philip and Severa. Crouzel is not entirely certain on that point but considers it only très probable ("very probable"). In spite of Crouzel's arguments, Pierre Nautin's Origène (1977) was very skeptical of accounts of Philip's Christianity, and Hans Pohlsander's "Philip the Arab and Christianity" (1980), adducing Philip's commitment to traditional civic religion as evidence, denied all accounts of Philip's Christianity.

In a lengthy chapter of his 1984 book Rome and the Arabs, Irfan Shahîd argued that Philip deserved the title of "First Christian Emperor". The chapter is divided into five parts: (1) a brief listing of the sources; (2) a lengthy address to Ernst Stein's arguments against accounts of Philip's Christianity; (3) an explanation of Eusebius's caution and dissimulation; (4) an exposition of the Latin authors' accounts of Philip's Christianity; and (5) Eusebius's relationship with the unnamed bishop in his passage, Babylas, and Babylas's importance in ecclesiastical history. He follows the main body of the chapter with an appendix addressing the articles by York, Crouzel, and Pohlsander, "Philip the Arab and Christianity", and noting the judgments of the scholars who reviewed his draft.

Currently, there is no consensus on the issue of Philip's Christianity. Timothy Barnes, who reviewed Shahîd's chapters on "The First Christian Emperor" and "Eusebius and the Arabs" in 1979, would only say that Eusebius "[presents] Philip as a Christian", in his Constantine and Eusebius (1981). Warwick Ball, author of Rome and the East: The transformation of an empire (2000), argued in favor of Philip's Christianity. David Potter, author of The Roman Empire at Bay (2004), treated the matter dismissively: accounts of Philip's Christianity were simply "bogus", Potter wrote, and works that accepted them should be treated with less respect on that count alone. Some scholars, like Glen Bowersock, took a middle route. Bowersock, reviewing Shahîd's Rome and the Arabs for the Classical Review in 1986, wrote: "I doubt many will be convinced by the extreme position that [Shahîd] has taken, but his arguments do offer some basis for believing that Philip was seriously interested in the religion". He reiterated that view in his Roman Arabia (1980, 3rd rev. ed. 1994).

For the French Byzantinologist Gilbert Dagron, Philip's Christianity is a legend—albeit a very old one—that intended, in a Late Roman/Early Byzantine context, to foster the idea of a Roman Empire that was Christian almost from the beginning, thereby melding Roman Imperial ideology and Christianism, and therefore offering a base for other later legends showing Roman emperors, beginning with Augustus, to be aware and/or sympathetic to Christian revelation, forming a legendary corpus that was brought together during the 6th century by the chronicler John Malalas.

== See also ==
- Constantine the Great and Christianity

== Citations ==
All citations to the Historia Augusta are to individual biographies, and are marked with a "HA".

== Bibliography ==
=== Ancient sources ===
- Ammianus Marcellinus. Res Gestae.

- Yonge, Charles Duke, trans. Roman History. London: Bohn, 1862. Online at Tertullian. Accessed 15 August 2009.
- Rolfe, J.C., trans. History. 3 vols. Loeb ed. London: Heinemann, 1939–52. Online at LacusCurtius. Accessed 15 August 2009.
- Hamilton, Walter, trans. The Later Roman Empire (A.D. 354–378). Harmondsworth: Penguin, 1986. [Abridged]

- Aurelius Victor. Liber de Caesaribus.

- Pichlmayr, Franz, ed. Liber de Caesaribvs Aurelii Victoris Historiae Abbreviatae (in Latin). Teubner ed. 1911. Online at the Latin Library. Accessed 10 October 2009.
- Bird, H.W., trans. Liber de Caesaribus of Sextus Aurelius Victor. Liverpool: Liverpool University Press, 1994.

- Chronicon Paschale.

- Dindorf, L.A., ed. Bonn, 1832. Volume 1, 2 online at Google Books. Accessed 6 October 2009.

- Cyprian.

- Epistulae (Letters).

- Migne, J.P., ed. S. Thascii Cæcilii Cypriani episcopi carthaginensis et martyris (in Latin). Patrologia Latina 4. Paris, 1897. Online at Documenta Catholica Omnia. Accessed 7 November 2009.
- Wallis, Robert Ernest, trans. Epistles of Cyprian of Carthage. From Ante-Nicene Fathers, Vol. 5. Edited by Alexander Roberts, James Donaldson, and A. Cleveland Coxe. Buffalo, NY: Christian Literature Publishing Co., 1886. Revised and edited for New Advent by Kevin Knight. Online at New Advent and CCEL. Accessed 1 November 2009.

- Eusebius of Caesarea.

- Historia Ecclesiastica (Church History) first seven books ca. 300, eighth and ninth book ca. 313, tenth book ca. 315, epilogue ca. 325.

- Migne, J.P., ed. Eusebiou tou Pamphilou, episkopou tes en Palaistine Kaisareias ta euriskomena panta (in Greek). Patrologia Graeca 19–24. Paris, 1857. Online at Khazar Skeptik and Documenta Catholica Omnia. Accessed 4 November 2009.
- McGiffert, Arthur Cushman, trans. Church History. From Nicene and Post-Nicene Fathers, Second Series, Vol. 1. Edited by Philip Schaff and Henry Wace. Buffalo, NY: Christian Literature Publishing Co., 1890. Revised and edited for New Advent by Kevin Knight. Online at New Advent and CCEL. Accessed 28 September 2009.
- Williamson, G.A., trans. Church History. London: Penguin, 1989.

- Laudes Constantini (In Praise of Constantine) 335.

- Migne, J.P., ed. Eusebiou tou Pamphilou, episkopou tes en Palaistine Kaisareias ta euriskomena panta (in Greek). Patrologia Graeca 19–24. Paris, 1857. Online at Khazar Skeptik. Accessed 4 November 2009.
- Richardson, Ernest Cushing, trans. Oration in Praise of Constantine. From Nicene and Post-Nicene Fathers, Second Series, Vol. 1. Edited by Philip Schaff and Henry Wace. Buffalo, NY: Christian Literature Publishing Co., 1890. Revised and edited for New Advent by Kevin Knight. Online at New Advent and CCEL. Accessed 19 October 2009.

- Vita Constantini (The Life of the Blessed Emperor Constantine) ca. 336–39.

- Migne, J.P., ed. Eusebiou tou Pamphilou, episkopou tes en Palaistine Kaisareias ta euriskomena panta (in Greek). Patrologia Graeca 19–24. Paris, 1857. Online at Khazar Skeptik. Accessed 4 November 2009.
- Richardson, Ernest Cushing, trans. Life of Constantine. From Nicene and Post-Nicene Fathers, Second Series, Vol. 1. Edited by Philip Schaff and Henry Wace. Buffalo, NY: Christian Literature Publishing Co., 1890. Revised and edited for New Advent by Kevin Knight. Online at New Advent and CCEL. Accessed 9 June 2009.

- Jerome.

- Chronicon (Chronicle) ca. 380.

- Fotheringham, John Knight, ed. The Bodleian Manuscript of Jerome's Version of the Chronicle of Eusebius. Oxford: Clarendon, 1905. Online at the Internet Archive. Accessed 8 October 2009.
- Pearse, Roger, et al., trans. The Chronicle of St. Jerome, in Early Church Fathers: Additional Texts. Tertullian, 2005. Online at Tertullian. Accessed 14 August 2009.

- de Viris Illustribus (On Illustrious Men) 392.

- Herding, W., ed. De Viris Illustribus (in Latin). Leipzig: Teubner, 1879. Online at Google Books. Accessed 6 October 2009.
- Liber de viris inlustribus (in Latin). Texte und Untersuchungen 14. Leipzig, 1896.
- Richardson, Ernest Cushing, trans. De Viris Illustribus (On Illustrious Men). From Nicene and Post-Nicene Fathers, Second Series, Vol. 3. Edited by Philip Schaff and Henry Wace. Buffalo, NY: Christian Literature Publishing Co., 1892. Revised and edited for New Advent by Kevin Knight. Online at New Advent and CCEL. Accessed 15 August 2009.

- Epistulae (Letters).

- Fremantle, W.H., G. Lewis and W.G. Martley, trans. Letters. From Nicene and Post-Nicene Fathers, Second Series, Vol. 6. Edited by Philip Schaff and Henry Wace. Buffalo, NY: Christian Literature Publishing Co., 1893. Revised and edited for New Advent by Kevin Knight. Online at New Advent and CCEL. Accessed 19 October 2009.

- John Chrysostom. de S. Babyla (On St. Babylas) ca. 382.

- Migne, J.P., ed. S.P.N. Joannis Chrysostomi, Operae Omnia Quæ Exstant (in Greek). 2.1. Patrologia Graeca 50. Paris, 1862. Online at Google Books. Accessed 6 October 2009.
- Brandram, T.P., trans. On the Holy Martyr, S. Babylas. From Nicene and Post-Nicene Fathers, Second Series, Vol. 9. Edited by Philip Schaff and Henry Wace. Buffalo, NY: Christian Literature Publishing Co., 1889. Revised and edited for New Advent by Kevin Knight. Online at New Advent and CCEL. Accessed 8 October 2009.

- Jordanes. De summa temporum vel origine actibusque gentis Romanorum. Ca. 551.

- Mommsen, T., ed. Monumenta Germaniae Historica (in Latin). Auctores Antiquissimi 5.1. Berlin, 1882. Online at "Bayerische StaatsBibliothek". and the Latin Library. Accessed 8 October 2009.

- Lactantius. Divinae Institutiones (Divine Institutes).

- Brandt, Samuel and Georg Laubmann, eds. L. Caeli Firmiani Lactanti Opera Omnia vol. 1. Corpus Scriptorum Ecclesiasticorum Latinorum 19. Vienna: F. Tempsky, 1890. Online at the Internet Archive. Accessed 30 January 2010.
- Fletcher, William, trans. The Divine Institutes. From Ante-Nicene Fathers, Vol. 7. Edited by Alexander Roberts, James Donaldson, and A. Cleveland Coxe. Buffalo, NY: Christian Literature Publishing Co., 1886. Revised and edited for New Advent by Kevin Knight. Online at New Advent and CCEL. Accessed 30 January 2010.

- Liber Pontificalis (Book of Popes).

- Loomis, L.R., trans. The Book of Popes. New York: Columbia University Press, 1916. Online at the Internet Archive. Accessed 4 November 2009.

- Monumenta Germaniae Historica (in Latin). Mommsen, T., ed. Auctores Antiquissimi 5, 9, 11, 13. Berlin, 1892, 1894. Online at the "Bayerische StaatsBibliothek".. Accessed 8 October 2009.
- Oracula Sibyllina.

- Alexandre, Charles, ed. Oracula sibyllina (in Greek). Paris: Firmin Didot Fratres, 1869. Online at Google Books. Accessed 8 October 2009.

- Origen. Contra Celsum (Against Celsus) ca. 248.

- Migne, J.P., ed. Origenous ta euriskomena panta (in Greek). Patrologia Graeca 11–17. Paris, 1857–62. Online at Khazar Skeptik. Accessed 4 November 2009.
- Crombie, Frederick, trans. From Ante-Nicene Fathers, Vol. 4. Edited by Alexander Roberts, James Donaldson, and A. Cleveland Coxe. (Buffalo, NY: Christian Literature Publishing Co., 1885.) Revised and edited for New Advent by Kevin Knight. Online at New Advent and CCEL. Accessed 1 November 2009.

- Origo Constantini Imperatoris.

- Rolfe, J.C., trans. Excerpta Valesiana, in vol. 3 of Rolfe's translation of Ammianus Marcellinus' History. Loeb ed. London: Heinemann, 1952. Online at LacusCurtius. Accessed 16 August 2009.
- Stevenson, Jane, trans. The Origin of Constantine. In Samuel N. C. Lieu and Dominic Montserrat, From Constantine to Julian: Pagan and Byzantine Views, 43–48. New York: Routledge, 1996.

- Orosius. Historiarum Adversum Paganos Libri VII (Seven Books of History Against the Pagans) ca. 417.

- Migne, J.P., ed. Fl. Lucii Dextri, Pauli Orosii, Leporii Presbyteri, Evodii, Scriptorum Quorumdam S. Augustino Æqualium. Patrologia Latina 31.663–1174. Paris, 1846. Online at Google Books. Accessed 9 October 2009.
- Zangemeister, K.F.W., ed. Historiarum Adversum Paganos Libri VII. Teubner ed. Leipzig, 1889. Online at the Internet Archive: 1, 2. Revised and edited for Attalus by Max Bänziger. Online at Attalus. Accessed 8 October 2009.
- Unknown trans. A History against the Pagans. Online at Demon Tortoise Archived 2013-03-08 at the Wayback Machine. Accessed 4 November 2009.

- Philostorgius. Historia Ecclesiastica.

- Walford, Edward, trans. Epitome of the Ecclesiastical History of Philostorgius, Compiled by Photius, Patriarch of Constantinople. London: Henry G. Bohn, 1855. Online at Tertullian. Accessed 15 August 2009.

- Scriptores Historiae Augustae (Authors of the Historia Augusta). Historia Augusta (Augustan History).

- Magie, David, trans. Historia Augusta. 3 vols. Loeb ed. London: Heinemann, 1921–32. Online at LacusCurtius. Accessed 26 August 2009.
- Birley, Anthony R., trans. Lives of the Later Caesars. London: Penguin, 1976.

- Tertullian. De Spectaculis.

- Thelwall, S., trans. The Shows. From Ante-Nicene Fathers, Vol. 3. Edited by Alexander Roberts, James Donaldson, and A. Cleveland Coxe. Buffalo, NY: Christian Literature Publishing Co., 1885. Revised and edited for New Advent by Kevin Knight. Online at New Advent and CCEL. Accessed 9 October 2009.

- Vincent of Lérins.

- Migne, J.P., ed. S. Vincentii Lirensis, Commonitorum Primum (Ex editione Baluziana). Patrologia Latina 50. Paris, 1874. Online at Documenta Catholica Omnia. Accessed 6 October 2009.
- Heurtley, C.A., trans. Against The Profane Novelties Of All Heresies. From Nicene and Post-Nicene Fathers, Second Series, Vol. 11. Edited by Philip Schaff and Henry Wace. Buffalo, NY: Christian Literature Publishing Co., 1894. Revised and edited for New Advent by Kevin Knight. Online at New Advent and CCEL. Accessed 6 October 2009.

- Zonaras. Annales (Annals).

- Migne, J.P., ed. Ioannou tou Zonara ta euriskomena panta: historica, canonica, dogmatica (in Greek). Patrologia Graeca 134–35. Paris, 1864–87. Online at Khazar Skeptik. Accessed 4 November 2009.
- Niebhur, B.G., ed. Ioannes Zonaras Annales (in Greek and Latin). Corpus Scriptorum Historiae Byzantinae. Bonn, 1844. Books 1–6, 7–12 online at Documenta Catholica Omnia. Accessed 9 October 2009.

- Zosimus. Historia Nova (New History).

- Unknown, trans. The History of Count Zosimus. London: Green and Champlin, 1814. Online at Tertullian. Accessed 15 August 2009. [An unsatisfactory edition.]

=== Modern sources ===
- Allard, Paul. Histoire des persécutions pendant la première moitié du troisième siècle (in French). 1st ed. Paris: Victor Lecoffre, 1886. Online at Google Books. Accessed 10 October 2009.
- Allard, Paul. Le christianisme et l'empire romain: de Néron a Théodose (in French). 2nd ed. Paris: Victor Lecoffre, 1897. Online at the Internet Archive. Accessed 10 October 2009.
- Ball, Warwick. Rome in the East: The transformation of an empire. London: Routledge, 2000.
- Barnes, Timothy D. "Legislation against the Christians". Journal of Roman Studies 58:1–2 (1968): 32–50.
- Barnes, Timothy D. Constantine and Eusebius. Cambridge, MA: Harvard University Press, 1981.
- Bowersock, Glen W. Review of Irfan Shahîd's Rome and the Arabs and Byzantium and the Arabs in the Fourth Century. The Classical Review 36:1 (1986): 111–17.
- Bowersock, Glen W. Roman Arabia. 3rd ed. Cambridge, MA: Harvard University Press, 1994.
- Cameron, Averil. "Education and literary culture." In The Cambridge Ancient History, Volume XIII: The Late Empire, A.D. 337–425, edited by Averil Cameron and Peter Garnsey, 665–707. New York: Cambridge University Press, 1998.
- Clarke, Graeme. "Third-Century Christianity." In The Cambridge Ancient History, Volume XII: The Crisis of Empire, edited by Alan Bowman, Averil Cameron, and Peter Garnsey, 589–671. New York: Cambridge University Press, 2005.
- Dagron, G. Emperor and Priest: the Imperial Office in Byzantium. Cambridge University Press, 2007, ISBN 0-521-03697-6
- Drake, H. A. Constantine and the Bishops: The Politics of Intolerance. Baltimore: Johns Hopkins University Press, 2000.
- Elliott, T. G. The Christianity of Constantine the Great. Scranton, PA: University of Scranton Press, 1996.
- Frend, W. H. C. Martyrdom and Persecution in the Early Church. Grand Rapids, MI: Baker Book House, 1981 [rept. of Basil Blackwell, 1965 ed.].
- Frend, W. H. C. The Rise of Christianity. Philadelphia, PA: Fortress Press, 1984.
- Frend, W. H. C. "Persecutions: Genesis and Legacy." In The Cambridge History of Christianity, Volume I: Origins to Constantine, edited by Margaret M. Mitchell and Frances M. Young, 503–523. New York: Cambridge University Press, 2006.
- Gibbon, Edward. The History of the Decline and Fall of the Roman Empire. Edited by David Womersley. London: Allen Lane, 1994 [1776–88]. [The 1906 Bury edition is available, without pagination, at The Online Library of Liberty Archived 2009-04-25 at the Wayback Machine. Accessed 23 October 2009.]
- Goffart, Walter. "Zosimus, The First Historian of Rome's Fall". American Historical Review 76:2 (1971): 412–41.
- Gregg, John A. F. The Decian Persecution. Edinburgh and London: W. Blackwood & Sons, 1897. Online at the Internet Archive. Accessed 8 October 2009
- Gwatkin, H. M. Early Church History to A.D. 313. 2 vols. 2nd ed. London: Macmillan, 1912. Vols. 1, 2 online at the Internet Archive. Accessed 9 October 2009.
- Jones, A. H. M. The Cities of the Eastern Roman Provinces. Oxford: Clarendon Press, 1937.
- Kidd, B. J. A History of the Church to A.D. 461. 3 vols. Oxford: Clarendon Press, 1922.
- Lane Fox, Robin. Pagans and Christians. London: Penguin, 1986.
- Lieu, Samuel N. C., and Dominic Montserrat. From Constantine to Julian: Pagan and Byzantine Views. New York: Routledge, 1996.
- Louth, Andrew. "Introduction". In Eusebius: The History of the Church from Christ to Constantine, translated by G. A. Williamson, edited and revised by Andrew Louth, ix–xxxv. London: Penguin, 1989.
- Millar, Fergus. The Roman Near East: 31 BC – AD 337. Cambridge, MA: Harvard University Press, 1993.
- Neale, John Mason. A History of the Holy Eastern Church: The Patriarchate of Antioch. London: Rivingtons, 1873.
- Peachin, Michael. "Philip's Progress: From Mesopotamia to Rome in A.D. 244". Historia 40:3 (1991): 331–42.
- Pohlsander, Hans A. "Philip the Arab and Christianity". Historia 29:4 (1980): 463–73.
- Pohlsander, Hans A. "Did Decius Kill the Philippi?" Historia 31:2 (1982): 214–22.
- Potter, David. The Roman Empire at Bay: AD 180–395. New York: Routledge, 2004.
- Quasten, Johannes. Patrology. 4 vols. Westminster, MD: Newman Press, 1950–1986.
- Rives, J. B. "The Decree of Decius and the Religion of Empire". Journal of Roman Studies 89 (1999): 135–54.
- de Sainte-Croix, G. E. M. "Why Were the Early Christians Persecuted?" Past & Present 26 (1963): 6–38.
- Shahîd, Irfan. Rome and the Arabs: A Prolegomenon to the Study of Byzantium and the Arabs. Washington, D.C.: Dumbarton Oaks, 1984.
- Shahîd, Irfan. Byzantium and the Arabs in the Fourth Century. Washington, D.C.: Dumbarton Oaks, 1984.
- Tillemont, Louis-Sébastien le Nain. Histoire des Empereurs, vol. 3: Qui Comprend Depuis Severe juſques à l'election de Diocletien (in French). New ed. Paris: Charles Robustel, 1720. Online at Google Books. Accessed 22 October 2009.
- Trombley, Frank R. Hellenic Religion and Christianization c. 370–529. 2 vols. Boston: E. J. Brill, 1995.
- York, John M. "The Image of Philip the Arab". Historia 21:2 (1972): 320–32.
