= Hippolytus of Rome =

Christian theologian and saint (c. 170 – c. 235)

Saint Hippolytus of Rome
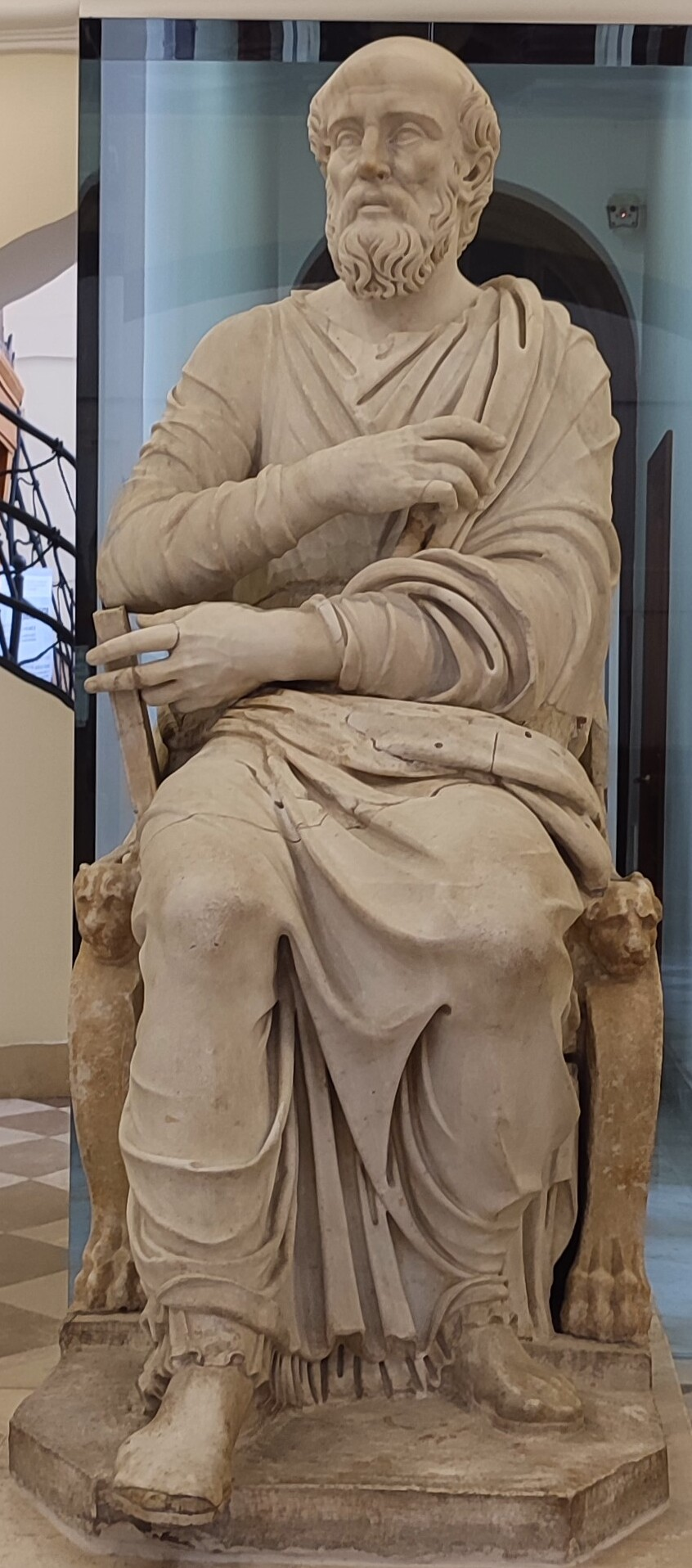
- Statue said to be of Hippolytus, 222 AD. The head is a 16th century addition.

Church Father, Theologian, Martyr
- Born: c. 165 AD; Rome, Italy, Roman Empire
- Died: c. 235 AD (aged 69-70); Sardinia, Sardinia and Corsica, Roman Empire
- Venerated in: Catholic Church; Eastern Orthodox Church; Oriental Orthodoxy; Anglican Communion
- Feast: Catholic: 13 August; Orthodox: 30 January; Coptic: Meshir 6
- Theology career
- Notable work: Philosophumena; Apostolic Tradition
- Theological work
- Era: Patristic Age
- Language: Greek
- Tradition or movement: Trinitarianism
- Main interests: Apologetics, Eschatology, Christology, Exegesis

Hippolytus of Rome (/hɪˈpɒlɪtəs/ hi-POLL-it-əs, Ancient Greek: Ἱππόλυτος; Romanized: Hippólytos, c. 165 – c. 235 AD) was one of the most important Christian thinkers of the second and third centuries, though his provenance, identity, and corpus remain elusive to scholars and historians. Suggested communities include Rome, Palestine, Egypt, Anatolia, and other regions of the Middle East. The best historians of literature in the ancient church, including Eusebius and Jerome, openly admit they cannot name where Hippolytus the biblical commentator and theologian served in leadership. They had read his works but did not possess evidence of his community. Photios I of Constantinople describes him in his Bibliotheca (cod. 121) as a disciple of Irenaeus, who was said to be a disciple of Polycarp; from the context, it seems Photios was suggesting Hippolytus publicly identified himself in this way. But this assertion is doubtful. One older theory claims he came into conflict with the popes of his time and seems to have headed a schismatic group as a rival to the bishop of Rome, thus becoming an antipope. In this view, he opposed the Roman popes because they softened the penitential system to accommodate the large number of new pagan converts. However, he was reconciled to the Church before he died as a martyr.

Starting in the fourth century, various legends arose identifying him as a priest of the Novatianist schism or as a soldier converted by Saint Lawrence. He has also been confused with another martyr of the same name. Pope Pius IV identifies him as "Saint Hippolytus, Bishop of Pontus", martyred in the reign of Severus Alexander, using as a source an inscription on a statue found at the Church of Saint Lawrence in Rome and kept at the Vatican.

== Life ==
Little is known for certain about his community of origin. One Victorian theory suggested that as a presbyter of the church at Rome under Pope Zephyrinus (199–217 AD), Hippolytus was distinguished for his learning and eloquence. It was at this time that Origen, then a young man, heard him preach.

In this view, Hippolytus accused Pope Zephyrinus of modalism, the heresy which held that the names Father and Son are simply different names for the same subject. Hippolytus championed the Logos doctrine of the Greek apologists, most notably Justin Martyr, which distinguished the Father from the Logos ("Word"). An ethical conservative, he was scandalized when Pope Callixtus I (217–222 AD) extended absolution to Christians who had committed grave sins, such as adultery.

Some suggest Hippolytus himself advocated a pronounced rigorism. At this time, he seems to have allowed himself to be elected as a rival Bishop of Rome, and continued to attack Pope Urban I (222–230 AD) and Pope Pontian (230–235 AD). G. Salmon suggests that Hippolytus was the leader of the Greek-speaking Christians of Rome. Allen Brent sees the development of Roman house-churches into something akin to Greek philosophical schools gathered around a compelling teacher.

Also under this view: during the persecution at the time of Emperor Maximinus Thrax, Hippolytus and Pontian were exiled together in 235 to Sardinia, likely dying in the mines. It is quite probable that, before his death there, he was reconciled to the other party at Rome, for, under Pope Fabian (236–250 AD), his body and that of Pontian were brought to Rome. The so-called Chronography of 354 (more precisely, the Liberian Catalogue) reports that on 13 August, probably in 236, the two bodies were interred in Rome, that of Hippolytus in a cemetery on the Via Tiburtina (now known as the Catacomb of Sant'Ippolito), his funeral being conducted by Justin the Confessor. This document indicates that, by about 255, Hippolytus was considered a martyr and gives him the rank of a priest, not of a bishop, an indication that before his death the schismatic was received again into the Church.

== Legends ==
The name Hippolytus appears in various hagiographical and martyrological sources of the early Church. The facts about the life of the writer Hippolytus, as opposed to other celebrated Christians who bore the name Hippolytus, were eventually lost in the West, perhaps partly because he wrote in Hellenic Greek. Pope Damasus I dedicated to a Hippolytus one of his famous epigrams, referring to a priest of the Novatianist schism, a view later forwarded by Prudentius in the 5th century in his "Passion of St Hippolytus". In the Passionals of the 7th and 8th centuries, he is represented as a soldier converted by Saint Lawrence, a legend that long survived in the Roman Breviary. He was also confused with a martyr of the same name who was buried in Portus, of which city he was believed to have been a bishop, who was put to death by drowning in a deep well.

According to Prudentius' account, a martyr Hippolytus was dragged to death by wild horses, a striking parallel to the story of the mythological Hippolytus, who was dragged to death by wild horses at Athens. He described the subterranean tomb of the saint and states that he saw there a picture representing Hippolytus' execution. He also confirms 13 August as the date on which a Hippolytus was celebrated but this again refers to the convert of Lawrence, as preserved in the Menaion of the Eastern Orthodox Church.

The latter account led to a Hippolytus being considered the patron saint of horses. During the Middle Ages, sick horses were brought to St Ippolyts, Hertfordshire, England, where a church is dedicated to him.

== Writings ==
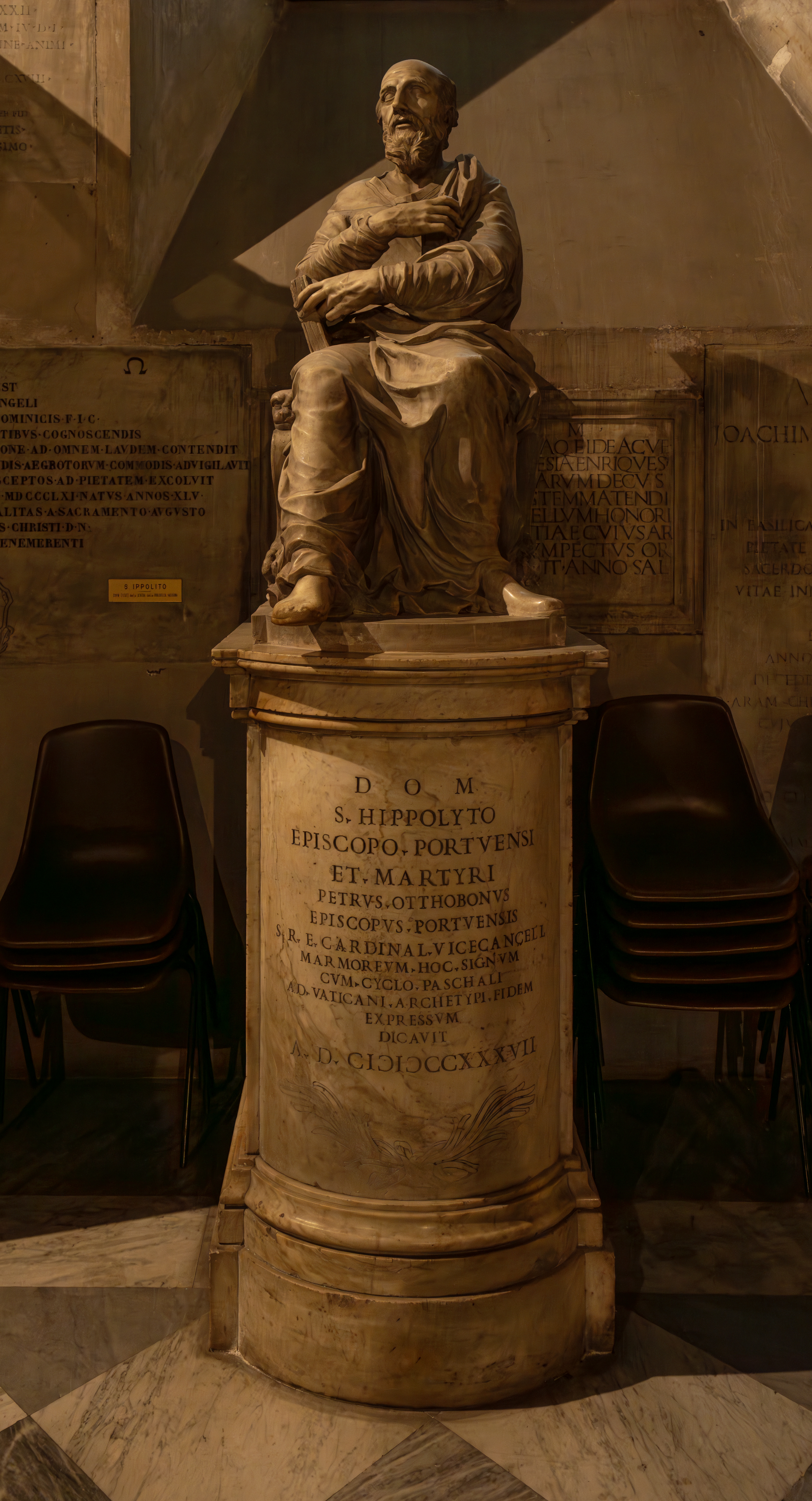
Roman sculpture, maybe of Hippolytus, found in 1551 and used for the attribution of the Apostolic Tradition

Controversy surrounds the corpus of the writer Hippolytus. In the Victorian era, scholars claimed his principal work to be the Refutation of all Heresies. Of its ten books, Book I was the most important. It was long known and was printed (with the title Philosophumena) among the works of Origen. Books II and III are lost, and Books IV–X were found, without the name of the author, in a monastery of Mount Athos in 1842. Emmanuel Miller published them in 1851 under the title Philosophumena, attributing them to Origen of Alexandria. Recent scholarship prefers to treat the text as the work of an unknown author, perhaps of Roman origin.

In 1551 a marble statue of a seated figure (originally female, perhaps personifying one of the sciences) was purportedly found in the cemetery of the Via Tiburtina and was heavily restored. On the sides of the seat was carved a paschal cycle, and on the back the titles of numerous writings by Hippolytus. Many other works are listed by Eusebius and Jerome. The research of Guarducci showed the original statue was a representation of a female figure, reopening the question of its original purpose. Allen Brent analyzed the title list of the statue, questioning Hippolytan authorship of some works.

Hippolytus' voluminous writings, which for variety of subject can be compared with those of Origen, embrace the spheres of exegesis, homiletics, apologetics and polemic, chronography, and ecclesiastical law. The Apostolic Tradition, if it is the work of Hippolytus, recorded the first liturgical reference to the Virgin Mary, as part of the ordination rite of a bishop.

Of exegetical works attributed to Hippolytus, the best preserved are the Commentary on the Prophet Daniel and the Commentary on the Song of Songs. The former contains the earliest reference to the birth of Jesus being celebrated on December 25th.(4.23.3 p.140). The latter is the earliest attested Christian interpretation of the Song, covering only the first three chapters to Song 3:7.

The commentary on the Song of Songs survives in two Georgian manuscripts, a Greek epitome, a Paleo-Slavonic florilegium, and fragments in Armenian and Syriac as well as in many patristic quotations, especially in Ambrose's Exposition on Psalm 118 (119). It is generally regarded as an instruction relating to a post-Baptismal rite of anointing with oil as a symbol of receiving the Holy Spirit. The commentary was originally written as part of a mystagogy, an instruction for new Christians. Scholars have usually assumed the Commentary on the Song of Songs was originally composed for use during Easter, a season favored in the West for Baptism. Hippolytus supplied his commentary with a fully developed introduction known as the schema isagogicum, indicating his knowledge of the rhetorical conventions for teachers discussing classical works. He employs a common rhetorical trope, ekphrasis, using images on the walls or floors of Greco-Roman homes, and in the catacombs as paintings or mosaics. Origen felt that the Song should be reserved for the spiritually mature and that studying it might be harmful for the novice.

Scholars generally ascribe to Hippolytus a work now entitled the Apostolic Tradition, which contains the earliest known ritual of ordination. The influence of Hippolytus was felt chiefly through his works on chronography and ecclesiastical law. His chronicle of the world, a compilation embracing the whole period from the creation of the world up to the year 234, formed a basis for many chronographical works both in the East and West. It is from the Apostolic Tradition that the current words of episcopal ordination in the Catholic Church come from, as updated by Pope Paul VI. Additionally, the 21st chapter of Apostolic Tradition contains what may be a proto-Apostles' Creed.

In the great compilations of ecclesiastical law that arose in the East since the 3rd century, the Church Orders many canons were attributed to Hippolytus, for example in the Canons of Hippolytus or the Constitutions through Hippolytus. How much of this material is genuinely his, how much of it worked over, and how much of it wrongly attributed to him, can no longer be determined beyond dispute, however a great deal was incorporated into the Fetha Negest, which once served as the constitutional basis of law in Ethiopia – where he is still remembered as Abulides. During the early 20th century the work known as The Egyptian Church Order was identified as the Apostolic Tradition and attributed to Hippolytus; at present this attribution is hotly contested.

Differences in style and theology lead some scholars to conclude that some of the works attributed to Hippolytus actually derive from a second author.

Two small but potentially important works, On the Twelve Apostles of Christ and On the Seventy Apostles of Christ, are often neglected because the manuscripts were lost during most of the church age and then found in Greece in the 19th century. The two are included in an appendix to the works of Hippolytus in the voluminous collection of Early Church Fathers. The work on the 70 apostles is noteworthy as a (potentially) early source.

A consensus of scholarship agrees on a core of authentic texts composed by the second-third-century writer Hippolytus, regardless of disputes concerning his community, or the exact dates of his biography: these are the biblical commentaries, including On Daniel, On David and Goliath, On the Song of Songs (partially extant), On the Blessings of Isaac and Jacob, and On the Antichrist. These form a sound basis for exploring and understanding his theology and biblical doctrines.

== Eschatology ==
Hippolytus is an important figure in the development of Christian eschatology. In his biblical compendium and topical study On Christ and the Antichrist and in his Commentary on the Prophet Daniel Hippolytus gave his interpretation of the second advent of Christ.

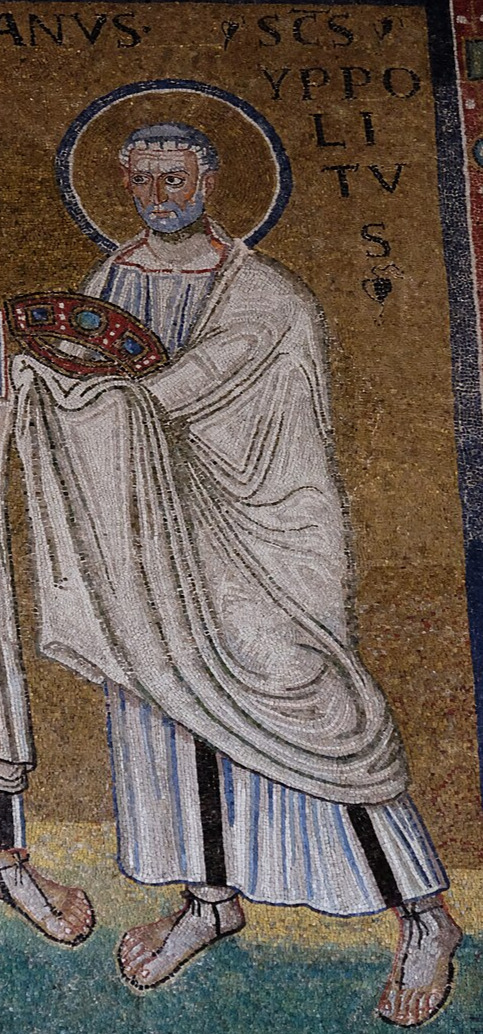
Mosaic of Saint Hippolytus of Rome from San Lorenzo fuori le mura

With the onset of persecutions during the reign of Septimius Severus, many early Christian writers treated topics of apocalyptic eschatology. On Christ and the Antichrist is one of the earliest works. It is thought Hippolytus was generally influenced by Irenaeus. However, unlike Irenaeus, Hippolytus focuses on the meaning of prophecy for the Church in his own time. Of the dogmatic works, On Christ and the Antichrist survives in a complete state and was probably written about 200.

Hippolytus follows the long-established usage in interpreting Daniel's seventy prophetic weeks to be weeks of literal years. Hippolytus gave an explanation of Daniel's paralleling prophecies of chapters 2 and 7, which he, as with the other fathers, specifically relates to the Babylonians, Persians, Greeks, and Romans. His interpretation of events and their significance is Christological.

Hippolytus did not subscribe to the belief that the Second Coming was imminent. In his commentary on Daniel he criticizes those who predict the Second Coming in the near future and then says that six thousand years must pass from Creation before the Second Coming. He also says that Christ was born 5500 years after Adam, so 500 years have to pass from the birth of Christ "to the consummation of the six thousand years, and in this way the end will be".

== Feast days ==
In the Eastern Orthodox Church, the feast day of St Hippolytus falls on 13 August, which is also the Apodosis of the Feast of the Transfiguration. Because on the Apodosis the hymns of the Transfiguration are to be repeated, the feast of St. Hippolytus may be transferred to the day before or to some other convenient day. The Eastern Orthodox Church also celebrates the feast of "St Hippolytus Pope of Rome" on 30 January, who may or may not be the same individual.

The Catholic Church celebrates Saint Hippolytus jointly with Saint Pontian on 13 August. The feast of Saint Hippolytus formerly celebrated on 22 August as one of the companions of Saint Timotheus was a duplicate of his 13 August feast and for that reason was deleted when the General Roman Calendar was Mysterii Paschalis (revised in 1969). Earlier editions of the Roman Martyrology referred to the 22 August Hippolytus as Bishop of Porto. The Catholic Encyclopedia sees this as "connected with the confusion regarding the Roman presbyter resulting from the Acts of the Martyrs of Porto. It has not been ascertained whether the memory of the latter was localized at Porto merely in connection with the legend in Prudentius, without further foundation, or whether a person named Hippolytus was really martyred at Porto, and afterwards confounded in legend with Hippolytus of Rome." This opinion is shared by a Benedictine source.

Earlier editions of the Roman Martyrology also mentioned on 30 January a Hippolytus venerated at Antioch, but the details were borrowed from the story of Hippolytus of Rome. Modern editions of the Martyrology omit mention of this supposed Saint Hippolytus of Antioch.

== See also ==
- Epistle to Diognetus
- Josephus's Discourse to the Greeks concerning Hades (actually by Hippolytus)
- Papal selection before 1059

== Bibliography ==
- Achelis, Hans; Hippolytstudien (Leipzig, 1897).
- Adhémar d'Ales, La Théologie de Saint Hippolyte (Paris, 1906), (G.K.).
- Christian Charles Josias von Bunsen, Hippolytus and his Age (1852, 2nd ed., 1854; Ger. ed., 1853).
- Cross, F. L. (2005). The Oxford Dictionary of the Christian Church. Oxford University Press.
- Ignaz von Döllinger, Hippolytus und Kallistus (Regensb. 1853; Eng. transl., Edinburg, 1876).
- Gerhard Ficker, Studien zur Hippolytfrage (Leipzig, 1893).
- Hippolytus (170–236). Commentary on Daniel, "The Ante-Nicene Fathers", Vol. 5.
- Hippolytus (170–236). Treatise on Christ and Antichrist, "The Ante-Nicene Fathers", Vol. 5.
- Hippolytus, The Treatise on the Apostolic Tradition of Saint Hippolytus of Rome, Bishop and Martyr, Trans Gregory Dix, (London, Alban Press, 1992).
- J. B. Lightfoot, The Apostolic Fathers, Vol. I, part ii (London, 1889–1890).
- Mansfeld, Jaap (1997). Prolegomena - Questions to be Settled before the Study of an Author or a Text. Brill Publishers.
- Karl Johannes Neumann, Hippolytus von Rom in seiner Stellung zu Staat und Welt, part i (Leipzig, 1902).
- Schmidt, T.C. and Nicholas, N.; The Chronicon of Hippolytus, second edition (English translation, rough draft), (2010).
- Smith, Yancy W. (2008). Hippolytus' Commentary On the Song of Songs in Social and Critical Context. Brite Divinity School at Texas Christian University.
