= Karl August Neumann =

German-Austrian food chemist

Karl August Neumann (6 April 1771 in Großbothen – 10 February 1866 in Prague) was a German-Austrian chemist, known for contributions made towards the development of the sugar and flax industries in Bohemia.

Beginning in 1793 he studied cameralistics at the University of Jena. From 1796 he spent several years as a teacher of commercial sciences on the Danish island of Als, then in 1802 relocated to Bohemia as head of a cotton factory in Josefsthal-Kosmanos. He made the acquaintance of Franz Josef von Gerstner, who in 1807 appointed him to the Polytechnic Institute in Prague, where from 1808 to 1817, Neumann worked as a professor of chemistry. In 1817 he was named Kommerzialrat (counsellor of commerce), and from 1817 to 1826, he served on the board of commercial and factory inspections.

== Selected works ==
- Die Behandlung der Feuerwärme (II, 1799–1800).
- Lehrbuch der Chemie mit besonderer Hinsicht auf Technologie (vol. 1, 1810); Textbook of chemistry with particular regard to technology.
- Vergleichung der Zuckerfabrikation aus in Europa einheimischen Gewächsen mit der aus Zuckerrohr in Tropenländern (1837) – Comparison of sugar production from European indigenous plants with that of sugar cane from tropical countries.
- Chemie, als natürliche Grundlage wissenschaftlicher Natur- und Gewerbskunde (1842).
