= Karl Johannes Neumann =

German classical historian (1857–1917)

- Born: September 9, 1857; Glogau near Krotoschin
- Died: October 12, 1917 (aged 60); Munich, Germany
- Education: University of Leipzig; University of Tübingen
- Occupation: classical historian

Karl Johannes Neumann (9 September 1857 in Glogau near Krotoschin – 12 October 1917 in Munich) was a German classical historian.

He studied classical philology, ancient history and church history at the University of Leipzig, later continuing his education at the University of Tübingen. In 1880 he received his doctorate at Leipzig with a dissertation on the anti-Christianity writings of Emperor Julian ("Prolegomena in Juliani imperatoris libros quibus impugnavit Christianos"). Following graduation, he worked as an assistant in the university library at Halle. In 1880 he became an associate professor at the University of Strasbourg, where he gained a full professorship in 1890. In 1909/10 he served as university rector.

== Published works ==
- "Prolegomena in Juliani Imperatoris libros quibus impugnavit Christianos", (dissertation) 1880.
- Strabons Quellen im elften Buche, 1881 – Strabo's sources in the eleventh book.
- Strabons Landeskunde von Kaukasien: Eine Quellenuntersuchung, 1883 – Strabo's "Geographica" of Caucasia: A source investigation.
- Der römische Staat und die allgemeine Kirche bis auf Diocletian (volume 1), 1890 – The Roman state and the general church up until Diocletian.
- Hippolytus von Rom in seiner Stellung zu Staat und Welt. Neue Funde und Forschungen zur Geschichte von Staat und Kirche in der römischen Kaiserzeit, 1902 – Hippolytus of Rome and his position to the state and world.
- Römische Staatsaltertümer. In: Alfred Gercke, Eduard Norden: Einleitung in die Altertumswissenschaft, Volume 3, Issue 4, Third Edition, Leipzig (1923).

He also made contributions to the Ullstein Weltgeschichte (section on the Hellenistic states and the Roman Republic) and to August Pauly's Realencyclopädie der Classischen Altertumswissenschaft.
