= Coinage of Valerian and Gallienus =

Coinage of Valerian and Gallienus, emperors of the Roman Empire

Sestertius
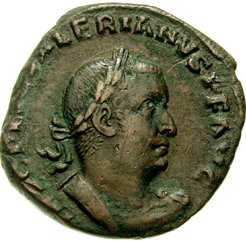
Laureate head of Valerian turned to the right.
Sestertius
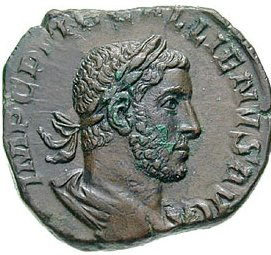
Laureate head of Gallienus turned to the right.

The coinage of Valerian and Gallienus refers to all the coins issued by Rome during the reigns of Emperors Gallienus (253-268) and Valerian (253-260).

== Historical context ==
The period called military anarchy had begun with the assassination of Severus Alexander (last heir of the Severan dynasty), at the instigation of the military officer Maximinus Thrax, who then succeeded him in 235. Maximinus had then been succeeded by a dozen emperors, until Aemilianus in 253. The latter, however, did not last more than three months, also dying at the hands of his own soldiers near Spoleto. He was succeeded in 253 by Valerian, (captured by the Sasanians in 260), and his son Gallienus until 268.

== Valerian (253-260) ==
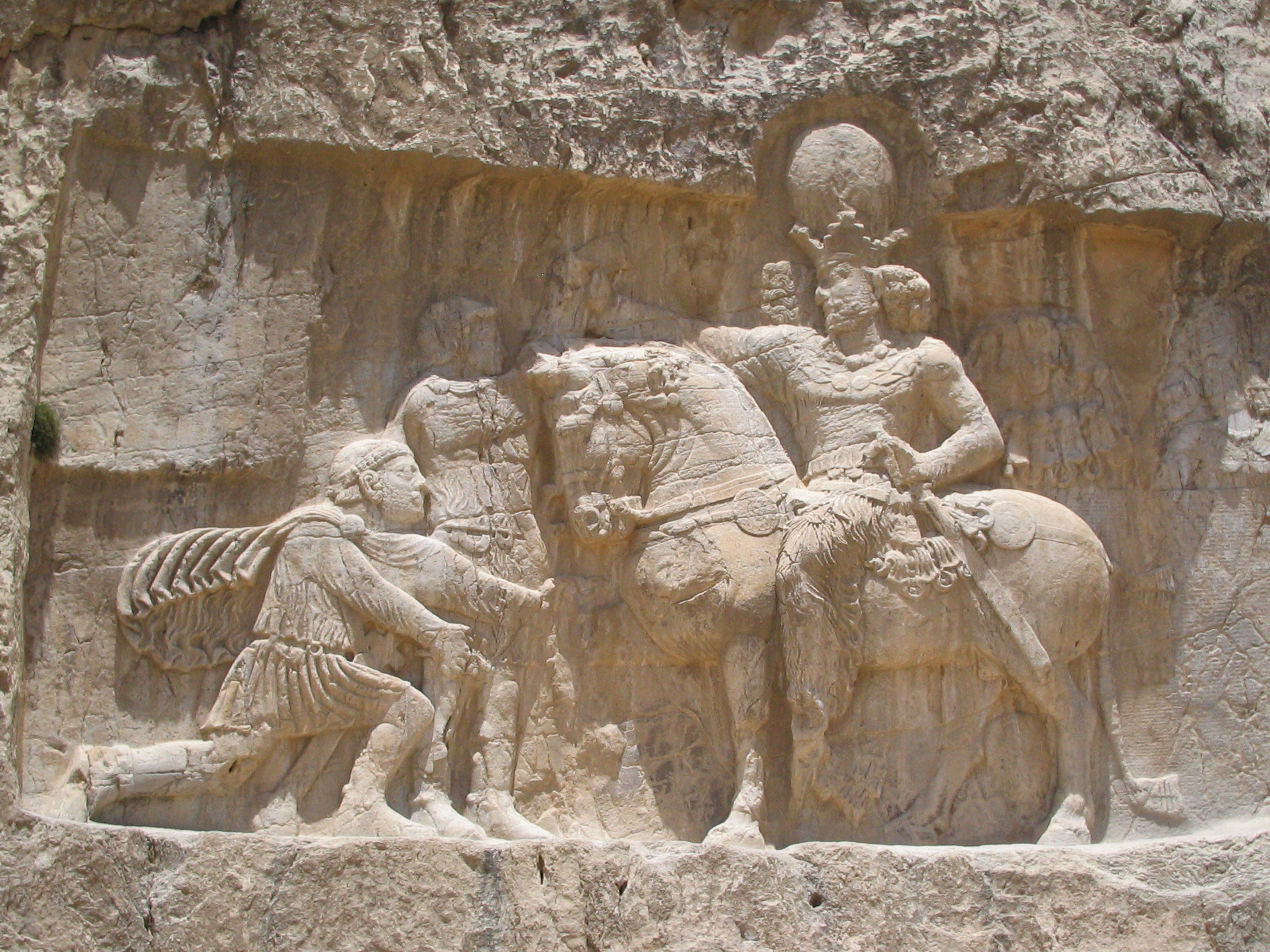
Sasanian relief at Naqsh-e Rostam depicting Shapur I holding Valerian captive and receiving homage from Philip the Arab, kneeling before the Sasanian ruler.

Emperor Trebonianus Gallus asked Valerian for help, appointing him governor of Rhaetia, when Aemilianus, proclaimed emperor by the Danubian troops, marched against Italy. Valerian then marched from Rhaetia, taking the Rhenish troops with him, but he was not in time to save Gallus, who was defeated by Aemilianus and killed by his own men; Valerian's troops, however, refused to recognize the victor and hailed their own general as emperor.

In late July/mid-September 253, the armies of Valerian and Aemilianus clashed, but Aemilianus' soldiers decided to abandon him and killed him near Spoleto, at a bridge called the Sanguinarii, between Oricolum and Narnia. At the same time, a new wave of Goths, Borani, Carpi and Heruli had brought destruction as far as Pessinus and Ephesus by sea, and then by land to the territories of Cappadocia.

It was under these circumstances that Valerian was raised to the purple (October 22, 253). The Roman Senate ratified his appointment as emperor of the troops of Rhaetia. Thus he succeeded Aemilianus. Continued invasions in the north and east forced the new emperor to partition the administration of the Roman state, as had been done in the past by Marcus Aurelius and Lucius Verus; Valerian took jurisdiction over the eastern part of the empire and entrusted the western part to his son Gallienus (253-268).

Imperial title	Number of times	Date
Tribunicia potestas	8 years:	from 253 and renewed annually on December 10 of each year until 260 nine times.
Consulate	4 times:	238? (I), 254 (II), 255 (III) and 257 (IV).
Victory titles		Germanicus Maximus, Parthicus (?) and Restitutor Galliarum, in 254; Restitutor Orientis, ca. 253-260 Restitutor orbis, in the period 254-259 (?).
Salutatio imperatoria	At least 3 times:	the first when he became Augustus in 253, the second when he assumed the title Germanicus Maximus in 254, and the third in 256.
Other titles		Pius, Felix, Pater Patriae and Pontifex Maximus in 253.

=== Main themes ===
==== Concord ====
When Valerian was raised to the purple (Oct. 22, 253), the Roman Senate ratified the appointment of the troops of Rhaetia as emperor, at the same time elevating his son Gallienus to the rank of Caesar. After Valerian arrived in Rome, he decided to raise his son to the rank of co-augustus, while his grandson Cornelius Valerianus or his other son, Valerianus Minor, to that of Caesar. In the Roman Empire at the time of the crisis of the third century, the practice of associating a son with the throne was usual, as in the case of Maximinus Thrax and Maximus, Philip the Arab and Philip II, Decius and Herennius Etruscus, Trebonianus Gallus and Volusianus. In the case of Valerian and Gallienus, in addition to dynastic advantages, the association of the adult son with his father's throne allowed for two emperors perfectly capable of governing, thus giving double force to imperial rule. This was something more akin to what had happened in the mid-2nd century, when, on the death of Antoninus Pius, Marcus Aurelius associated his adopted brother Lucius Verus with the throne. And so father and son divided the administration of the empire and departed as soon as possible for their respective destinations - Gallienus, after being appointed ordinary consul in 254, to the West along the Limes Germanicus, and Valerian to the East. The concord of the two emperors was celebrated in the coinage of the years 253 and 254.

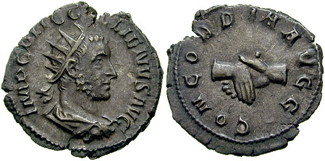
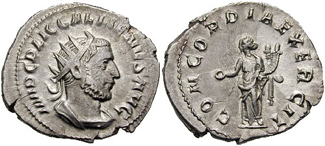
Concordia Augustorum and of the Roman armies
Image	Value	Obverse	Reverse	Date	Weight; diameter	Cataloging
	Antoninianus	IMP C P LIC GALLIENVS AVG, head of Gallienus with radiate crown toward right, the bust with drapery and cuirass;	CONCORDIA AVGG(ustorum), hands clasping in sign of agreement.	253/254	3.05 g (Mint of ancient Rome);	RIC, Gallienus, V pt. 1, 131; Göbl 13t; RSC 125.
	Antoninianus	IMP C P LIC GALLIENVS AVG, head of Gallienus with radiate crown toward right, the bust with drapery and cuirass;	CONCORDIA EXERCIT, Concordia standing toward left, holding a patera and a double cornucopia.	253/254	3.05 g (Mint of ancient Rome);	RIC, Gallienus, V pt. 1, 132, Göbl 15v; RSC 131a.
N.B.: Above are some examples.

==== Germanic campaigns (253-260) ====
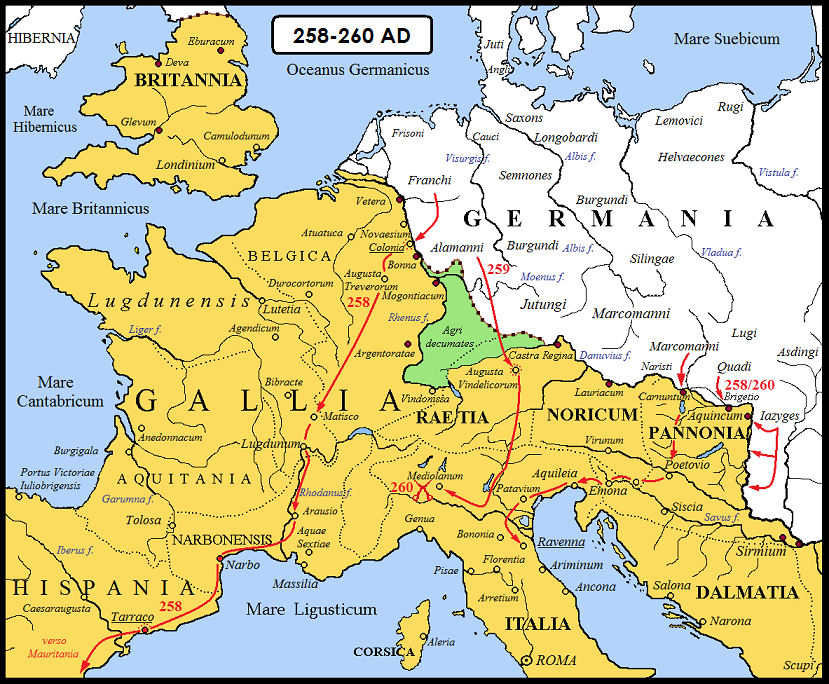
Invasions in the West of Franks, Alamanni, Marcomanni, Quadi, Iazyges and Roxolani of the years 258-260.

Continued raids by barbarians in the two decades following the end of the Severan dynasty had brought the economy and trade of the Roman Empire to its knees. Numerous farms and crops had been destroyed, if not by barbarians, then by bands of brigands and by Roman armies seeking sustenance during military campaigns fought against both external and internal enemies (usurpers to the imperial purple). Moreover, food shortages generated a demand that exceeded the supply of foodstuffs, with obvious inflationary consequences on basic necessities. Added to all this was a constant forced recruitment of soldiers, to the detriment of the manpower employed in the agricultural countryside, resulting in the abandonment of many farms and vast areas of fields to be cultivated. This pressing demand for soldiers, in turn, had generated an implicit race to raise the price of obtaining the imperial purple. Each new emperor or usurper was forced, therefore, to offer his army increasing donations and ever more profitable wages, to the serious detriment of the imperial treasury, which was often forced to cover these extraordinary expenses with the confiscation of huge estates of private citizens, victims in these years of "partisan" proscriptions. These difficulties forced the new emperor, Valerian, to partition the administration of the Roman state with his son Gallienus, entrusting the latter with the western part and reserving the eastern part for himself, as had previously been the case with Marcus Aurelius and Lucius Verus (161-169).

Towards the end of 253 a new incursion of Goths devastated the region of Thessalonica: the Germanic people failed to conquer the city, which, however, only with difficulty and much effort was liberated by the Roman armies of the new emperor Valerian (see coin below from the mint of Viminacium). The panic was so great that the inhabitants of Achaia decided to rebuild the ancient walls of Athens and many other Peloponnesian cities.

At the same time the Franks and Alemanni were stopped in their attempt to break through the Roman limes by the young Caesar Gallienus, who earned for these successes the appellation "Restitutor Galliarum" and "Germanicus maximus." His merit was that he had at least partially contained the dangers, thanks to an agreement with one of the leaders of the Germanic peoples, who undertook to prevent other barbarians from crossing the Rhine and thus oppose new invaders.

In 257 the Rhine front of Germania Inferior was disrupted by new Frankish attacks, who managed to push as far as Mogontiacum, where they were stopped by the advancing Legio VI Gallicana, of which the future emperor Aurelian was military tribune. Gallienus, who had quickly left Illyricum, hurried to the West, succeeding in beating the Frankish hordes near Cologne and after liberating the entire left bank of the Rhine from the barbarian armies (see coins below from the Colonia Agrippinensium mint).

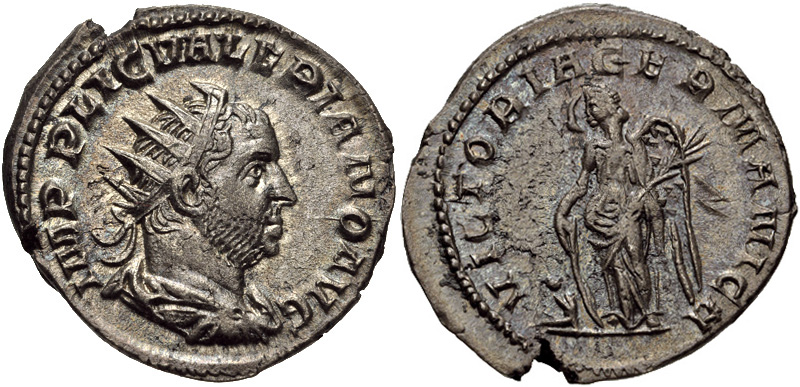
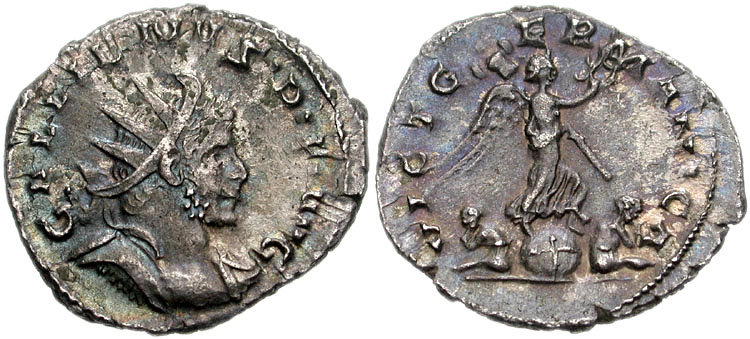
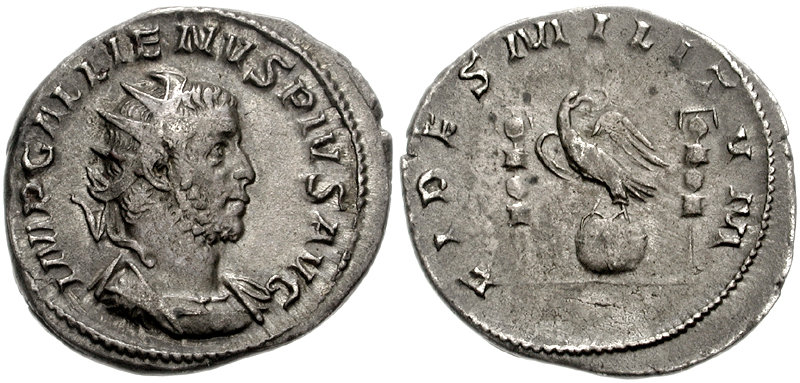
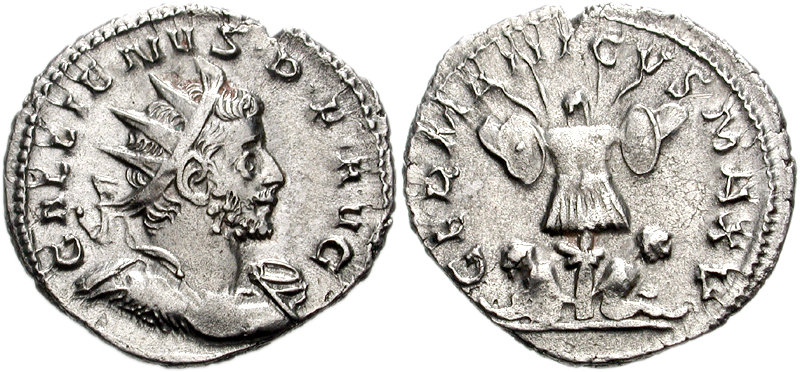
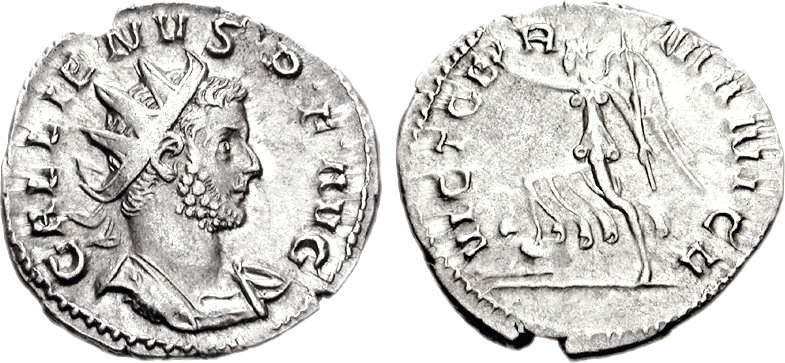
Military campaigns along the Rhine and Danube
Image	Value	Obverse	Reverse	Date	Weight; diameter	Cataloging
	Antoninianus	IMP P LIC VALERIANO AVG, head with crown, wearing cuirass;	VICTORIA GERMANICA, Victory facing left, holding a shield and a palm tree.	253	21 mm, 3.90 g (mint of Viminacium);	RIC Licinius Valerianus, V, 264; MIR 36, 793d; RSC 253.
	Antoninianus	GALLIENVS AVG, head of Gallienus with radiate crown toward right, the bust with drapery and cuirass;	VICT G-ERMANICA, victory above an orb toward right, holds a trophy on the shoulders and a crown between two captives seated on the ground.	257/258 to celebrate the victory over the Germanic peoples;	22 mm, 3.72 g, 6 h (Colonia Agrippinensium mint, first issue);	RIC, Gallienus, V 49; MIR 36, 874l; RSC 1062.
	Antoninianus	IMP GALLIENVS PIUS AVG, head of Gallienus with radiate crown toward right, the bust with drapery and cuirass;	FIDES MILITUM, an eagle facing left sitting on top of an orb, head to the right, holding a crown in its beak; a vexillum to the right and left.	257/258 to celebrate the victory over the Germanic peoples;	21 mm, 3.98 g, 12 h (Colonia Agrippinensium mint, first issue);	RIC, Gallienus, V 11; MIR 36, 871b; RSC 253.
	Antoninianus	GALLIENVS PF AVG, head of Gallienus with radiate crown toward right, the bust with drapery and cuirass;	GERMANICUS MAX V, a trophy, at the base of which are two prisoners sitting on either side, their hands tied.	258 to celebrate the victory over the Germanic peoples and the victory title of Germanicus Maximus for the fifth time;	21 mm, 3.22 g, 12 h (Colonia Agrippinensium mint, first issue);	RIC, Gallienus, V 18; MIR 36, 872l; RSC 308.
	Antoninianus	GALLIENVS PF AVG, head of Gallienus with radiate crown toward right, the bust with drapery and cuirass;	VICT G-ERMANICA, victory advancing to left, holding a trophy and crown, trampling on a Germanic captive.	258/259 to celebrate the victory over the Germanic peoples;	3.43 g, 6 h (Colonia Agrippinensium mint, second issue);	RIC, Gallienus, V 44; MIR 36, 893h; RSC 1061a.
N.B.: Above are some examples.

==== Persian campaigns (254-260) ====
Valerian, after leaving early in his reign for the eastern front, succeeded in driving the Sasanians out of the imperial territories, recapturing Antioch, which had been besieged and then conquered, and then concentrated on reorganizing the entire eastern limes in the following years. However, he had to arrange every possible resistance against the Barbarians from the north, through his generals, when from 254 to 256 new incursions of Goths devastated much of the territories of Thrace, Macedonia, and Pontus, generating panic in the inhabitants of Achaia, so much so that he arranged to rebuild the ancient walls of Athens and many other cities in the Peloponnese. The lowest point was reached in 260, when Valerian was defeated in battle and taken prisoner by the Sasanians, dying in captivity without the possibility of a military expedition to free him.

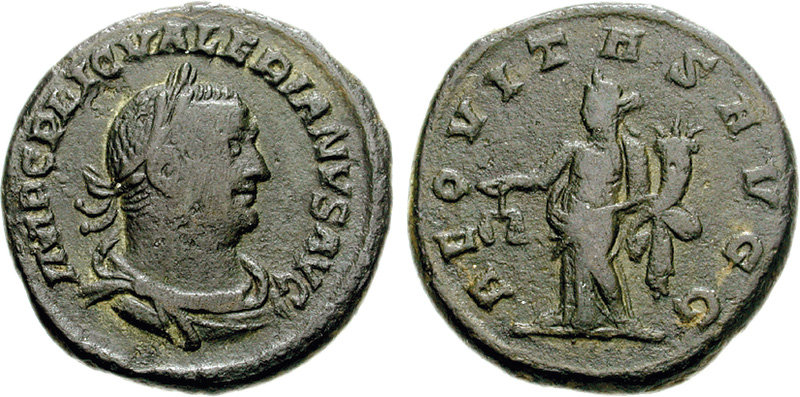
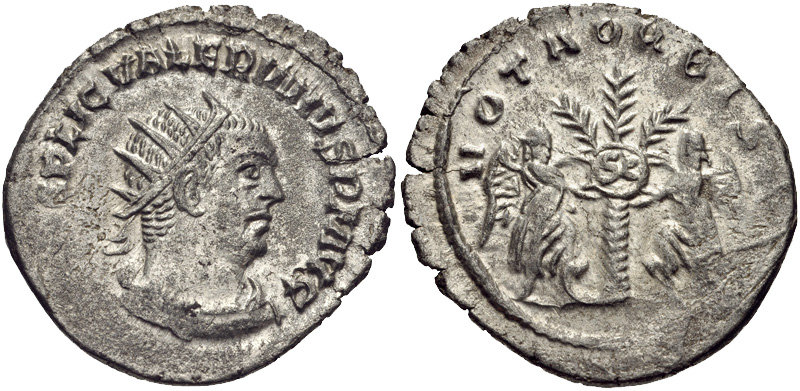
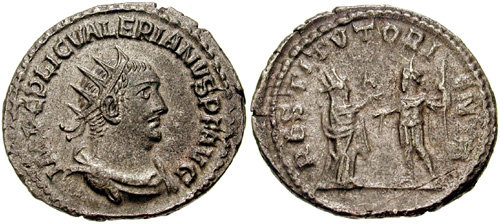
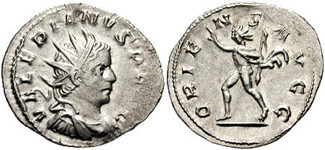
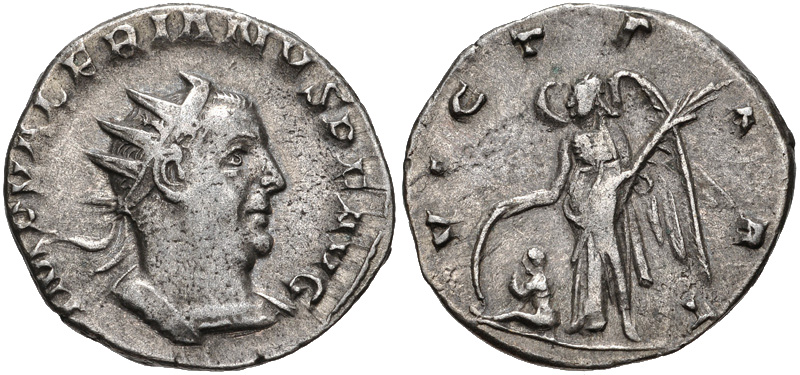
Eastern military campaigns (254-260)
Image	Value	Obverse	Reverse	Date	Weight; diameter	Cataloging
	As	IMP C P LIC VALERIANO AVG, head of Valerian with laurel wreath, wearing cuirass;	Aequitas AUGG, The Aequitas facing left, holding a scale and a cornucopia.	253 ca.	9.69 g, 11 h (at the Antioch mint; a city that became Roman again by 253 after the Sasanian siege and occupation of 252-253);	Roman Imperial Coinage, Licinius Valerianus, V 297; MIR 36, 1558c.
	Antoninianus	IMP P LIC VALERIANO P F AVG, head of Valerian with radiate crown toward right;	Two Victories standing on either side of a palm tree, where they hang a shield inscribed S C.	255/256 ca.	22 mm, 3.69 g, 12 h (mint of Samosata, after the Romans had succeeded in driving out the Sasanians west of the Euphrates in the years 254-255);	Roman Imperial Coinage, Licinius Valerianus, V 295; MIR 36, 1682e; RSC 279.
	Antoninianus	IMP P LIC VALERIANO P F AVG, head of Valerian with radiate crown toward right;	RESTITVT ORI-ENTIS, the East standing to the right extends a wreath to Valerian, who stands in front and looks to the left	256/260 ca.	22 mm, 3.95 g (mint of Samosata, after the Romans had succeeded in driving out the Sasanians west of the Euphrates in the years 254-255);	Roman Imperial Coinage, Licinius Valerianus, V 287; MIR 36, 1685e; RSC 189.
	Antoninianus	IMP P LIC VALERIANUS P F AVG, head with radiate crown, bust with cuirass;	ORIE-N-S AVGG, the Sun walks to the left, holds a whip and raises his right hand.	257/258	3.85 g (Colonia Agrippinensiuum mint);	RIC Licinius Valerianus, V pt. 1, 12; Göbl 868h; RSC 143a.
	Antoninianus	IMP P LIC VALERIANUS P F AVG, head with radiate crown, bust with cuirass;	VICT PART, Victory standing toward left, holding a shield and a palm; a prisoner seated toward left, mourning.	257/258	20 mm, 3.20 g, 6 h (Viminacium mint, 3rd issue);	RIC Licinius Valerianus, V, 262; MIR 847d; cf. RSC 255.
N.B.: Above are some examples.

== Gallienus (253-268) ==
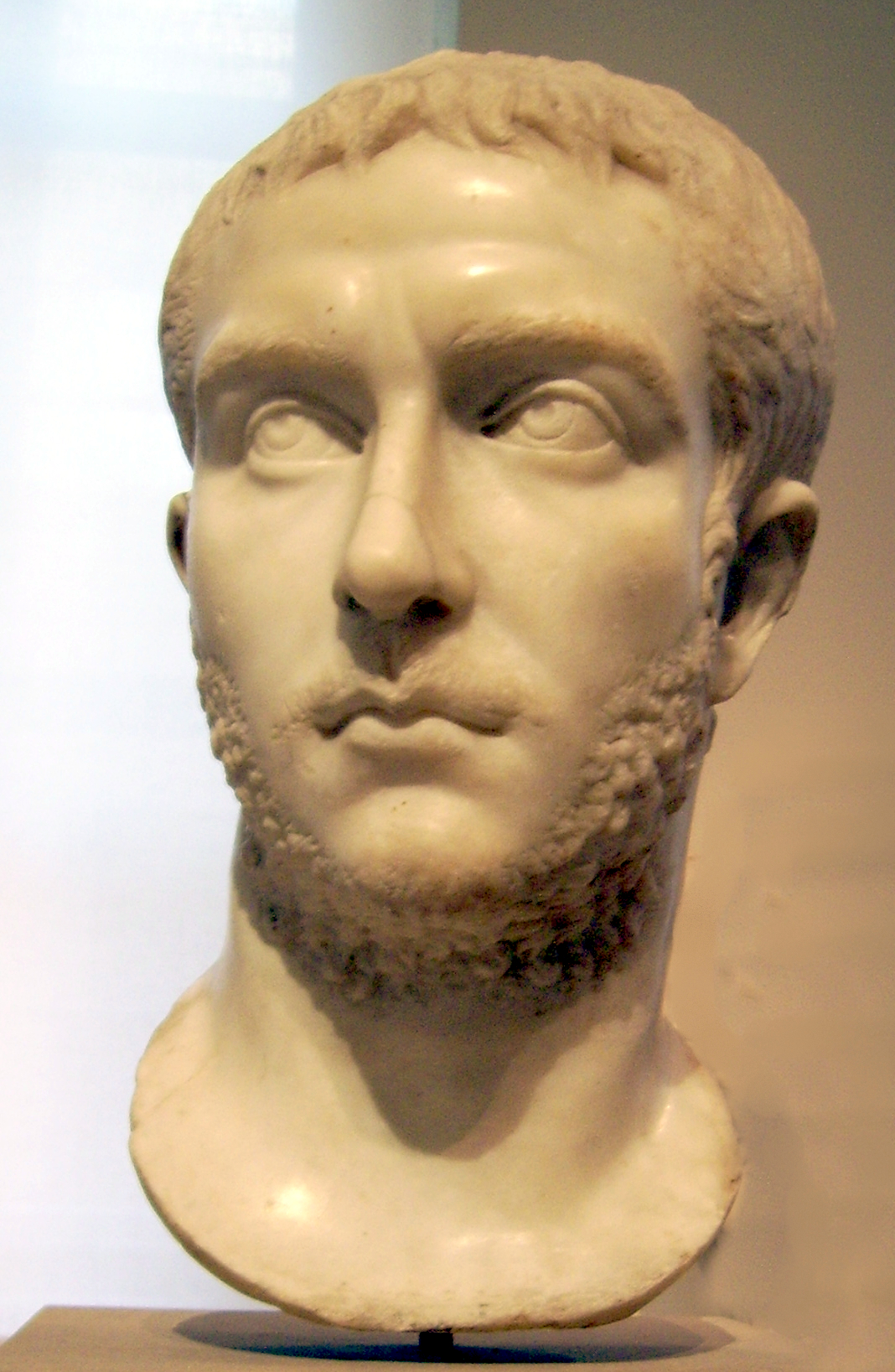
Bust of Emperor Gallienus, son of Valerian.

As a consequence of the severe defeat suffered by his father, Valerian, against the Sasanians, the Empire underwent a split into three parts for nearly fifteen years, but these allowed it to survive: in the West, the Gallic Empire, ruled by usurpers such as Postumus (260-268), Laelian (268), Marcus Aurelius Marius (268-269), Victorinus (269-271), Domitian II (271), and Tetricus (271-274); while in the East the Palmyrene Empire, where first Odaenathus, appointed by Gallienus corrector totius Orientis, alternated from 262, then his son Vaballathus together with his mother Zenobia until 272. Eutropius writes:

Thus, while Gallienus abandoned the government, the Roman Empire was saved in the west by Postumus, and in the east by Odaenathus.

— Eutropio, Breviarium ab urbe condita, 9, 11.

Gallienus, having become sole emperor in the central part of the Empire, had to ask for help in the East from the ruler of Palmyra, Odaenathus, leaving the latter with a kind of sovereignty over the eastern part of the Empire, giving him the title of Dux Orientis, which caused its secession upon the death of the two rulers (in 268). In the military field, Gallienus entrusted the command of the legions, no longer to the senatorial order (legatus legionis), but to the equestrian order (praefectus legionis). Gallienus was assassinated in 268 by Illyrian officers.

While the Roman Empire seems to have gone through one of the "darkest" periods in its history under Gallienus, this emperor represented the turning point in the period of the third-century crisis that had followed the Severan dynasty. It is no coincidence that Gallienus was the first to reign for fifteen years (seven with his father and eight alone), which was very rare considering the first period of military anarchy (from 235 to 253). In fact, no Roman emperor had reigned so long since the time of Septimius Severus (193-211).

Today, modern critics seem to re-evaluate his actions, in an attempt to save at least the “central heart” of the Roman Empire, thus creating the basis for a territorial reunification, which occurred, shortly thereafter, with the Illyrian emperors (268-282). Gallienus, in fact, laid the first foundations for a period of recovery, reconquest and restoration that resulted in the tetrarchic period of Diocletian (284-306).

Imperial title	Number of times	Date
Tribunicia potestas	15 years:	from 253 and renewed annually on December 10 of each year (equal to sixteen times).
Consulate	7 times:	254 (I), 255 (II), 257 (III), 261 (IV), 262 (V), 264 (VI) and 266 (VII).
Victory titles		Germanicus and Restitutor Galliarum, in 254; Dacicus maximus, late 256 - early 257; Germanicus maximus, in 255, twice in 257 and 258 (the fifth time); Parthicus maximus, 262/263 (?); Persicus maximus, in 264-265 (?).
Salutatio imperatoria	12 times:	the first when he was proclaimed Augustus by his father in 253, the last in 264/265.
Other titles		Pater Patriae in 255 (?) and Pontifex Maximus in 211.

=== Opening of new imperial mints ===
The third-century crisis of the Roman Empire and its militarization caused an initial decentralization and multiplied mints near areas with a high concentration of military personnel, areas where the demand for coins was high. In addition, usurpations caused the emergence of ephemeral mints.

In 257 Gallienus opened a new mint at Colonia Agrippinensium (now Cologne) in Germania Inferior. A few years later, in 260-261, he opened a new mint at Mediolanum, with a series of at least 23 types of coins, known as the "legion series," where they were represented in their names, insignia-symbols and legends. The series consisted of antoniniani, a silver coin worth two denarii.

From 262 Mediolanum issues were also marked with the workshop mark (P(rima), S(ecunda) and T(ertia)) preceded by the words “M(ediolanum).” There, Gallienus also minted aurei, gold and silver quinarii, dupondii and asses, albeit in limited numbers. In late 267 and early 268, during the siege of Milan by Gallienus against Aureolus (who had his headquarters in Mediolanum), the mint produced coins of the usurper, Postumus, at the head of the Gallic Empire.

Another mint was established at Siscia in 262 by Gallienus for the purpose of having money production available, in case of need, in the outlying provinces, where the defense needs of the empire made military expenditures necessary; for this reason, it was used intermittently during the joint reign of the two emperors and then during the reign of Gallienus alone, probably when the imperial court was in the Balkans.

=== Main themes ===
==== Germanic campaigns (260-268) ====
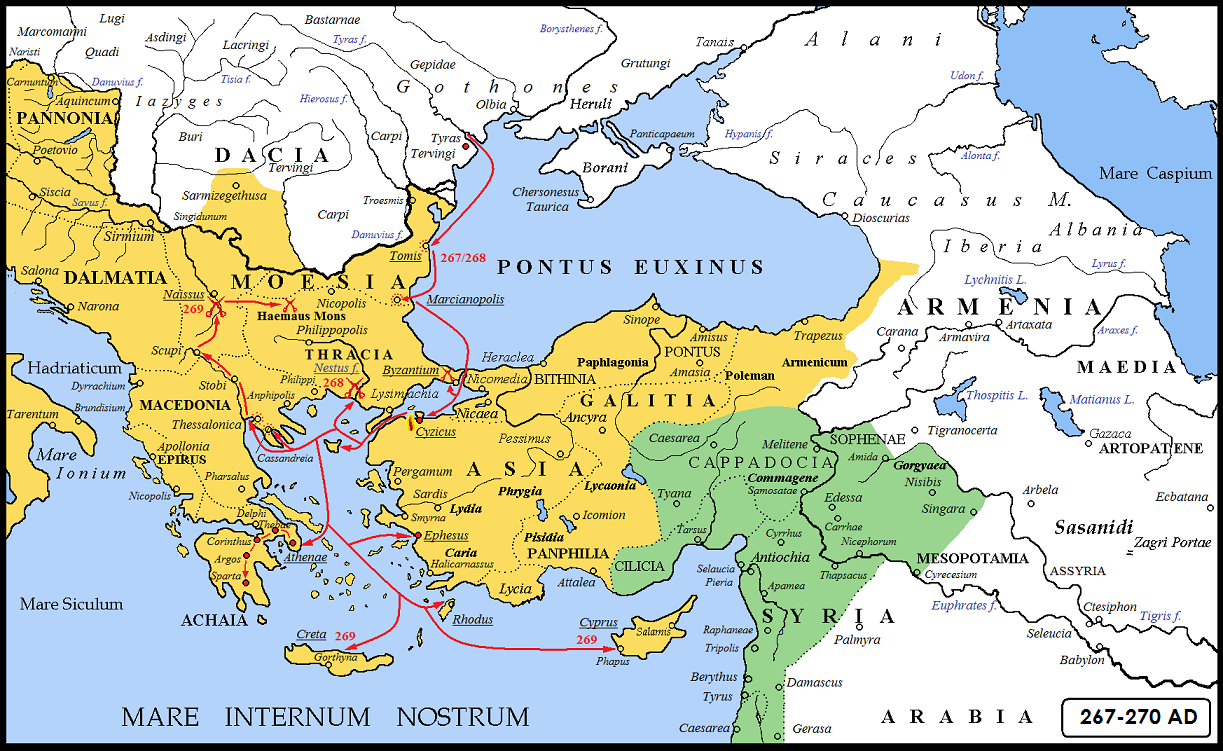
The invasion of the Gothic peoples of 267/268-270 during the reigns of Gallienus and Claudius Gothicus. In green color the Palmyrene Empire of Queen Zenobia and Vaballathus.

During 260 the territories that formed an indentation between Rhine and Danube, south of the so-called Germanic-Rhaetian limes (the Agri Decumates) were abandoned for the benefit of the Suebian populations of the Alemanni. It was probably Gallienus who decided on the final abandonment of all the territories east of the Rhine and north of the Danube, due to the continuous invasions of the neighboring Germanic tribes of the Alemanni, and the simultaneous secession of the western part of the empire, led by the governor of Upper and Lower Germania, Postumus. The Alemanni, who had broken through the Rhaetian limes and crossed the Brenner Pass, had pushed into Italy, where they were intercepted and beaten by Gallienus's armies near Milan. At the same time, along the Limes of Lower Germania, hordes of Franks managed to seize the legionary fortress of Castra Vetera and besieged Cologne, while sparing Augusta Treverorum (today's Trier). Others swept along the coast of Gaul and devastated some villages as far as the mouths of the Seine and Somme rivers.

The following year (in 261) a new incursion by the Alemanni into the Moselle area was stopped by Postumus' armies. The Roman counteroffensive was, in fact, led by the ex-governor, now regent of the Gallic Empire, earning the proclamation of the "Victoria germanica." For these successes, he assumed the appellation of "Restitutor Galliarum" ("restorer of Gaul"), also deciding to recruit bands of newly defeated Frankish soldiers into the ranks of his army to fight against their own "brothers," as testified by Aurelius Victor.

With the end of 267 or the beginning of 268, a new and immense invasion by a coalition of the Germano-Sarmatian peoples, under the command of the Goths, took shape from the mouth of the Tyras River (near the city of the same name) and began the most striking invasion of the third century, which disrupted the coasts and hinterlands of many Balkan-Asian provinces, such as the Moesias, Thracia, and Achaia, overlooking Pontus Euxinus and the Aegean Sea. The barbarian hordes also brought devastation to the hinterland of the province of Macedonia, until Gallienus, near the mouth of the river Nestos, intercepted one of the Gothic armies and slaughtered them (spring of 268). Soon afterward, however, Gallienus was forced to return to Italy to besiege the usurper Aureolus, who had attempted to usurp his throne, in Milan. Shortly afterward Gallienus was assassinated by his generals.

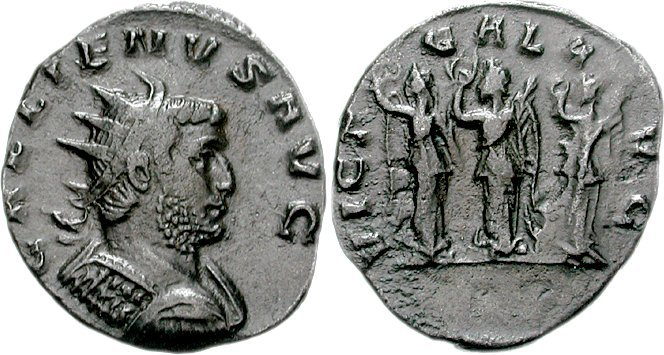
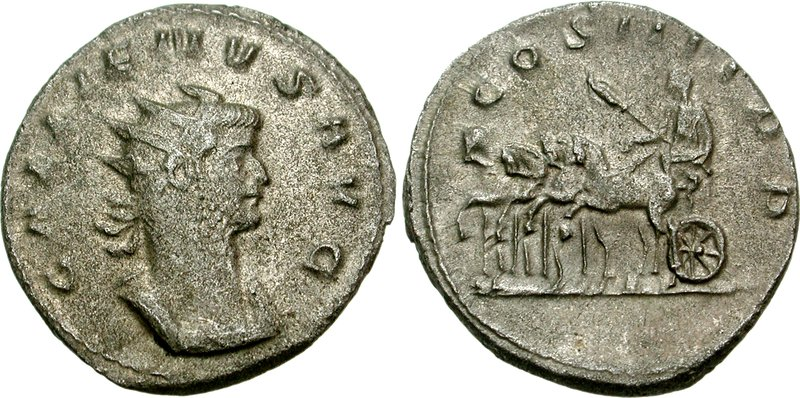
Military campaigns of Gallienus against the Germanic peoples (260-268)
Image	Value	Obverse	Reverse	Date	Weight; diameter	Cataloging
	Antoninianus	GALLIENVS AVG, head of Gallienus with radiate crown toward right, the bust with drapery and cuirass;	VICT GAL AUG, three Victories standing, facing to the left, each holding a crown and a palm frond.	260/261-262	2.92 g, 6 h (Mint of Ancient Rome, sixth issue);	RIC, Gallienus, V 294; MIR 36, 368o; RSC 1034.
	Antoninianus	GALLIENVS AVG, head of Gallienus with radiate crown toward right, the bust with drapery and cuirass;	COS IIII P P, Gallienus, triumphant, leads a quadriga to the left, holding a branch in his left hand and the reins in his right.	260/261-262	3.70 g, 12 h (Mint of Ancient Rome, first workshop, sixth issue);	RIC, Gallienus, V 150 var. (bust type); MIR 36, 339x; RSC 146 var. (bust type).
N.B.: Above are some examples.

==== Army ====
Realizing the impossibility of simultaneously protecting all the provinces of the empire with a static line of men positioned close to the frontier, Gallienus developed a practice that had begun in the late second century under Septimius Severus (with the placement of a legion, the Legio II Parthica, a few kilometers from Rome), that is, by positioning a strategic reserve of well-trained soldiers ready to intervene where they were needed in the shortest possible time (cavalry contingents at Mediolanum, Sirmium, Poetovio and Lychnidos).

In accordance with these considerations, Gallienus around the years 264-268, or perhaps shortly before, established this central strategic reserve (which was to form the basis of Diocletian's future army reform), consisting mainly of heavy cavalry units equipped with armor (the so-called promoti, among whom were the equites Dalmatae, equites Mauri and Osroeni), since these covered greater distances in less time than legionary or auxiliary infantry. And whenever the barbarians broke through the Roman limes and into the interior provinces, the “strategic reserve” could thus intervene with disruptive force. The main base chosen by Gallienus for the new army was placed in Milan, a strategic point equidistant from Rome and the nearby northern frontiers of Rhaetia and Noricum. It was also necessary because of the loss of the Agri Decumates between the Rhine and the Danube, which had brought the neighboring Germanic peoples closer to the Italic peninsula, the center of imperial power.

The generals who commanded this force, therefore, had tremendous power in their hands, and it is no accident that future augusti such as Claudius Gothicus or Aurelian held this post before they became emperors. The provision for cavalry concerned not only auxiliary forces and numbers, but also the legions themselves, where the number of horsemen increased from 120 to 750 per legion.

Gallienus' reform also removed all military offices from the senators; whereas in the past legion commanders (legatus legionis) came from the Senate apart from those who commanded the Egyptian legions, they now came from the equestrian class (praefectus legionis). Gallienus merely formalized a practice that had already existed from the time of Augustus regarding the legions stationed in Egypt and expanded with Septimius Severus, regarding those stationed in the new province of Mesopotamia (such as the I and III Parthica) and in Italy at the castrum in the Alban Hills, south of Rome (Legio II Parthica). This could also be explained by the fact that the senators were now more interested in living in the luxury of their villas in Italy than in the constraints that military life in the provinces required.

This point of the reform, however, permanently eliminated any connection between the legions and Italy, since the new commanders, who were often career military men who had started from the lowest ranks and worked their way up to the highest, were interested only in their own benefit or at best in the interests of their home province, but not in Rome. The legions were celebrated, therefore, in a new coinage series, called “legionary antoniniani.”

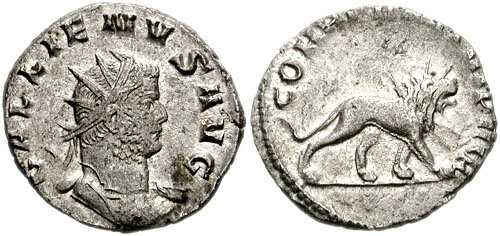
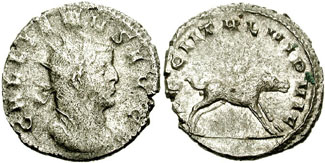
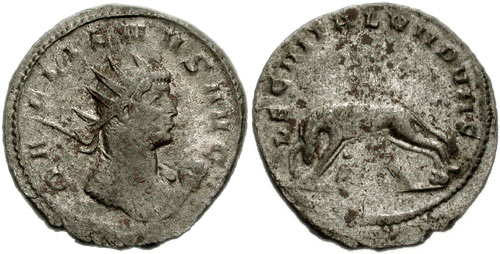
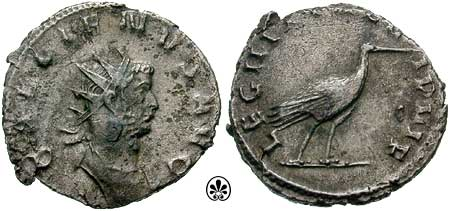
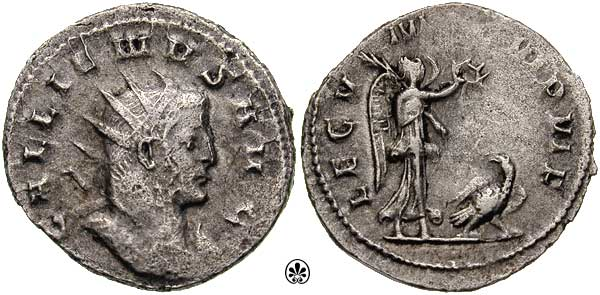
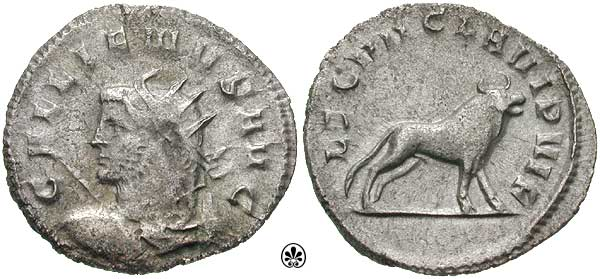
Gallienus and the army
Image	Value	Obverse	Reverse	Date	Weight; diameter	Cataloging
	Antoninianus	GALLIENUS AVG, radiate head of Gallienus toward right;	COHH PRAET VI P VI F, a “radiate‘’ lion, symbol of the praetorian cohorts, walking to the right.	260;	19 mm, 2.46 gr, 5 h (mint of Mediolanum);	RIC, Gallienus, RIC V 370; MIR 36, 979r; Cunetio 1434; RSC 105.
	Antoninianus “legionary series”	GALLIENVS AVG, radiate head and bust with cuirass.	LEG I ITAL VI P(ia) VI F(idelis), a wild boar (symbol of the legion facing right).	260/261	3.73 g (mint of Mediolanum);	RIC V 320; MIR 36, 986n; RSC 455.
	Antoninianus “legionary series”	GALLIENVS AVG, radiate head and bust with cuirass.	LEG II ITAL VI P(ia) VI F(idelis), a she-wolf with twins (symbol of the legion facing right).	260/261	21 mm, 2.68 g (mint of Mediolanum);	RIC 329; MIR 36, 993j; Cunetio -; RSC 474a. VF.
	Antoninianus “legionary series”	GALLIENVS AVG, radiate head and bust with cuirass.	LEG III ITAL VI P(ia) VI F(idelis), a stork (symbol of the legion facing right).	260/261	4.23 g (mint of Mediolanum);	RIC V pt. 2, 339; Göbl, MIR 36, 999r; RSC (Cohen) 487.
	Antoninianus “legionary series”	GALLIENVS AVG, radiate head and bust with cuirass.	LEG V MAC VI P(ia) VI F(idelis), Victory facing right, holding a palm; an eagle at her feet facing right.	261	3.54 g (mint of Mediolanum);	RIC V pt. 1, 345; Göbl 1007n; RSC 504.
	Antoninianus “legionary series”	GALLIENVS AVG, radiate head and bust with cuirass.	LEG VII CLA VI P(ia) VI F(idelis), a bull moving to the right.	261	(mint of Mediolanum);	RIC V pt.2, 348 var. (CL opposed to CLA); Göbl 1006i var. (idem); Cunetio 1465 var. (idem); RSC 512 var. (idem).
N.B.: Above are some examples.

==== Persian campaigns (260-266) ====
After the defeat and imprisonment of Emperor Valerian in 260 at the Battle of Edessa by the Persians, Gallienus left the Roman East at the mercy of Shapur I, who managed to occupy not only Tarsus and Antioch, but also the entire Roman province of Mesopotamia and Caesarea in Cappadocia after a strenuous defense.

The following Sasanian campaigns of Odaenathus, a Roman ally, in 264 pushed the Roman armies even beyond the Tigris river, so much so that Emperor Gallienus was given the title of Persicus maximus at the end of this new advance into enemy territory. Odaenathus pushed as far as the Persian capital Ctesiphon, for the second time, probably during this second military campaign. The following year (in 265), the Historia Augusta records that when Gallienus learned that

Odaenathus had ravaged the Persians, brought Nisibis and Carrhae under the sway of Rome, made all of Mesopotamia ours, and finally arrived at Ctesiphon, put the king to flight, captured the satraps and killed large numbers of Persians, he gave him a share in the imperial power, conferred on him the name Augustus, and ordered coins to be struck in his honour, which showed him haling the Persians into captivity. This measure the senate, the city, and men of every age received with approval.

— Historia Augusta - The Two Gallieni, 12.1.

As a result of these victorious campaigns, imperial authority in the East was restored; Emperor Gallienus was able to celebrate a triumph, thanks to his "rector Orientis," Odaenathus, who shared his victories with his eldest son Hairan and earned the honorific title of king of kings, as opposed to that of the Sasanian king, Shapur I.

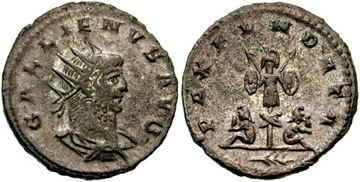
Military campaigns in the East
Image	Value	Obverse	Reverse	Date	Weight; diameter	Cataloging
	Antoninianus	GALLIENVS AVG, head of Gallienus with radiate crown toward right, the bust with drapery and cuirass;	PAX FVNDATA, a trophy of arms with two Sasanian captives at its feet; a palm tree in the exergue.	264/265 to celebrate the Roman-Palmyrene armies of Odaenathus who had succeeded in reaching the Sasanian capital, Ctesiphon	3.51 gr (mint of Antioch);	RIC, Gallienus, V pt. 1, 164; RSC 73; Göbl 738b.
	Aureus	GALLIENVS PF AVG, laureate head of Gallienus toward left;	VBIQVE PAX (peace everywhere), Victory on a chariot to the right, holding reins in her left hand, a whip in her right.	264/267 to celebrate the Roman triumph at the end of Odaenathus' Sasanian campaigns;	5.80 approx. (mint of ancient Rome);	RIC, Gallienus, 72; Cohen 1018; cf. similar coin Cohen 1015, RIC 74.
N.B.: Above are some examples.

==== Imperial family ====
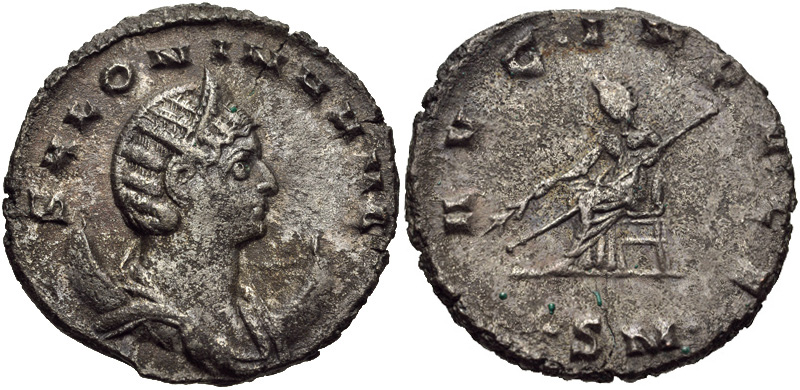
Imperial family
Image	Value	Obverse	Reverse	Date	Weight; diameter	Cataloging
	Antoninianus	Salonina AVG, bust with drapery facing right.	AVG IN PACE, Salonina (wife of Gallienus) seated toward left on throne, holding an olive branch and a scepter; SM.	267/268	20 mm, 3.44 g, 5 h (2nd workshop of the Mediolanum mint);	RIC V 58; MIR 36, 1375e; RSC 17.
N.B.: Above are some examples.

==== Usurpers and secessions ====
Roman Empire of “legitimate” emperors at the center, with the Gallic Empire in the West, the Palmyrene Empire in the East, at the height of the period of Military Anarchy (260-274).

Valerian's death had the main effect of causing Gallienus' enemies to take advantage of it, both by threatening the imperial borders and its provinces (since Gallienus alone could not defend all the Roman territories) as well as by supporting numerous local usurpations that guaranteed the imperial presence there (such as Piso, Valens, or Mussius Aemilianus, in addition to the more famous Ingenuus, Regalianus and Aureolus). And so beginning in 260 (until about 274), the Roman Empire suffered the secession of two vast territorial areas, which, however, also allowed its survival:

- in the west, the usurpers of the Gallic Empire (comprising Britain, Gaul, and Hispania) such as Postumus (260-268), Laelian (268), Marcus Aurelius Marius (268-269), Victorinus (269-271), Domitian II (271), and Tetricus (271-274). Postumus had succeeded, in fact, in establishing an empire in the West, centered on the provinces of Germania Inferior and Gallia Belgica and joined shortly afterwards by all the other Gallic, British, Hispanic provinces and, for a short time, even that of Rhaetia.
- In the east, it was instead the Palmyrene Empire that took over from Rome in the government of the eastern provinces of Asia Minor, Syria and Egypt, defending them from Sasanian attacks, first with Odaenathus (260-267), appointed “Corrector Orientis” by Gallienus, and then with his secessionist widow, Zenobia (267-271).

Eutropius wrote:

So when Gallienus abandoned the state, the Roman Empire was preserved by Postumus in the West and Odaenathus in the East.

— Eutropius, Breviarium ab urbe condita, 9, 11.

In addition to the secessions highlighted above, Gallienus had to cope with a continuous series of usurpations, mostly among the commanders of the eastern (Macrianus Major, Macrianus Minor, Quietus and Balista) and Danubian military provinces (a period referred to as the “thirty tyrants”). He, forced to fight on several fronts simultaneously to defend the legitimacy of his throne, employed a large part of the armies assigned to defend the imperial borders to counter many of these generals who had proclaimed themselves emperors. The result was that large strategic sectors of the limes were left unprotected, thus provoking in the years 261 and 262 a new invasion by the Sarmatians into Pannonia. It was only as a result of an intervention by Gallienus that the invaders were repelled.

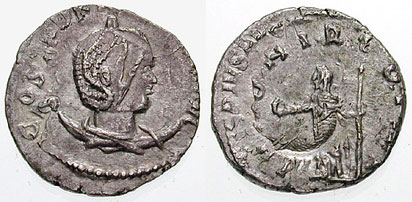
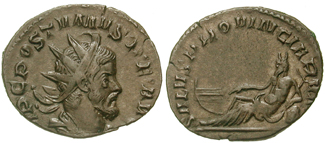
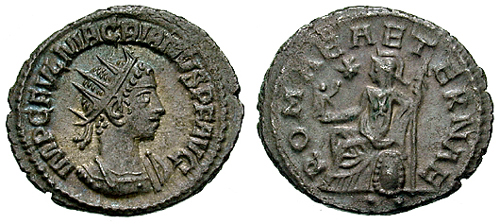
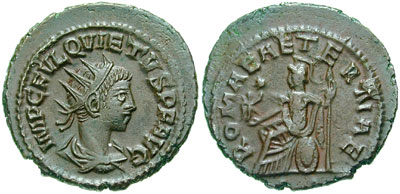
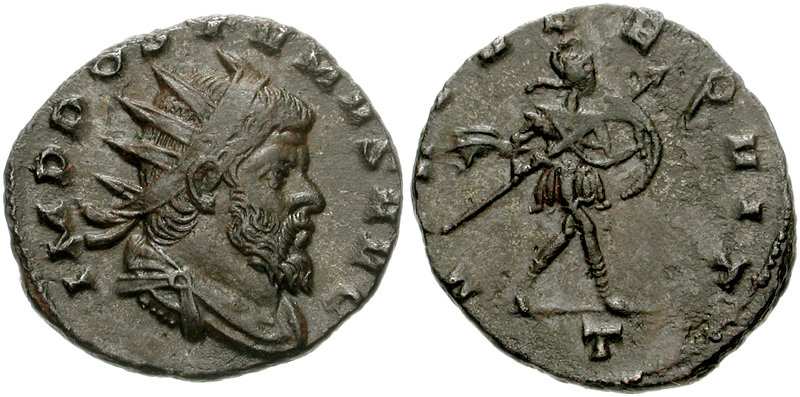
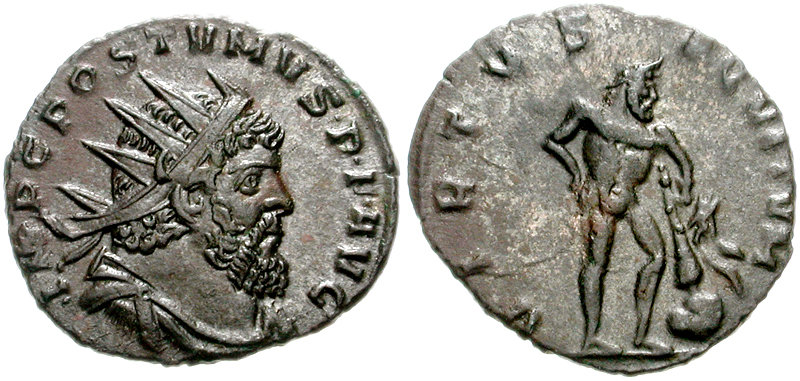
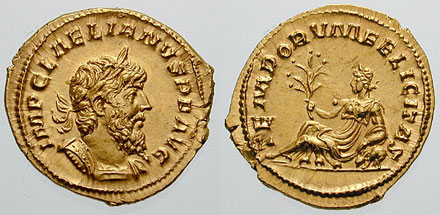
Usurpers and the Gallic Empire (260-274)
Image	Value	Obverse	Reverse	Date	Weight; diameter	Cataloging
	Antoninianus	SVLP [DRYANTILLA] AVG (wife of Regalianus), bust with diadem and drapery facing right;	[IVN]ONI RED[INE], Juno facing left, holding a patera and a scepter.	260	3.36 gr (Carnuntum mint);	RIC V pt. 2, 2; Göbl C11, pl. 4, 11; Cohen 1.
	Antoninianus	IMP C POSTVMVS PF AVG, radiate head of Postumus, bust with drapery and cuirass toward right;	SALVS PROVINCIARVM (“salvation of the [Rhine] provinces”), personification of the Rhine River, lying along the left side, holding a ship's prow (?) in the right.	260	2.65 gr (mint of Augusta Treverorum);	RIC V 87; AGK 88c; RSC 355b.
	Antoninianus	IMP C FVL MACRIANVS PF AVG, radiate head of Macrianus Minor, bust with drapery and cuirass toward right;	ROMAE AETERNAE, Rome seated toward left on a shield, holding Victory and a spear.	260/261	3.59 gr (Antioch mint?);	RIC V pt. 2, 11; Göbl 1738k.
	Antoninianus	IMP C FVL QVIETVS PF AVG, radiate head of Quietus, bust with drapery and cuirass toward right;	ROMAE AETERNAE, Rome seated toward left on a shield, holding Victory and a spear.	260/261	4.05 gr (Antioch mint?);	RIC V pt. 2, 9; RSC 11b.
	Antoninianus	IMP POSTVMVS AVG, radiate head and bust with drapery and cuirass of the emperor of Gaul.	VIRTUS EQUIT, Virtue advancing to the right, holding a spear and a shield; below it reads: T.	268	20 mm, 3.39 g, 12 h (3rd workshop of the Mediolanum mint; 3rd issue)	RIC 388; Mairat 224-5; AGK 111b; RSC 441.
	Antoninianus	Radiate head and bust with drapery and cuirass of the emperor of Gaul, Postumus.	Hercules facing right, holding in his left hand a lion's skin and a club resting on a boulder, his other hand resting on his right hip.	268	18 mm, 2.20 g, 11 h (2nd workshop of the Mediolanum mint; 5th issue)	RIC V 389; Mairat -; AGK 113; RSC 443.
	Aureus	IMP C LAELIANVS PF AVG, laureate head of Laelian, bust with drapery and cuirass toward right;	TEMPORVM FELICITAS, a female figure (Hispania) lying to the left, holding a branch in her right hand and resting her left arm on a hare.	268	6.12 gr (Mogontiacum mint?);	RIC V pt. 2, 1; Schulte 2 (Av1/Rv2); Gilljam pg. 38, 5-7; Elmer 623; Cohen 2.
N.B.: Above are some examples.

== See also ==
- Valerian
- Gallienus

== Bibliography ==
Primary sources

- Aurelius Victor. Epitome de Caesaribus and De Vita et Moribus Imperatorum Romanorum.
- Corpus Inscriptionum Latinarum.
- Cassius Dio. Roman History, LXXIV-LXXX.
- Herodian. History of the Empire from the Death of Marcus.
- Eutropius. Breviarium historiae romanae.
- Jordanes. De origine actibusque Getarum.
- Historia Augusta.
- Orosius. Historiarum adversus paganos libri septem, book 7.
- Zonaras. Historiae Romanorum excerpta.
- Zosimus. New History, I.

Modern historiographical sources

- de Blois, Lukas (1976). The policy of the emperor Gallienus. BRILL. ISBN 9789004045088.
- Belloni, Gian Guido (2004). La moneta romana. Società, politica, cultura. Roma.
- Cascarino, Giuseppe (2009). L'esercito romano. Armamento e organizzazione, Vol. III - Dal III secolo alla fine dell'Impero d'Occidente. Rimini: Il Cerchio. ISBN 978-88-8474-215-5.
- Chiaravalle, Maila (1990). La produzione delle zecche di Milano e di Ticinum, in Catalogo della Mostra "Milano capitale dell'Impero romani (286-402 d.C.)". Milano.
- Gibbon, Edward (1776). The History of the Decline and Fall of the Roman Empire.
- Göbl, Robert (2000). Die Münzprägung der Kaiser Valerianus I., Gallienus, Saloninus (253/268), Regalianus (260) und Macrianus, Quietus (260/262). Vienna. ISBN 3-7001-2923-8.
- Grant, Michel (1984). Gli imperatori romani, storia e segreti. Roma. ISBN 88-541-0202-4.
- Rodríguez González, Julio (2003). Historia de las legiones Romanas (in Spanish). Madrid.
- von Kenner, Friedrich (1889). Il medaglione romano, in Rivista italiana di numismatica. Milano.
- Le Bohec, Yann (1992–2008). L'esercito romano. Da Augusto alla fine del III secolo (in Italian). Roma. ISBN 88-430-1783-7.
- Mazzarino, Santo (1973). L'impero romano (in Italian). Bari. ISBN 88-420-2377-9. e.
- Mócsy, András (1974). Pannonia and Upper Moesia. Londra.
- Rémondon, Roger (1975). La crisi dell'impero romano, da Marco Aurelio ad Anastasio (in Italian). Milano.
- Scarre, Chris (1999). Chronicle of the roman emperors. New York. ISBN 0-500-05077-5.
- Southern, Pat (2001). The Roman Empire: from Severus to Constantine. Londra & New York. ISBN 0-415-23944-3.
- Watson, Alaric (1999). Aurelian and the Third Century. Londra & New York. ISBN 0-415-30187-4.

Abbreviations

- BMCRE = H.Mattingly, Coins of the roman empire in the British Museum, London 1923-1975, vol.6 (vol.VI da Pertinace a Pupieno).
- Cohen = H.Cohen, Description Historique des monnaies frappées sous l'Empire Romain, Paris, 1880-1892, vol.III-IV.
- RIC = Roman Imperial Coinage, vol.10 di H. Mattingly, E.A. Sydenham, Londra 1926-1994 (vol. V).
- RSC = H.A. Seaby & D.R.Sear, Roman Silver Coins vol.5, London 1978 (3ª edition).
