= Libri lintei =

Books written on linen in ancient Rome

The libri lintei, also known as the linen rolls, were a collection of books in ancient Rome written on linen, a technique attributed to the Etruscans.

The Roman Linen Rolls have not survived to recent times. They are known primarily from references to them in the writings of Roman authors, who refer to the Linen Rolls as sources for their writings about history or mythology. A single Etruscan Liber Linteus did survive, because it had been used as a mummy wrapping.

The Linen Rolls were records which, according to one recent theory, originated from notes jotted by officials on their linen clothing, allegedly contained antique lists of annual state officials, and perhaps included records about other matters also. The mysterious Linen Books, stated to have been preserved in the temple of Juno Moneta, need not be dismissed as sheer forgeries fabricated by Gaius Licinius Macer. Yet it is not very likely that they went back to the fourth century BC, as he believed they did; they may not have been more than a hundred years old.

The Linen Books were also used, with less confidence, by another historian, Quintus Aelius Tubero, who likewise wrote about myths.
