= Quintus Aelius Tubero (historian) =

Roman jurist, statesman and author

Quintus Aelius Tubero (fl. mid-1st century BC) was a Roman jurist and historian.

== Biography ==
=== Early life ===
Quintus is presumed to have been the son of Lucius Aelius Tubero and Visellia, the daughter of a Helvia and Gaius Aculeo, and a maternal cousin of the orator Cicero.

=== Career ===
He fought for Pompey at the Battle of Pharsalus in 48 BC but was subsequently pardoned by Julius Caesar. In 46 BC, Tubero unsuccessfully attempted to prosecute one of Caesar's opponents, Quintus Ligarius, whose defence was undertaken by Cicero. This prompted him to abandon his public career, and he went on to study law under Aulus Ofilius.

Tubero authored several works on law, as well as an annalistic history of Rome in at least 14 books, covering the period from the city's foundation to his own day. He is known to have used the libri lintei (linen books or rolls) as a source, and the historian Livy cites him as a reference.

=== Family ===
Tubero married a daughter of the jurist Servius Sulpicius Rufus, and was father to Quintus Aelius Tubero and Sextus Aelius Catus, consuls in 11 BC and AD 4 respectively. He also had a daughter whose son was the jurist Gaius Cassius Longinus, consul in AD 30.

== Sources ==
- Dictionary of Greek and Roman Biography and Mythology, "Tubero, Aelius"
- Klebs, Elimar (1893), "Aelius 156", Realencyclopädie der classischen Altertumswissenschaft (RE, PW), volume 1, part 1, columns 537–538.
- Oxford Classical Dictionary, "Aelius Tubero, Quintus"
