= Lucius Aelius Tubero =

Lucius Aelius Tubero was a 1st-century BC Roman politician and writer of the gens Aelia; a friend of Cicero, he was the father of historian and jurist Quintus Aelius Tubero. He was married to Cicero's cousin Visellia.
