= Roman Imperial Coinage =

British catalogue of Roman Imperial currency

Roman Imperial Coinage, abbreviated RIC, is a British catalogue of Roman Imperial currency, from the time of the Battle of Actium (31 BC) to Late Antiquity in 491 AD. It is the result of many decades of work, from 1923 to 1994, and a successor to the previous 8-volume catalogue compiled by the numismatist Henry Cohen in the 19th century.

It is the standard work for numismatic identification of coinage struck by authorisation of the Roman emperors.

== Production ==
The production of a chronological catalogue of Roman Imperial coinage was started in 1923 by Harold Mattingly, a numismatist at the British Museum, assisted by Edward Allen Sydenham. Their catalogue differed from its predecessor, produced by Henry Cohen in the 19th century. Cohen had classified the coins by emperor, and then alphabetically by the legend (text) on them. Mattingly broke down the classification further into which foundry, and in which series, each coin came from. Mattingly and Sydenham were joined by C. H. V. Sutherland in producing volumes IVb (1938) and IVc (1949), and by Percy H. Webb for volumes Va (1927) and Vb (1933). After 1930, the editorship of each of the final volumes was given to a specialist of the period. After Mattingly's death in 1964, Sutherland and R. A. G. Carson jointly took over editorship of the work.

In 1984, Sutherland published an expanded edition of the first volume of 1923, which was not as detailed as those that followed.

== Contents ==
The RIC comprises 13 volumes:

- volume 1: Augustus–Vitellius (31 BC–69 AD), by H. Mattingly and E. A. Sydenham, London, 1923 (revised by C. H. V. Sutherland and R. A. G. Carson, 1984)
- volume 2: Vespasian–Hadrian (69–138), by Harold Mattingly, Edward Allen Sydenham, London, 1926
- volume 3: Antoninus Pius–Commodus (138–192), by H. Mattingly, E.A. Sydenham, London, 1930
- volume 4a: Pertinax–Geta VII and Caracalla (193–217), by H. Mattingly, E. A. Sydenham, London, 1936
- volume 4b: Macrinus–Pupienus (217–238), by H. Mattingly, E.A. Sydenham, C. H. V. Sutherland, London, 1938
- volume 4c: Gordian III–Uranius Antoninus (238–253), by H. Mattingly, E. A. Sydenham, C.H.V. Sutherland, London, 1949
- volume 5a: Valerian–Florian (253–276), by Percy H. Webb, London, 1927
- volume 5b: Marcus Aurelius Probus–Maximian (276–310), by Percy H. Webb, London, 1933
- volume 6: The Diocletian Reform–Maximinus II (294–313), by C. H. V. Sutherland, London, 1967
- volume 7: Constantine I–Licinius (313–337), by P. M. Bruun, London, 1966
- volume 8: The Family of Constantine I (337–364), by J. P. C. Kent, London, 1981
- volume 9: Valentinian I–Theodosius I (364–395), by J.W.E. Pearce, London, 1951
- volume 10: The Divided Empire, 395–491, by J. P. C. Kent, London, 1994
  - Western Roman Empire: Flavius Honorius–Romulus Augustus (395–476)
  - Eastern Roman Empire: Flavius Arcadius–Zeno (395–491)

Each emperor is given a detailed history of the coinage of his reign, with a classification of the type of money, and within each type a registration, from its inscription.

For each coin listed, there is a description of both the obverse and reverse sides of the coin ("heads and tails"), and a notation depending on the rarity of known examples:

- C: common
- R1: rare, only twenty or so known
- R2: between five and fifteen known
- R3: four or five known
- R4: two or three known
- R5: only one known, unique

In the endpapers of each volume is a table of the coins that have reproductions.

== See also ==
- Roman currency
- Roman Inscriptions of Britain

== Sources ==
- Zehnacker, Hubert (June 1986). "Où en est le Roman Imperial Coinage ?". Bulletin de l'Association Guillaume Budé (in French). 1 (2): 202–205. doi:10.3406/bude.1986.1299.
