= Temple of Juno Moneta =

Ancient temple in Rome, Italy

Juno Moneta
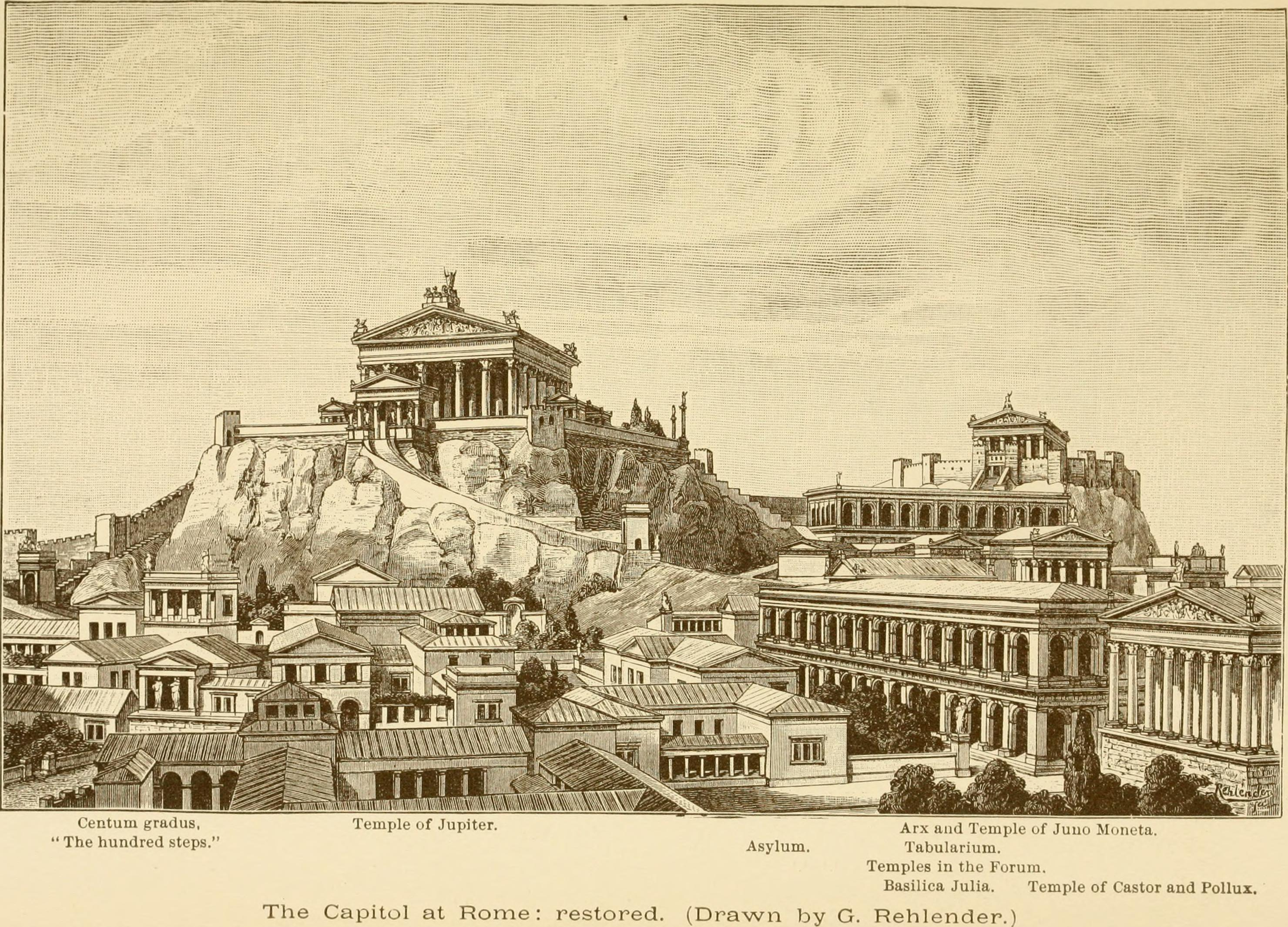
- Drawing of the Capitoline Hill by Georg Rehlender, with the Temple of Juno Moneta at upper right, above the Tabularium.

- Location within Rome
- Interactive map of Juno Moneta
- 41°53′36″N 12°29′1″E
- Type: Temple
- Location: Regione VIII Forum Romanum

History
- Built: 344 BC
- Built by: Lucius Furius Camillus

The Temple of Juno Moneta (Latin: Templum Iunonis Monetæ) was an ancient Roman temple that stood on the Arx or the citadel on the Capitoline Hill overlooking the Roman Forum. Located at the center of the city of Rome, it was next to the place where Roman coins were first minted, and probably stored the metal and coins involved in this process, thereby initiating the ancient practice of associating mints with temples. In addition, it was the place where the books of the magistrates were deposited.

== Etymology ==
Juno Moneta, the second name associating the Roman goddess Juno with the goddess Moneta who was worshiped at some locations outside Rome, was regarded as the protectress of the city's funds. Money was coined in her temple for over four centuries, before the mint was moved to a new location near the Colosseum during the reign of the emperor Domitian. Thus, moneta came to mean "mint" (mint itself being a corruption of moneta) in Latin, which was used in written works of ancient Roman writers such as Ovid, Martial, Juvenal, and Cicero, and was the origin of the English words "monetary" and "money".

Cicero suggests that the name Moneta was derived from the Latin verb monere (to warn) because during an earthquake, a voice from the temple had demanded the expiatory sacrifice of a pregnant sow. The same derivation is implied by the story of the sacred geese of Juno, who warned the Roman commander Marcus Manlius of the approach of the Gauls during a night attack on the Capitoline in 390 BC. As the Roman historian Livy tells the story:

Choosing a night when there was a faint glimmer of light, the Gauls sent an unarmed man in advance to try the road; then handing one another their arms where the path was difficult, and supporting each other or dragging each other up as the ground required, they finally reached the summit. So silent had their movements been that not only were they unnoticed by the sentinels, but they did not even wake the dogs, an animal peculiarly sensitive to nocturnal sounds. But they did not escape the notice of the geese, which were sacred to Juno and had been left untouched in spite of the extremely scanty supply of food. This proved the safety of the garrison, for their clamour and the noise of their wings aroused Marcus Manlius, the distinguished soldier, who had been consul three years before. He snatched up his weapons and ran to call the rest to arms, and while the rest hung back he struck with the boss of his shield a Gaul who had got a foothold on the summit and knocked him down. He fell on those behind and upset them, and Manlius slew others who had laid aside their weapons and were clinging to the rocks with their hands. By this time others had joined him, and they began to dislodge the enemy with volleys of stones and javelins till the whole body fell helplessly down to the bottom.

Most modern scholars reject this etymology, however, because it is clear that Moneta was the name of a goddess who was worshiped in some places outside Rome, and when her worship was transferred to Rome, she was equated with Juno.

Moneta is also a name used for Mnemosyne, mother of the Muses, by Livius Andronicus in his translation of the Odyssey, and Hyginus' citation of Jupiter and Moneta as parents of the muses. The name Mnemosyne or Memory was connected to Juno Moneta who maintained in her temple an unimpeachable record of historical events.

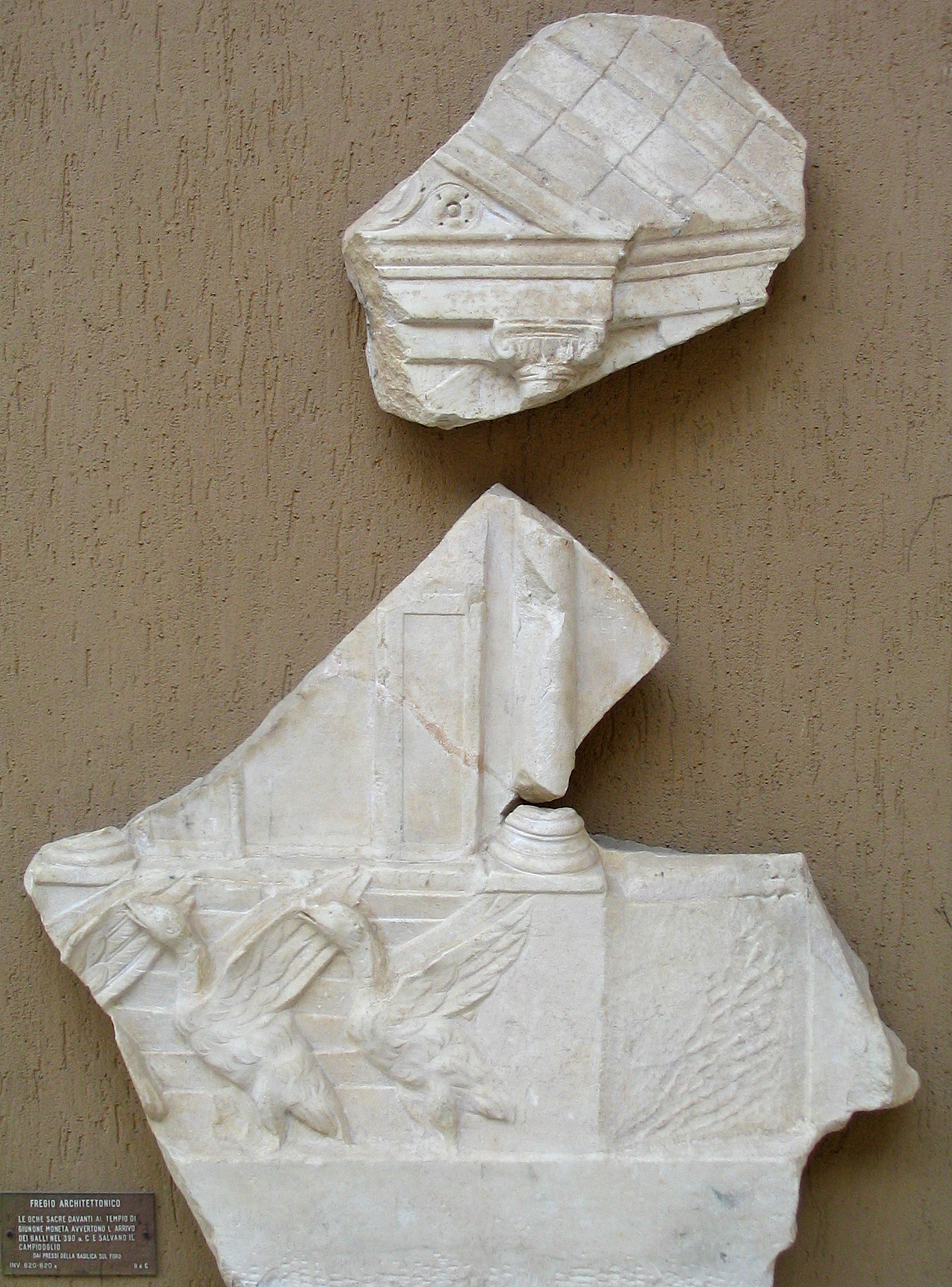
Relief of the sacred geese and the Temple of Juno Moneta, from Ostia

== History ==
According to Livy, in 345 BC, at the beginning of hostilities with the Aurunci, the dictator Lucius Furius Camillus decided to summon the aid of the gods by vowing to build a temple to Juno Moneta. When he returned victorious to Rome, the senate appointed two commissioners to construct the temple on the Arx, on the site of the house of Marcus Manlius, who had repelled the attack of the Gauls a generation earlier. The temple was dedicated one year after the vow. Ovid in the Fasti records the same tradition:

They say that ... the Temple of Juno Moneta (vowed,
Camillus, by you) was dedicated on the summit of the Citadel.
The site was once the home of Manlius, who drove
the armies of Gaul away from Jupiter Capitolinus.

The temple stored the Libri Lintei, the records of annually elected consuls, dating from 444 BC to 428 BC. From 273 BC, Roman silver mint and its workshops were attached to the temple. Moneta's guardianship of Roman coinage encouraged Roman moneyers to use this means as a true record for glorifying their families by commemorating heroic family legends.

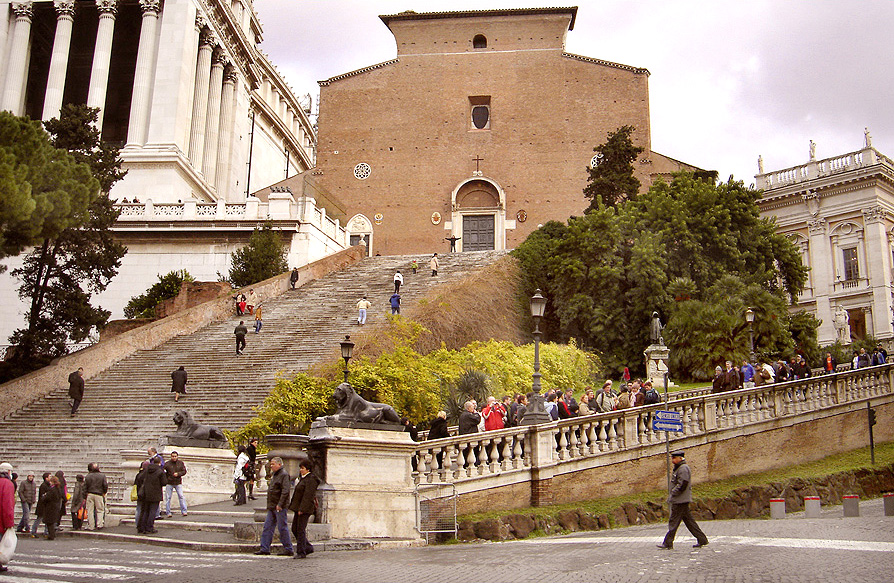
Santa Maria in Aracoeli, some topographers' possible location for the temple of Juno Moneta.

If still in use by the 4th-century, it would have been closed during the persecution of pagans in the late Roman Empire.

According to legend, it was here that the Roman sibyl foretold the coming of Christ to the emperor Augustus, who was granted a heavenly vision of the Virgin Mary standing on an altar holding the Christ child. Augustus supposedly built an altar on the spot – the altar of heaven or ara coeli – and the church of Santa Maria in Aracoeli rose around it. The original structure cannot possibly date back to the time of Augustus (Rome did not become officially Christian until the 4th century), but by the 6th century the existing church was already considered old. It was later rebuilt, with the present structure dating from the 13th century.

== Location ==
Ancient sources agree that the temple was constructed on the Arx, the northern of the two peaks of the Capitoline hill (summa ... in arce, according to Ovid, Fasti 6.183), but no remains of the building have been certainly identified and its precise location has been described as "one of the great enigmas in the topography of ancient Rome". Some scholars believe that it stood on the site now occupied by the church of Santa Maria in Aracoeli, although ancient walls discovered in the cellars beneath the church appear to belong chiefly to shops and houses. Others have argued that the temple was situated in the garden to the southeast of the church, where other walls of tufa and concrete are visible. Although Roman tradition placed the founding of the temple in the 4th century BC, two fragments of Archaic terracotta decoration found in the garden suggest the existence of an earlier building dating to the late 6th or early 5th century, although whether it represents an earlier phase of the temple is unclear.

== See also ==
- List of Ancient Roman temples
- Temple of Jupiter Optimus Maximus
- Capitoline Triad
