= Aequitas =

Roman legal concept

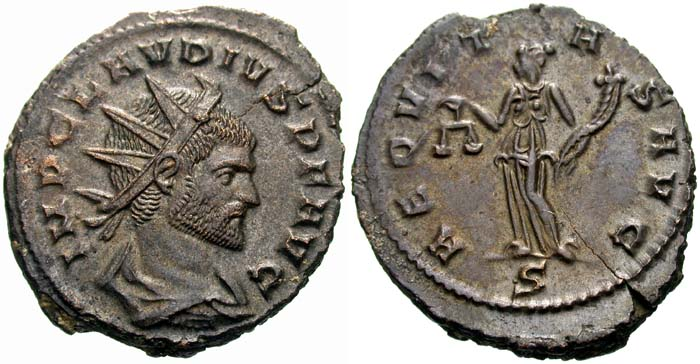
Aequitas on the reverse of this antoninianus struck under Claudius II. The goddess is holding her symbols, the balance and the cornucopia.

Aequitas (genitive aequitatis) is the Latin concept of justice, equality, conformity, symmetry, or fairness. It is the origin of the English word "equity". In ancient Rome, it could refer to either the legal concept of equity, or fairness between individuals.

Cicero defined aequitas as "tripartite": the first, he said, pertained to the gods above (ad superos deos) and is equivalent to pietas, religious obligation; the second, to the Manes, the underworld spirits or spirits of the dead, and was sanctitas, that which is sacred; and the third pertaining to human beings (homines) was iustitia, "justice".

During the Roman Empire, Aequitas as a divine personification was part of the religious propaganda of the emperor, under the name Aequitas Augusti, which also appeared on coins. She is depicted on coins holding a cornucopia and a balance scale (libra), which was more often a symbol of "honest measure" to the Romans than of justice.
