= List of Roman imperial victory titles =

This is a list of victory titles assumed by Roman Emperors, not including assumption of the title Imperator (originally itself a victory title); note that the Roman Emperors were not the only persons to assume victory titles (Maximinus Thrax acquired his victory title during the reign of a previous Emperor). In a sense, the Imperial victory titles give a summary of which wars and which adversaries were considered significant by the senior leadership of the Roman Empire, but in some cases more opportunistic motifs play a role, even to the point of glorifying a victory that was by no means a real triumph (but celebrated as one for internal political prestige).

Multiple grants of the same title were distinguished by ordinals, e.g. Germanicus Maximus IV, "great victor in Germania for the fourth time".

== List ==
- Quintus Labienus, 40-38 BC
  - Parthicus imperator: variously interpreted, with latest research suggest the meaning "friend of Parthia"
- Publius Ventidius Bassus, 38 BC
  - Parthicus, victorious against Parthia (the only non-imperial holder)
- Nero Claudius Drusus
  - Germanicus ("victorious in Germania"), post. 9BC, inherited by:
    - Germanicus, his son
      - Caligula, 37–41, his grandson
    - Claudius, 41–54, his son, on becoming Emperor in 41 AD.
- Claudius, 41–54,
  - Britannicus ("victorious in Britain"), 44
- Vitellius, 69
  - Germanicus ("victorious in Germania"), 69
- Domitian, 81–96
  - Germanicus ("victorious in Germania"), late 83
- Nerva, 96-98
  - Germanicus ("victorious in Germania"), October 97
- Trajan, 98–117
  - Germanicus ("victorious in Germania"), October 97
  - Dacicus ("victorious in Dacia"), 102
  - Parthicus ("victorious in Parthia"), 114
  - Optimus ("Best"), 114
- Marcus Aurelius, 161–180
  - Armeniacus ("victorious in Armenia"), 164
  - Medicus ("victorious in Media"), 166
  - Parthicus Maximus ("great victor in Parthia"), 166
  - Germanicus ("victorious in Germania"), 172
  - Sarmaticus ("victorious in Sarmatia"), 175
- Lucius Verus, 161–169
  - Armeniacus ("victorious in Armenia"), 164
  - Parthicus Maximus ("great victor in Parthia"), 165
  - Medicus ("victorious in Media"), 166
- Commodus, 177–192
  - Germanicus ("victorious in Germania"), 15 October 172
  - Sarmaticus ("victorious in Sarmatia"), spring 175
  - Germanicus Maximus ("great victor in Germania"), mid-182
  - Britannicus, late 184
- Septimius Severus, 193–211
  - Arabicus ("victorious in Arabia"), 195
  - Adiabenicus (victor of Adiabene"), 195
  - Parthicus Maximus ("great victor in Parthia"), 198
  - Britannicus Maximus ("great victor in Britain"), 209 or 210
- Caracalla, 198–217
  - Britannicus Maximus ("great victor in Britain"), 209 or 210
  - Germanicus Maximus ("great victor in Germania"), 213
- Maximinus Thrax, 235–238
  - Germanicus Maximus ("great victor in Germania"), 235
- Philip the Arab
  - Germanicus Maximus ("great victor in Germania"), ca 247
  - Carpicus Maximus ("great victor of the Carpi") ca 247
- Claudius II, 268–270
  - Gothicus Maximus ("great victor against the Goths"), 269
- Aurelian, 270–275
  - Germanicus Maximus ("great victor in Germania"), 270 and 271
  - Gothicus Maximus ("great victor of the Goths"), 271
  - Parthicus Maximus ("great victor in Parthia"), 273
- Tacitus, 275–276
  - Gothicus Maximus ("great victor of the Goths"), 276
- Probus, 276–282
  - Gothicus (victor of the Goths"), 277
  - Germanicus Maximus ("great victor in Germania"), 279
  - Persicus Maximus ("great victor in Persia"), 279
- Diocletian, 284–305
  - Germanicus Maximus ("great victor in Germania"), 285, 287, 288, 293 and 301
  - Sarmaticus Maximus ("great victor of the Sarmatians"), 285, 289, 294 and 300
  - Persicus Maximus ("great victor over the Persians"), 295 and 298
  - Britannicus Maximus ("great victor in Britain"), 297
  - Carpicus Maximus ("great victor over Carpians"), 297
  - Armenicus Maximus ("victorious in Armenia"), 298
  - Medicus Maximus ("great victor in Media"), 298
  - Adiabenicus Maximus ("great victor in Adiabene"), 298
- Maximian, 286–305, 306–308
  - Germanicus Maximus ("great victor in Germania"), 287, 288, 293 and 301
  - Sarmaticus Maximus ("great victor of the Sarmatians"), 289, 294 and 300
  - Persicus Maximus ("great victor over the Persians"), 298
  - Britannicus Maximus ("great victor in Britain"), 297
  - Carpicus Maximus ("great victor over Carpians"), 297
  - Armenicus Maximus ("victorious in Armenia"), 298
  - Medicus Maximus ("great victor in Media"), 298
  - Adiabenicus Maximus ("great victor in Adiabene"), 298
- Galerius Maximianus, 305–311
  - Britannicus Maximus ("great victory in Britain"), 297
  - Carpicus Maximus ("great victor of the Carpians"), six times between 297 and 308
- Constantine I, 307–337
  - Germanicus Maximus ("great victor in Germania"), 307, 308, 314 and 328
  - Sarmaticus Maximus ("great victor over the Sarmatians"), 323 and 334
  - Gothicus Maximus ("great victor over the Goths"), 328 and 332
  - Dacicus Maximus ("great victor over the Dacian"), 336
- Constans, 337–350
  - Sarmaticus ("victorious over the Sarmatians")
- Valentinian III, 425-455
  - Germanicus ("victorious over the Germans")
  - Alamannicus ("victorious over the Alamanni")
  - Sarmaticus ("victorious over the Sarmatians")
- Marcian, 450-457
  - Germanicus ("victorious over the Germans")
  - Sarmaticus ("victorious over the Sarmatians")
  - Alamannicus ("victorious over the Alamanni")
  - Francicus ("victorious over the Franks")
- Anastasius I, 491-518
  - Germanicus ("victorious over the Germans")
  - Alamannicus ("victorious over the Alamanni")
  - Francicus ("victorious over the Franks")
  - Sarmaticus ("victorious over the Sarmatians")
- Justinian I, 527–565
  - Alamannicus ("victorious over the Alamanni"), on accession
  - Gothicus ("victorious over the Goths"), on accession
  - Francicus ("victorious over the Franks"), on accession
  - Anticus ("victorious over the Antae"), on accession
  - Alanicus ("victorious over the Alans"), on accession
  - Vandalicus ("victorious over the Vandals"), after the Vandalic War, 534
  - Africanus ("victorious in Africa"), after the Vandalic War, 534
- Justin II, 565-578
  - Alamannicus ("victorious over the Alamanni")
  - Gothicus ("victorious over the Goths")
  - Francicus ("victorious over the Franks")
  - Germanicus ("victorious over the Germans")
  - Anticus ("victorious over the Alans")
  - Vandalicus ("victorious over the Vandals")
  - Africanus ("victorious in Africa")
- Tiberius II Constantine, 578–582
  - Alamannicus ("victorious over the Alamanni")
  - Gothicus ("victorious over the Goths")
  - Francicus ("victorious over the Franks")
  - Germanicus ("victorious over the Germans")
  - Alanicus ("victorious over the Alans")
  - Vandalicus ("victorious over the Vandals")
  - Africanus ("victorious over the Africans")
- Maurice, 582–602
  - Alamannicus ("victorious over the Alamanni")
  - Gothicus ("victorious over the Goths")
  - Anticus ("victorious over the Antae")
  - Alanicus ("victorious over the Alans")
  - Wandalicus ("victorious over the Vandals")
  - Erullicus ("victorious over the Heruls")
  - Gypedicus ("victorious over the Gepids")
  - Africus ("victorious over the Africans")
- Heraclius, 610–641, was the last attested emperor to use ethnic victory titles until the tenth century, in 612 he proclaimed himself:
  - Alamannicus ("victorious over the Alamanni")
  - Gothicus ("victorious over the Goths")
  - Francicus ("victorious over the Franks")
  - Germanicus ("victorious over the Germans")
  - Anticus ("victorious over the Antae")
  - Alanicus ("victorious over the Alans")
  - Wandalicus ("victorious over the Vandals")
  - Africanus ("victorious over the Africans")
  - Erullicus ("victorious over the Heruls")
  - Gypedicus ("victorious over the Gepids")
- Basil II, 960–1025
  - Scythicus ("victorious over the "Scythians"), after his campaign in Bulgaria (991-995)
- Manuel I Komnenos, 1143-1180 revived the practice in 1166, with a legal basis for each of these titles:
  - Isauricus ("victorious over the Isaurians")
  - Cilicius ("victorious over the Cilicians")
  - Armenicus ("victorious over the Armenians")
  - Dalmaticus ("victorious over the Dalmatians")
  - Ugricus ("victorious over the Hungarians")
  - Bosniacus ("victorious over the Bosnians")
  - Chorvaticus ("victorious over the Croatians")
  - Lazicus ("victorious over the Lazi")
  - Ibericus ("victorious over the Iberians")
  - Bulgaricus ("victorious over the Bulgars")
  - Serbicus ("victorious over the Serbs")
  - Zikhicus ("victorious over the Zichi")
  - Azaricus ("victorious in Atzara")
  - Gothicus ("victorious over the Goths")
- Alexios III Megas Komnenos, 1349-1390
  - Germanicus ("victorious over the Germans")
  - Alamannicus ("victorious over the Alamanni")
  - Gothicus ("victorious over the Goths")
  - Wandalicus ("victorious over the Vandals")

== See also ==
- List of Roman emperors
