= Ashmolean Museum =

Museum of art and archeology in Oxford

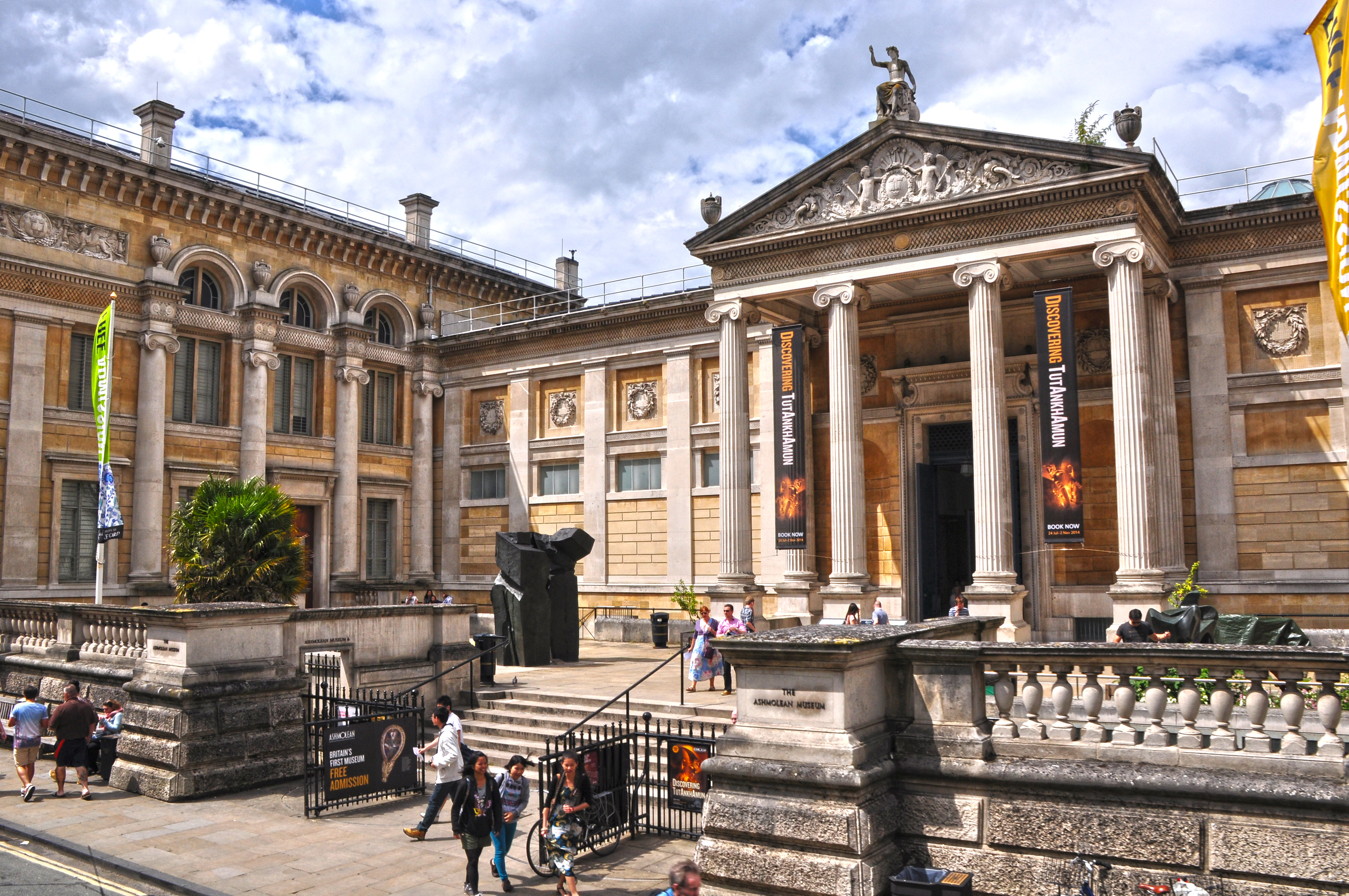
- Front facade of the museum

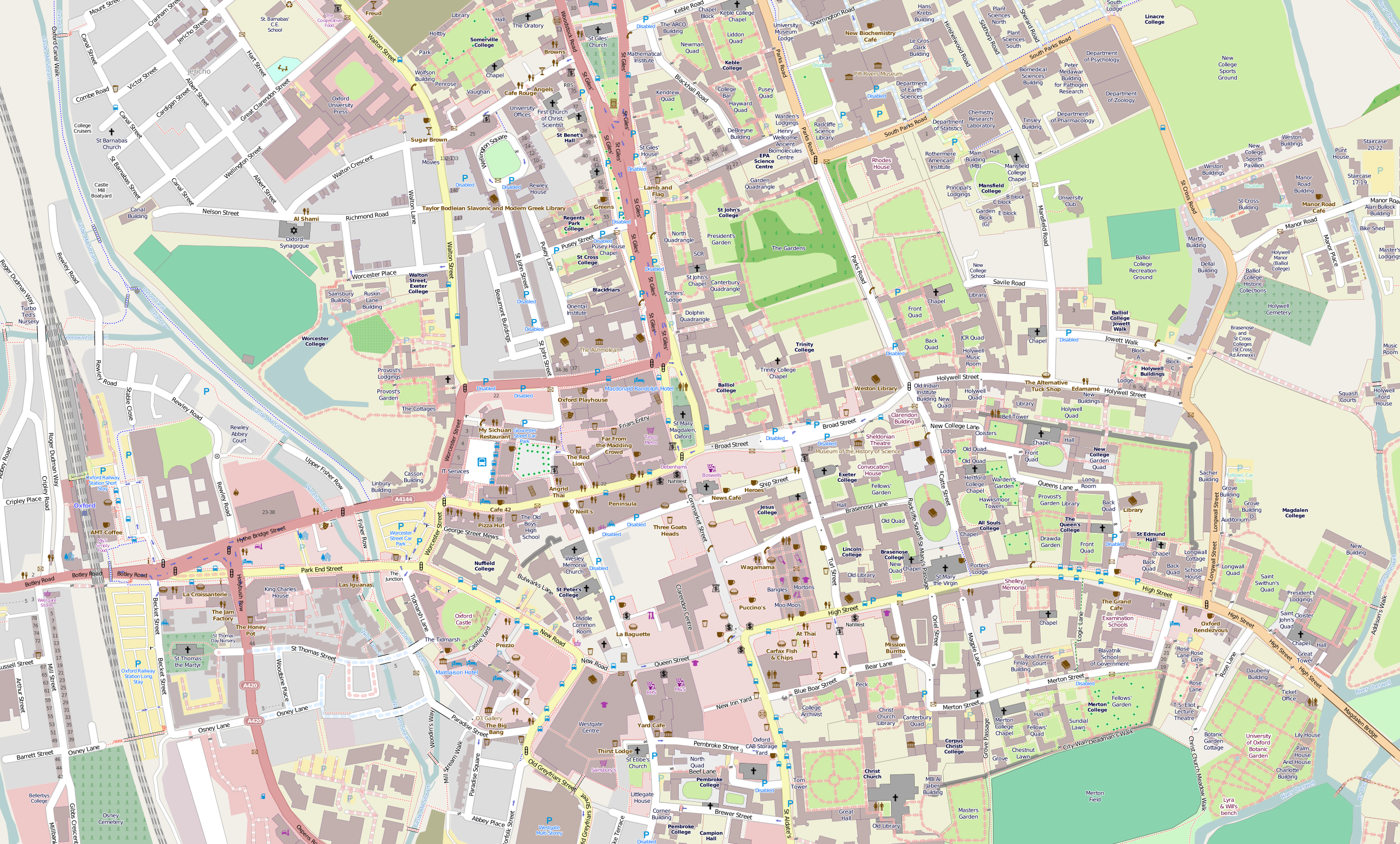
- Location in Oxford
- Established: 1683; 343 years ago
- Location: Beaumont Street, Oxford, England
- Coordinates: 51.7554°N 1.2600°W
- Type: University Museum of Art and Archaeology
- Visitors: 1,072,267 in 2025
- Director: Alexander Sturgis
- Website: www.ashmolean.org

The Ashmolean Museum of Art and Archaeology (/æʃˈmoʊliən, ˌæʃməˈliːən/) on Beaumont Street in Oxford, England, is Britain's first public museum. Its first building was erected in 1678–1683 to house the cabinet of curiosities that Elias Ashmole gave to the University of Oxford in 1677. It is also the world's second university museum, after the establishment of the Kunstmuseum Basel in 1661 by the University of Basel.

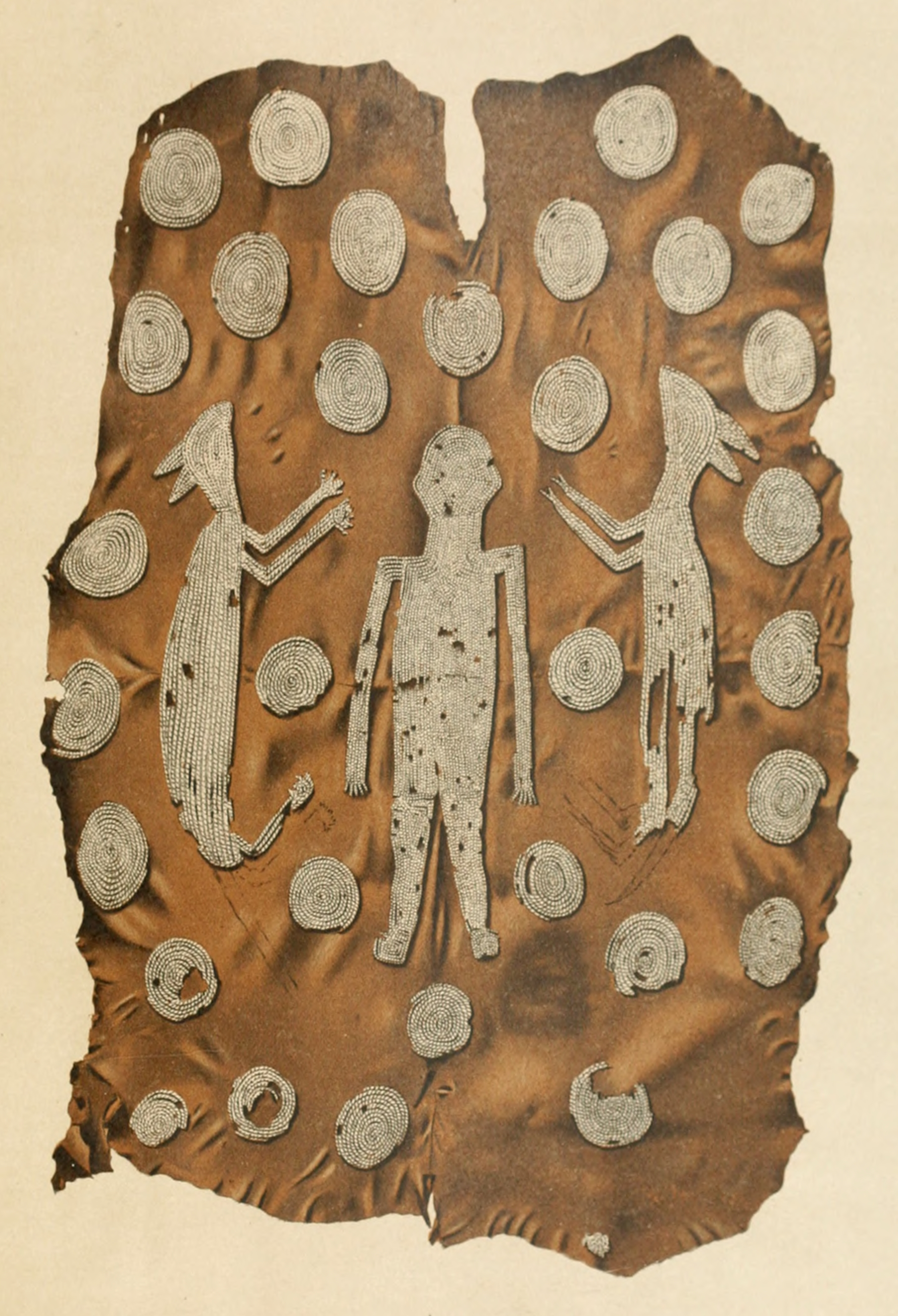
Lithograph of the 17th-century Mantle of Chief Powhatan, in the Ashmole collection

The present building was built between 1841 and 1845. The museum reopened in 2009 after a major redevelopment, and in November 2011, new galleries focusing on Egypt and Nubia were unveiled. In May 2016, the museum redisplayed galleries of 19th-century art.

== History ==
=== Broad Street ===
The museum opened on 24 May 1683, with naturalist Robert Plot as the first keeper. The building on Broad Street (later known as the Old Ashmolean) is sometimes attributed to Sir Christopher Wren or Thomas Wood. Elias Ashmole had acquired the collection from the gardeners, travellers, and collectors John Tradescant the Elder and his son, John Tradescant the Younger. It included antique coins, books, engravings, geological specimens, and zoological specimens—one of which was the stuffed body of the last dodo ever seen in Europe; but by 1755 the stuffed dodo was so moth-eaten that it was destroyed, except for its head and one claw.

=== Beaumont Street ===
The present building dates from 1841 to 1845. It was designed as the University Galleries by Charles Cockerell in a classical style and stands on Beaumont Street. One wing of the building is occupied by the Taylor Institution, the modern languages faculty of the university, standing on the corner of Beaumont Street and St Giles' Street. This wing of the building was also designed by Charles Cockerell, using the Ionic order of Greek architecture.

Sir Arthur Evans, who was appointed keeper in 1884 and retired in 1908, is largely responsible for the current museum. Evans found that the keeper and the vice-chancellor (Benjamin Jowett) had managed to lose half of the Ashmole collection and had converted the original building into the Examination Rooms. Charles Drury Edward Fortnum had offered to donate his personal collection of antiques on condition that the museum was put on a sound footing. A donation of £10,000 from Fortnum (£1.12 million as of 2025) enabled Evans to build an extension to the University Galleries and move the Ashmolean collection there in 1894. In 1908, the Ashmolean and the University Galleries were combined as the Ashmolean Museum of Art and Archaeology. The museum became a depository for some of the important archaeological finds from Evans' excavations in Crete.

After the various specimens had been moved into new museums, the "Old Ashmolean" building was used as office space for the Oxford English Dictionary. Since 1924, the building has been established as the Museum of the History of Science, with exhibitions including the scientific instruments given to Oxford University by Lewis Evans, amongst them the world's largest collection of astrolabes.

Charles Buller Heberden left £1,000 (£42,000 as of 2025) to the university in 1921, which was used for the Coin Room at the museum.

In 2012, the Ashmolean was awarded a grant of $1.1m by the Andrew W. Mellon Foundation to establish the University Engagement Programme or UEP. The programme employs three teaching curators and a programme director to develop the use of the museum's collections in the teaching and research of the university.

=== Renovations ===
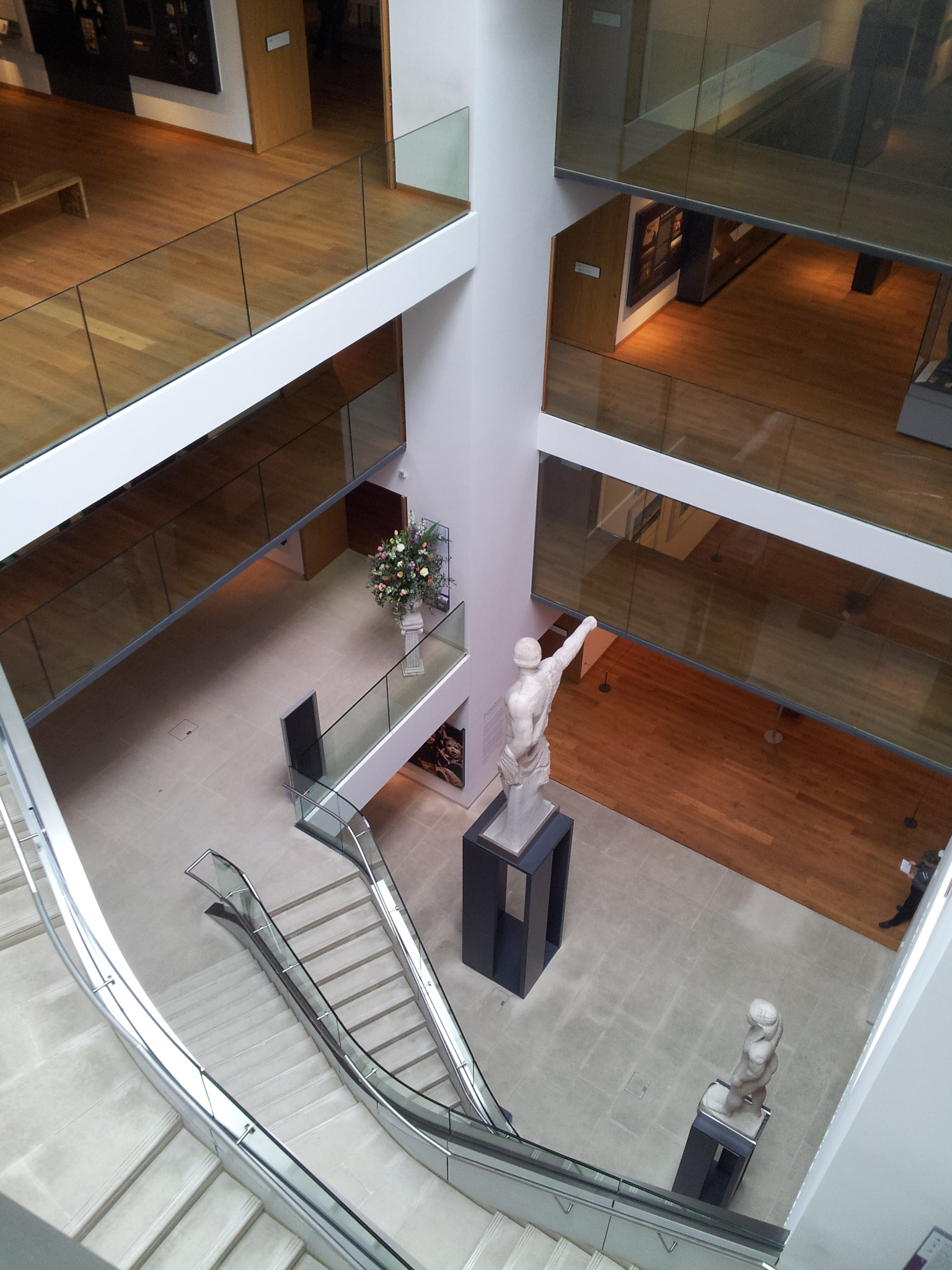
The museum's renovated central atrium in 2009

The interior of the Ashmolean was extensively modernised during the early 21st century and now includes a restaurant and large gift shop.

In 2000, the Chinese Picture Gallery, designed by van Heyningen and Haward Architects, opened at the entrance of the Ashmolean and is partly integrated into the structure. It was inserted into a lightwell in the Grade I listed building and was designed to support future construction from its roof. Apart from the original Cockerell spaces, this gallery was the only part of the museum retained in the rebuilding. The gallery houses the Ashmolean's own collection and is also used from time to time for the display of loan exhibitions and works by contemporary Chinese artists. It is the only museum gallery in Britain devoted to Chinese paintings.

The Bodleian Art, Archaeology and Ancient World Library (formerly the Sackler Library), incorporating the older library collections of the Ashmolean, opened in 2001 and has allowed an expansion of the book collection, which concentrates on classical civilisation, archaeology, and art history.

Between 2006 and 2009, the museum was expanded to the designs of architect Rick Mather and the exhibition design company Metaphor, with narrative masterplanning, interpretation and content development delivered by TGAC, supported by the Heritage Lottery Fund. The $98.2 million rebuilding resulted in five floors instead of three, with a doubling of the display space, as well as new conservation studios and an education centre. The renovated museum re-opened on 7 November 2009.

On 26 November 2011, the Ashmolean opened to the public the new galleries of Ancient Egypt and Nubia. This second phase of major redevelopment now allows the museum to exhibit objects that have been in storage for decades, more than doubling the number of coffins and mummies on display. The project received lead support from Lord Sainsbury's Linbury Trust, along with the Selz Foundation, Mr. Christian Levett, as well as other trusts, foundations, and individuals. Rick Mather Architects led the redesign and display of the four previous Egypt galleries and the extension to the restored Ruskin Gallery, previously occupied by the museum shop, with Alison Grey (TGAC) seconded as Acting Head of Content leading on the interpretation.

In May 2016, the museum opened new galleries dedicated to the display of its collection of Victorian art. This development allowed for the return to the Ashmolean of the Great Bookcase, designed by William Burges, and described as "the most important example of Victorian painted furniture ever made."

== Collections ==
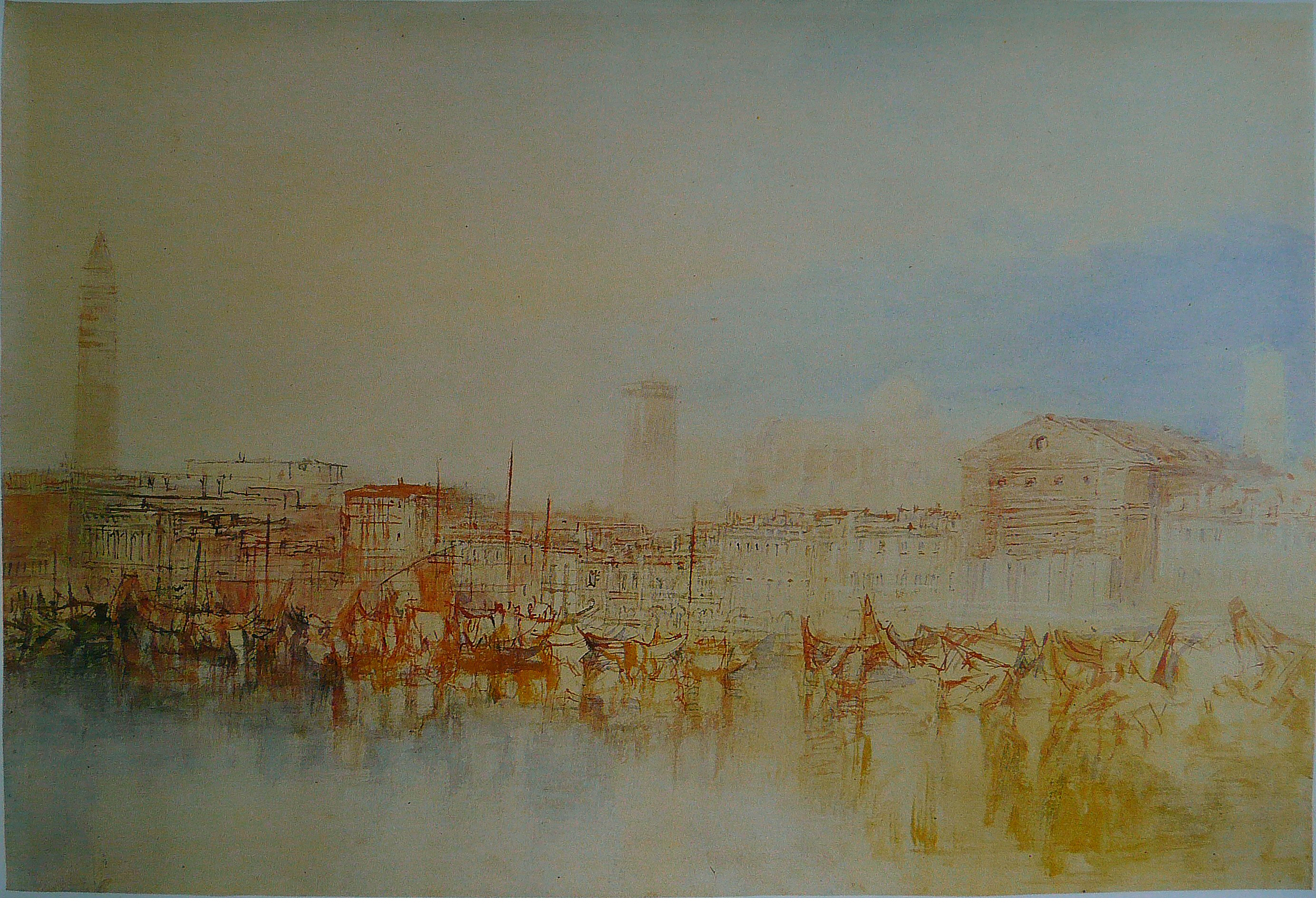
Rive des Esclavons, by J. M. W. Turner, c. 1840

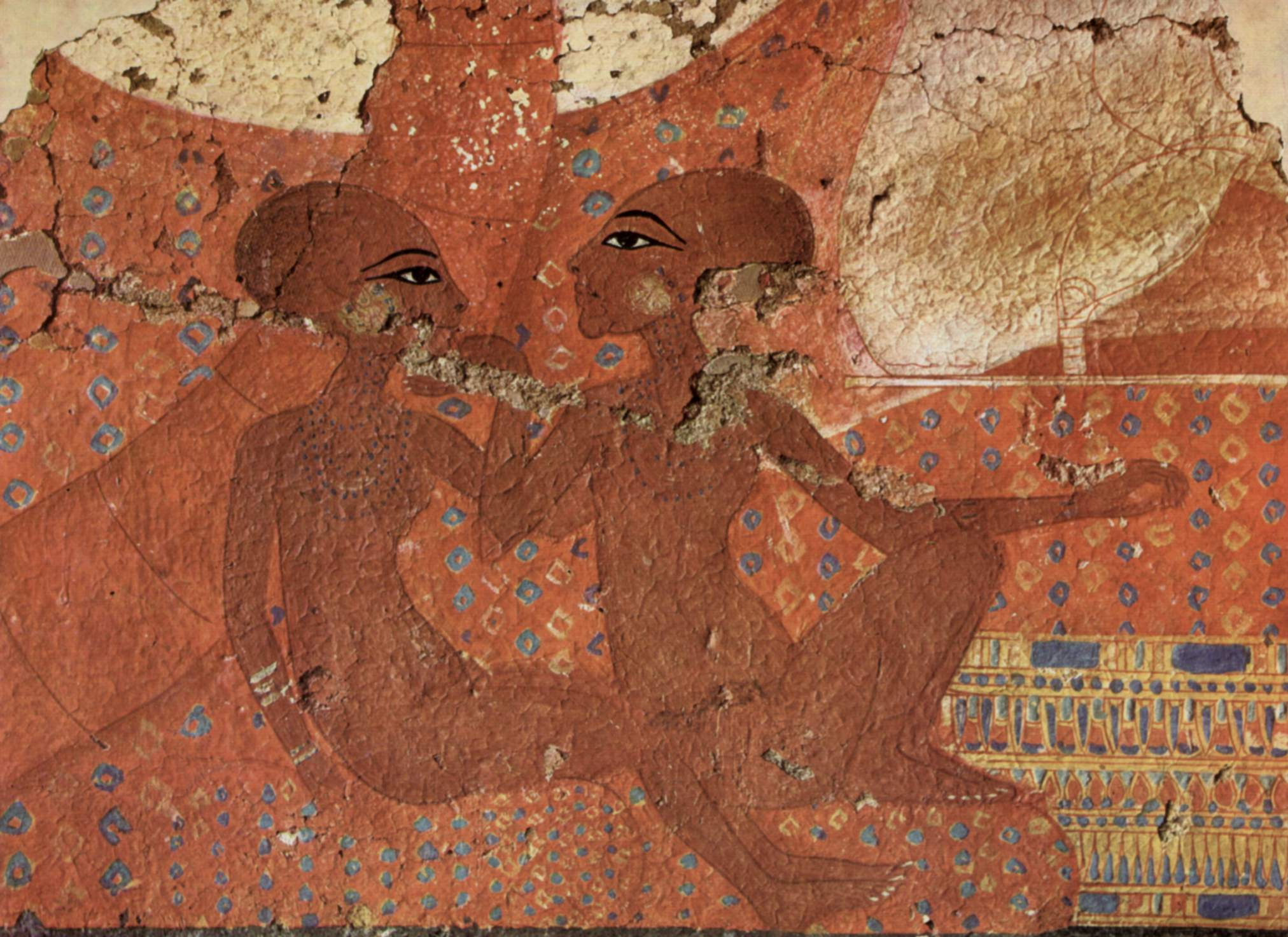
Detail from a fragment of wall painting depicting Akhenaten and Nefertiti with their daughters

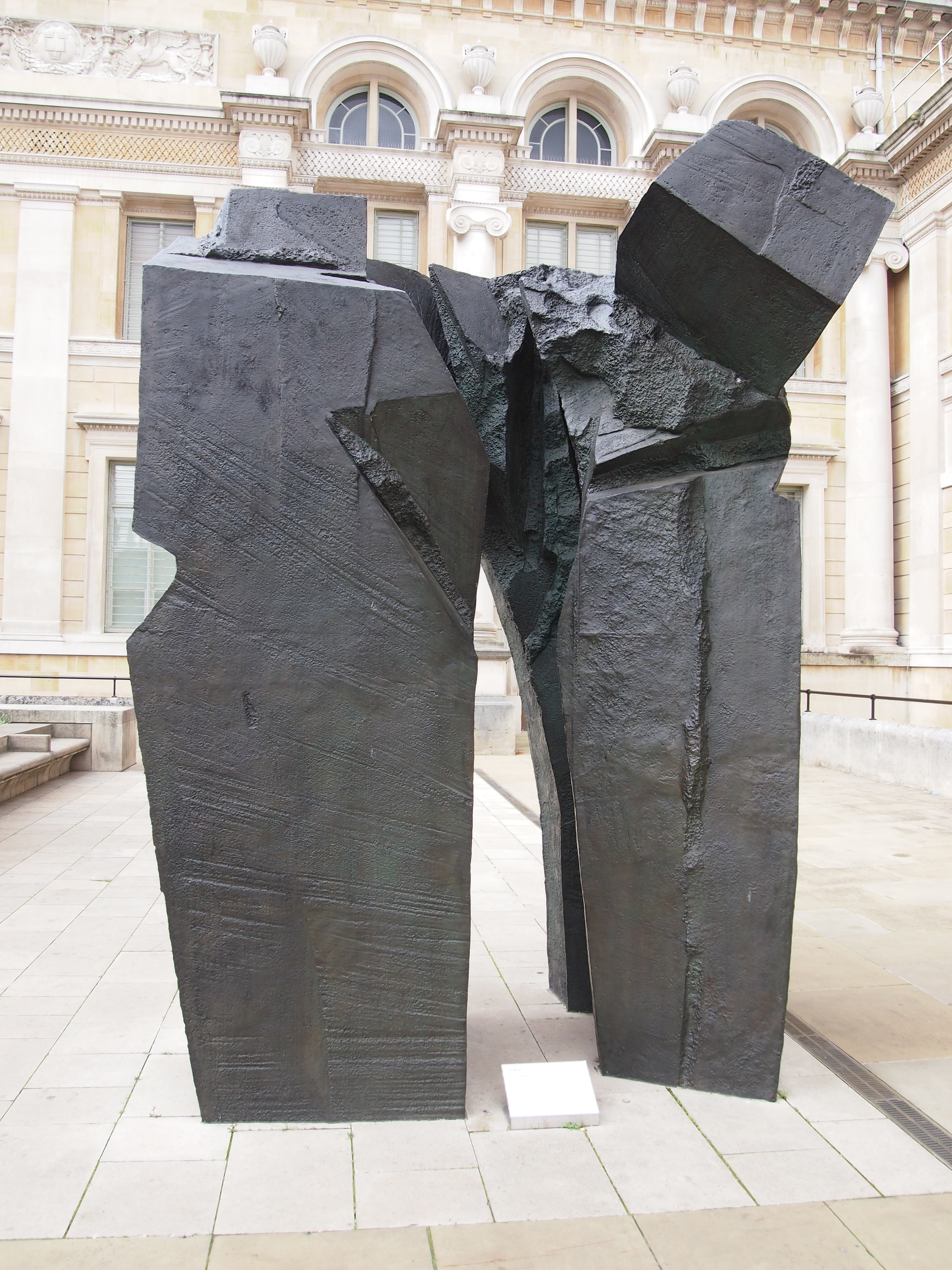
Taichi Arch on the museum's forecourt, a sculpture by the artist Ju Ming

The main museum contains exceptional collections of archaeological specimens and European art. It has among the best collections of Pre-Raphaelite paintings, maiolica pottery, and English silver. The archaeology department includes the bequest of Arthur Evans and so has a large collection of Ancient Greek pottery and Minoan pottery. The department also has an extensive collection of antiquities from Ancient Egypt and the Sudan, and the museum hosts the Griffith Institute for the advancement of Egyptology.

Highlights of the Ashmolean's collection include:

- Drawings by Michelangelo, Raphael and Leonardo da Vinci
- Paintings by Pablo Picasso, Giambattista Pittoni, Paolo Uccello, Anthony van Dyck, Peter Paul Rubens, Paul Cézanne, John Constable, Titian, Claude Lorrain, Samuel Palmer, John Singer Sargent, Piero di Cosimo, William Holman Hunt, and Edward Burne-Jones
- The Alfred Jewel
- Watercolours and paintings by J. M. W. Turner
- The Messiah Stradivarius, a violin made by Antonio Stradivari
- The Daisy Linda Ward bequest in 1939 of 96 still life paintings, including works by Clara Peeters, Adriaen Coorte, and Rachel Ruysch
- The Pissarro Family Archive, donated in the 1950s to the Ashmolean, consisting of paintings, prints, drawings, books, and letters by Camille Pissarro, Lucien Pissarro, Orovida Camille Pissarro, and other members of the Pissarro family
- Arab ceremonial dress owned by Lawrence of Arabia
- A death mask of Oliver Cromwell
- The Crondall hoard, a rare set of Anglo-Saxon gold coins discovered in 1828
- A substantial number of Oxyrhynchus Papyri, including Old and New Testament biblical manuscripts
- Over 30 pieces of Late Roman gold glass roundels from the Catacombs of Rome, the Wilshere Collection is the third largest collection after the Vatican and British Museum.
- A collection of Posie rings.
- An extensive collection of antiquities from Prehistoric Egypt and the succeeding Early Dynastic Period of Egypt
- The Parian Marble, the earliest extant example of a Greek chronological table
- The Metrological Relief, showing Ancient Greek measurements
- The ceremonial cloak of Chief Powhatan
- The lantern that Gunpowder Plot conspirator Guy Fawkes carried in 1605
- The Minoan collection of Arthur Evans, the biggest outside Crete
- The Narmer Macehead and Scorpion Macehead
- The Kish tablets
- The Sumerian Kings List
- Near Eastern (mainly cuneiform) tablets collection, second largest in the UK; mainly recovered by the Oxford-Field Museum Expedition to Kish, Iraq (1923–1933)
- The sole surviving Pococke Kition inscription, used by Jean-Jacques Barthélemy in his decipherment of the Phoenician language
- The Abingdon Sword, an Anglo-Saxon sword found at Abingdon south of Oxford
- The Dalboki hoard of Thracian artefacts, central Bulgaria
- The Scythian antiquities from Nymphaeum, Crimea
- The Shrine of Taharqa

Recent major bequests and acquisitions include:

- In 2024 the museum acquired Fra Angelico's The Crucifixion with the Virgin, Saint John the Evanelist and the Magdalen, from the early 1420s.
- In 2017 the museum acquired a group portrait by William Dobson painted in Oxford around 1645, during the English Civil War. The group in the painting are Prince Rupert, Colonel William Legge (Governor of Oxford) and Colonel John Russell (commander of the prince's elite Blue Coats). The painting was acquired for the nation through the Acceptance in Lieu scheme, administered by Arts Council England.
- In 2017 the museum acquired a Viking hoard that was discovered near Watlington in South Oxfordshire in 2015. It is the first large Viking hoard discovered in Oxfordshire, which once lay on the border of Wessex and Mercia. The hoard contains over 200 Anglo-Saxon coins, including many examples of previously rare coins of Alfred the Great, King of Wessex (871–899) and his less well-known contemporary, King Ceolwulf II of Mercia (874–879).
- In 2015 the Ashmolean raised the money needed to acquire a major painting by J. M. W. Turner. With lead support from the Heritage Lottery Fund, a grant from the Art Fund, and a public appeal, the fundraising target was met to secure Turner's only full-size townscape in oils: The High Street, Oxford (1810). The painting was accepted by the nation through the Acceptance in Lieu scheme.
- In October 2014 the Ashmolean acquired a painting by John Constable titled Willy Lott's House from the Stour (The Valley Farm). The painting was accepted by the nation through the Acceptance in Lieu scheme. The farm building depicted in the painting is also seen from a different angle in The Hay Wain, painted 1821 and now at the National Gallery.
- In October 2014 the Ashmolean acquired a collection of historic English embroideries which was given to the museum by collectors Micheál and Elizabeth Feller. The gift comprises 61 pieces which span the whole of the seventeenth century.
- In late 2013, art historian and collector Michael Sullivan bequeathed his collection of more than 400 works of art to the museum. The collection, which includes paintings by Chinese masters Qi Baishi, Zhang Daqian, and Wu Guanzhong, was considered one of the world's most significant collections of modern Chinese art. The museum has a gallery dedicated to Sullivan and his wife Khoan.
- In 2013 the museum was given the sculpture Taichi Arch by Taiwanese artist Ju Ming, which was installed on the museum's main forecourt. It was given to the museum by the Juming Culture and Education Foundation in memory of art historian and collector Michael Sullivan.
- In 2012 the museum was left a 500-piece collection of gold and silver objets d'art, including many pieces of Renaissance silverware, assembled by the antique dealer Michael Welby.
- In 2012 the museum acquired Édouard Manet's Portrait of Mademoiselle Claus, painted in 1868, after a public campaign to raise £7.83 million while a temporary export bar was placed on it by the RCEWA The campaign received £5.9m from the Heritage Lottery Fund, and a grant of £850,000 from The Art Fund.

== Collections gallery ==
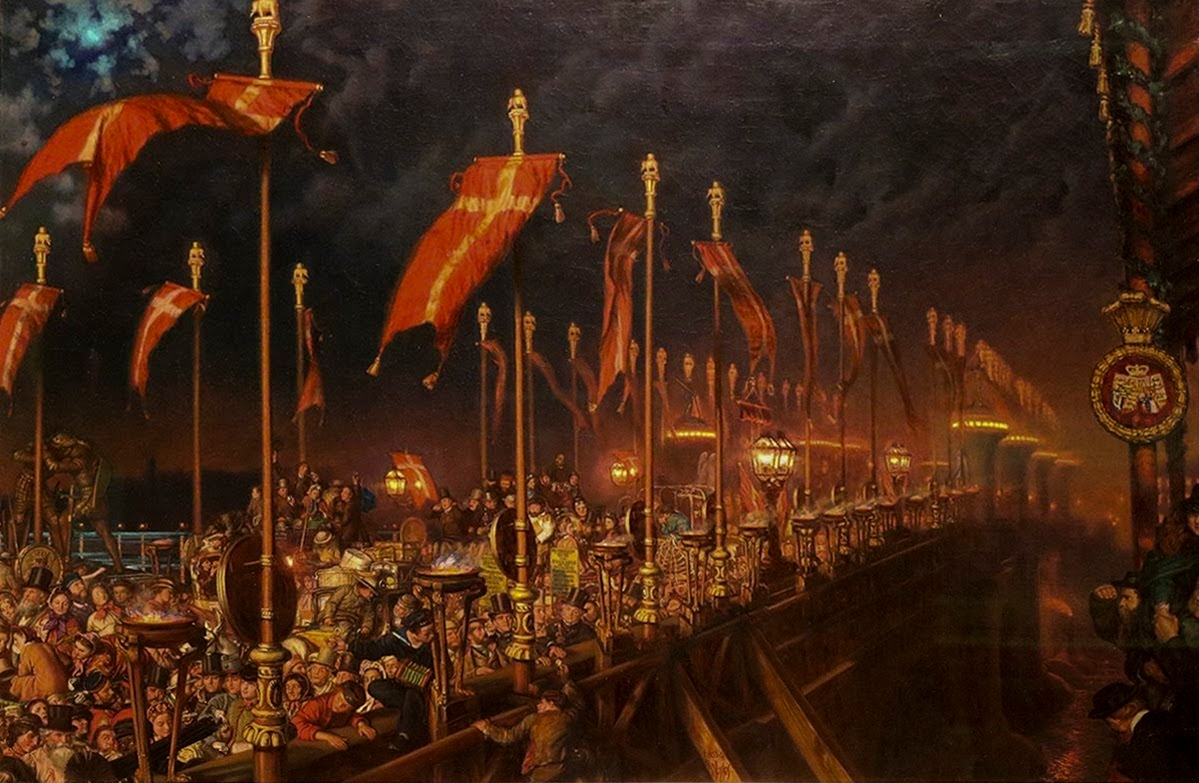
London Bridge on the Night of the Marriage of the Prince and Princess of Wales, 1864 by William Holman Hunt

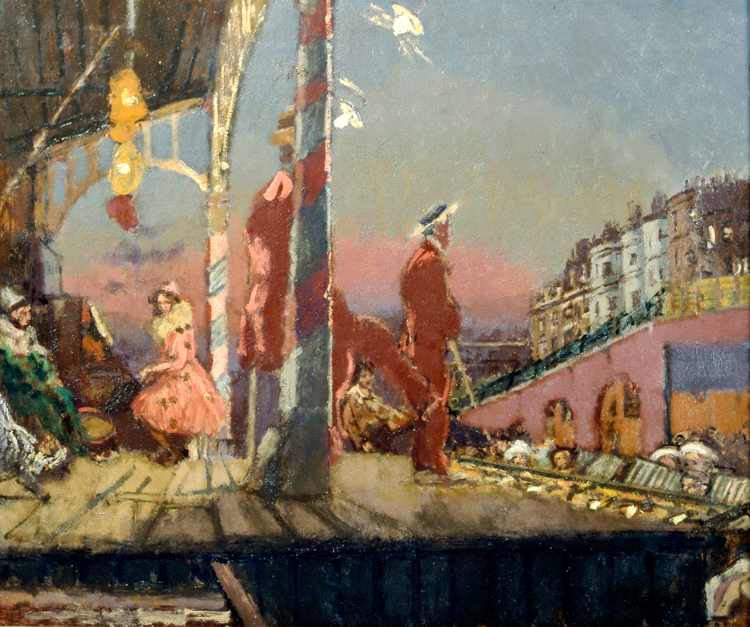
The Brighton Pierrots, 1915, by Walter Sickert

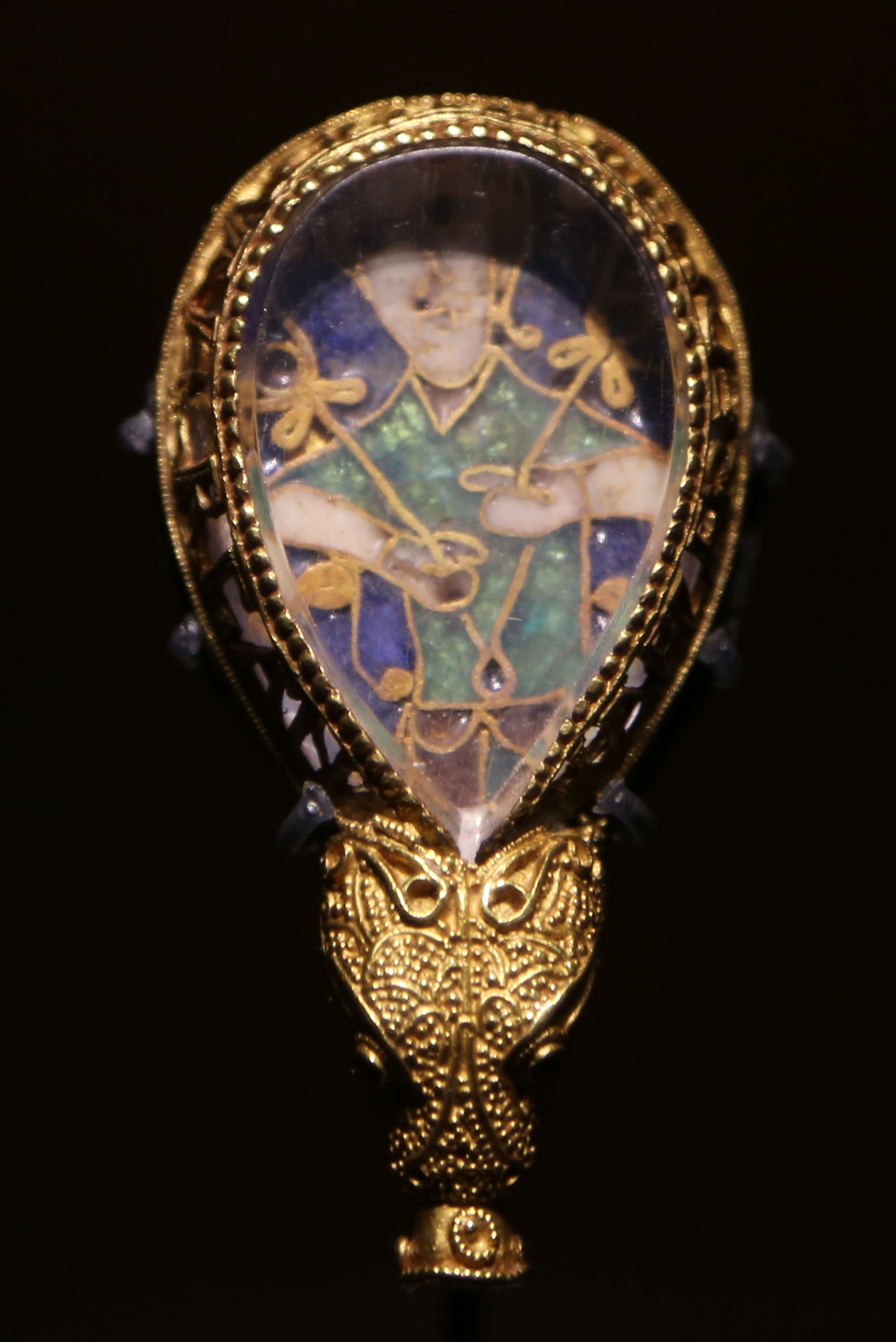
The Alfred Jewel

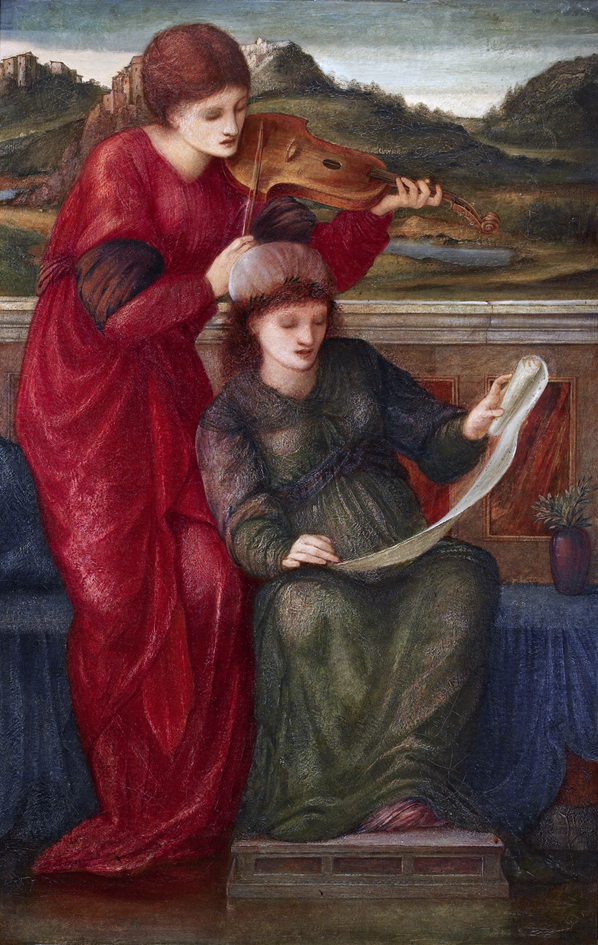
Music, 1877, by Edward Burne-Jones

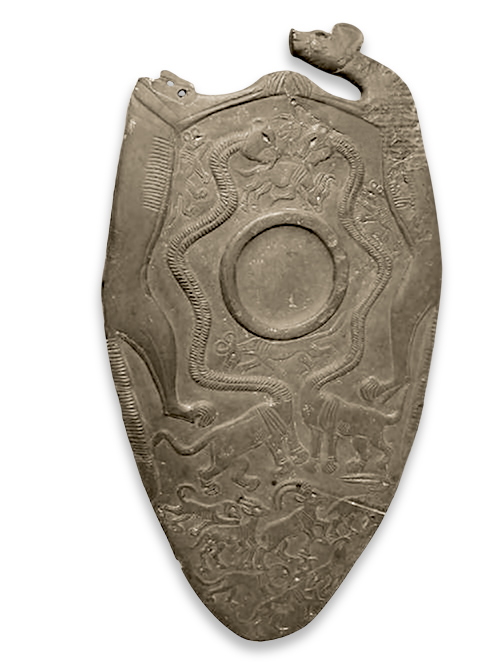
The "Two Dog Palette" from Hierakonpolis

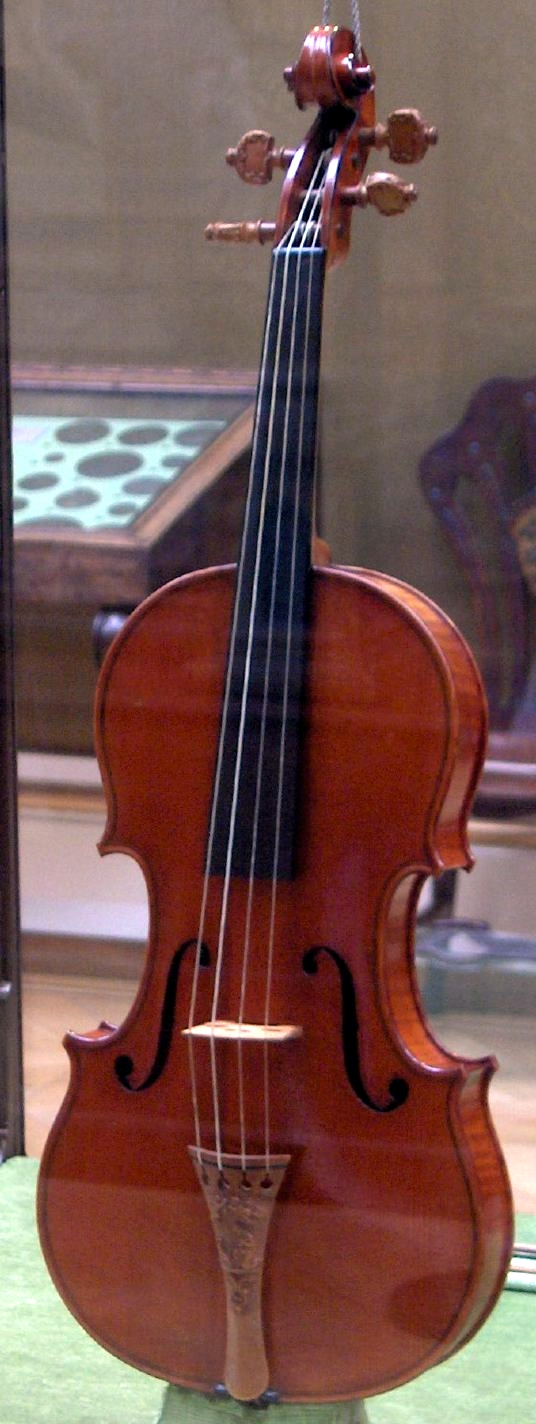
The Messiah Stradivarius violin

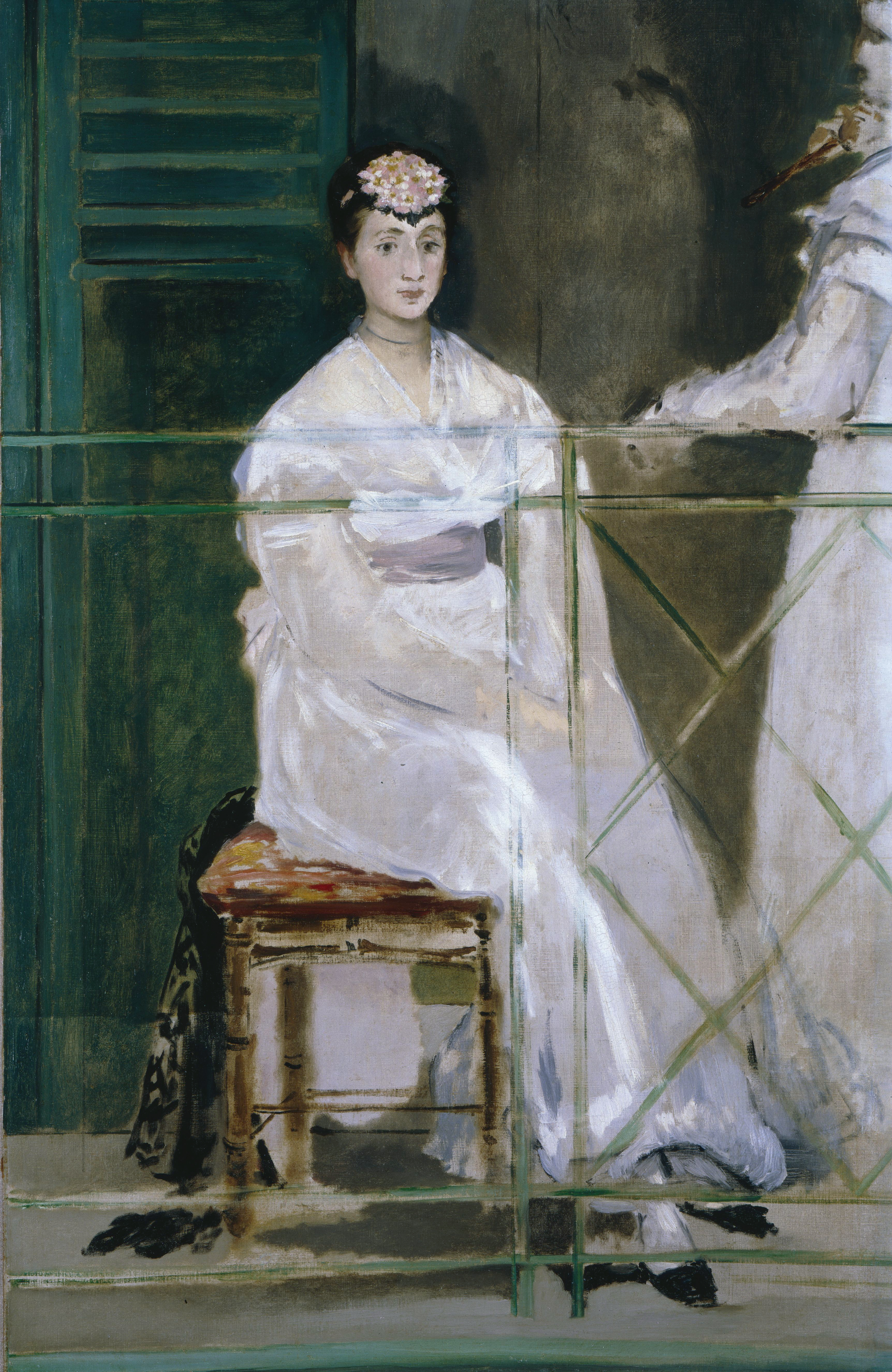
Portrait of Mademoiselle Claus, by Édouard Manet

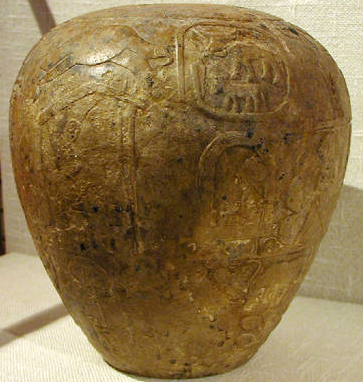
The Narmer Macehead

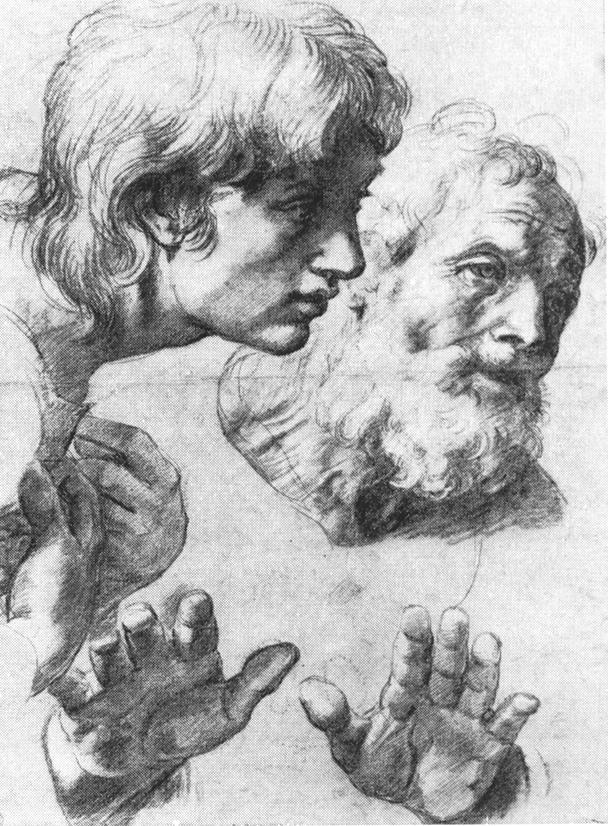
Studies of the Heads of two Apostles and of their Hands, by Raphael

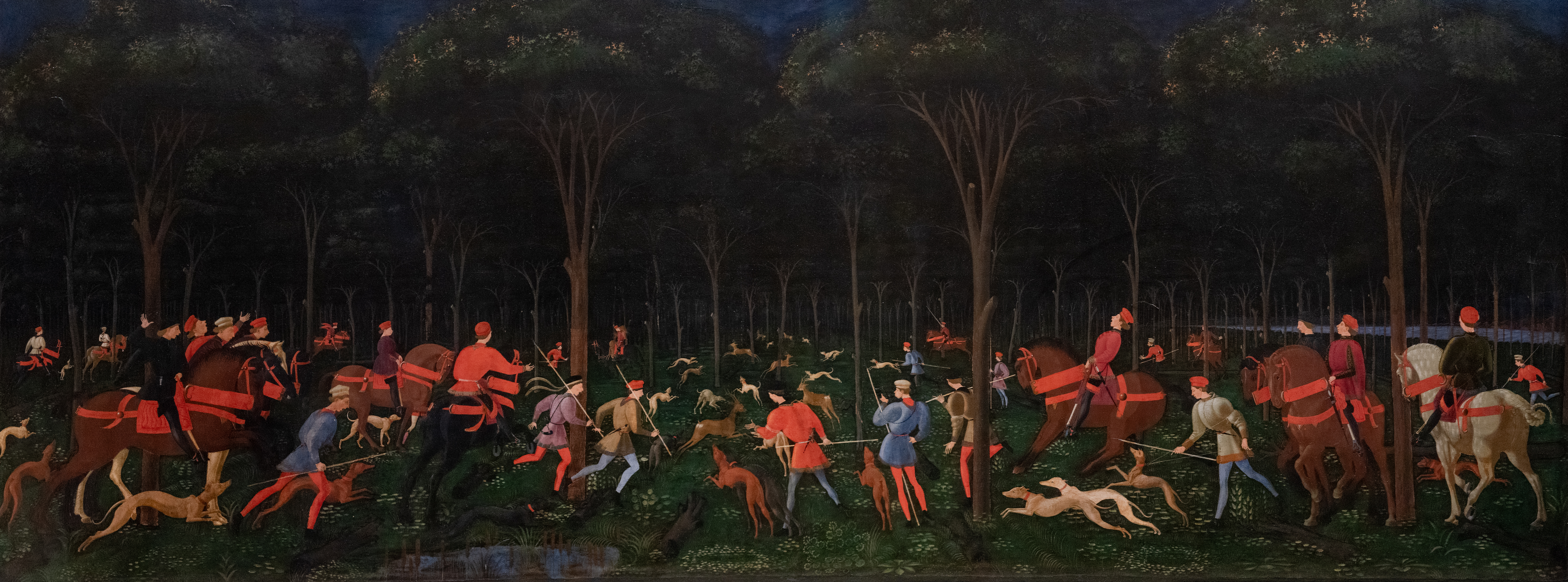
The Hunt in the Forest by Paolo Uccello

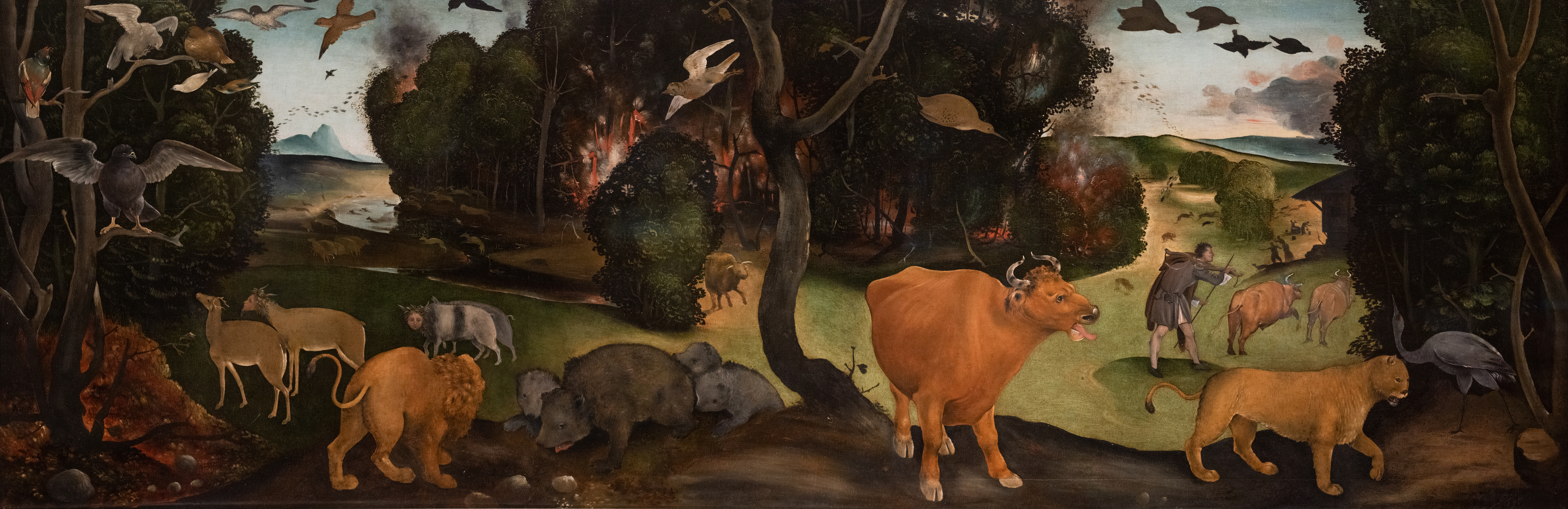
The Forest Fire by Piero di Cosimo

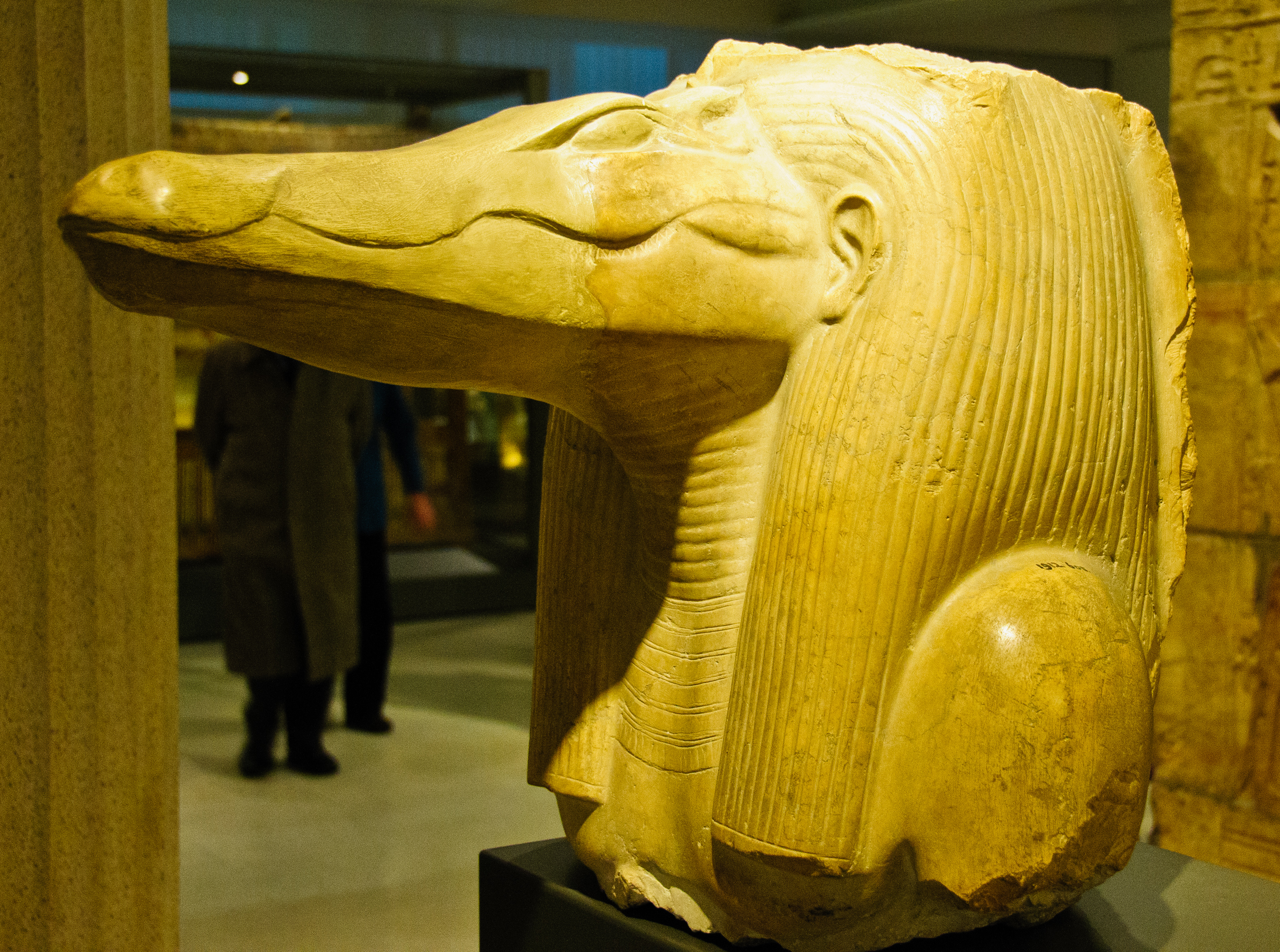
Statue of Sobek, the crocodile god, from the pyramid temple of Amenemhat III

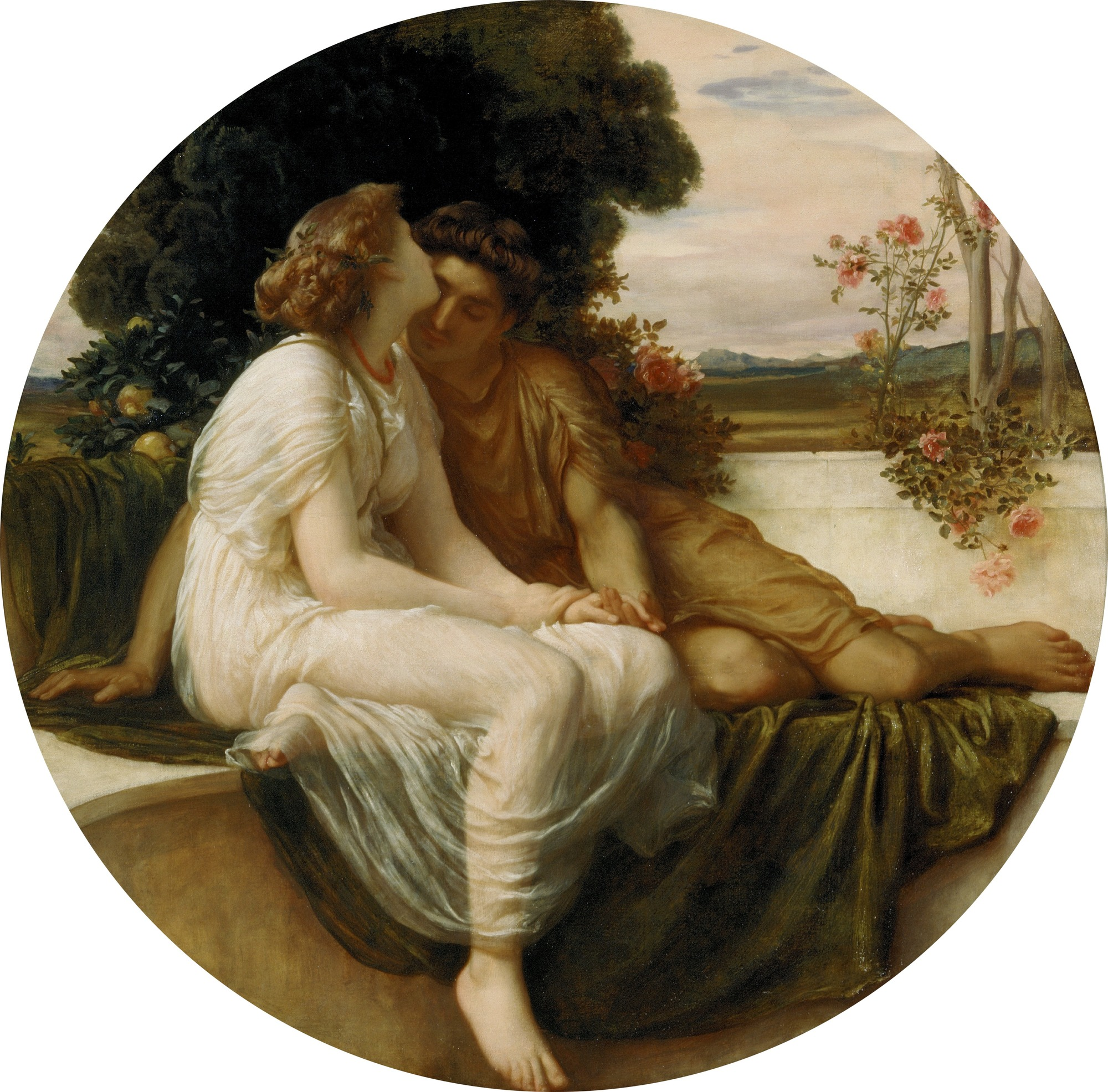
Acme and Septimius, c. 1868, by Frederic Leighton, 1st Baron Leighton

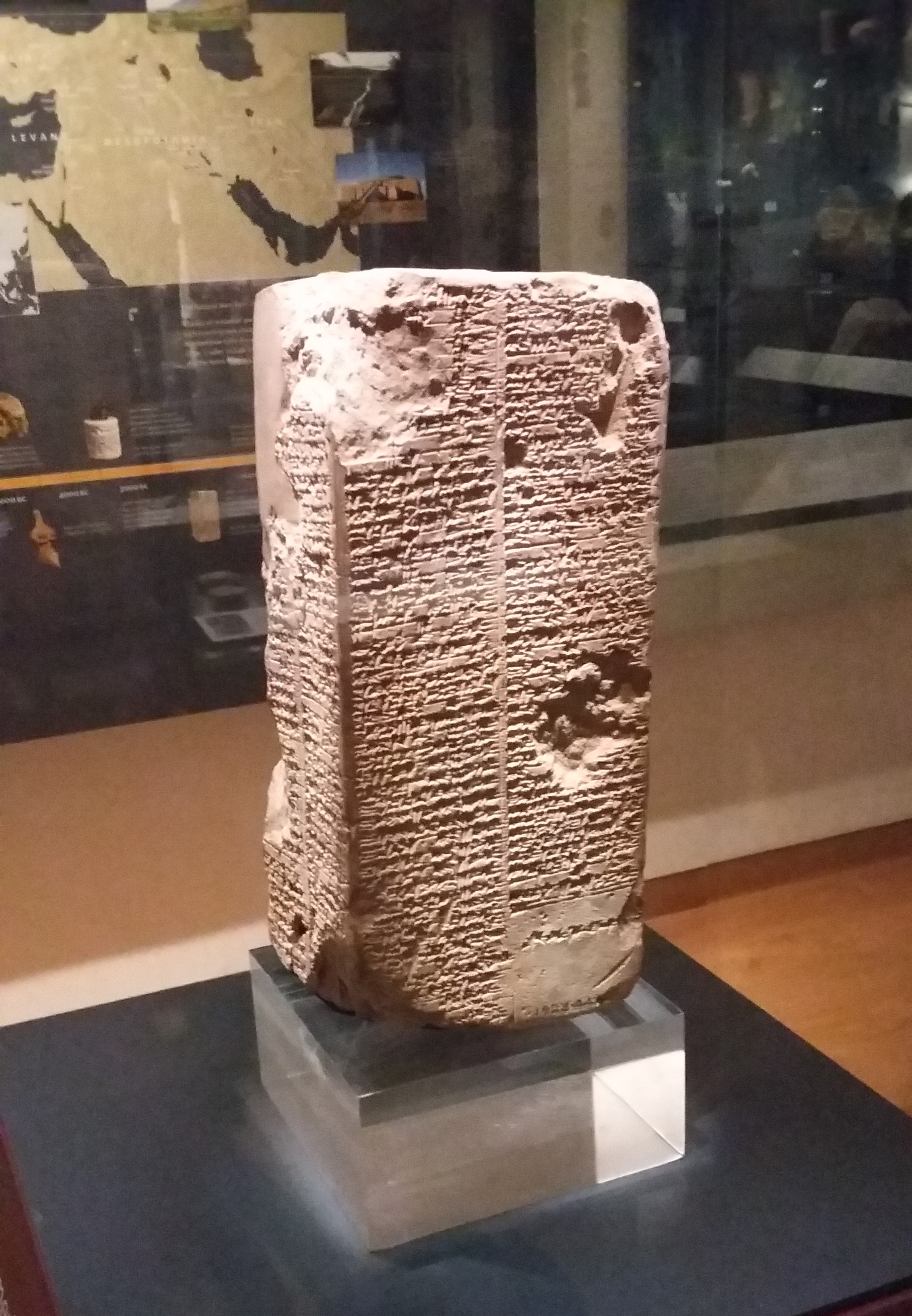
The Sumerian Kings List, dating to approximately 1800 BCE

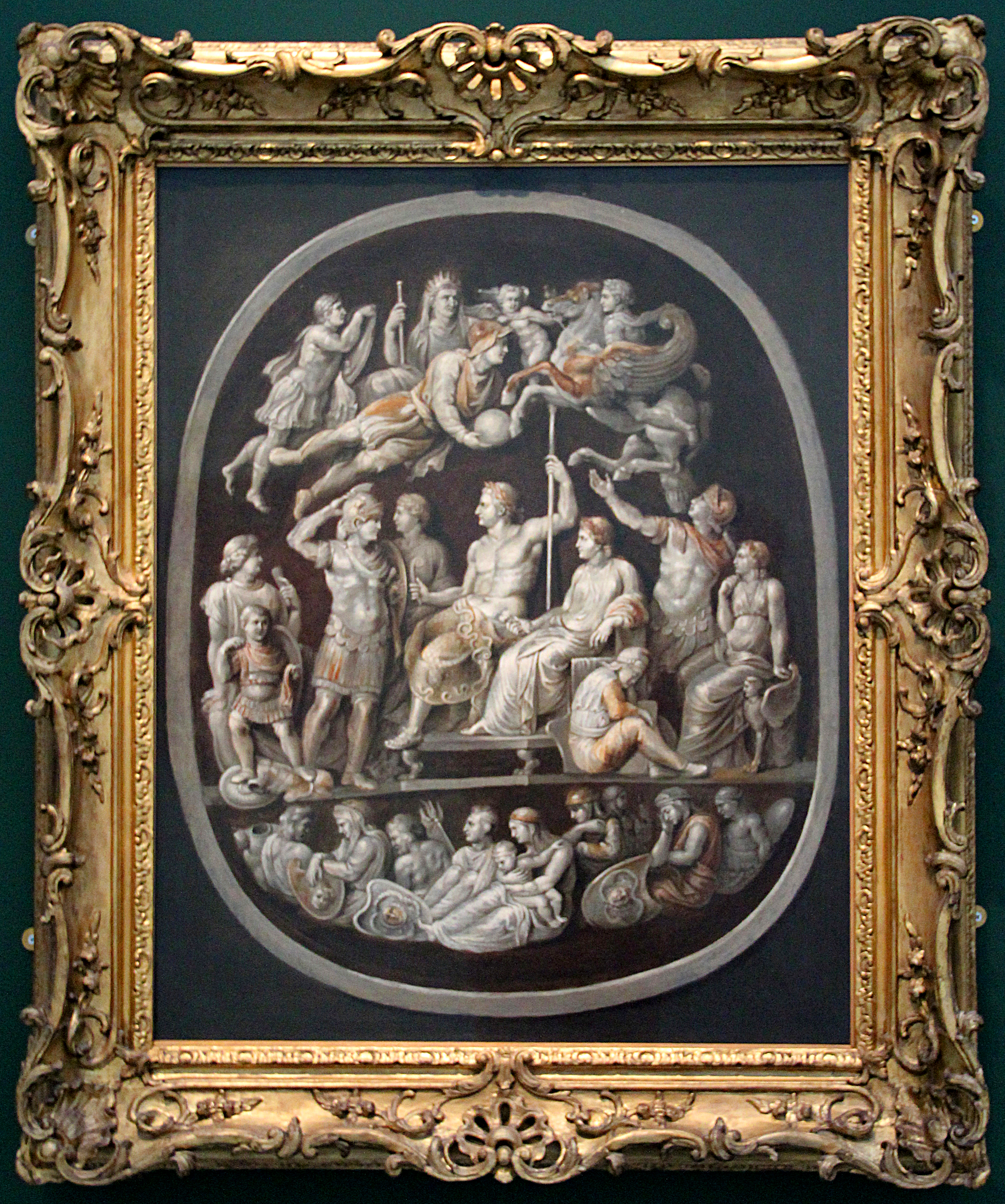
The Apotheosis of Germanicus, a copy after an antique Cameo painted in 1626 by Peter Paul Rubens

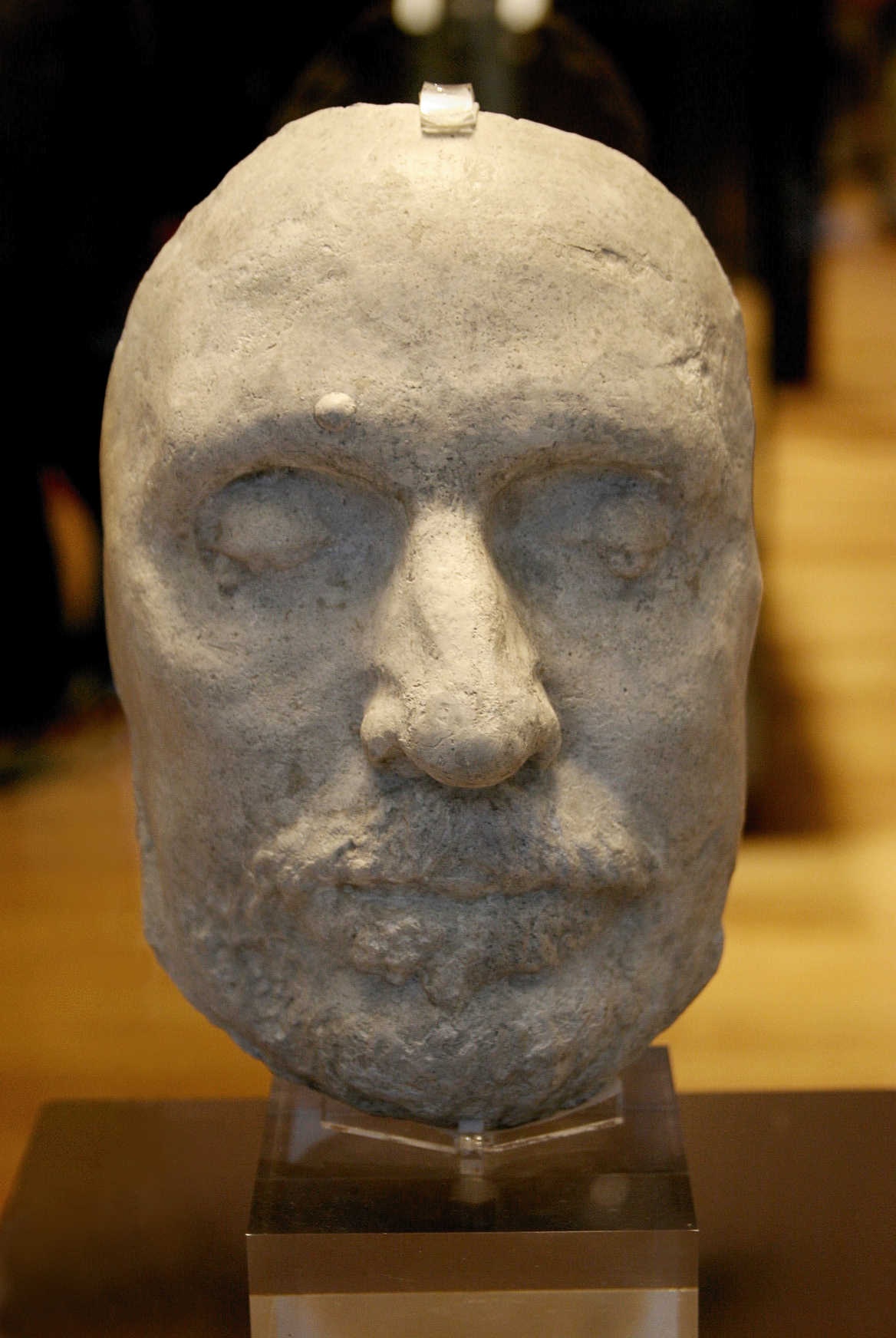
A death mask of Oliver Cromwell

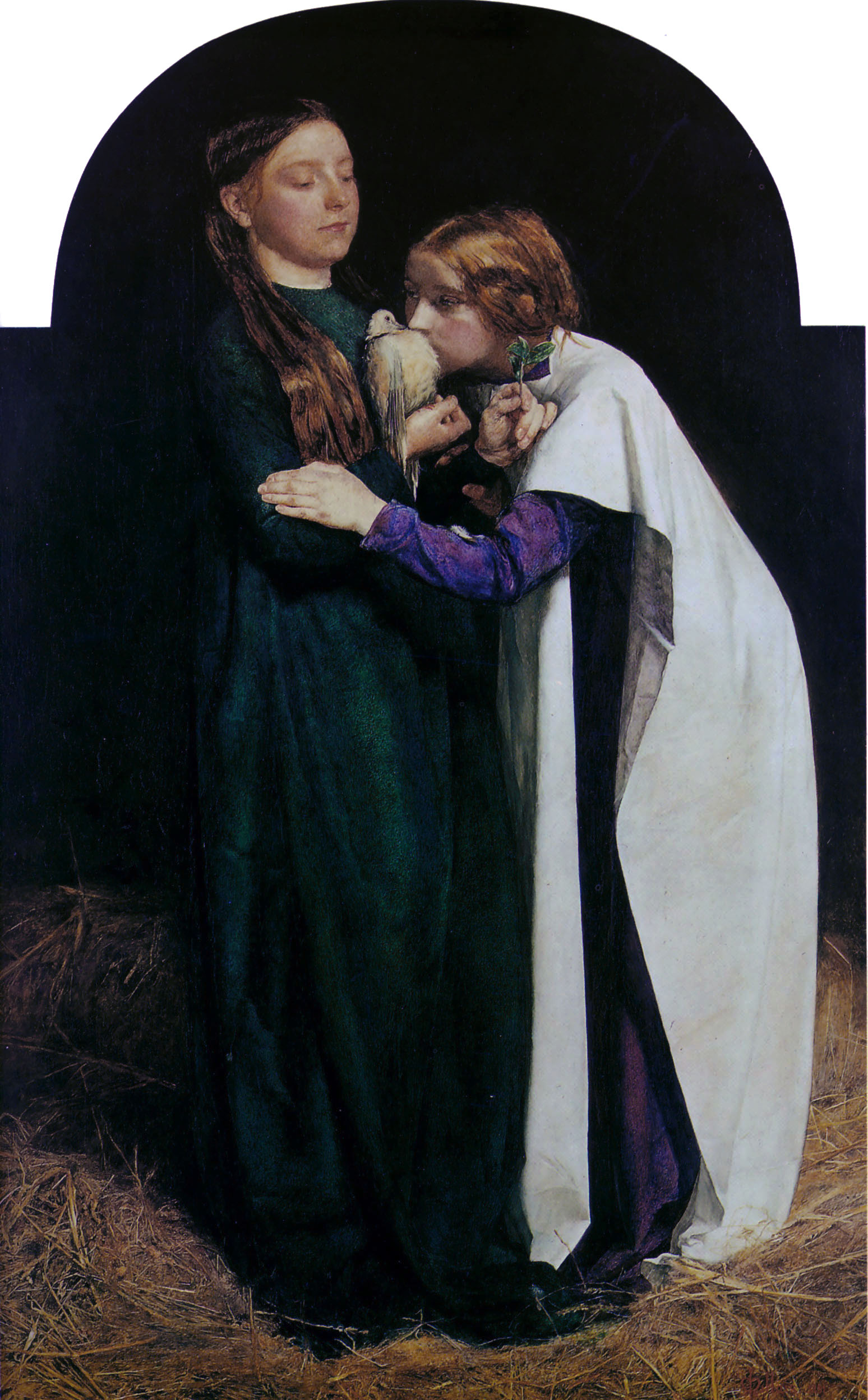
The Return of the Dove to the Ark, 1851, by Sir John Everett Millais

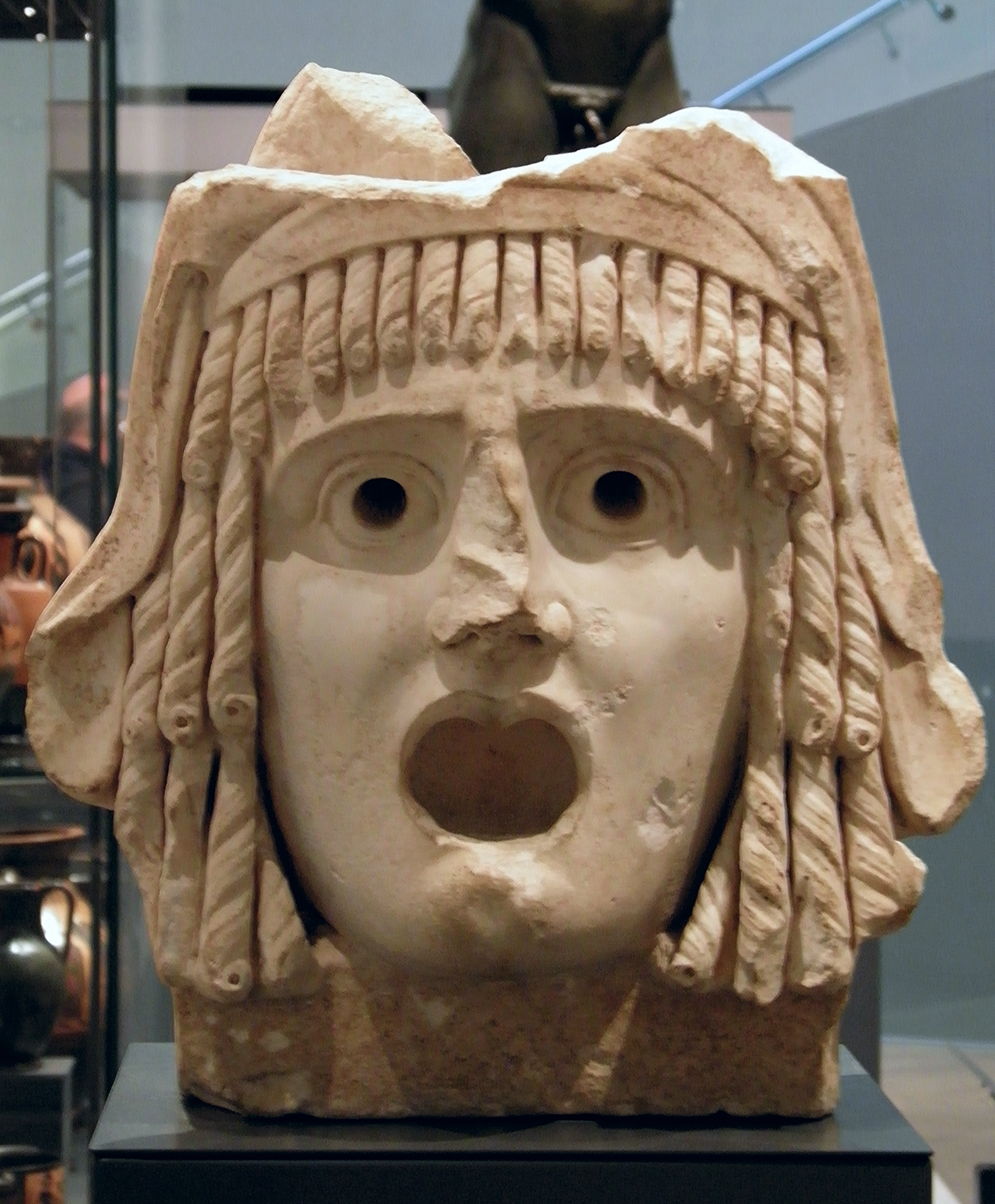
A Greek tragic mask dating to the 1st century BCE or 1st century CE

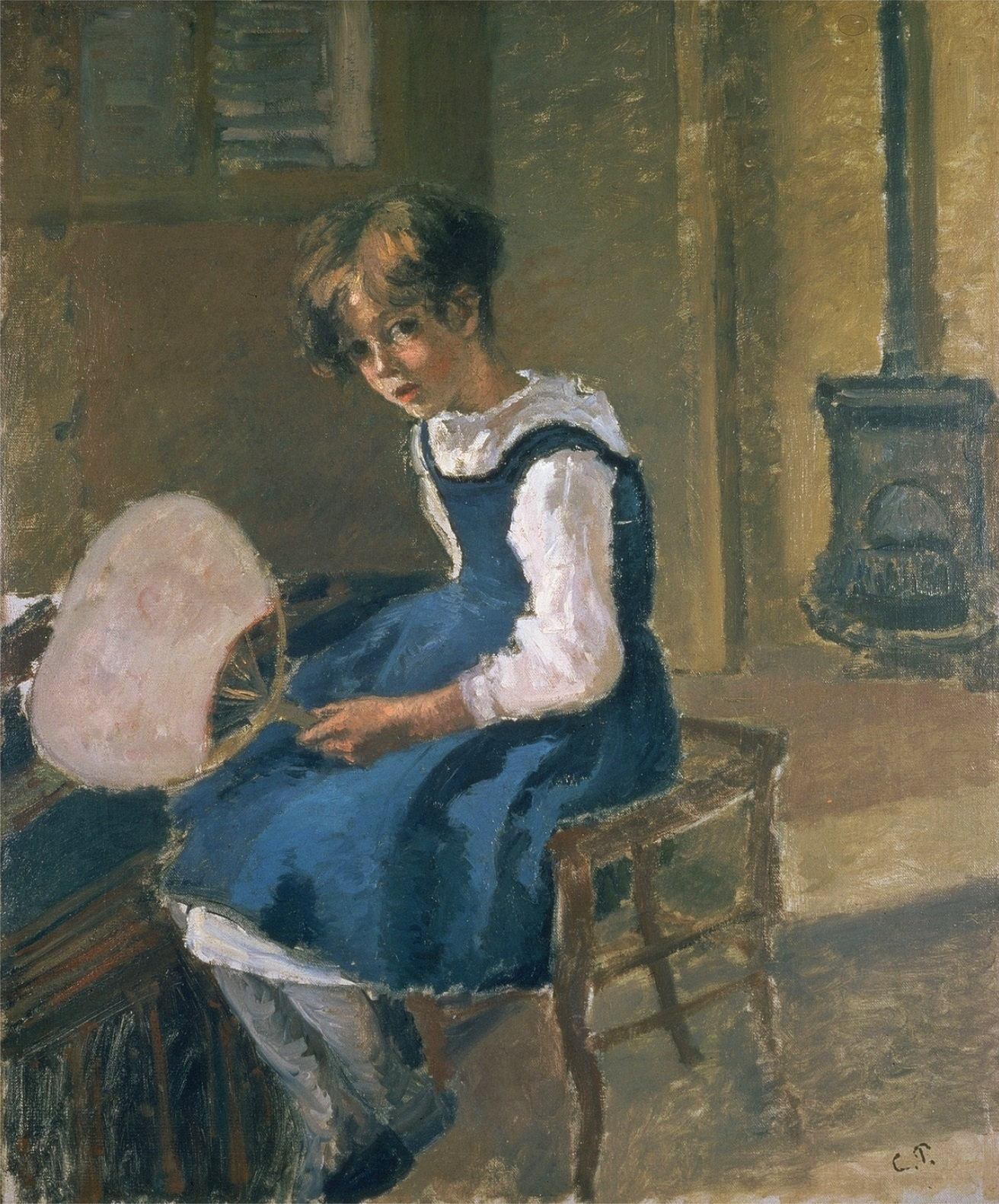
Jeanne Holding a Fan, an oil on canvas painting by Camille Pissarro, c. 1874

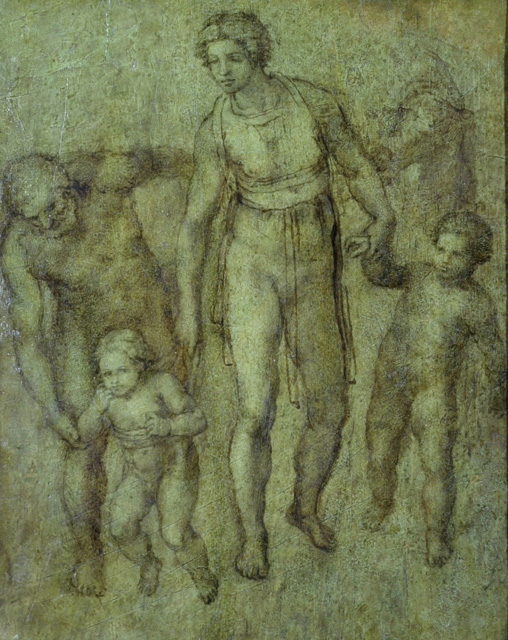
The Holy Family with St John the Baptist, brush and brown wash on panel by Michelangelo

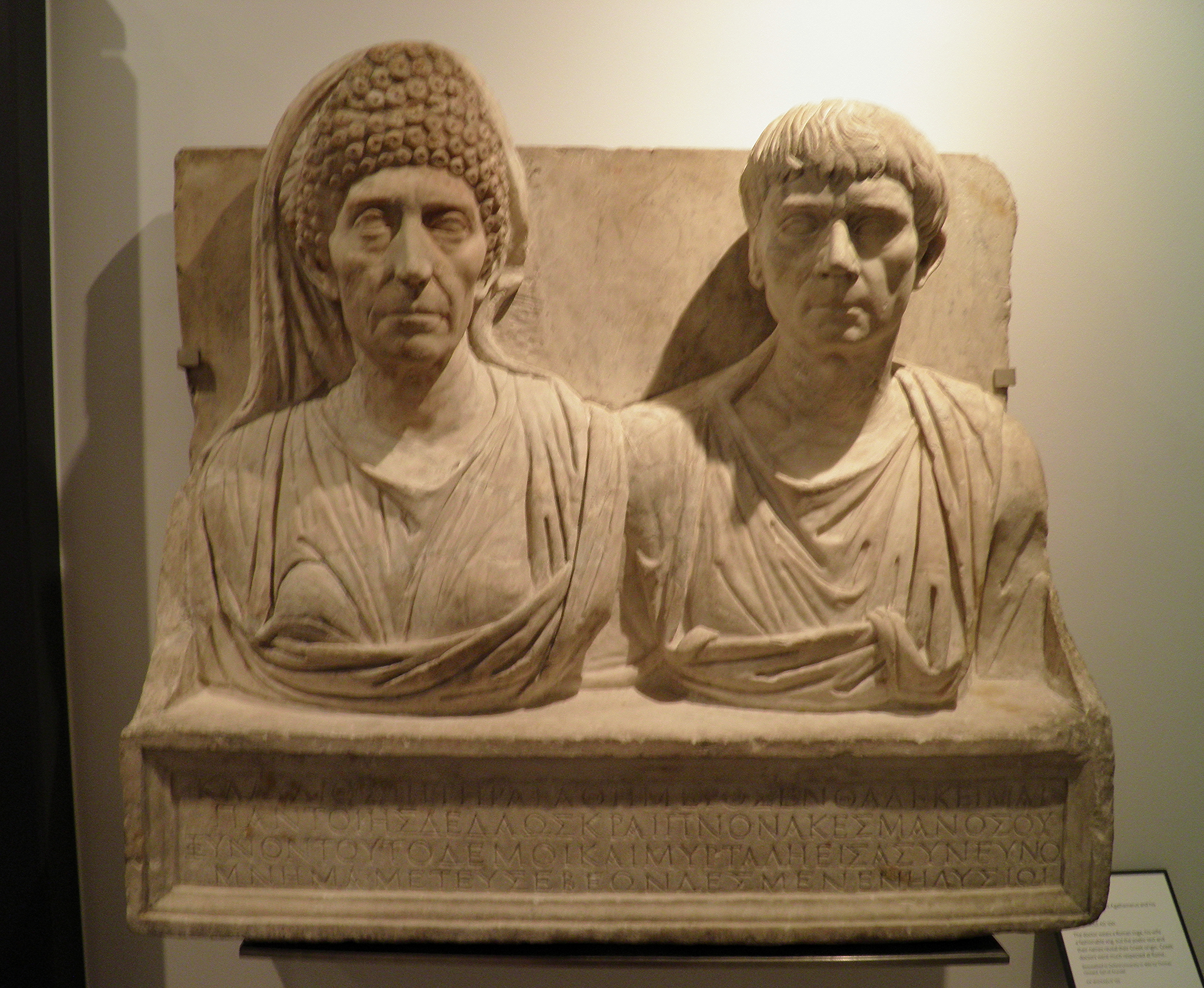
Tombstone, the doctor Claudius Agathemerus and his wife Myrtale, from Rome, about 100 CE

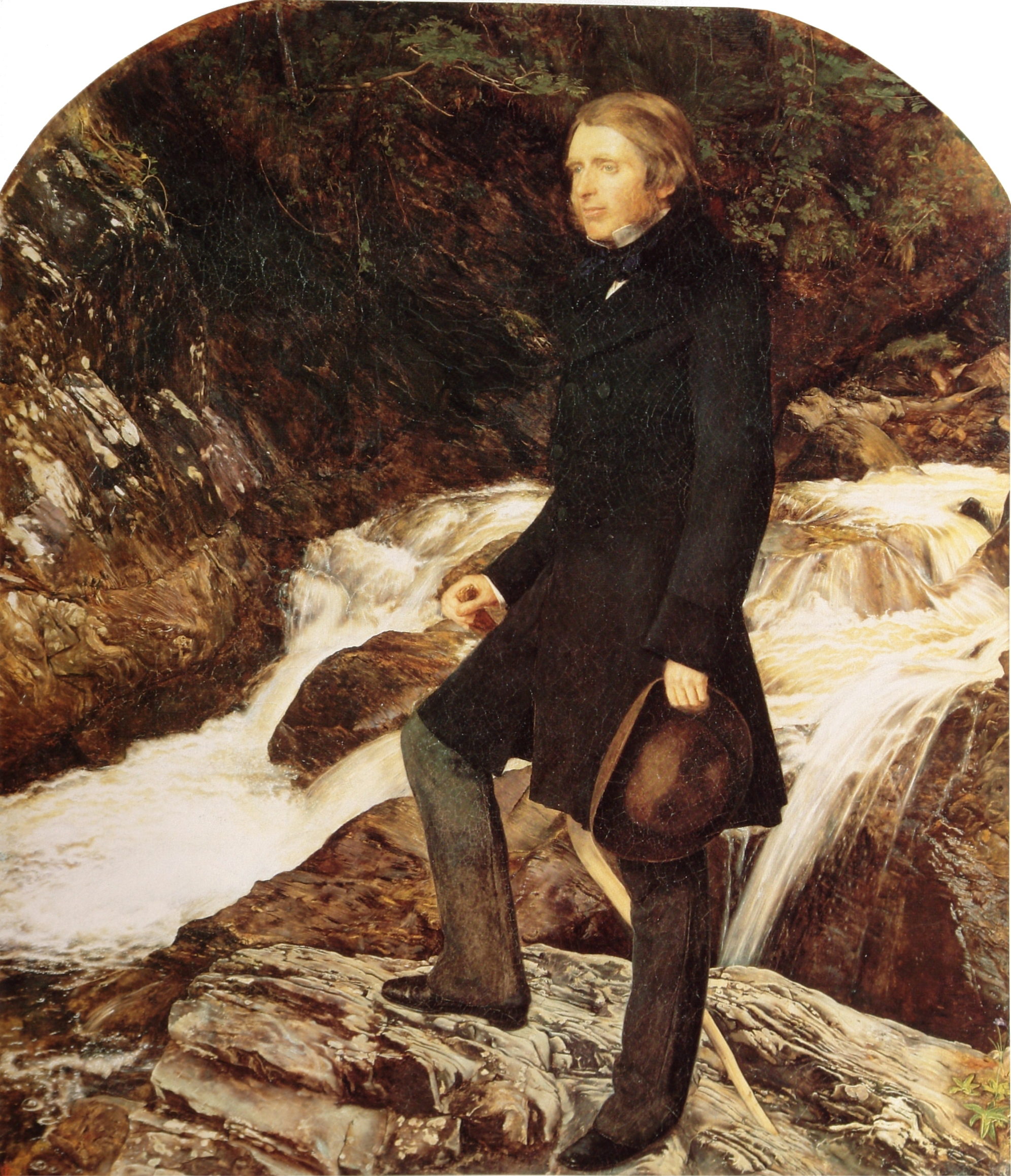
Portrait of John Ruskin by John Everett Millais

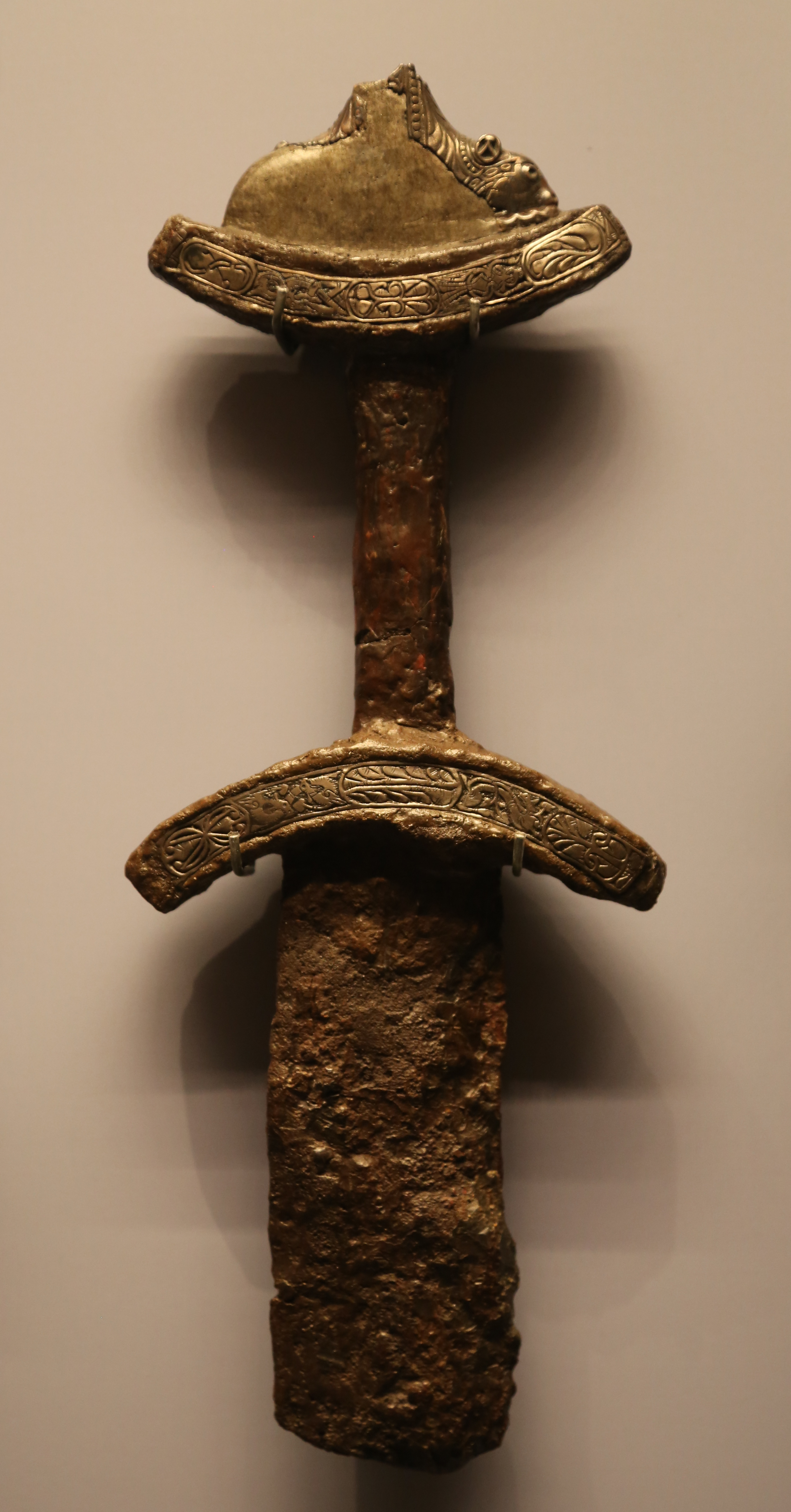
The Abingdon Sword, dating from the late 9th or early 10th century

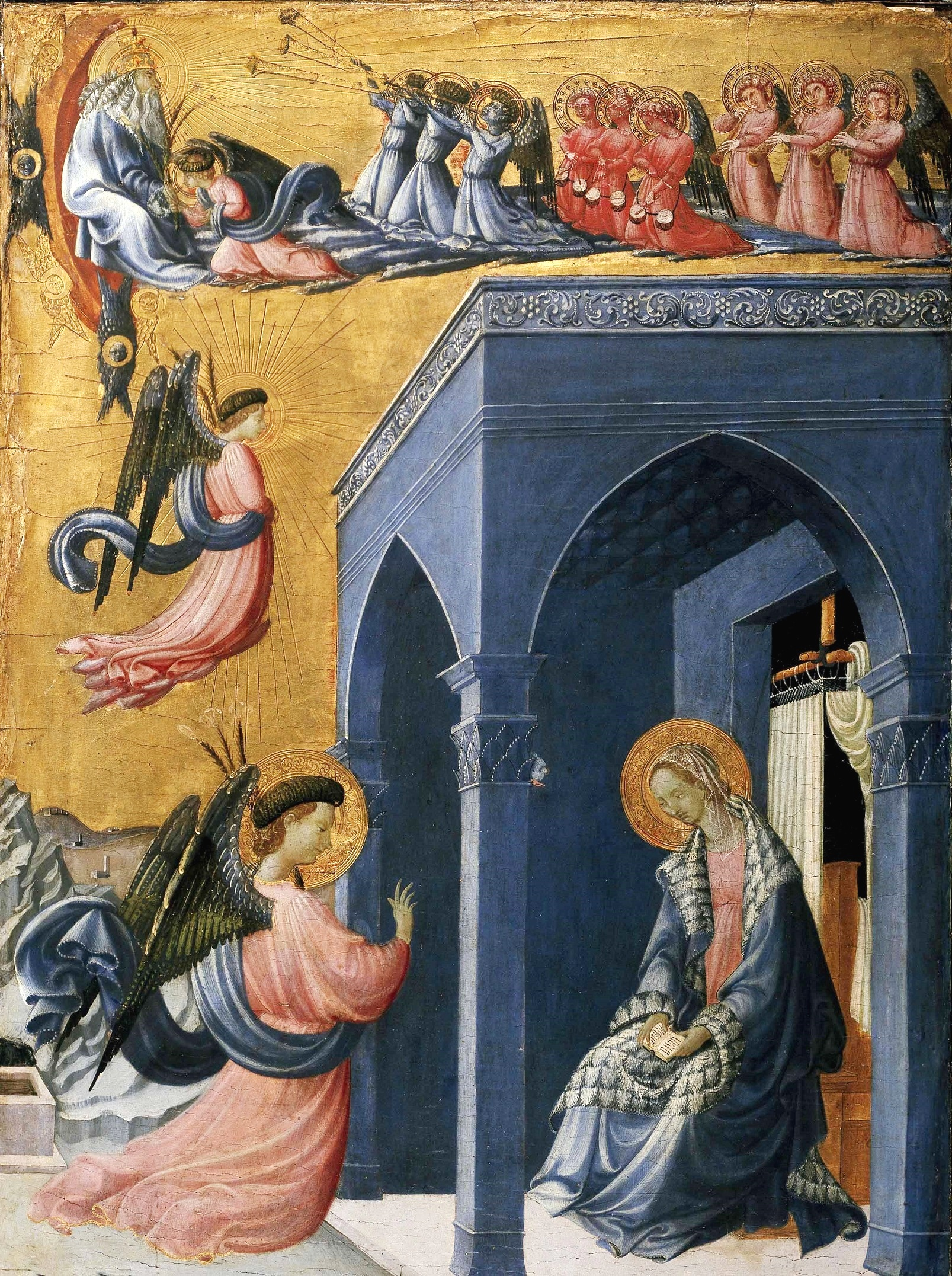
The Annunciation, attributed to Paolo Uccello

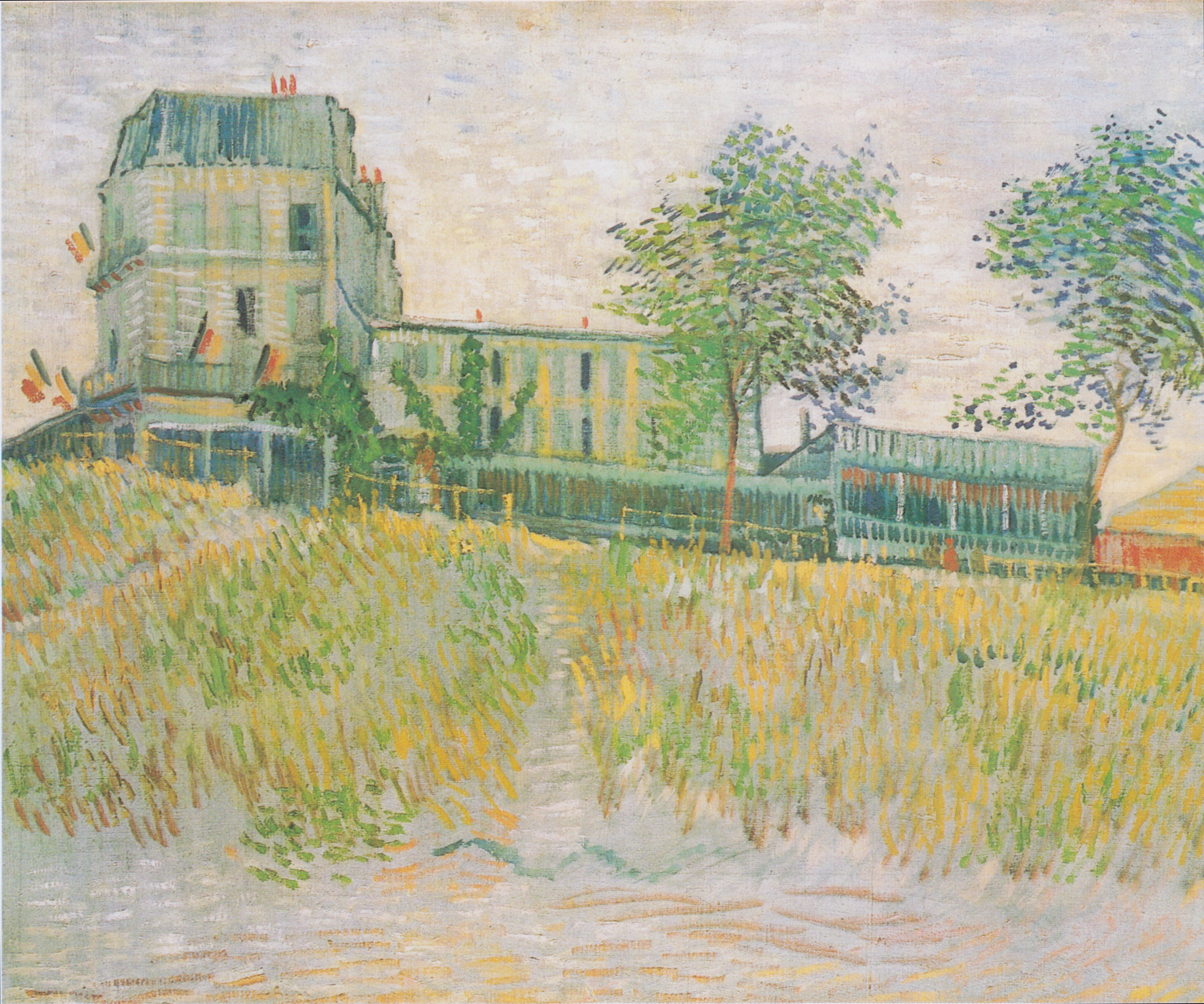
Restaurant de la Sirène, Asnières, by Vincent van Gogh

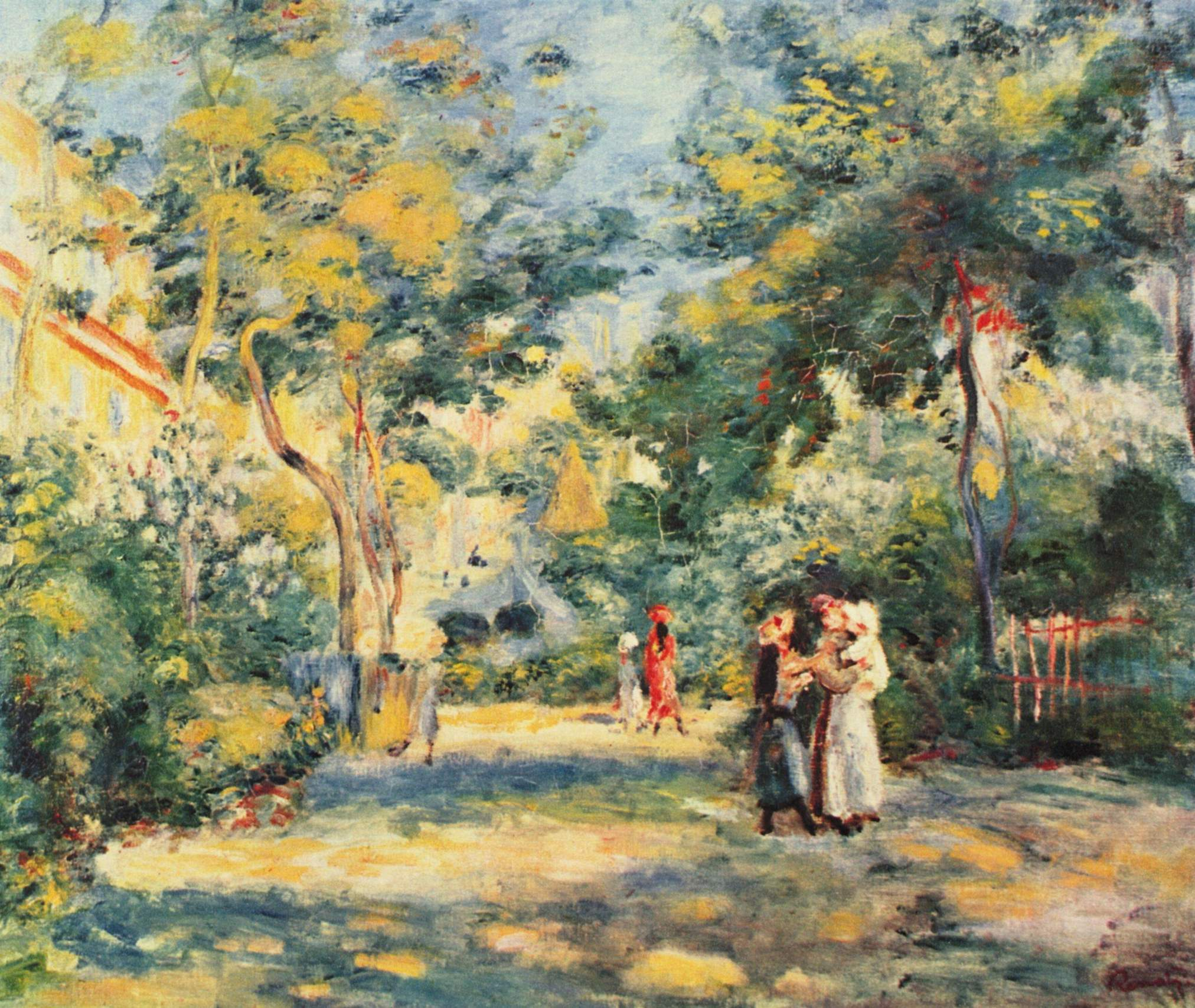
A Garden in Montmartre by Pierre-Auguste Renoir

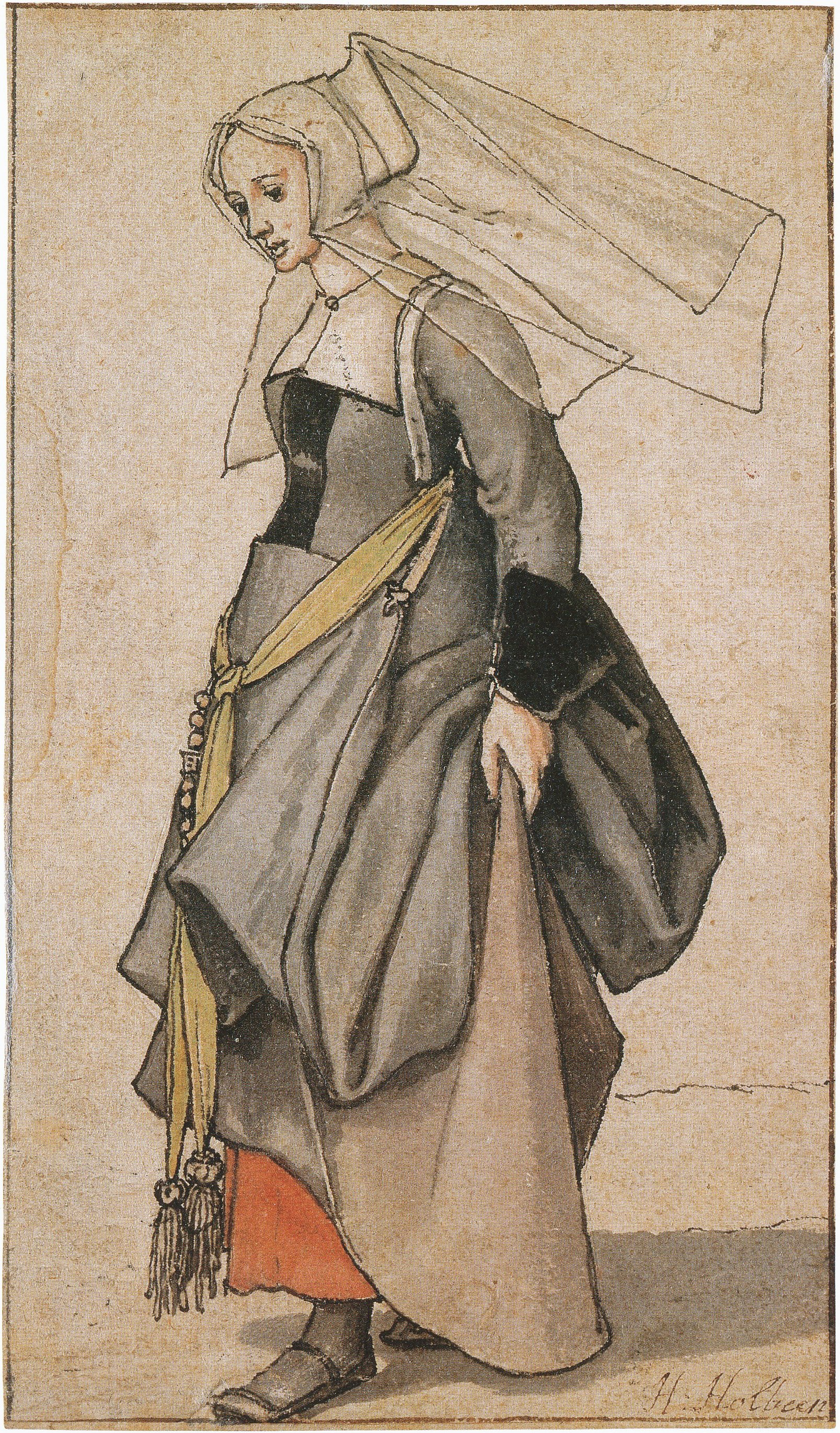
Young Englishwoman, a costume study by Hans Holbein the Younger

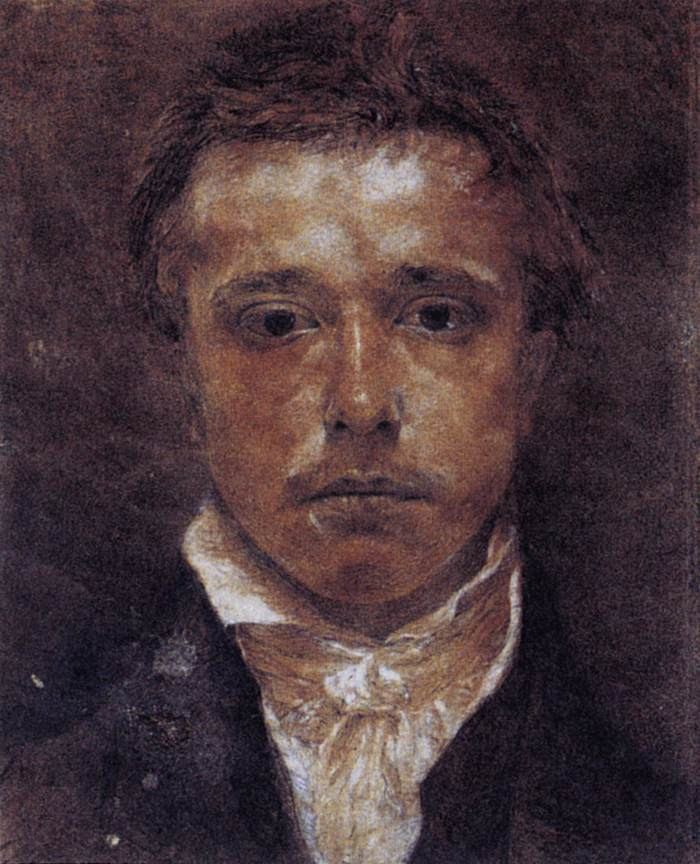
A self-portrait by Samuel Palmer

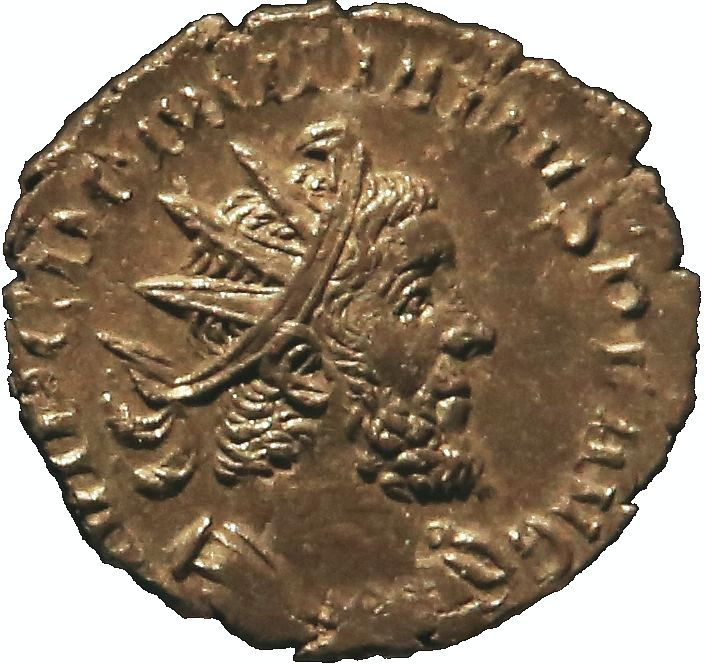
A coin of Domitianus II

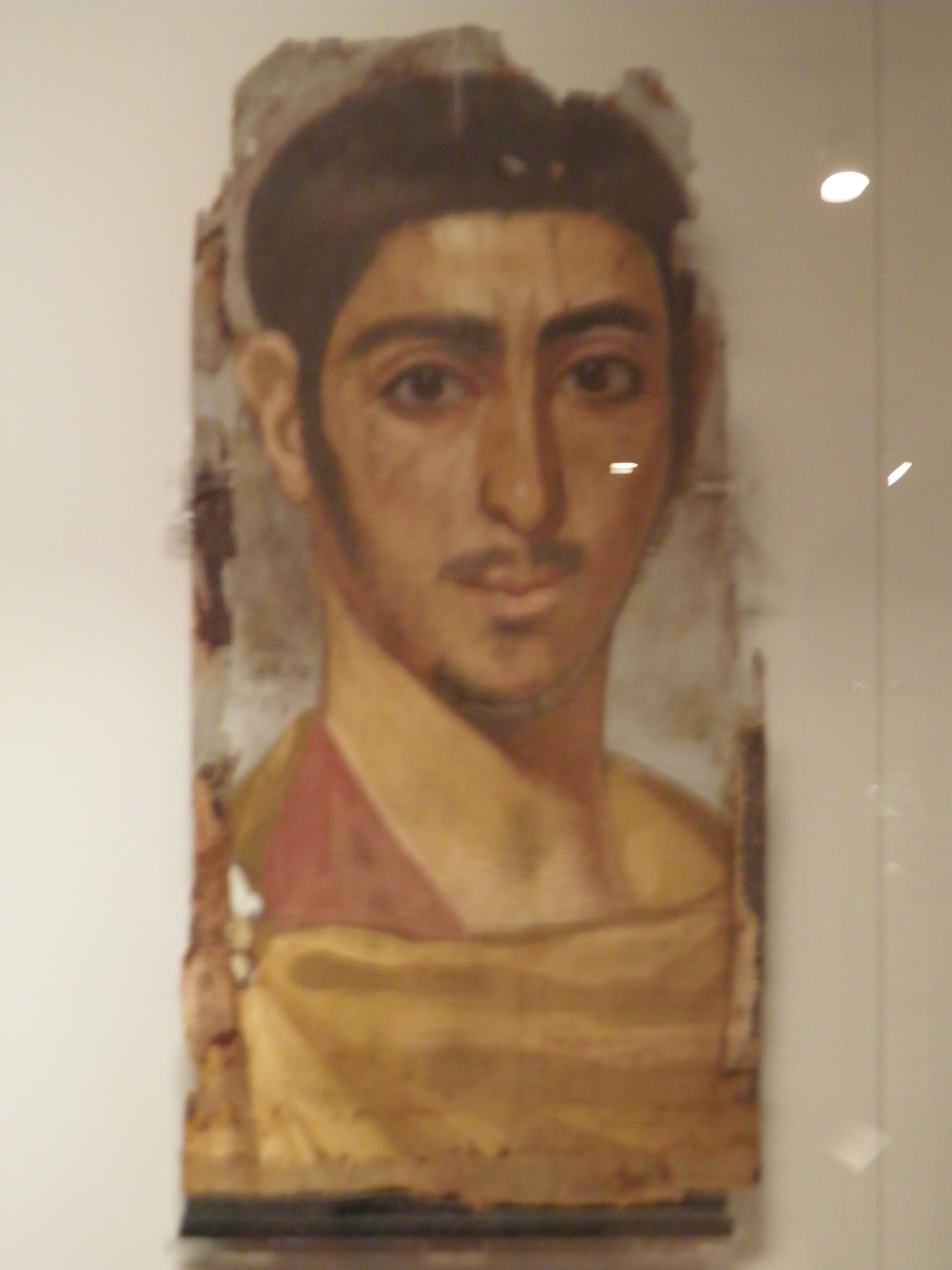
Egyptian Mummy Portrait

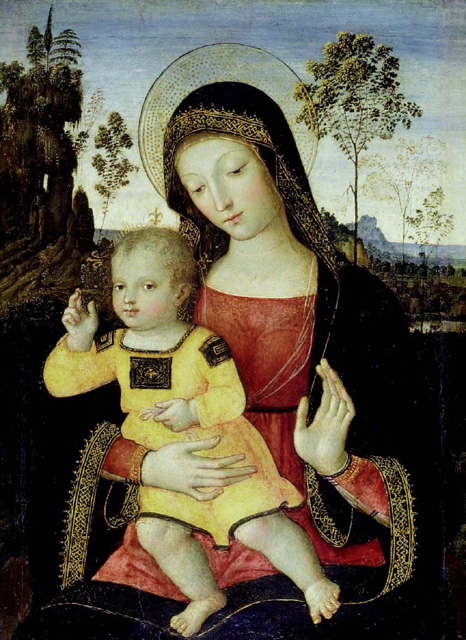
The Virgin and Child, by Bernardino Pintoricchio

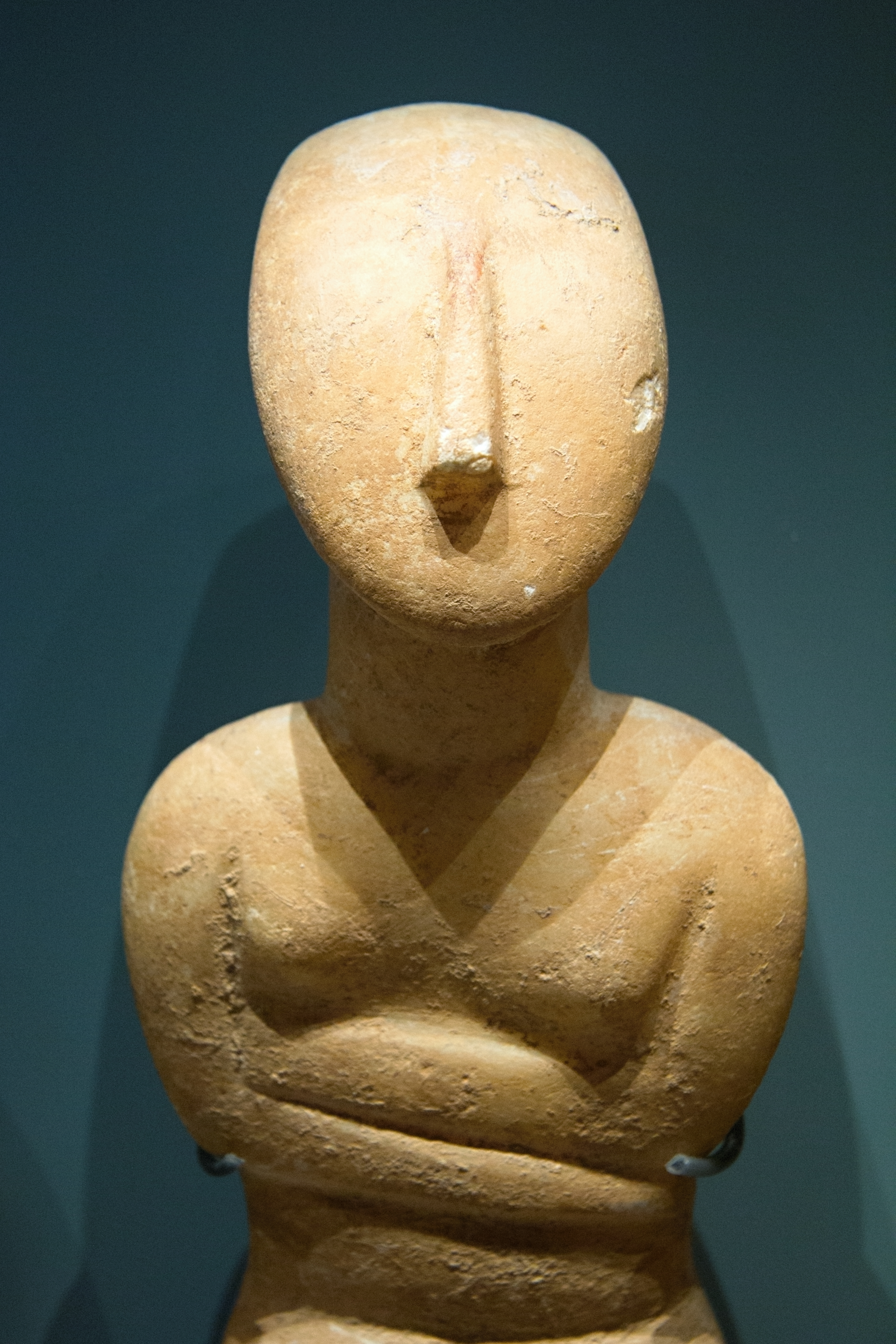
Early Bronze Age Cycladic art figurine, 2800–2300 BC

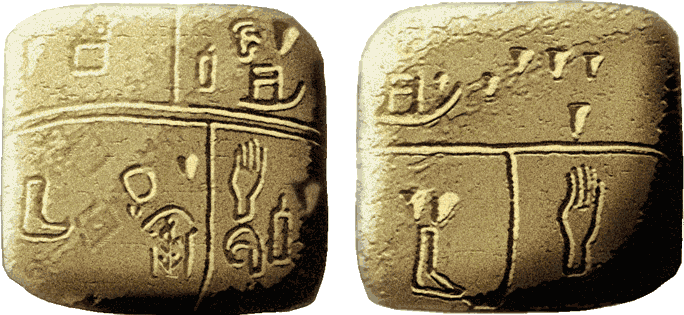
The Kish tablet cast

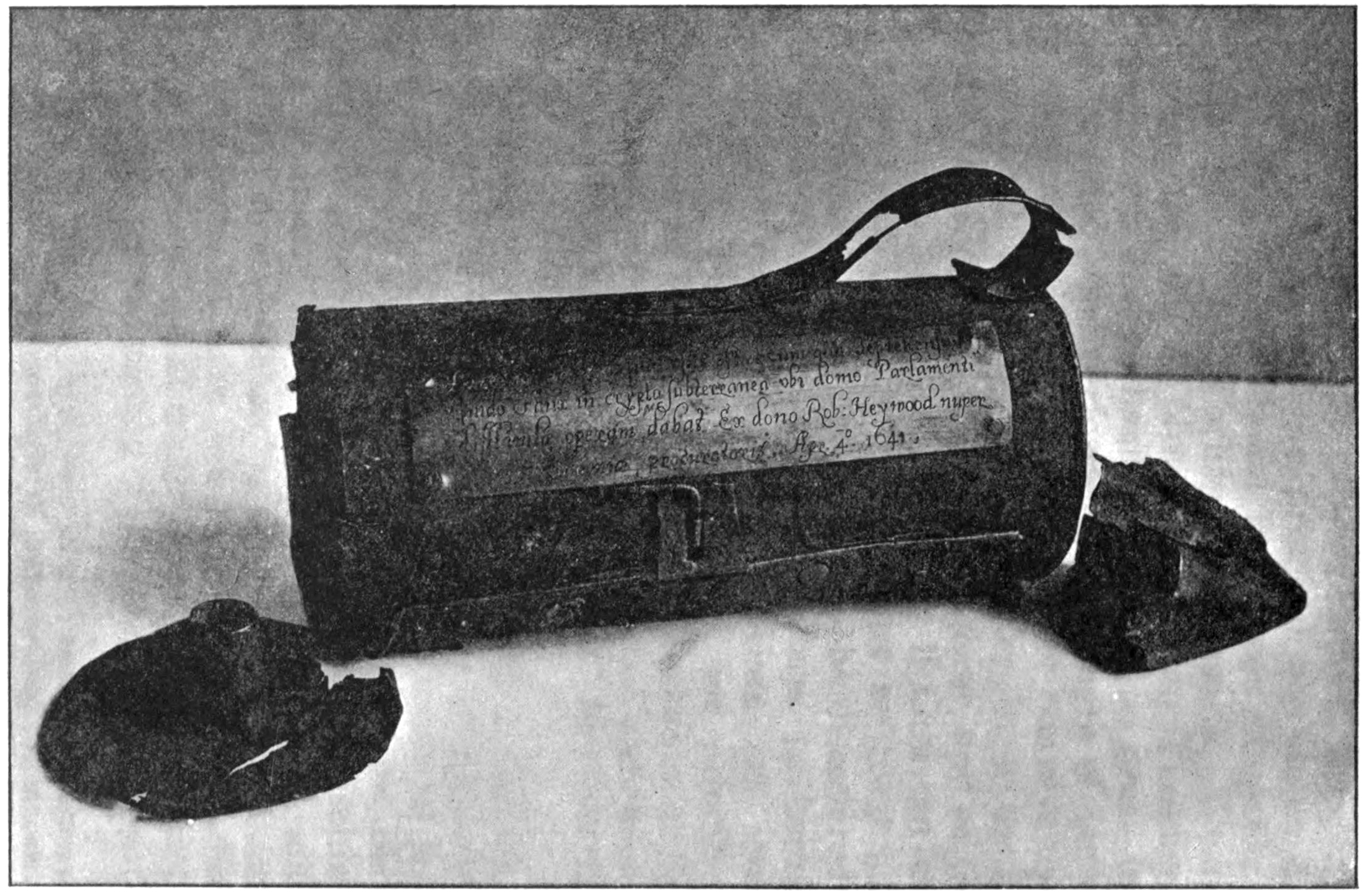
Guy Fawkes' Lantern, London, England c. 1605 Iron and horn

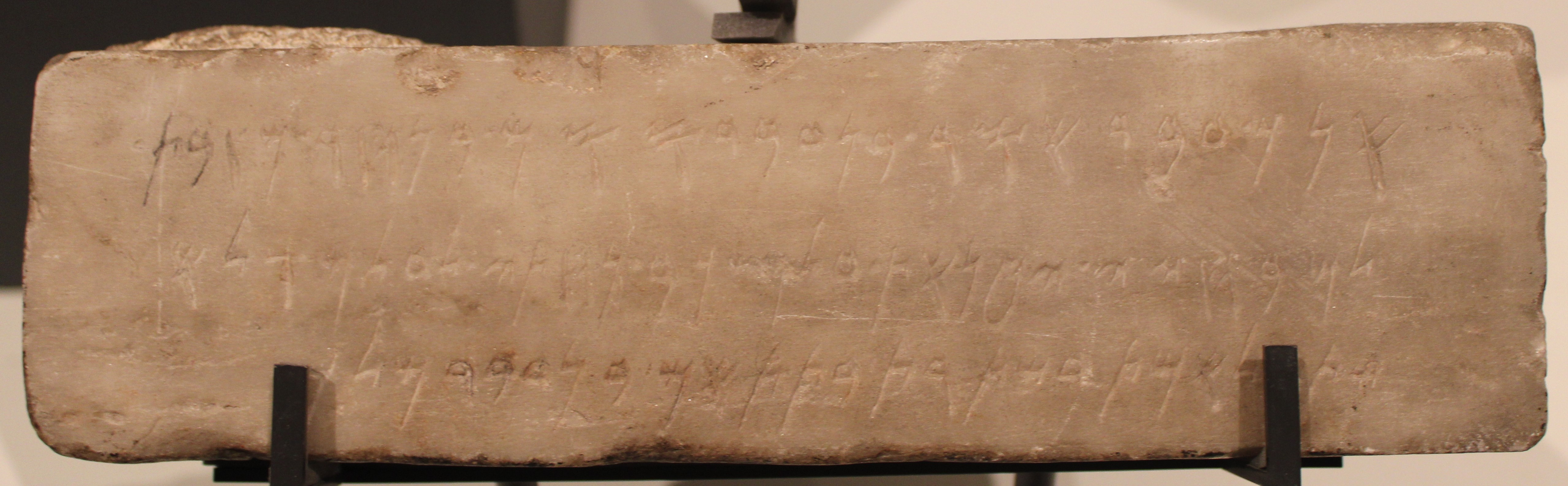
The sole surviving Pococke Kition inscription, used by Jean-Jacques Barthélemy in his decipherment of the Phoenician language

== Arundel Marbles ==
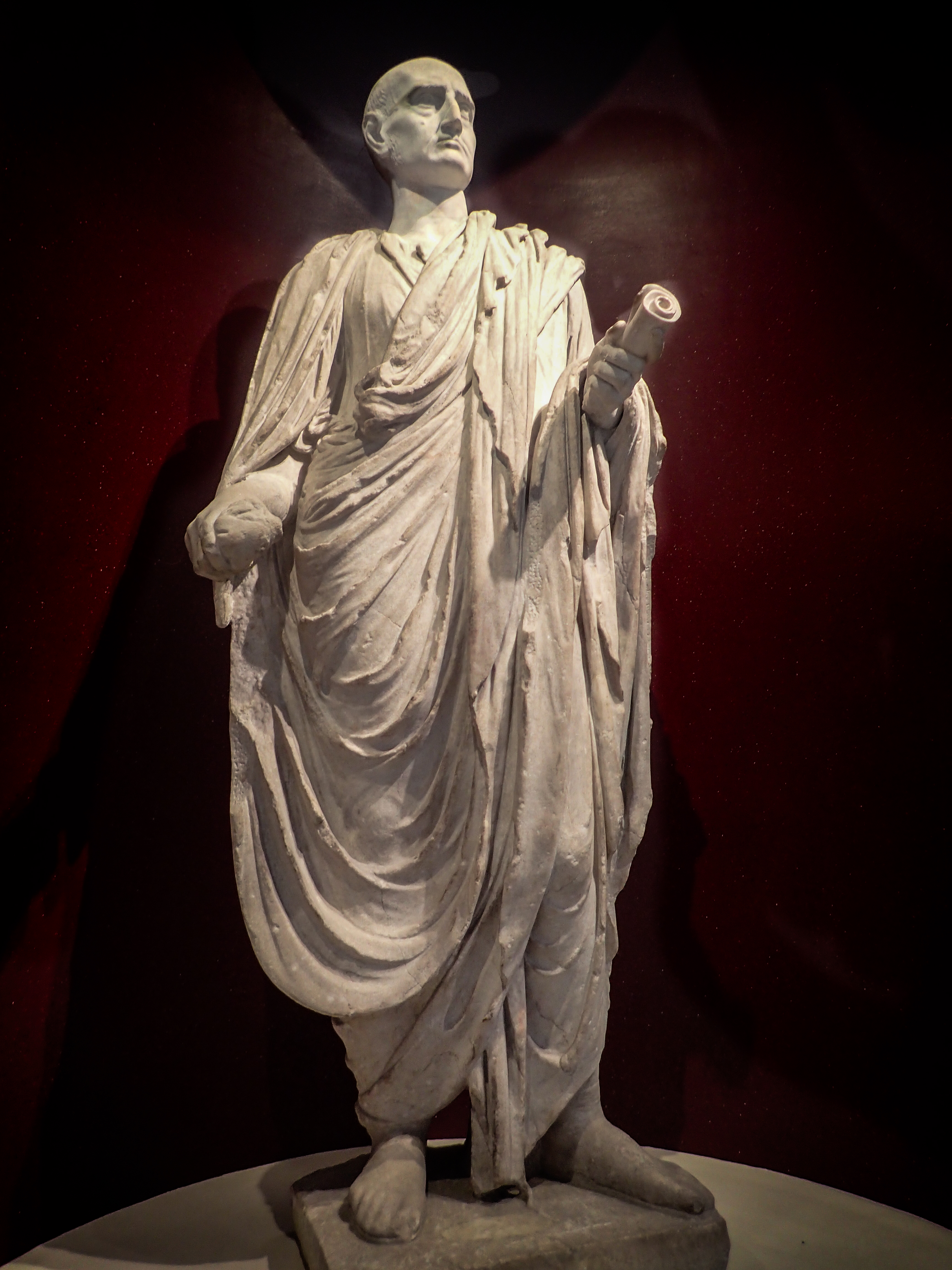
So-called Cicero excavated by the Earl of Arundel in Rome between 1613 and 1614

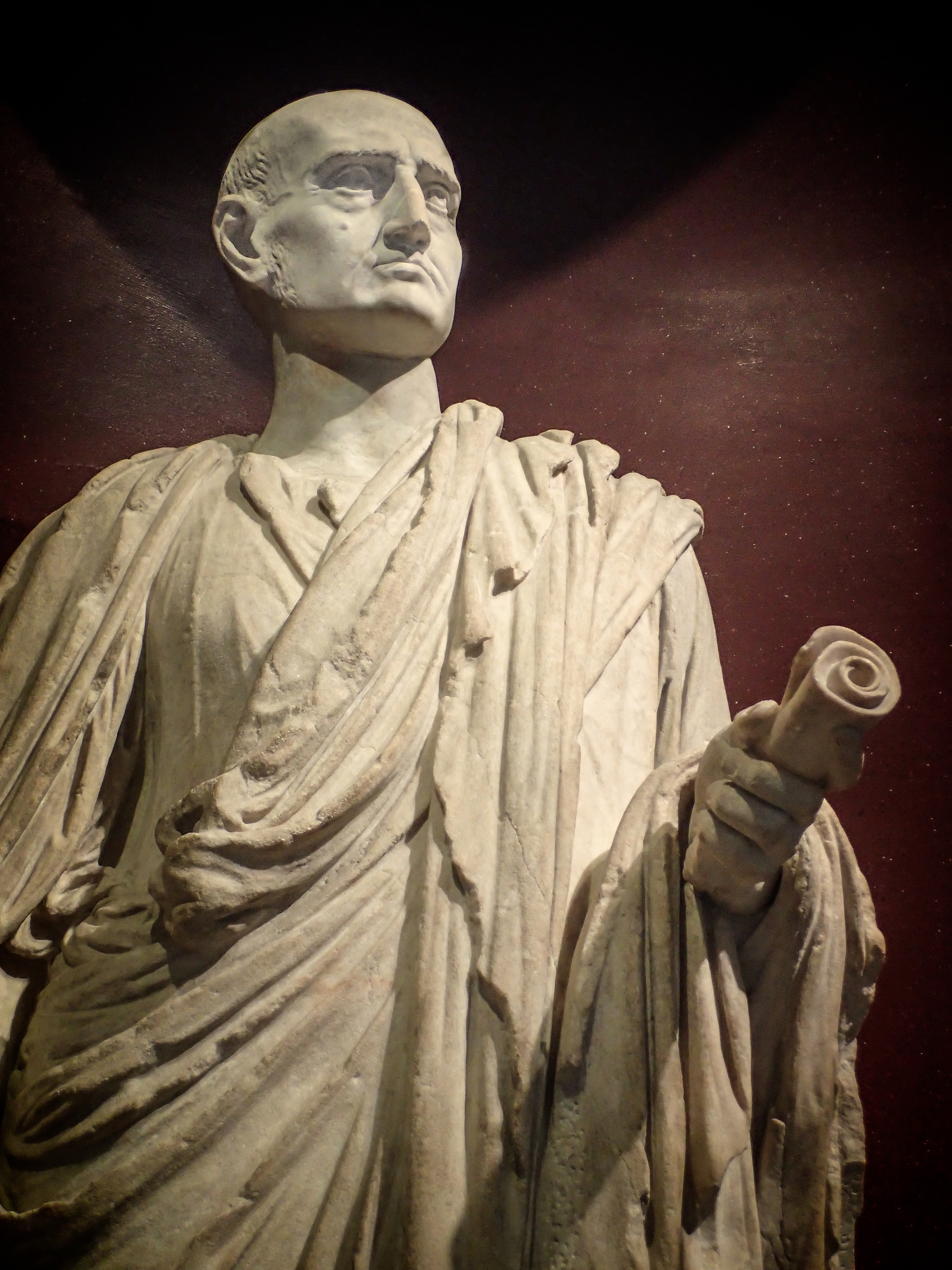
So-called Cicero excavated by the Earl of Arundel in Rome between 1613 and 1614

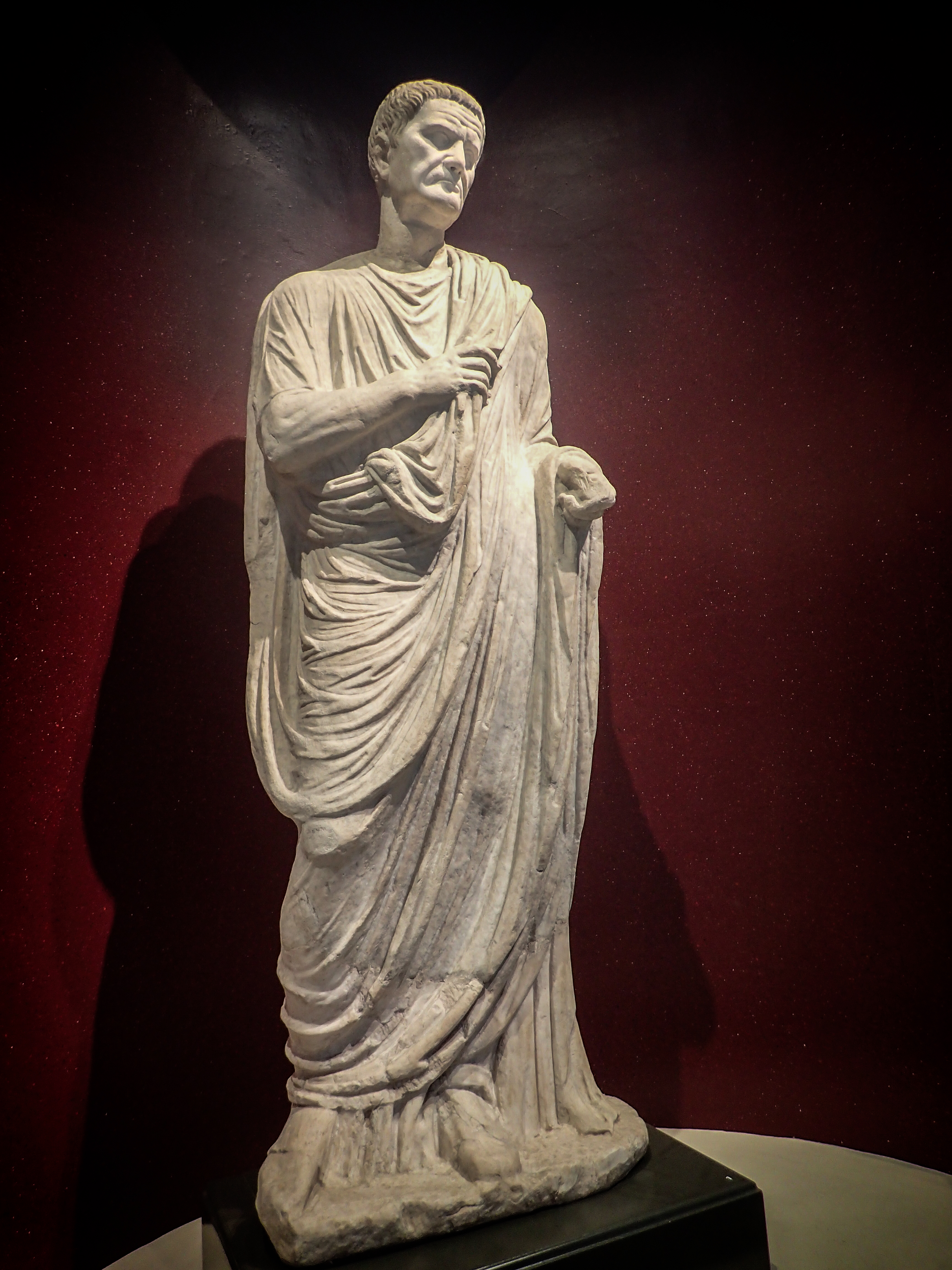
Man wearing a toga excavated in Rome 1613–1614 and later given the name "Caius Marius"

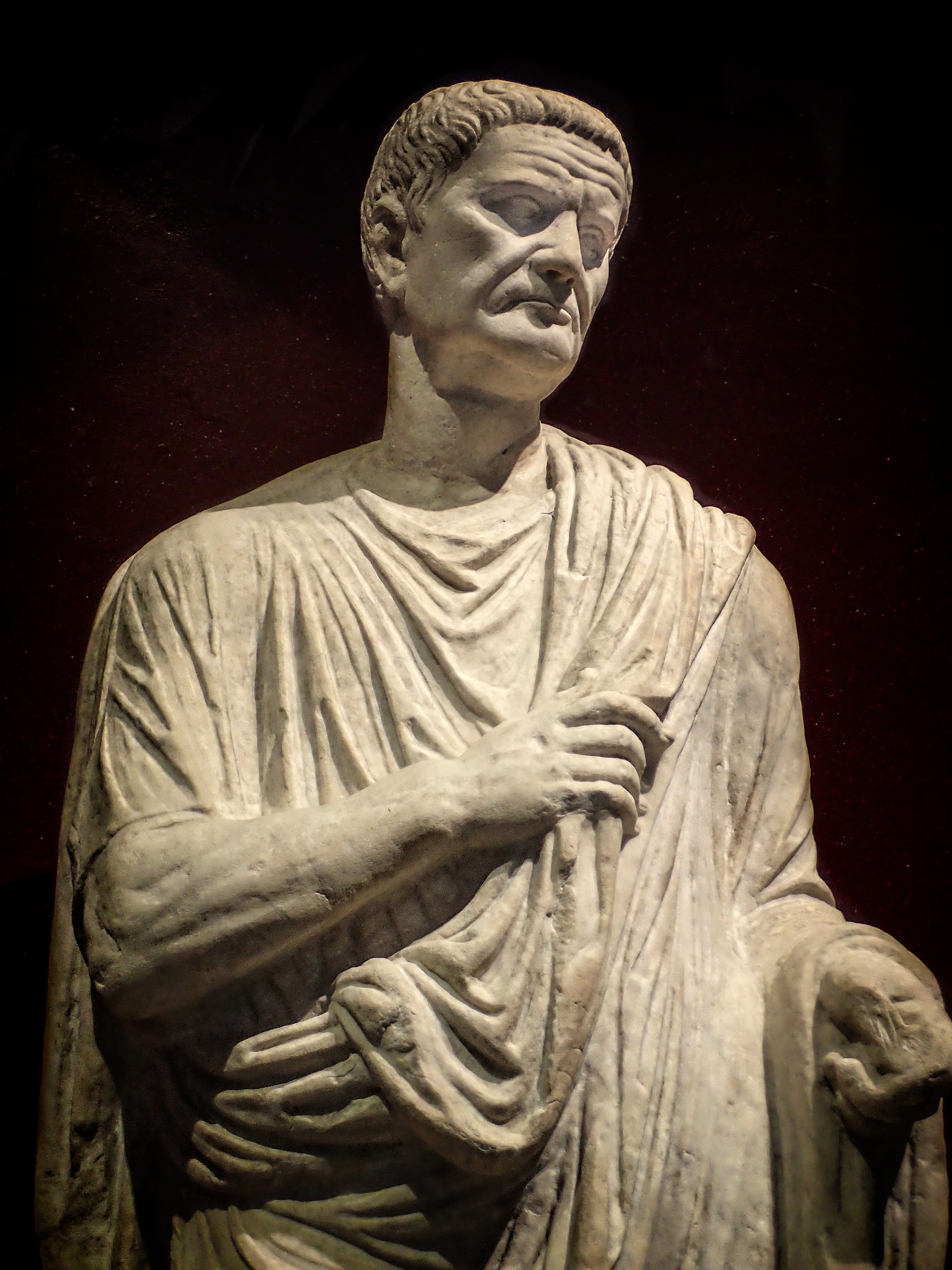
First century CE togate torso bearing a 17th-century CE head dubbed Caius Marius by the Earl of Arundel excavated in 1613–1614 CE

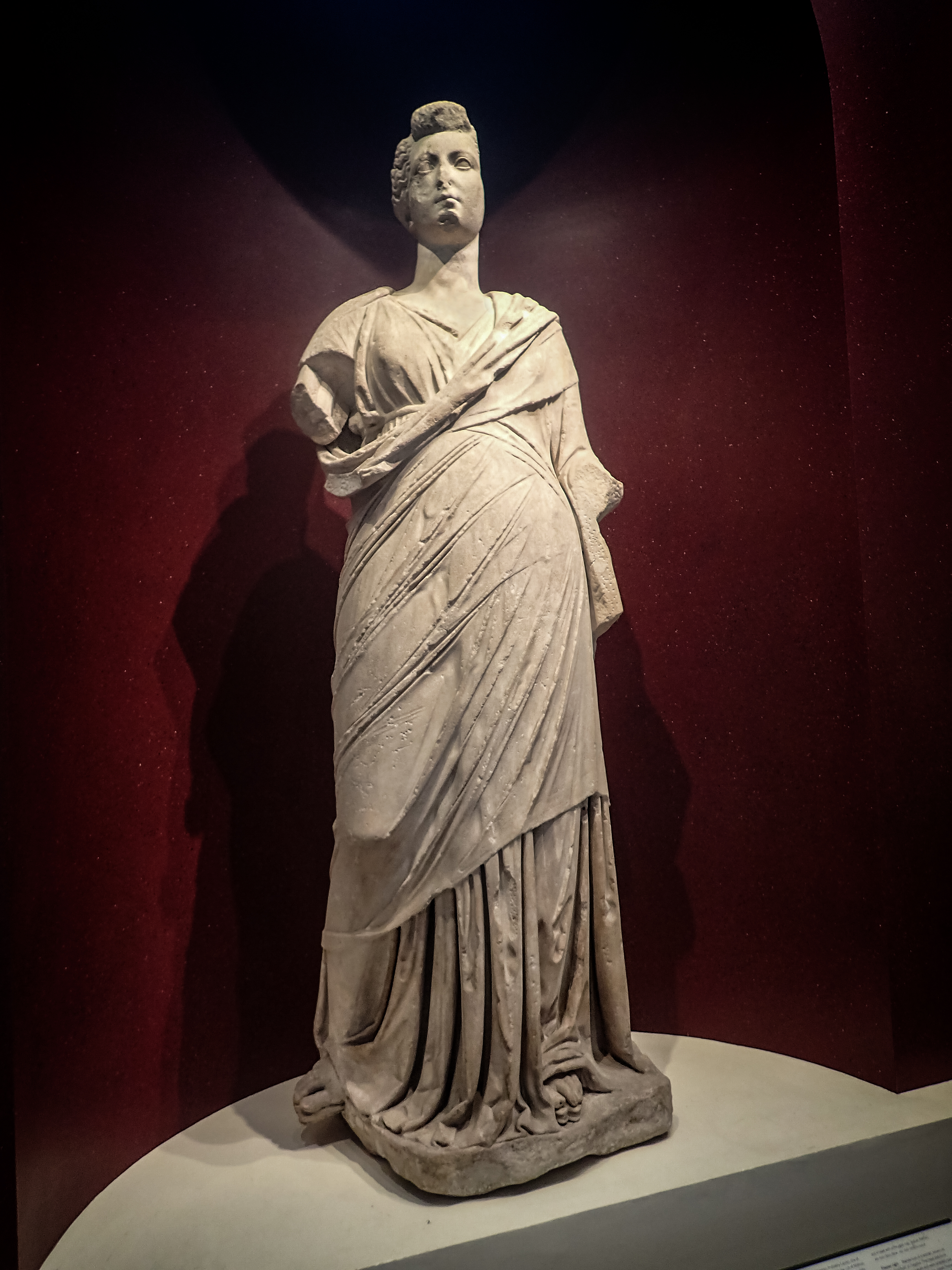
Statue of a woman with hairstyle dating to the later Roman Republican or Augustan period but body dating to 200–100 BCE

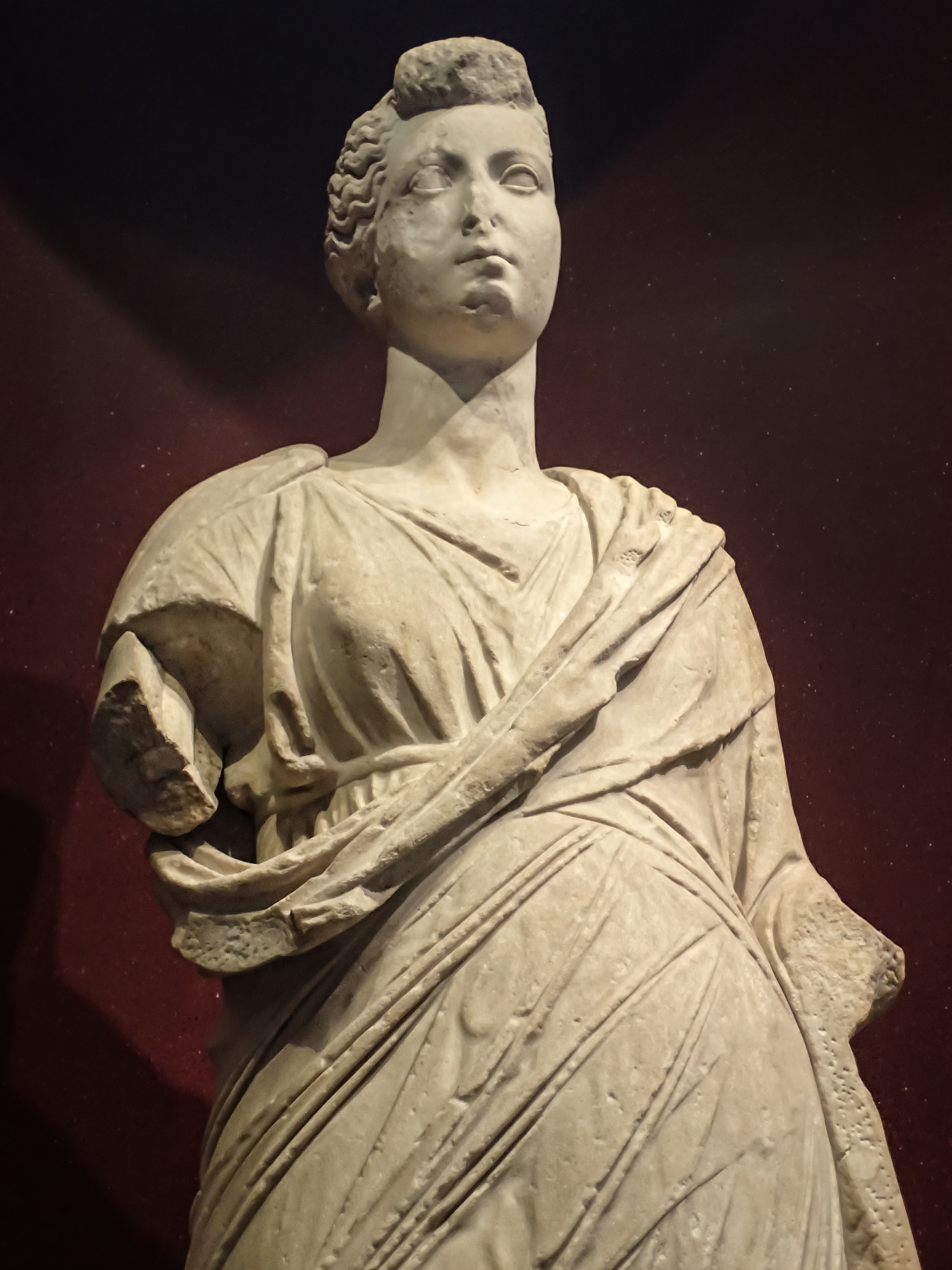
Closeup of Statue of a woman with hairstyle dating to the later Roman Republican or Augustan period but body dating to 200–100 BCE

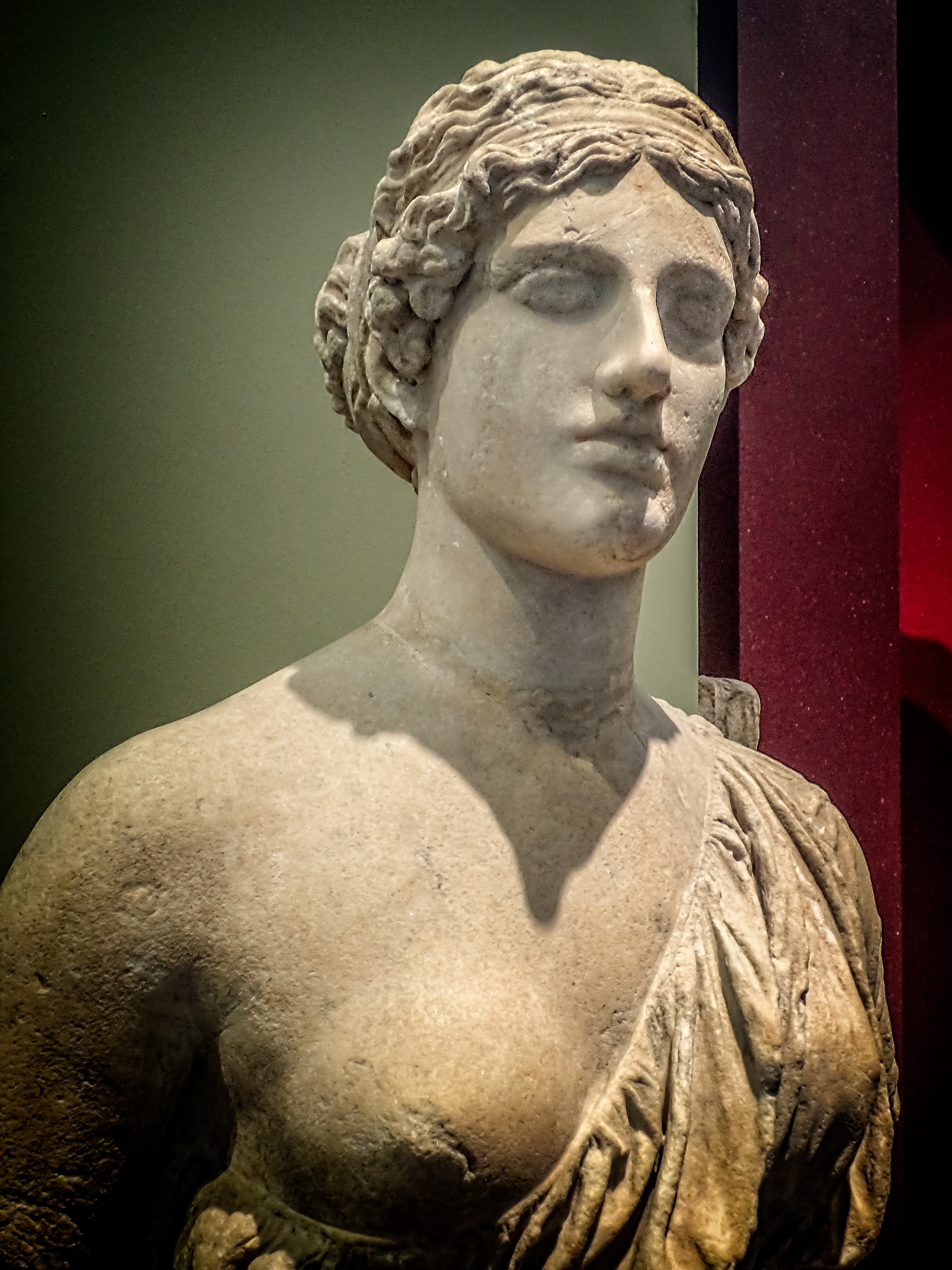
The Oxford Bust or "Sappho" with head and torso coming from different statues and probably put together by a sculptor in the 1600s

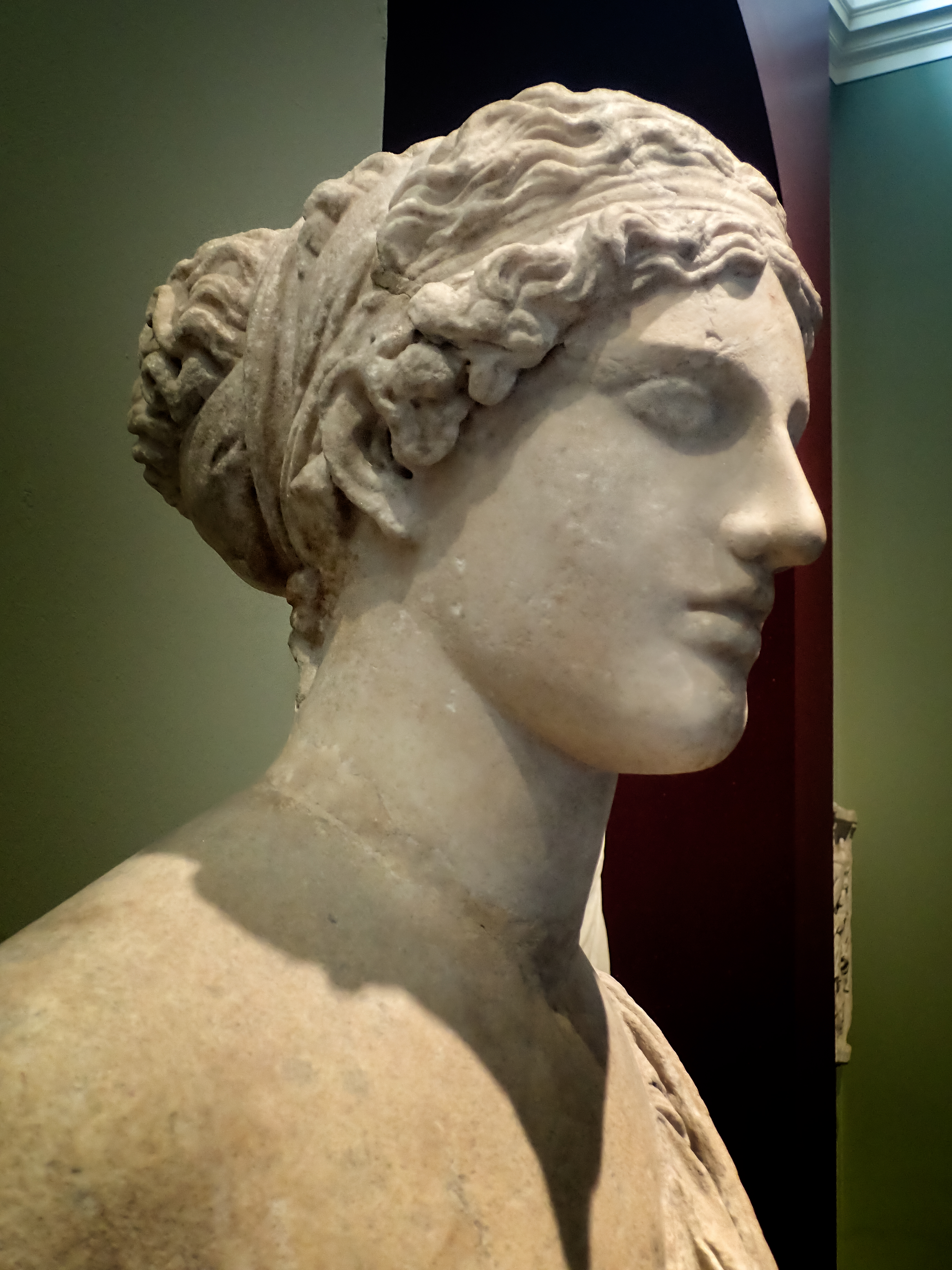
The Oxford Bust or "Sappho" with head and torso coming from different statues and probably put together by a sculptor in the 1600s View 2

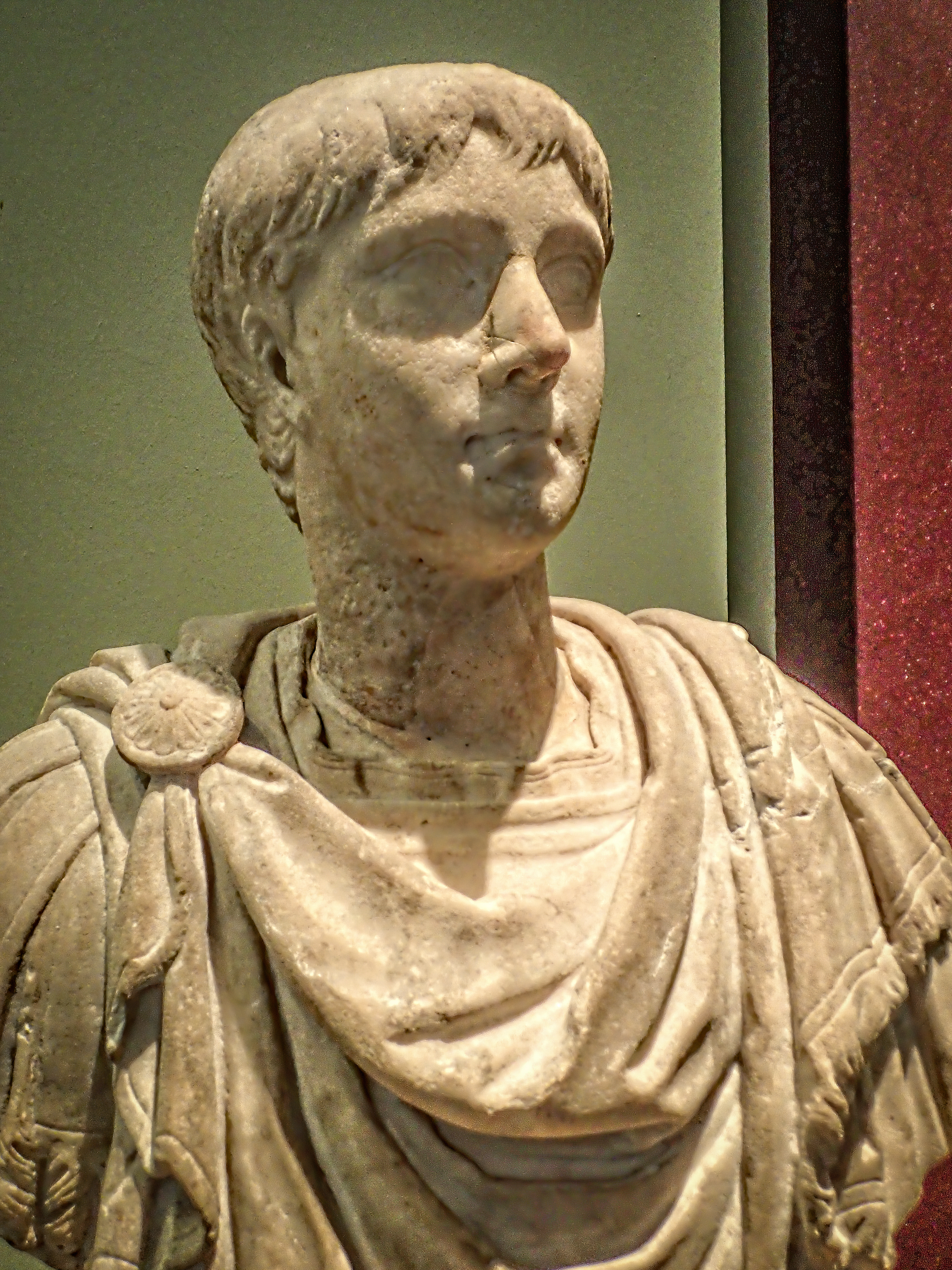
Portrait of a young man with hairstyle, facial features and long neck pointing to portraits made in the early 100s CE

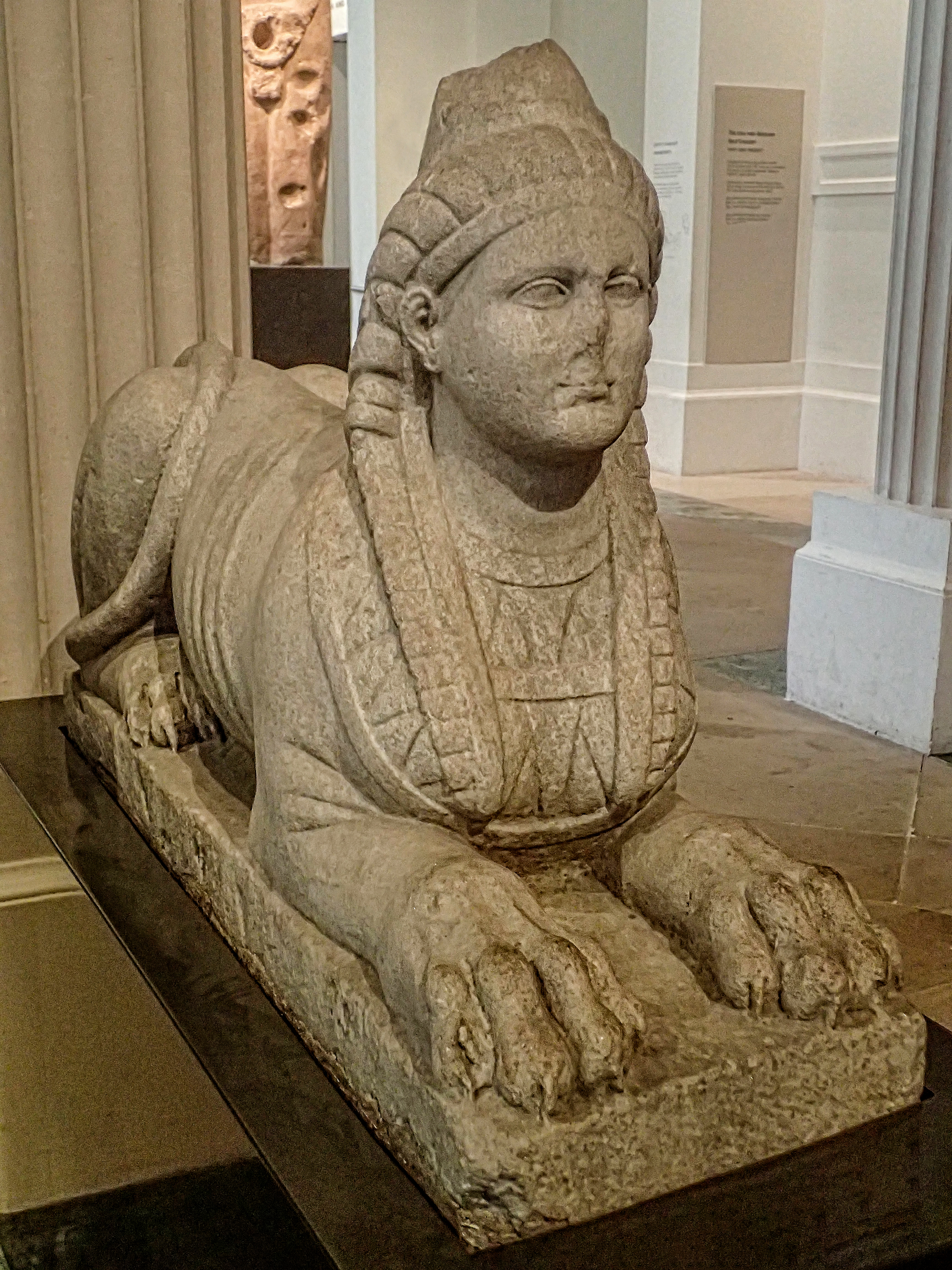
Sphinx commissioned by the Earl of Arundel to partner a Roman Sphinx, 17th century CE

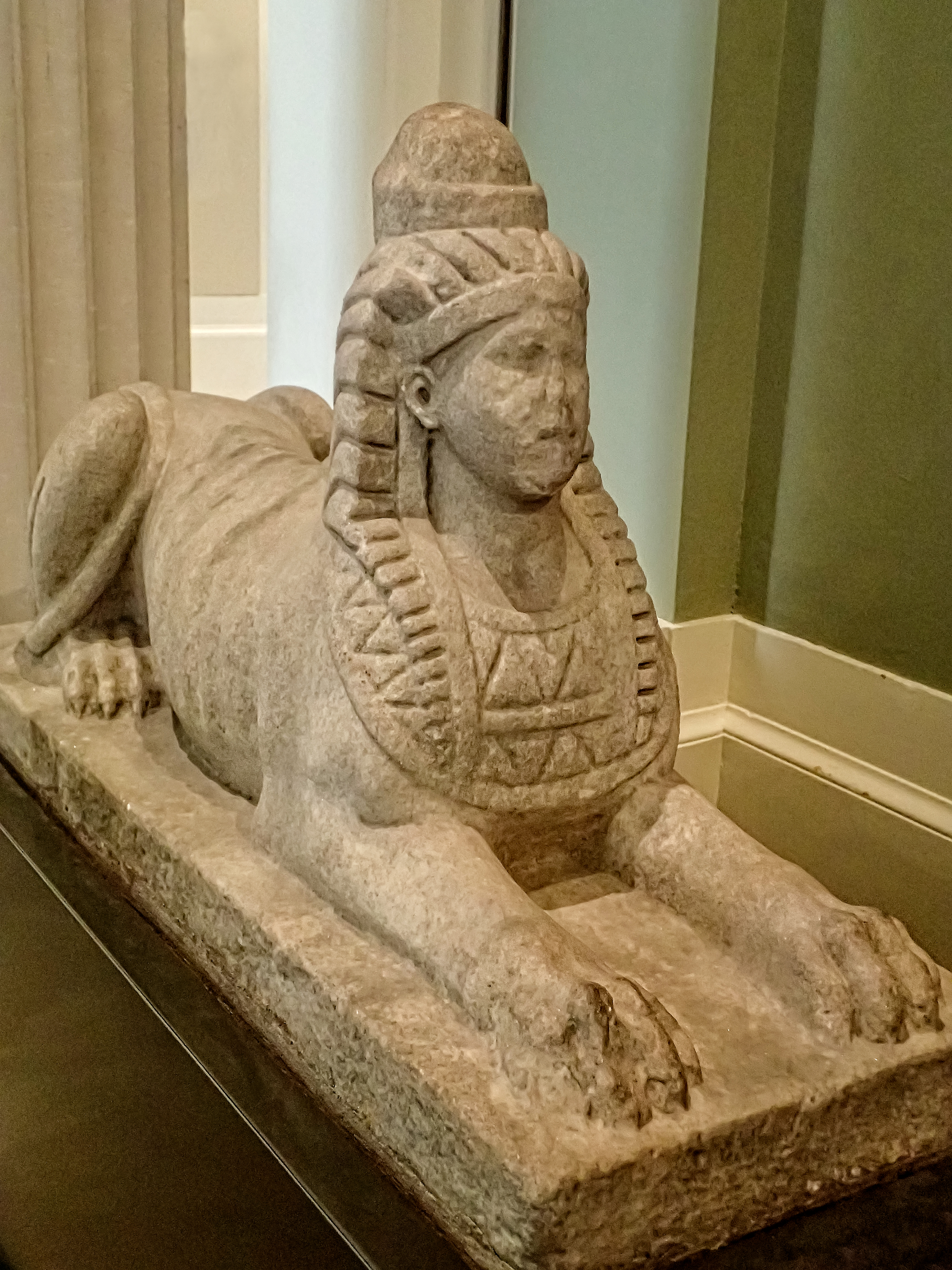
Sphinx, Roman, 50–200 CE.

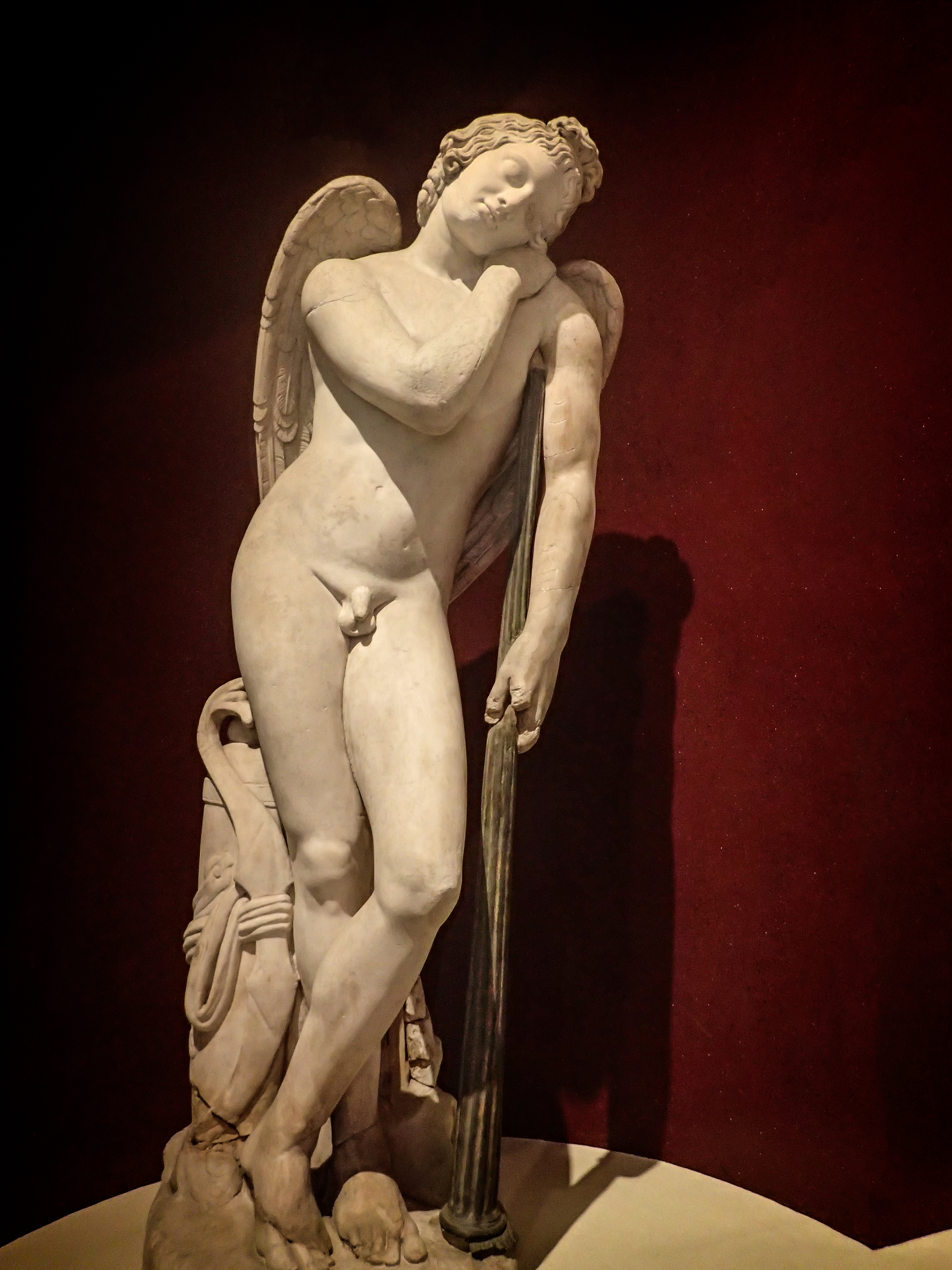
Roman statue of Eros, 100–200 CE depicting Eros sleeping, his torch turned down, a symbol of death used in many Roman memorials.

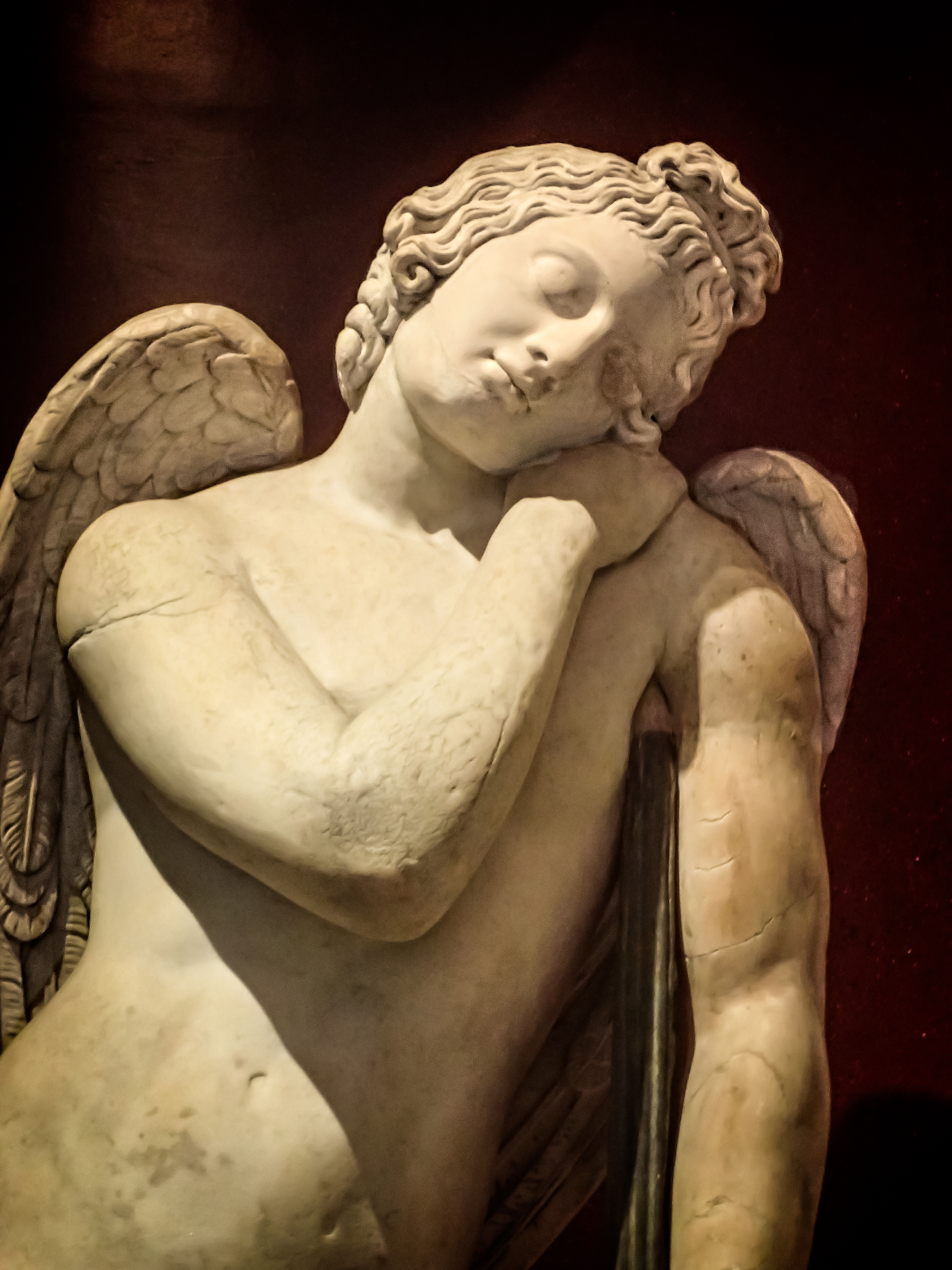
Closeup of Roman statue of Eros, 100–200 CE depicting Eros sleeping, his torch turned down, a symbol of death used in many Roman memorials.

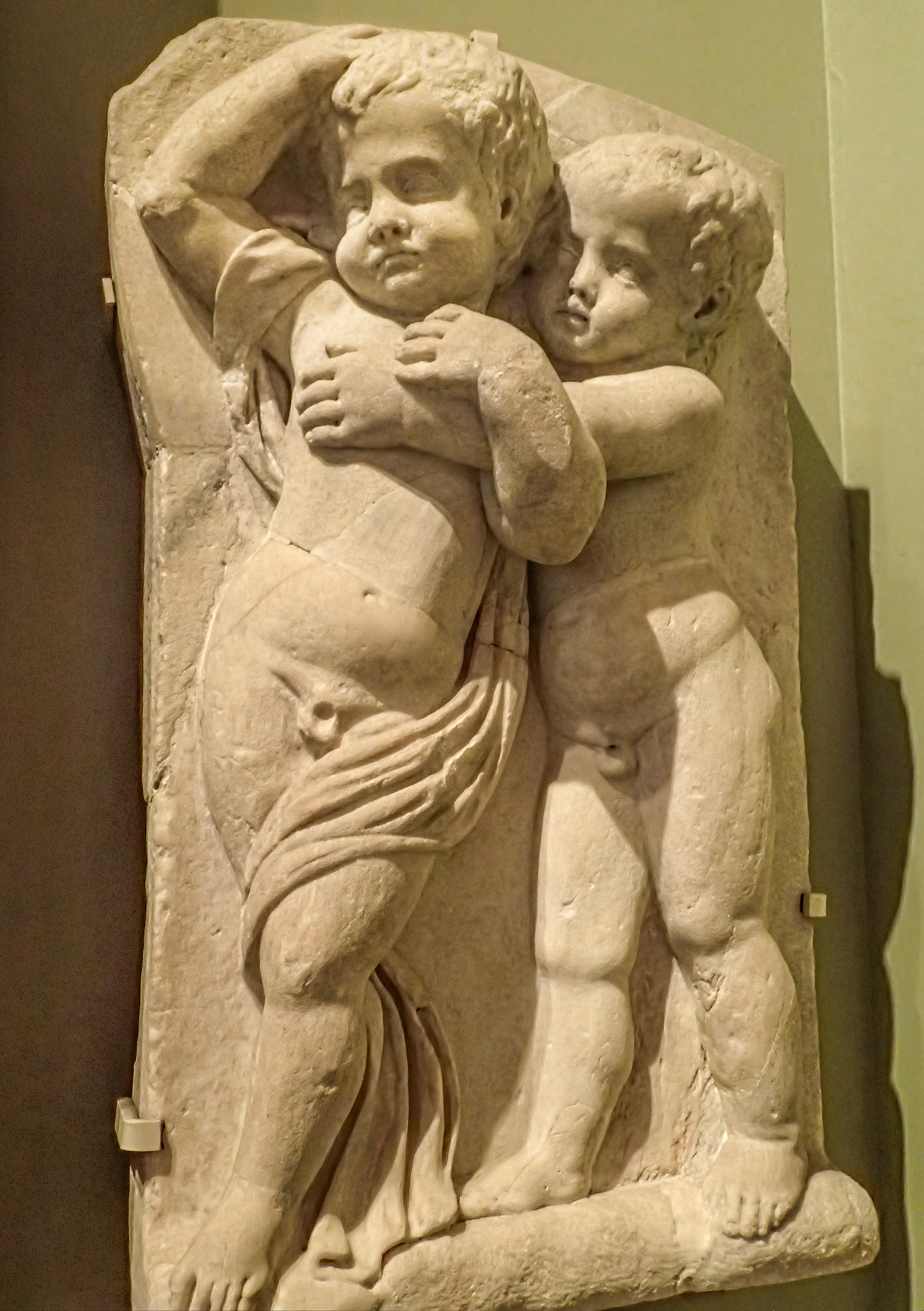
Fragment of a marble sarcophagus depicting two drunken boys from a Bacchic revel, made in Athens 140–150 CE

== Broadway Museum and Art Gallery ==
In 2013 a museum was opened in the 17th-century "Tudor House" at Broadway, Worcestershire, in the Cotswolds, in partnership with the Ashmolean Museum. In 2017 the museum became known as the Broadway Museum and Art Gallery. The collection includes paintings and furniture from the founding collections of the Ashmolean Museum, given by Elias Ashmole to the University of Oxford in 1683, and local exhibits expand upon elements of the timeline of the village.

== Major exhibitions ==
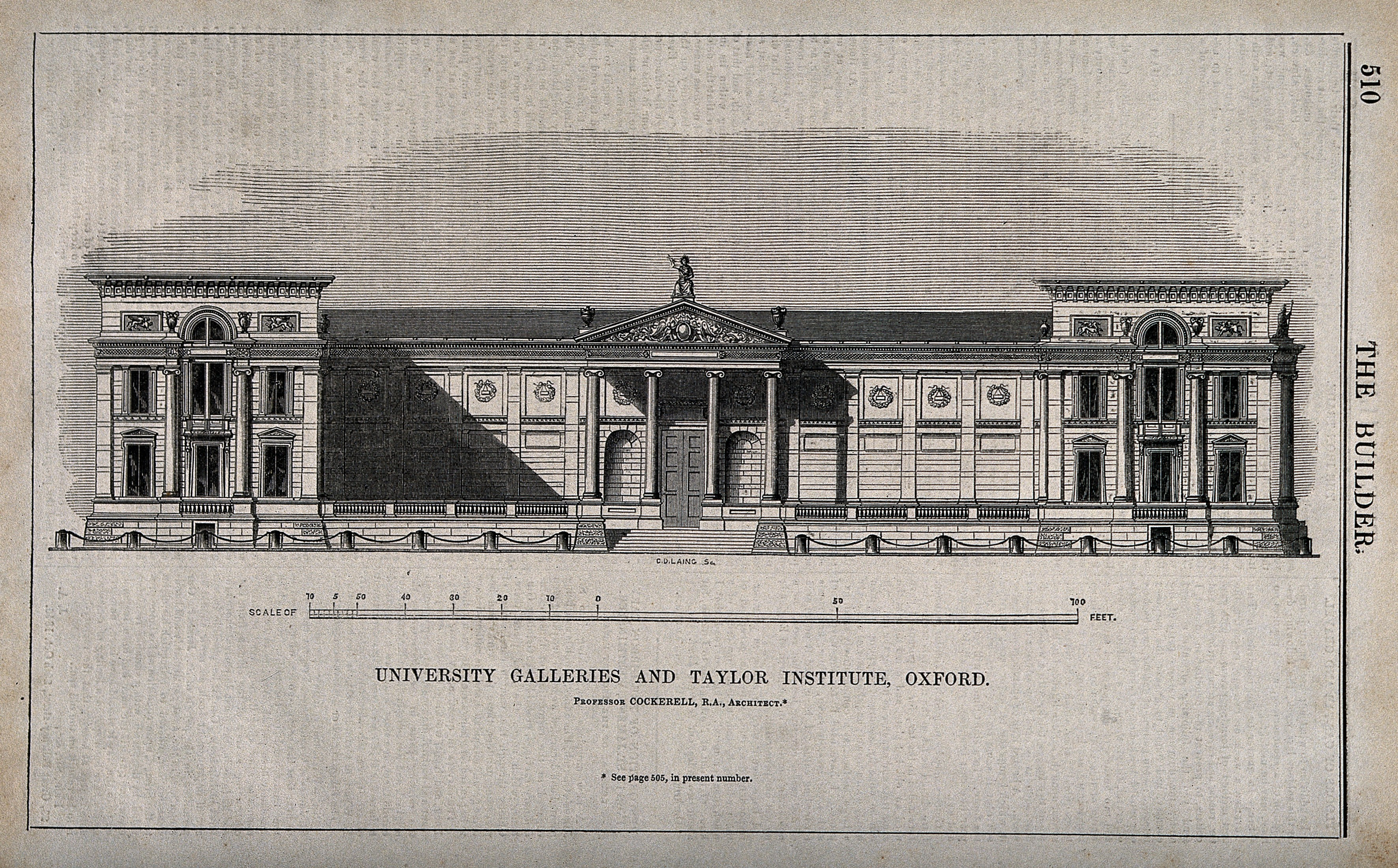
Wood-engraving of the Ashmolean c. 1845

Current planned exhibitions include:

- In Bloom: How Plants Changed Our World: This exhibition opened at the Ashmolean on 19 March 2026 and will run until 16 August 2026. The exhibition explores the UK's relationship with flowers from across the globe through art, history, and humanity's changing relationship with the natural world.

Major exhibitions in recent years include:

- Labyrinth: Knossos, Myth and Reality: This exhibition opened at the Ashmolean in February 2023 and will be open until late July 2023.
- Pre-Raphaelites: Drawings & Watercolours: This exhibition, initially shown for 5 weeks in 2021, was re-mounted in 2022 for a longer run, opening in July. It is drawn from the Ashmolean's own collection of Pre-Raphaelite drawings and watercolours.
- Pissarro: Father of Impressionism: Open from February until June 2022, this exhibition included artworks drawn from the Ashmolean's collections as well as international loans, spanning Camille Pissarro's entire career.
- Tokyo: Art and Photography: Open from July 2021 until January 2022, this exhibition included artworks from the Ashmolean's collection as well as loans from Japan and new commissions by contemporary artists. It included woodblock prints by Hokusai and Hiroshige, photography of Moriyama Daido and Ninagawa Mika.
- Pre-Raphaelites: Drawings & Watercolours: Open in May and June 2021, this exhibition was drawn from the Ashmolean's own collection of Pre-Raphaelite drawings and watercolours. The exhibition was curated by British art historian Christiana Payne.
- Young Rembrandt: Open from August until November 2020, this exhibition was delayed due to the COVID-19 pandemic, and featured more than 120 of Rembrandt's paintings, drawings and prints from international and private collections. It focused on the first decade of Rembrandt's work, from 1624 to 1634, and included his early paintings Jeremiah Lamenting the Destruction of Jerusalem, Self-Portrait in a Gorget, Rembrandt Laughing, Judas Repentant, Returning the Pieces of Silver, Portrait of Jacques de Gheyn III, and History Painting. The exhibition was the subject of a BBC television documentary, in its 2020 Museums in Quarantine series.
- Last Supper in Pompeii: Open from July 2019 until January 2020, this exhibition explored what the people of the ancient Roman city of Pompeii loved to eat and drink. Many of the objects, on loan from Naples Museum and Pompeii, had never before left Italy.
- Jeff Koons at the Ashmolean: Open from February until June 2019, this exhibition featured 17 major works by the American artist Jeff Koons, 14 of which had never been on display in the UK before. They included some of his most well-known series such as Equilibrium, Banality, Antiquity and his recent Gazing Ball paintings and sculptures. In the galleries of the museum, where the collections range from prehistory to the present, Jeff Koons's work was 'in conversation' with the history of art and ideas which has been his focus over the past four decades. The exhibition was curated by Koons and Norman Rosenthal.
- Spellbound: Magic, Ritual & Witchcraft: Open from August 2018 until January 2019, this exhibition explored the history of magic over eight centuries. On display were 180 objects from 12th-century Europe to newly commissioned contemporary artworks.
- America's Cool Modernism: O'Keeffe to Hopper: Open from March until July 2018 this major exhibition of works by American artists in the early 20th-century included over 80 paintings, photographs and prints, and the first American avant-garde film, Manhatta. Many of the paintings had never before travelled outside the US.
- Imagining the Divine: Art and the Rise of World Religions: Open from October 2017 until February 2018 this exhibition explored Buddhism, Christianity, Hinduism, Islam and Judaism, and was the first to look at the art of these five world religions as they spread across continents in the first millennium CE.
- Raphael: The Drawings: Open from June 2017 until September 2017 this exhibition brought together over a hundred works by Raphael from international collections and aimed to transform public understanding of Raphael through a focus on the immediacy and expressiveness of his drawing.
- Degas to Picasso: Creating Modernism in France: Open from February 2017 until May 2017, and featuring works by Matisse, Manet, Chagall, Braque, Delacroix, Renoir, Metzinger, Degas, Léger and Picasso, this exhibition told the story of the rise of Modernism through works from a private collection that had never been seen in Britain before.
- Power and Protection: Islamic Art and the Supernatural: Open from October 2016 until January 2017, this was the first major exhibition to explore the supernatural in the art of the Islamic world. The exhibition included objects and works of art from the 12th to the 20th century, from Morocco to China, which have been used as sources of guidance and protection in the dramatic events of human history. These include dream-books, talismanic charts and amulets.
- Storms, War and Shipwrecks: Treasures from the Sicilian Seas: Open from June until September 2016, this exhibition explored the roots of Sicily's multi-cultural heritage through the discoveries made by underwater archaeologists – from chance finds to excavated shipwrecks. The exhibition also featured what has been described as a "flat pack" Byzantine church interior, intended for assembly at its destination, with marble items raised from a wreck off the southeast coast of Sicily in the 1960s by archaeologist Gerhard Kapitan.
- Andy Warhol: Works from the Hall Collection: Open from February until May 2016, this exhibition featured over a hundred works, by Andy Warhol, from the Hall Collection (US), plus loans of films from The Andy Warhol Museum, Pittsburgh. Curated by Sir Norman Rosenthal, the exhibition spanned Warhol's entire output, from iconic pieces of the 1960s Pop pioneer to the experimental works of his last decade.
- Elizabeth Price: A Restoration: Open from March until May 2016, this two-screen video installation by British artist Elizabeth Price was a newly commissioned work in response to the collections and archives of the Ashmolean and Pitt Rivers museums, in partnership with the Ruskin School of Drawing and Fine Art, and funded by the 2013 Contemporary Art Society Award. The main focus was the records of Arthur Evans's excavation of the Cretan city of Knossos.
- Drawing in Venice: Titian to Canaletto: Open from October 2015 until January 2016, this exhibition featured a hundred drawings from The Uffizi Gallery in Florence, the Ashmolean, and Christ Church, Oxford. It was based on new research tracing continuities in Venetian drawing over three centuries, from around 1500 down to the foundation of the first academy of art in Venice in 1750. The exhibition also featured 20 works on paper and canvas by contemporary artist Jenny Saville, produced in response to the Venetian drawings in the exhibition.
- Great British Drawings: An exhibition open from March until August 2015 showing more than one hundred British drawings and watercolours from the Ashmolean's collection, spanning three hundred years.
- An Elegant Society: Adam Buck, artist in the age of Jane Austen: Open from July until October 2015 this exhibition explored the work of Adam Buck, Irish Regency era portrait and miniature painter.
- Love Bites: Caricatures by James Gillray: An exhibition in 2015 to mark the 200th anniversary of the death of British caricaturist James Gillray (1757–1815). The caricatures on display were from the collection of New College, Oxford.
- William Blake: Apprentice and Master: Open from December 2014 until March 2015, this exhibition celebrated the work of William Blake.
- Discovering Tutankhamun: a special exhibition, open from July until November 2014, explored Howard Carter's excavation of the tomb of Tutankhamun in 1922. Original records, drawings and photographs from the Griffith Institute were on display.
- The Eye of the Needle: English Embroideries from the Feller Collection: a special exhibition, open from August until October 2014, of 17th-century embroideries from the Feller Collection, together with examples from the Ashmolean's own holdings.
- Cézanne and the Modern: a special exhibition, open from March to June 2014, displaying Impressionist and Post-Impressionist paintings and sketches from the Henry and Rose Pearlman Collection
- Francis Bacon / Henry Moore: Flesh and Bone: a special exhibition, open from September 2013 until July 2014, displaying paintings by Francis Bacon and sculptures and drawings by Henry Moore.
- Stradivarius: a special exhibition, open from June until August 2013, exploring the life and work of Antonio Stradivari. It was the first time twenty-one of his instruments, from guitar to cello to violin, were on display together in the UK.
- Master Drawings: a special exhibition, open from May until August 2013, displaying a selection of the Ashmolean's on western art collection. The exhibition surveyed drawings of all types by some of the biggest names in art history, including Leonardo, Michelangelo and Raphael, as well as Gwen John, David Hockney and Antony Gormley.
- Xu Bing: Landscape Landscript: a special exhibition of the work of Xu Bing, open from February until May 2013. It was the Ashmolean's first major exhibition of contemporary art.

== Keepers and Directors ==
Keepers
Name	From	To
Robert Plot	1683	1690
Edward Lhuyd	1690	1709
David Parry	1709	1714
John Whiteside	1714	1729
George Shepheard	1730	1731
Joseph Andrews	1731	1732
George Huddesford	1732	1755
William Huddesford	1755	1772
William Sheffield	1772	1795
William Lloyd	1796	1815
Thomas Dunbar	1815	1822
William Philipps	1822	1823
John Shute Duncan	1823	1826
Philip Bury Duncan	1826	1854
John Phillips	1854	1870
John Henry Parker	1870	1884
Sir Arthur Evans	1884	1908
David George Hogarth	1909	1927
Edward Thurlow Leeds	1928	1945
Sir Karl Parker	1945	1962
Robert W. Hamilton	1962	1972

Beginning in 1973, the position of Keeper was superseded by that of Director:

Directors
Name	From	To
Sir David Piper	1973	1985
Professor Sir Christopher White	1985	1997
Roger Moorey (acting)	1997	1998
Christopher Brown	1998	2014
Alexander Sturgis	2014	

== Notable people ==
=== Current keepers ===
- Christopher Howgego, Keeper of the Heberden Coin Room
- Mallica Kumbera Landrus, Keeper of Eastern Art
- Liam McNamara, Keeper of Antiquities
- Dr. John Chu, Keeper of Western Art

=== Former staff ===
- Michael Metcalf, former Keeper of the Heberden Coin Room
- Joan Crowfoot Payne, archaeologist and Cataloguer of the Egyptian and Nubian collectors (1957–1979)
- Jon Whiteley, former Assistant Keeper of Western Art
- Susan Sherratt, former Assistant Curator and Honorary Research Assistant to the Arthur Evans Archive
- Andrew Sherratt, former Assistant Keeper of Antiquities in the Ashmolean Museum
- Catherine Whistler, former Keeper of Western Art

== In popular culture ==
=== Books ===
- The Ashmolean Museum is a minor location within the book Babel, or the Necessity of Violence.

=== Graphic novels ===
- The 21st book in the Belgian graphic novel series Blake and Mortimer, titled The Oath of the Five Lords, centres around a series of burglaries at the Ashmolean and their connection to T. E. Lawrence.

=== Television ===
- The Alfred Jewel was the inspiration for the Inspector Morse episode "The Wolvercote Tongue" (1988), in which the museum's interior was used as a set.
- The Ashmolean also figures prominently in several episodes of the successor series Lewis, particularly the episode "Point of Vanishing" where the painting The Hunt in the Forest (c. 1470) is a key plot element; the characters visit the painting at the museum and are instructed on its features by an art expert before solving the case.

== Theft ==
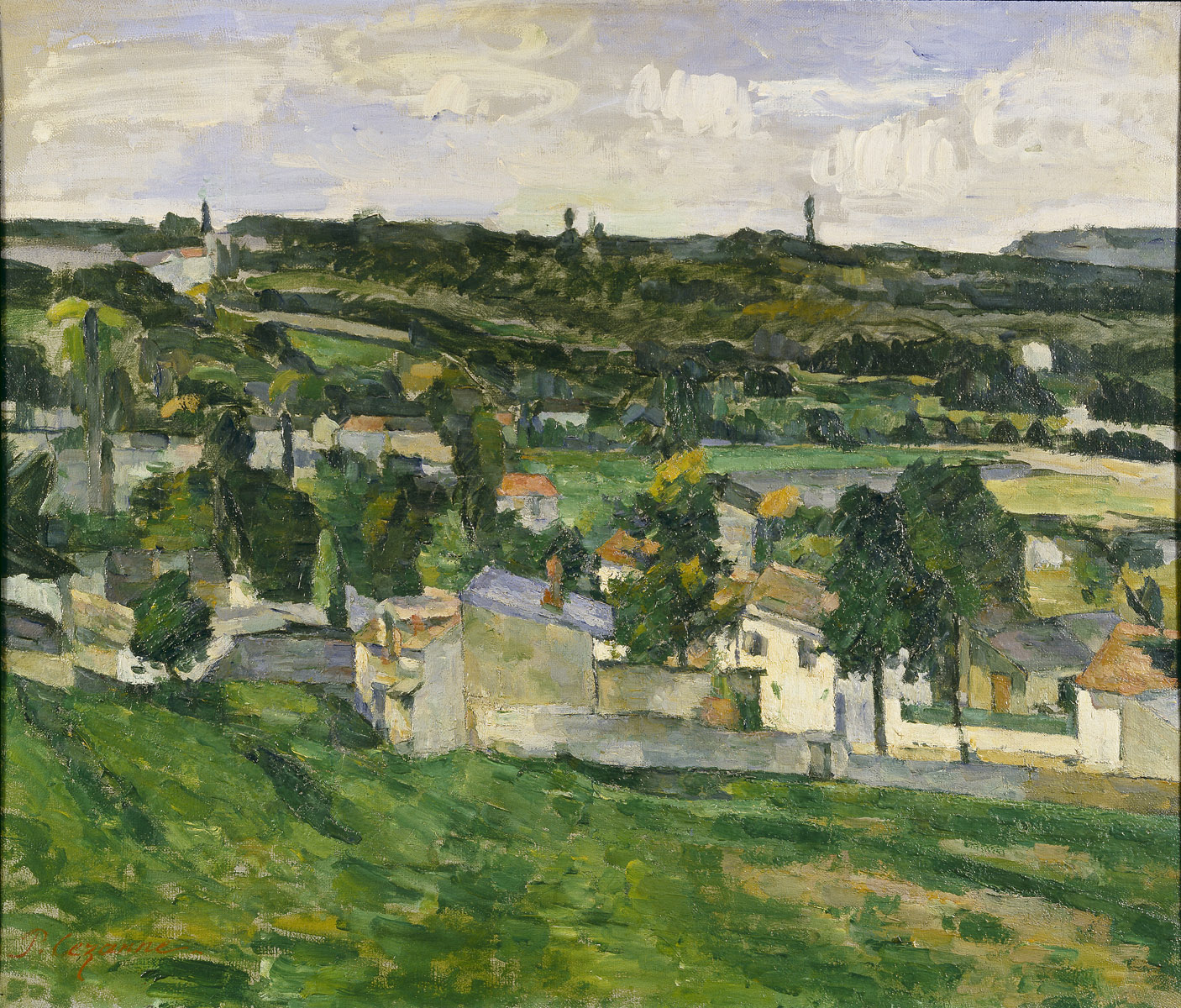
View of Auvers-sur-Oise by Paul Cézanne

On 31 December 1999, during the fireworks that accompanied the celebration of the millennium, thieves used scaffolding on an adjoining building to climb onto the roof of the museum and stole Cézanne's landscape painting View of Auvers-sur-Oise. Valued at £3 million, the painting has been described as an important work illustrating the transition from early to mature Cézanne painting. As the thieves ignored other works in the same room, and the stolen Cézanne has not been offered for sale, it is speculated that this was a case of an artwork stolen to order. The Cézanne has not been recovered and is one of the FBI's Top Ten Art Crimes.

In 2010 several of the Egypt Exploration Society's Oxyrhynchus Papyri held by the museum were allegedly stolen from the collection and sold to the American Museum of the Bible.

=== Repatriation of artefacts ===
In 2024, the museum agreed to return a 500-year-old bronze sculpture of the Hindu poet and saint Thirumangai Alvar that it had purchased at an auction at Sotheby's in 1967, after the Indian High Commission in the United Kingdom filed a claim stating that the item was stolen from a temple in Tamil Nadu in 1957.

== See also ==
- Museums of the University of Oxford
- Museum of Oxford
- Oxford University Museum of Natural History
- Bate Collection of Musical Instruments
- Christ Church Picture Gallery
- Donation by Sultan bin Abdul-Aziz Al Saud
