= Travels of Anacharsis the Younger in Greece =

Fictional travelogue by Jean-Jacques Barthélemy

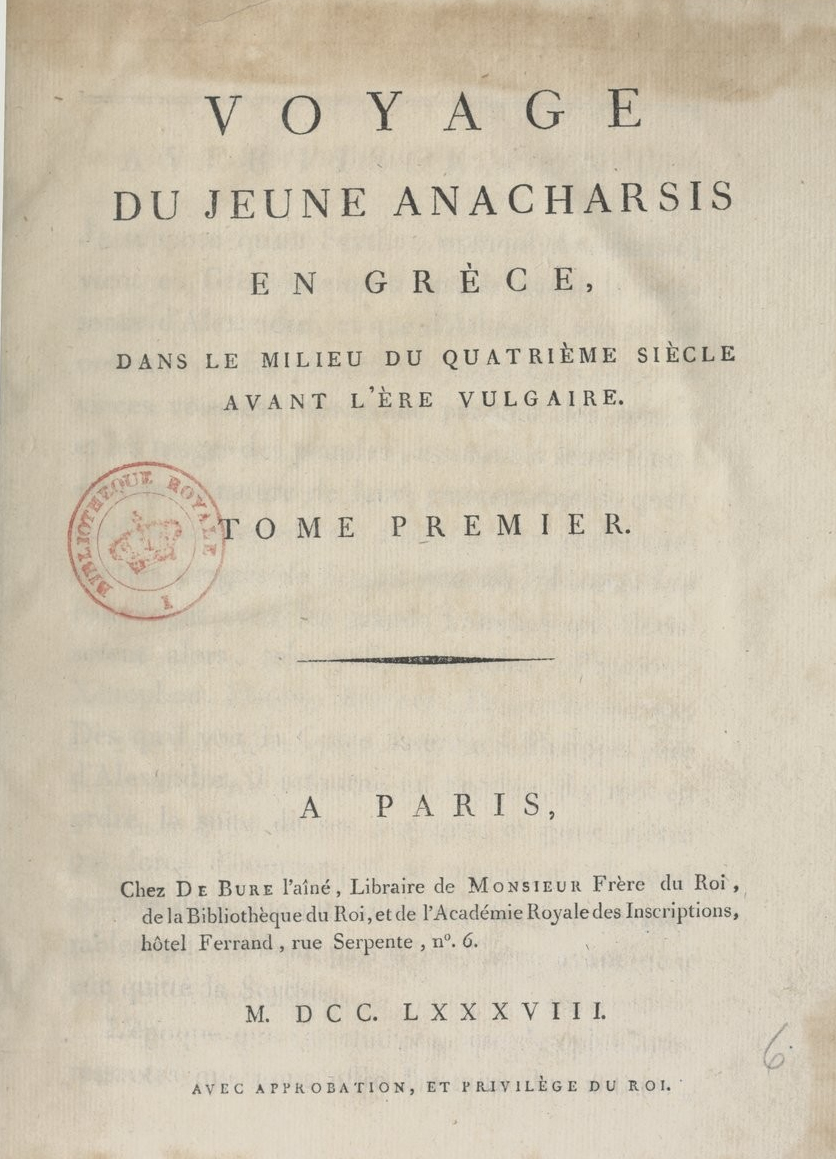
Frontispiece of the 1788 edition of Travels of Anacharsis the Younger in Greece

Travels of Anacharsis the Younger in Greece (French: Voyage du jeune Anacharsis en Grèce) was a fictional work about the travels of the Scythian named Anacharsis in Greece in the middle of the 4th century BCE, written by Jean-Jacques Barthélemy and published in 1788.

== Description ==
Jean-Jacques Barthélemy's book was a fanciful but learned imaginary travel journal, one of the first historical novels, which a modern scholar has called "the encyclopedia of the new cult of the antique" in the late 18th century.

The original 1788 French edition of the Travels of Anacharsis was published in four volumes with a supplementary volume of maps and reproductions of coins. The novel became hugely popular, and over the next century, it appeared in about eighty editions, including adaptations for young people. It was translated into English, Spanish, German, Italian, Danish, Dutch, modern Greek, and even Armenian.

The hero of the book is a young Scythian named Anacharsis, a descendant of, and having the same name as the famous philosopher Anacharsis, who traveled from his homeland on the northern shores of the Black Sea to Athens in the early 6th century BC. The hero of the novel also travels to Greece and, after making a tour of the republics, colonies and islands of Greece, he returns to his native country and, in his old age, writes the story of his travels.

In the advertisement to the work (included in the 1817 edition), Barthélmey summarized his intent:

"I imagine a Scythian named Anacharsis, to arrive in Greece some years before the birth of Alexander; and that from Athens, the usual place of his residence, he makes several excursions into the neighboring provinces; everywhere observing the manners and customs of the inhabitants, being present at their festivals, and studying the nature of their governments; sometimes dedicating his leisure to inquiries relative to the progress of the human mind, and sometimes conversing with the great men who flourished at that time; with Epaminondas, Phocion, Xenophon, Plato, Aristotle, Demosthenes, &c. As soon as he has seen Greece enslaved by Philip, the father of Alexander, he returns into Scythia, where he puts in order an account of his travels… I have chosen to write a narrative of travels rather than a history, because in such a narrative all is scenery and action; and because circumstantial details may be entered into which are not permitted to the historian."

The Travels of Anacharsis covers the years 363-337 B.C.E. The chronology of the work is as follows (all years below are B.C.E.):

CHAP. I - Anacharsis departs from Scythia in April 363.

CHAP. VI - After staying some time at Byzantium, Lesbos and Thebes, he arrives at Athens on March 13, 362.

CHAP. IX. - He goes to Corinth, and returns to Athens on April 1, 362.

CHAP. XII, etc. - He describes the city of Athens, and gives the result of his inquiries relative to the government, manners and religion of the Athenians - 362.

CHAP. XXII - He sets out for Phocis in April 361.

CHAP. XXIII, etc. - He returns to Athens and after having related several events that occurred from the year 361 to the year 357, he treats of several particulars relative to the customs of the Athenians, the history of their sciences, etc.

CHAP. XXXIV, etc. - He departs for Boeotia, and the northern provinces of Greece - 357.

CHAP. XXXVII - He passes the winter between 357 and 356 at Athens, then proceeds to the southern provinces of Greece in March 356.

CHAP. XXXVIII - He is present at the celebration of the Olympic Games - July 356.

CHAP. LIV, etc. - He returns to Athens, where he continues his usual researches.

CHAP. LX - He relates the remarkable events that happened in Greece and Sicily from the year 357 to the year 354.

CHAP. LXI - He sets out for Egypt and Persia in 354. During his absence, which continues eleven years until 343, he receives several letters from Athens, which bring him information relative to the affairs of Greece, the enterprises of Philip, and various interesting facts.

CHAP. LXII - On his return from Persia, he goes to Mitylene, where he finds Aristotle, who communicates to him his Treatise on Government, of which Anacharsis makes an abridgment - 343

CHAP. LXIII, etc. - He returns to Athens, where he employs himself in his usual researches - 343

CHAP. LXXII, etc. - He makes a voyage to the coast of Asia, and several of the islands of the Aegean sea - 342

CHAP. LXXVI - He is present at the celebration of the festivals of Delos - 341

CHAP LXXX - He returns to Athens and continues his inquiries.

CHAP. LXXXII - After the battle of Chaeronea, he returns to Scythia - 337

Although the Anacharsis has been described as a historical novel, the essayist Carlo Ginzburg points out that it is really more a combination of fiction and erudition - a systematic antiquarian treatise with a historical narrative. As stated in his preface (above), Barthélemy chose to highlight the more mundane, everyday activities, settings and objects that history itself often overlooks. But as Ginzburg notes, the novel is “stuffed with erudition, an undigested miscellany.” The narrative of the work is disjointed – the insights are never profound and the Scythian hero seldom penetrates much below the surface. Much of the book is bogged down in description and in reality often reads more like an encyclopedia.

Nevertheless, the book was widely popular in its time and helped stir an interest in ancient Greek culture. Barthelemy, who was a classical scholar and an enthusiast for Greek antiquities, poured his extensive knowledge and research into the book to describe the laws, government, religion, philosophy, art and antiquities of ancient Greece, and he cited all his sources in exhaustive footnotes. However, as the nineteenth century grew to a close, Anacharsis lost its appeal - it began to appear antiquated and consequently fell into oblivion. Today, it is pretty much forgotten.

== In popular culture ==
In the first chapter of Madame Bovary by Gustave Flaubert, Charles Bovary is described as reading the Anacharsis while at school in Rouen: “Every Thursday evening he wrote a long letter to his mother, with red ink and three sealing-wafers; after which he went over his history notes or picked up an old volume of the Travels of Anacharsis that was lying about in the school-room.”

As the essayist Carlo Ginzburg points out: "From the very first page of Flaubert’s Madame Bovary, Charles, the future husband of the protagonist, is presented as mediocre and ridiculous… Every slight detail that concerns him, including the mention of ‘the old volume’ of the philosopher Anacharsis read at boarding school at Rouen, has something awkward and stuffy about it. ... “The old volume’ of Anacharsis... was frayed from use. But for Flaubert it was also a relic from the past: testimony to a taste and a world gone forever.”

== Later influence ==
The novel had a large impact on the growth of philhellenism in France, Europe and the United States: the book went through many editions, was reprinted in the United States and was translated into German and other languages. It later inspired European sympathy for the Greek War of Independence and spawned sequels and imitations throughout the 19th century. According to a contemporary English literary review:

"The travels of Anacharsis are the produce of an intimate acquaintance with the original Greek writers, and comprize the most instructive details concerning the political, as well as the literary state of that people, during their most brilliant period"

— The Monthly review, 1799.

The work also contained numerous maps and engravings of high quality, made by geographer and cartographist Jean-Denis Barbié Du Bocage (1760–1825).

An important related edition is that of the Maps, plans, views, and coins, illustrative of the Travels of Anacharsis the younger in Greece by engraver Barbié du Bocage, published in English in 1832.

== Plates ==
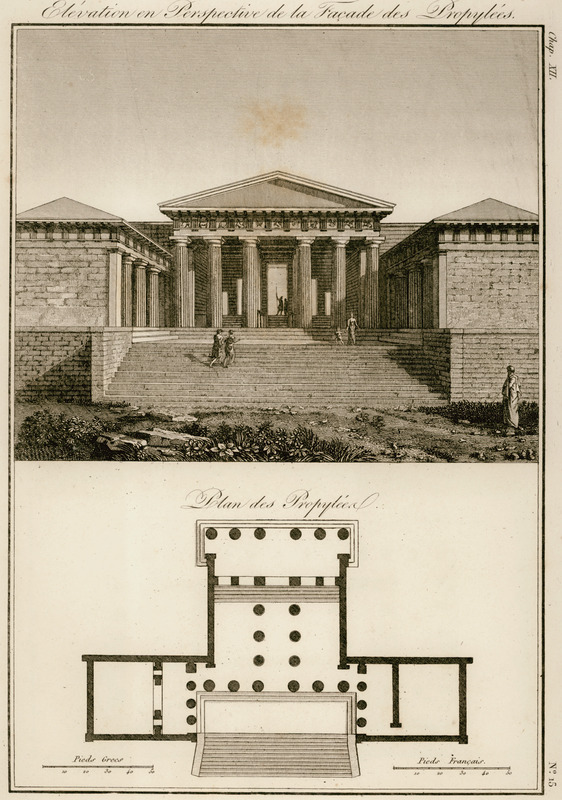
The Propylaea in the Acropolis, 1832.

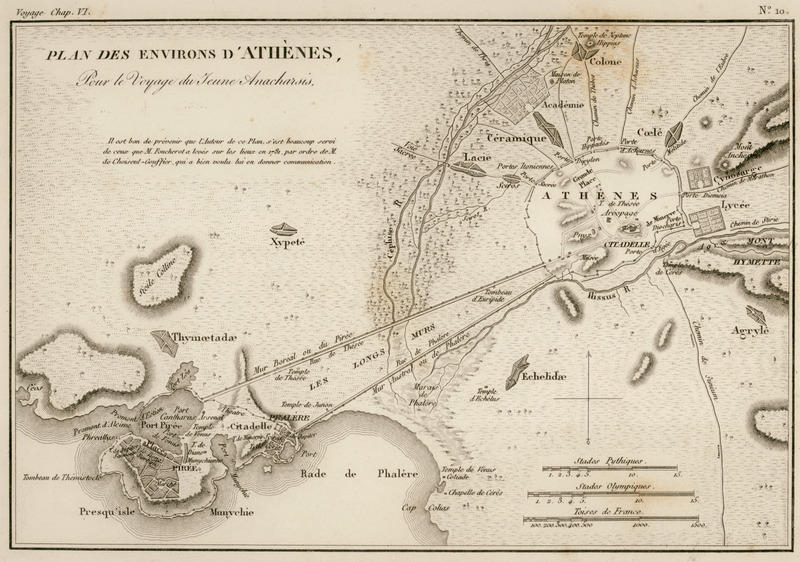
Plan of Athens

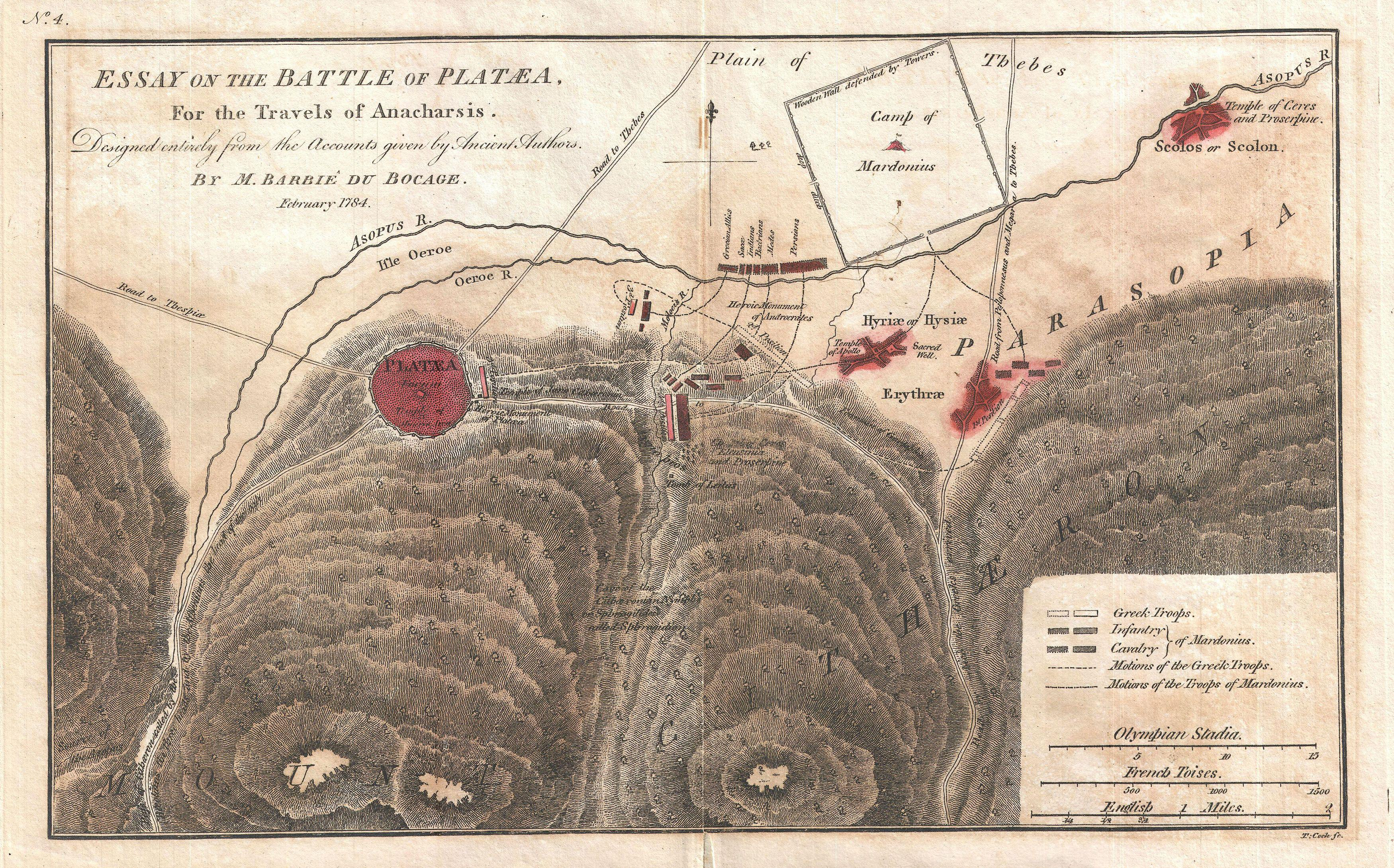
Plan of the Battle of Plataea

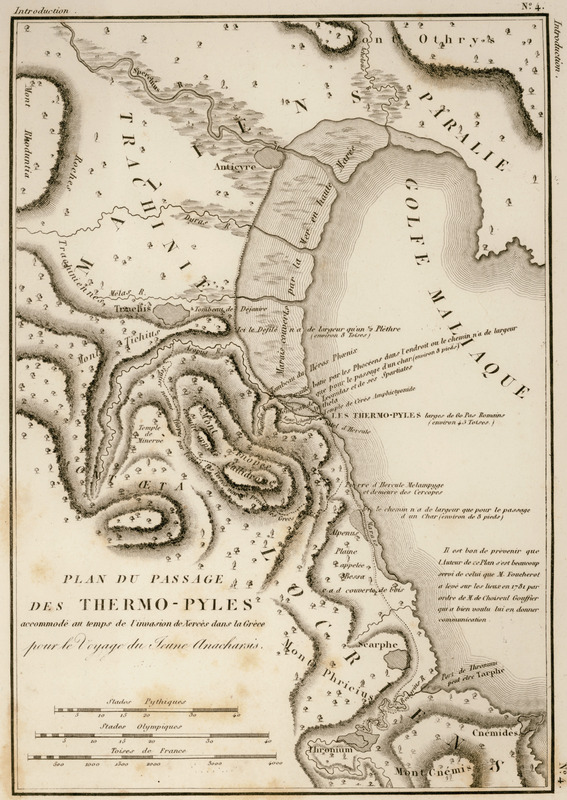
Plan of the Thermopylae at the time of Xerxes I

== Publications ==
=== 1788 (in French) ===
Book 1 Book 2 Book 3 Book 4 Maps and engravings

=== 1843 (in French) ===
Book 1 Book 2
