= Claude Gros de Boze =

French numismatist (1680–1753)

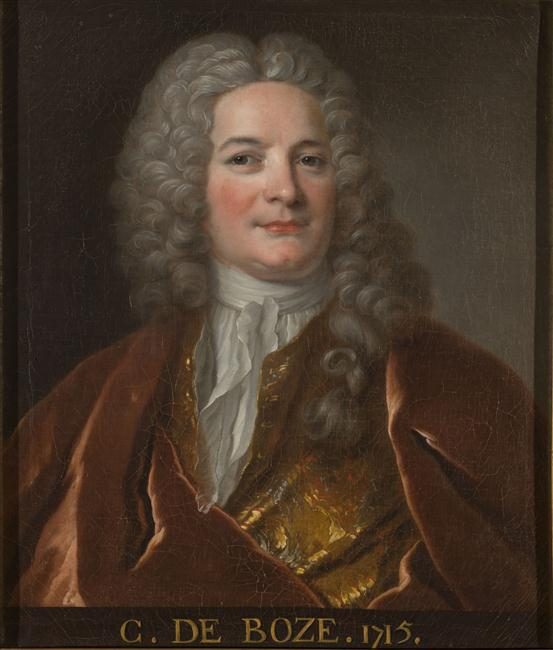
Claude Gros de Boze

Claude Gros de Boze (28 January 1680 – 10 September 1753) was a French scholar and numismatist.

== Biography ==
De Boze was born at Lyon, Lyonnais. Studying in Lyon and Paris, and settling in the latter around 1700, he gained the support of Nicolas-Joseph Foucault and thus (in 1705) became a pensionary of the Académie des inscriptions et belles-lettres. In 1706 he was made the Académie des inscriptions' perpetual secretary and in 1715 he was elected to the Académie Française. In 1719 he was made curator or garde of the Cabinet des médailles et antiques, a post he held until his death. With his student and assistant Jean-Jacques Barthélemy he developed a method of classifying medals, and in 1723 completed an "inventory of medals, engraved stones and other antique rarities in the Cabinet du roy". In 1727 he was elected a member of the Académie royale de peinture et de sculpture, and on 6 April 1749 even became a Fellow of the British Royal Society. He died, aged 73, in Paris.

== Main publications ==
- Médailles sur les principaux événements du règne de Louis le Grand, avec des explications historiques par l'Académie royale des Médailles et des Inscriptions (1702)
- Traité historique sur le jubilé des Juifs (1702)
- Dissertation sur le Janus des anciens et sur quelques médailles qui y ont rapport (1705)
- Dissertation sur le culte que les Anciens ont rendu à la déesse de la Santé (1705)
- Explication d'une inscription antique trouvée depuis peu à Lyon, où sont décrites les particularitez des sacrifices que les Anciens appelloient « Tauroboles » (1705)
- Histoire de l'Académie royale des inscriptions et belles-lettres depuis son établissement jusqu'à présent (14 volumes) (1718–72)
- Démétrius Soter, ou le Rétablissement de la famille royale sur le trône de Syrie (1746)
