= Jean-Jacques Barthélemy =

French writer and numismatist (1716–1795)

Abbot Jean-Jacques Barthélemy
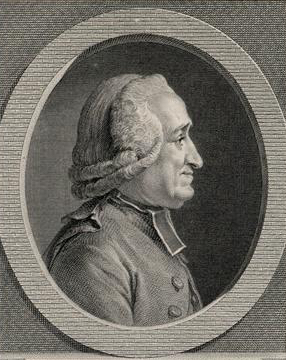
- Born: 20 January 1716; Cassis, Provence, France
- Died: 30 April 1795 (aged 79); Paris, France
- Known for: Decipherment of the Palmyrene alphabet and the Phoenician alphabet Author of Travels of Anacharsis the younger in Greece; Member of the Académie française
- Title: Abbé

Jean-Jacques Barthélemy (20 January 1716 – 30 April 1795) was a French Catholic clergyman, archaeologist, numismatologist and scholar who became the first person to decipher an extinct language. He deciphered the Palmyrene alphabet in 1754 and the Phoenician alphabet in 1758.

== Early years ==
Barthélemy was born at Cassis, in Provence, and began his classical studies at the College of Oratory in Marseille. He took up philosophy and theology at the Jesuits' college, and finally attended the seminary of the Lazarists. While studying for the priesthood, which he intended to join, he devoted much attention to oriental languages, and was introduced by a friend to the study of classical antiquities, and particularly to the field of numismatics.

== Career ==
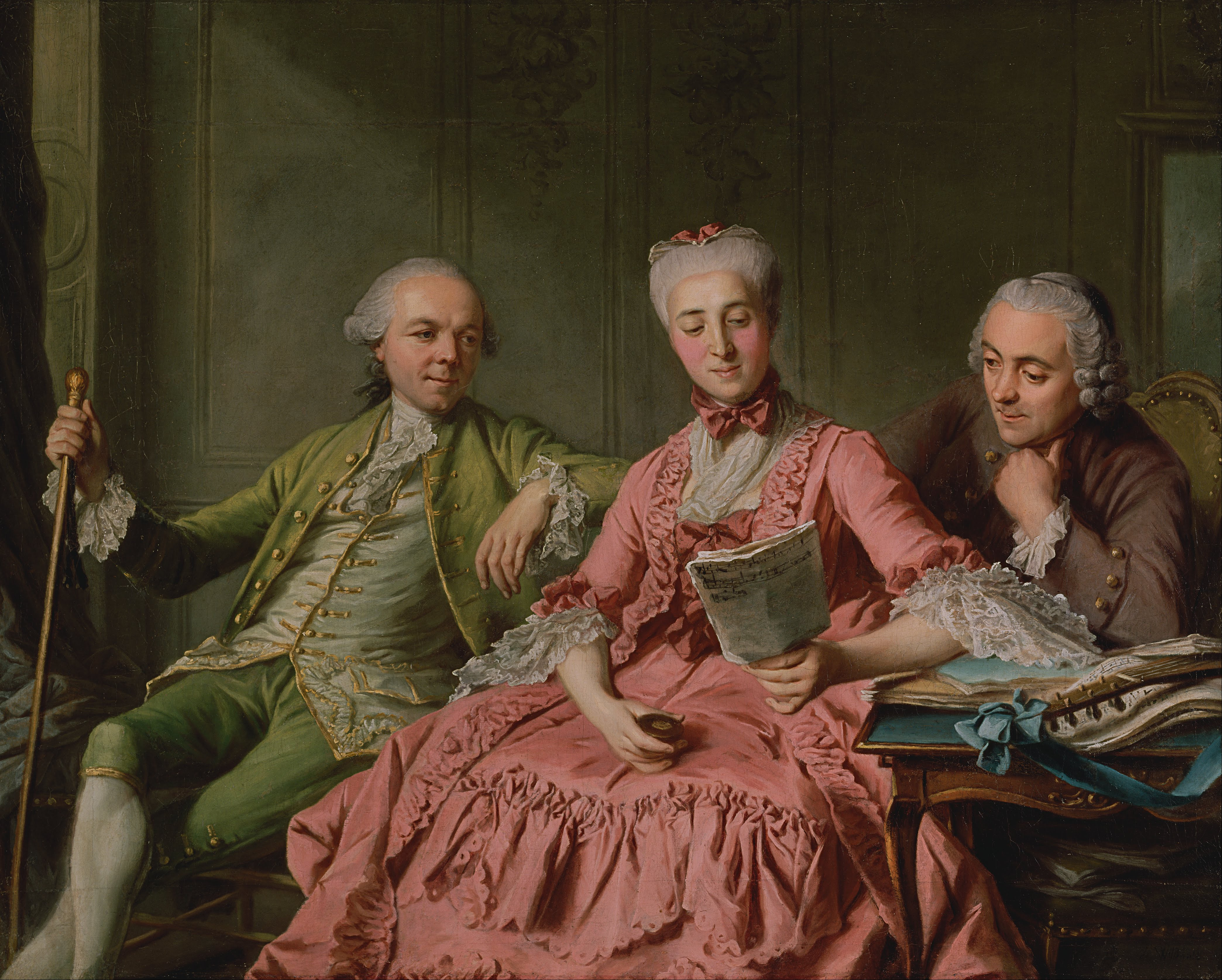
The duc de Choiseul, together with Madame de Brionne and Abbé Barthélemy (right), circa 1775.

In 1744, he went to Paris with a letter of introduction to Claude Gros de Boze, Perpetual Secretary of the Académie des inscriptions et belles-lettres and Keeper of the Royal Collection of Medals. He became assistant to de Boze and in 1753 succeeded him in this post, remaining in this position until the Revolution. During his term of office he nearly doubled the size of the collection.

In 1755, he accompanied the French ambassador, the duc de Choiseul to Italy, where he spent three years in archaeological research. Choiseul had a great regard for Barthélemy, and on his return to France, Barthélemy became an inmate of his house, and received valuable preferments from his patron. In June 1755 he was elected a Fellow of the Royal Society of London. In 1789, after the publication of his Travels of Anacharsis the Younger in Greece, he was elected a member of the Académie française.

During the Revolution Abbot Barthélemy was arrested (September 1793) as an aristocrat and confined in a prison for a few days. The Committee of Public Safety, however, were no sooner informed by the Duchess of Choiseul of the arrest than they gave orders for his immediate release, and in 1793 he was nominated librarian of the Bibliothèque Nationale. He refused this post but resumed his old functions as keeper of medals, and enriched the national collection by many valuable accessions. Having been despoiled of his fortune by the Revolution, he died in poverty.

=== Decipherment ===
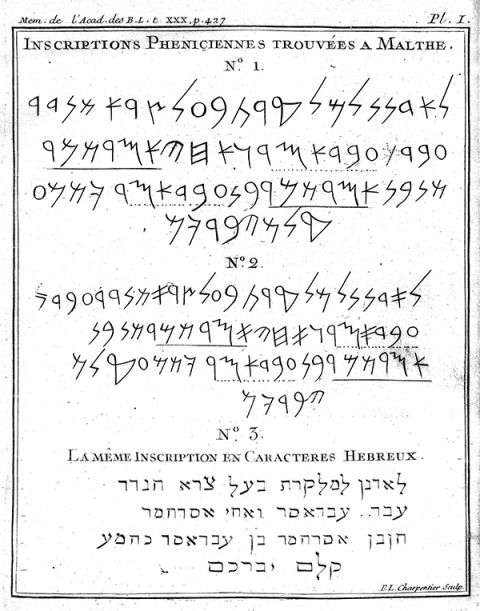
Jean-Jacques Barthélemy, « Réflexions sur quelques monumens phéniciens et sur les alphabets qui en résultent », Mémoires de l’Académie des Belles Lettres, t. XXX, 1758, pl. I. These are the Phoenician transcriptions of the two Cippi of Melqart inscriptions, with one transliteration.

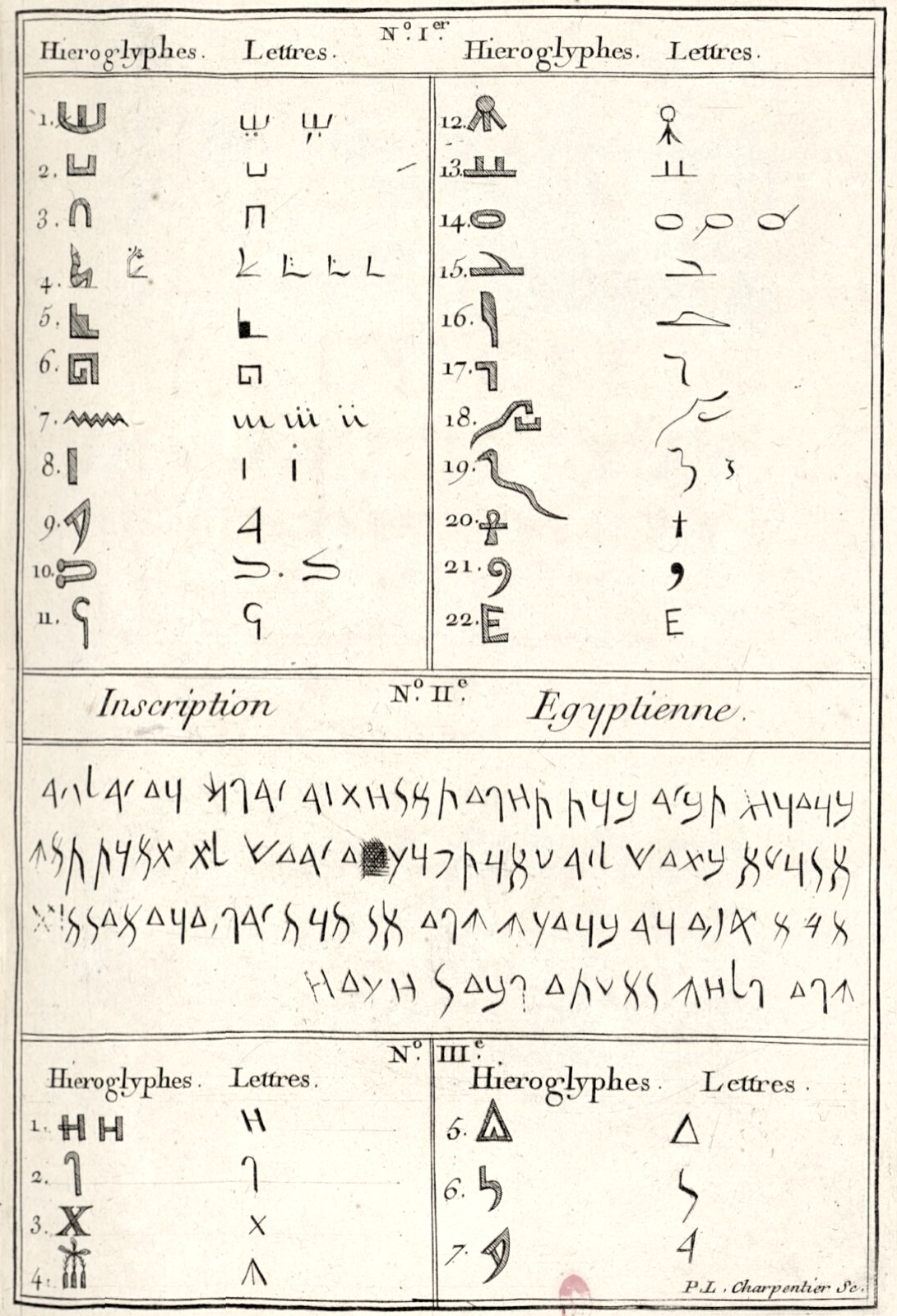
Anne Claude de Caylus and Jean-Jacques Barthélemy identified that non-hieroglyphic cursive Egyptian scripts seemed to consist in alphabetical letters graphically derived from hieroglyphs, in Recueil d'antiquités égyptiennes, 1752. This insight was published in English in The Divine Legation of Moses by William Warburton in 1765.

Abbot Barthélemy was the first to successfully decipher ancient oriental extinct languages, first the Palmyrene alphabet in 1754, followed by the Phoenician alphabet in 1758.

==== Palmyrene alphabet ====
Examples of Palmyrene inscriptions were printed as far back as 1616, but accurate copies of Palmyrene/Greek bilingual inscriptions were not available until 1753, with the publication of Les Ruines De Palmyre by Robert Wood and James Dawkins. The Palmyrene alphabet was deciphered in 1754, literally overnight, by Abbé Jean-Jacques Barthélemy using these new, accurate copies of bilingual inscriptions. He relied essentially on the transcription of proper names to identify the value of each letter.

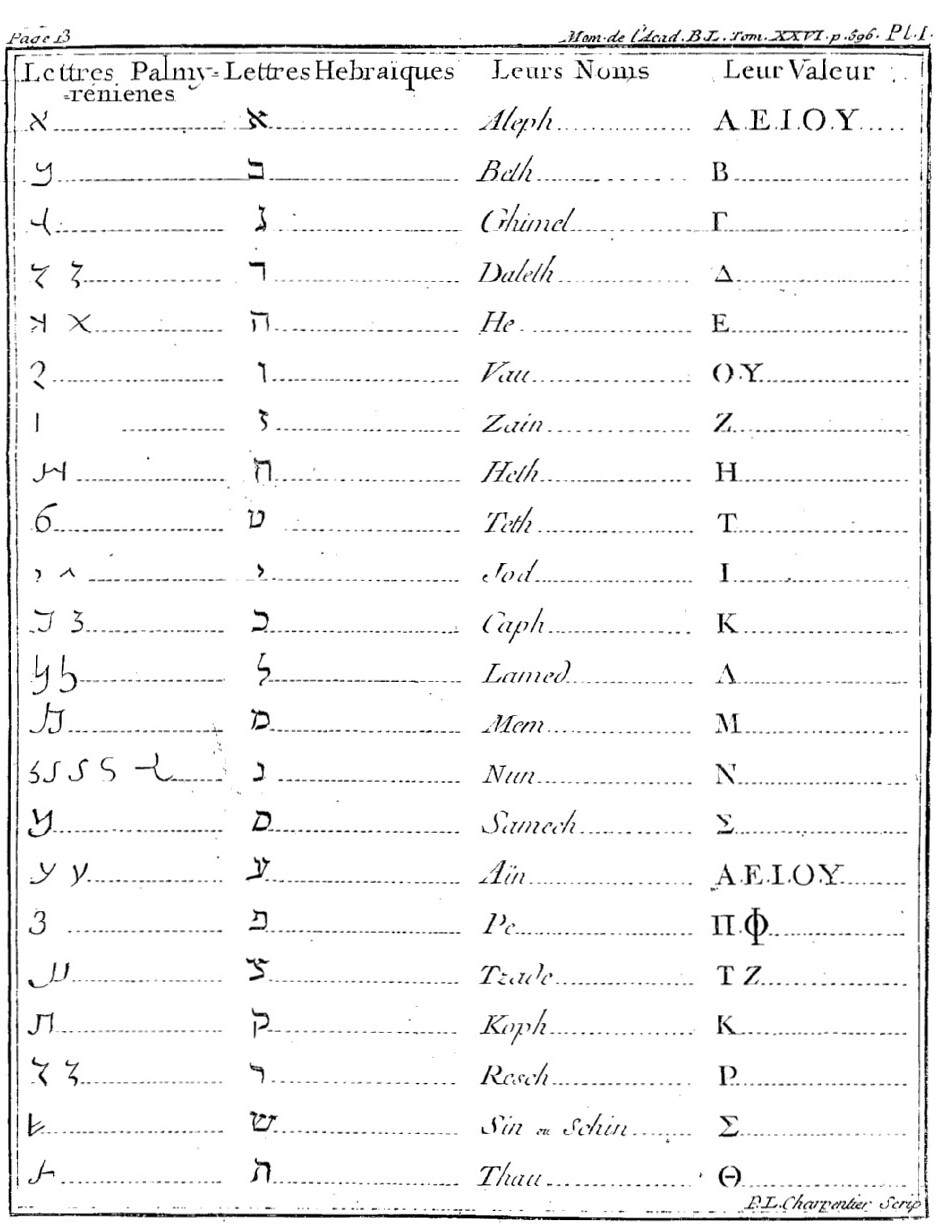
Palmyrian alphabet, in Barthélémy, 1754

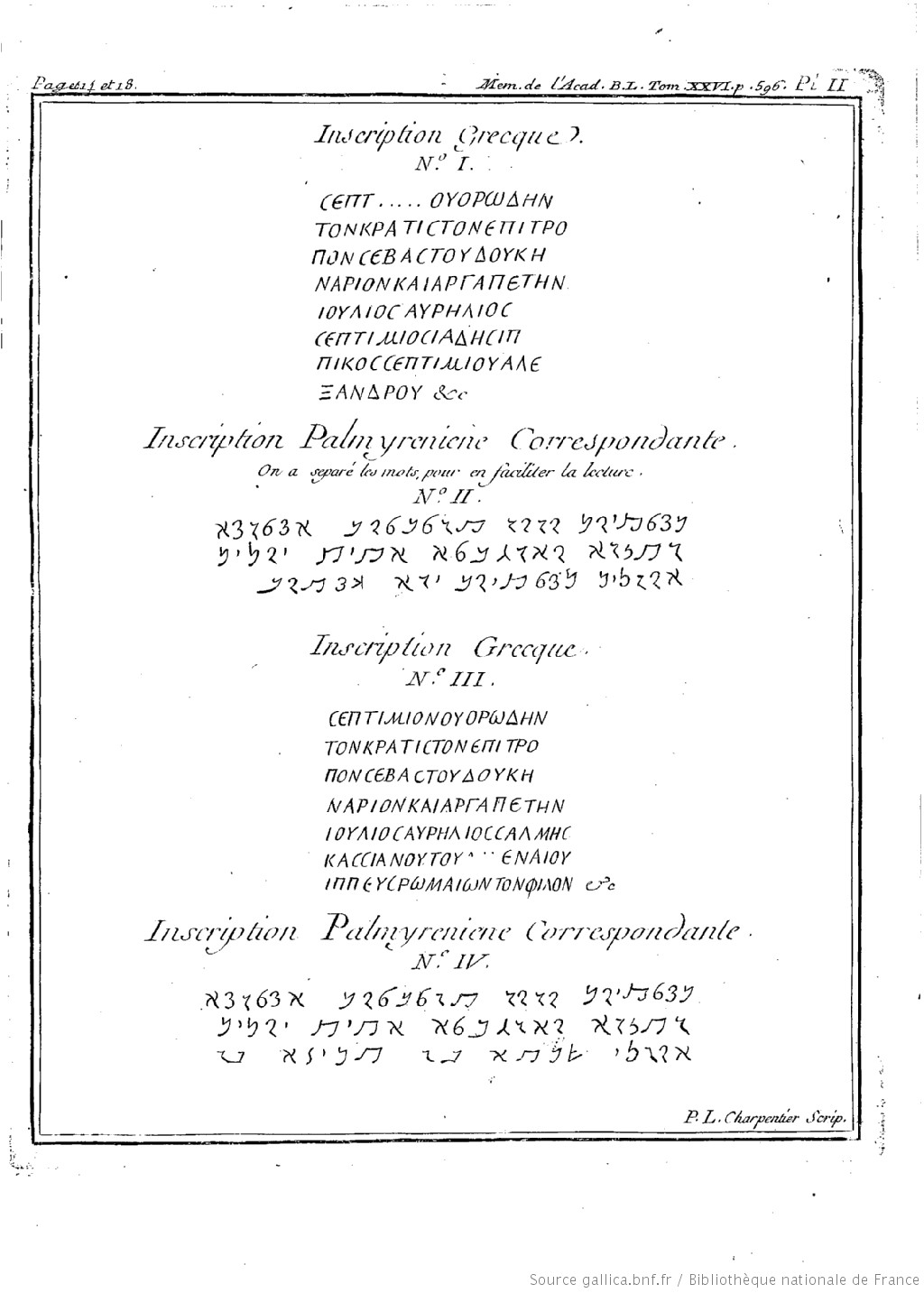
Palmyrian-Greek bilingual inscriptions in Barthélémy, 1754

==== Phoenician alphabet ====
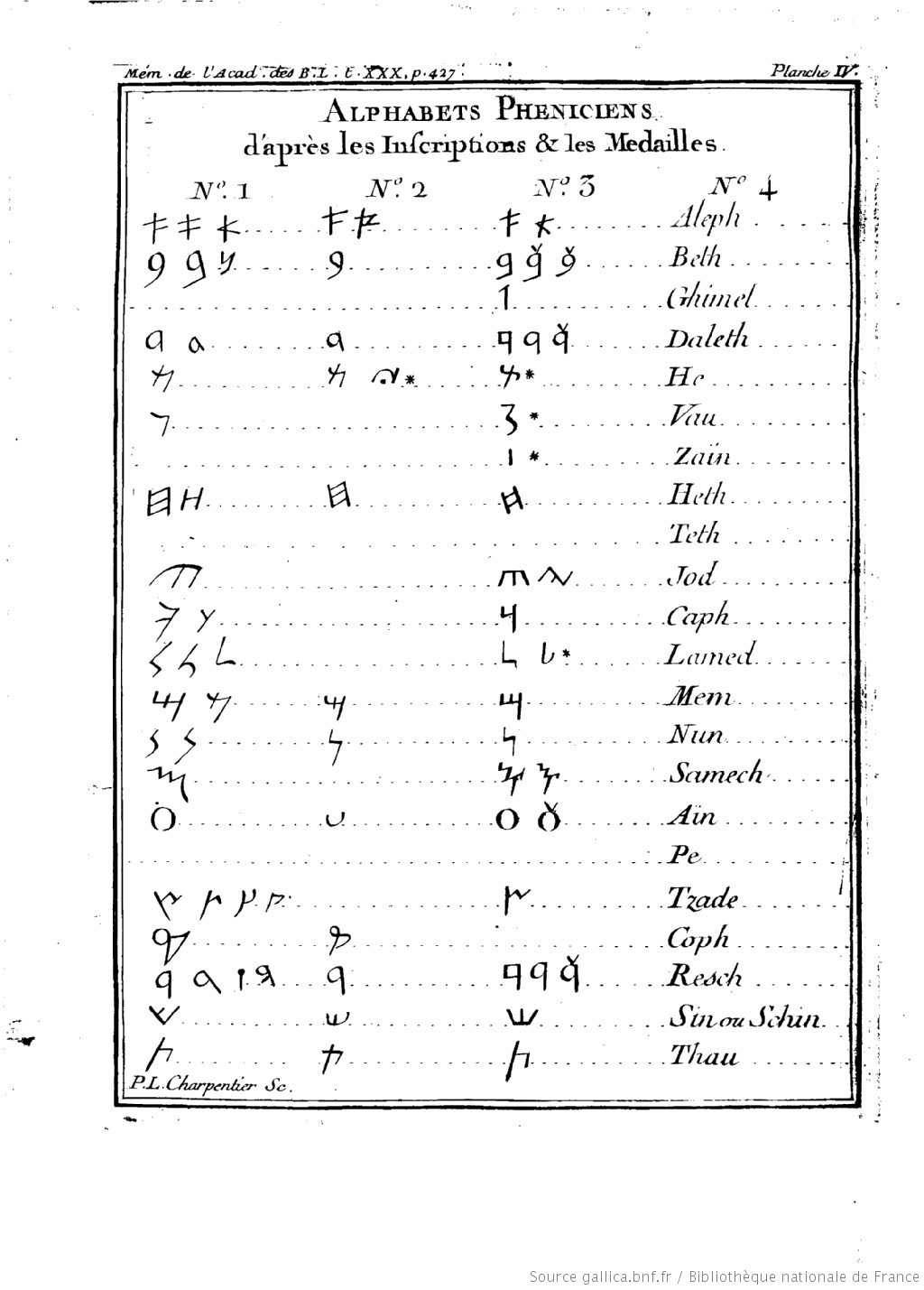
Barthélémy's summary of the Phoenician alphabet. No.1 is from the Cippi of Melqart, No.2 is from his selection of coins, and No. 3 is from the Pococke Kition inscriptions.

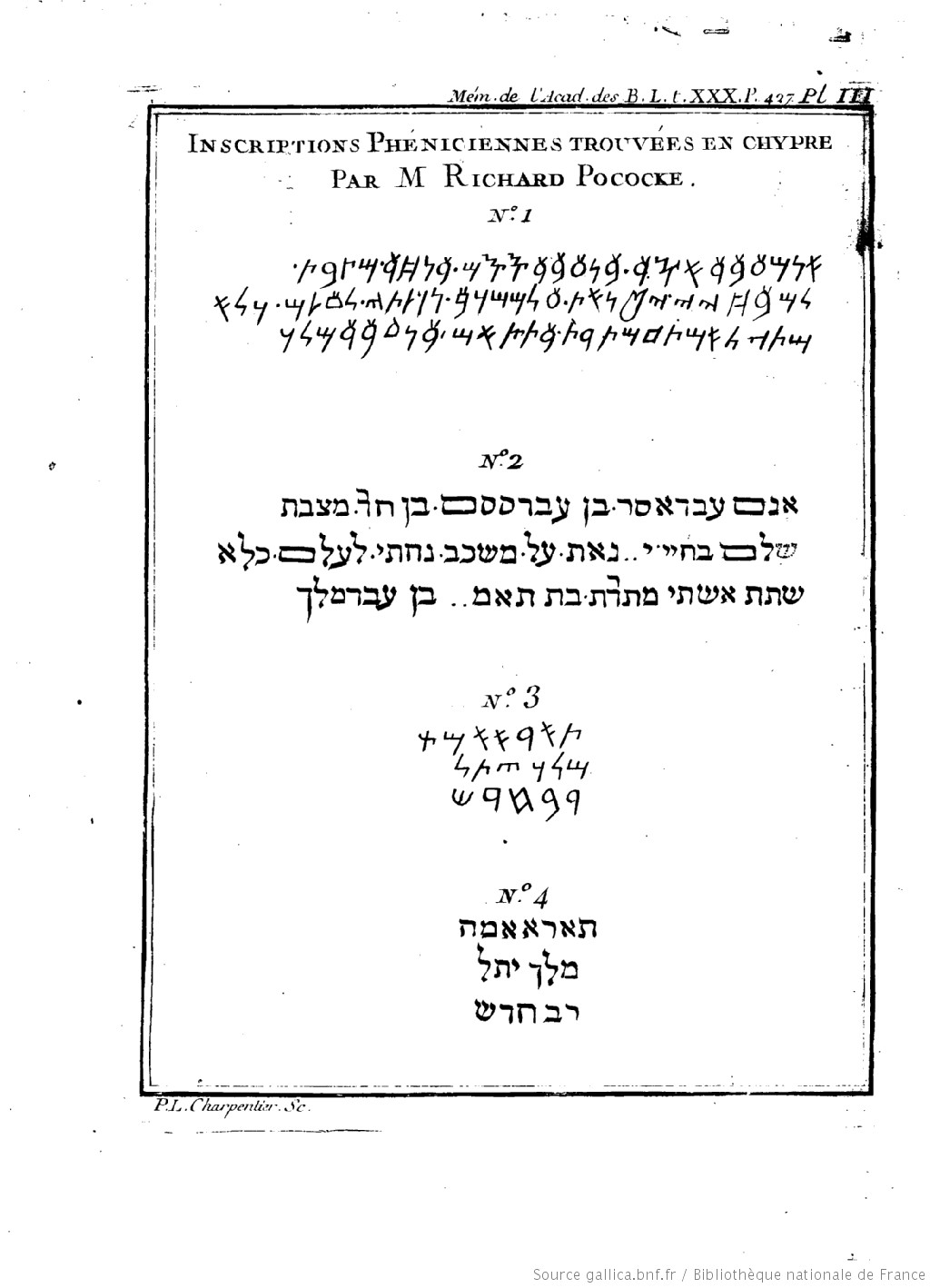
Barthélémy transcription of the Pococke Kition inscriptions. Barthélémy's No. 1+2 is Pococke's No. 2 (KAI 35), and Barthélémy's No. 3+4 is Pococke's No. 4. The other two are Hebrew transliterations of the same inscriptions.

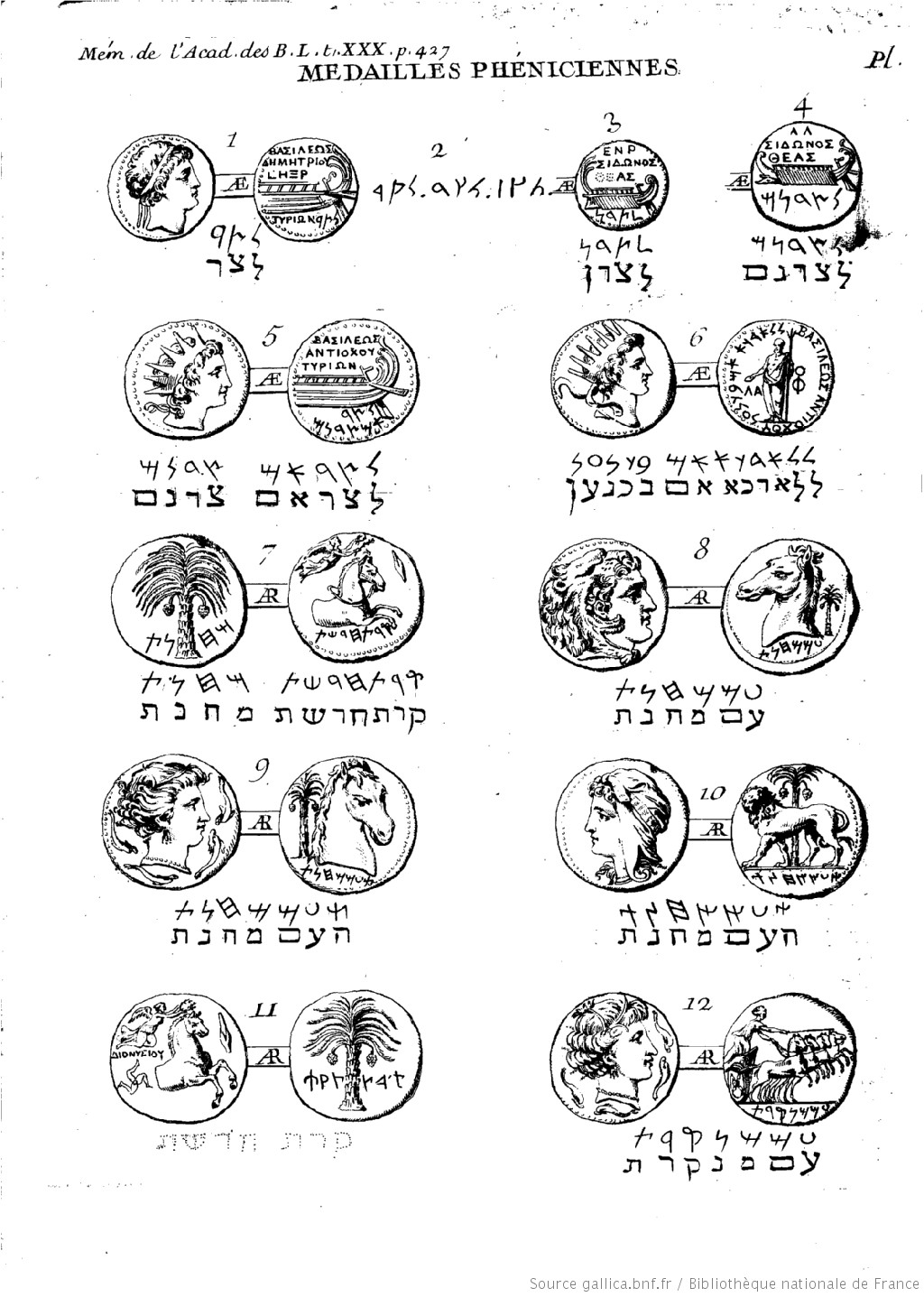
Barthélémy Phoenician coins

==== Egyptian hieroglyphs ====
Abbot Jean-Jacques Barthélemy, working with Anne Claude de Caylus, identified that non-hieroglyphic cursive Egyptian scripts seemed to consist of alphabetical letters graphically derived from hieroglyphs, in Recueil d'antiquités égyptiennes, 1752. This insight was published in English in The Divine Legation of Moses by William Warburton in 1765.

Barthélémy was also the first to suggest, in volume V of the Recueil of Count Caylus, published in 1762, that the signs in Egyptian cartouches probably represented royal names. This discovery by Barthélémy was acknowledged by Champollion in his Précis.

=== Travels of Anacharsis the Younger ===
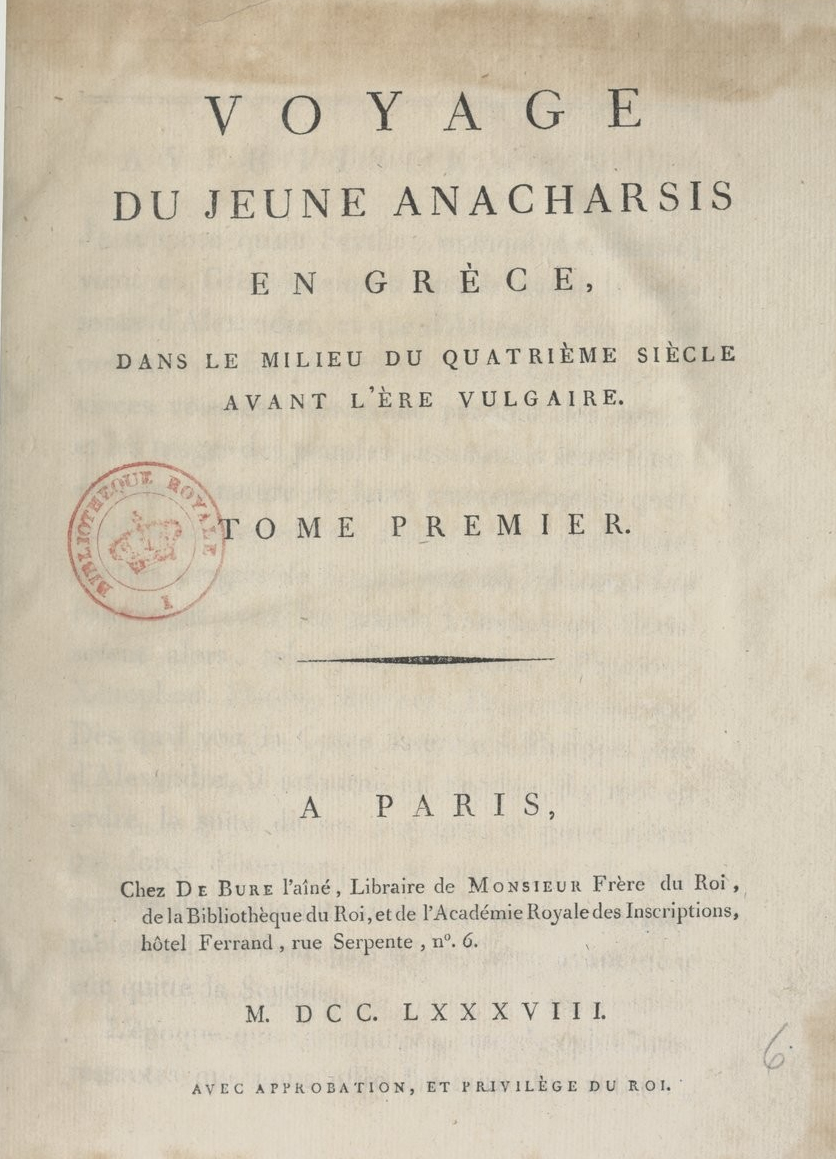
Frontispiece of the 1788 edition of Travels of Anacharsis the Younger in Greece

Barthélemy was the author of a number of learned works on antiquarian subjects, but the great work on which his fame rests is Travels of Anacharsis the Younger in Greece (French: Voyage du jeune Anarcharsis en Grèce, 4 vols., 1787). He had begun it in 1757 and had been working on it for thirty years. The hero, a young Scythian descended from the famous philosopher Anacharsis, is supposed to repair to Greece for instruction in his early youth, and after making the tour of her republics, colonies and islands, to return to his native country and write this book in his old age, after the Macedonian hero had overturned the Persian Empire.

In the manner of modern travellers, he gives an account of the customs, government, and antiquities of the country he is supposed to have visited. A copious introduction supplies whatever may be wanting in respect to historical details, while various dissertations on the music of the Greeks, on the literature of the Athenians, and on the economy, pursuits, ruling passions, manners, and customs of the surrounding states supply ample information on the subjects of which they treat.

Modern scholarship has superseded most of the details in the Voyage, but the author himself did not imagine his book to be a register of accurately ascertained facts. Rather, he intended to afford to his countrymen, in an interesting form, some knowledge of Greek civilisation. The Charicles, or Illustrations of the Private Life of the Ancient Greeks of Wilhelm Adolf Becker is an attempt in a similar direction.

=== Other ===
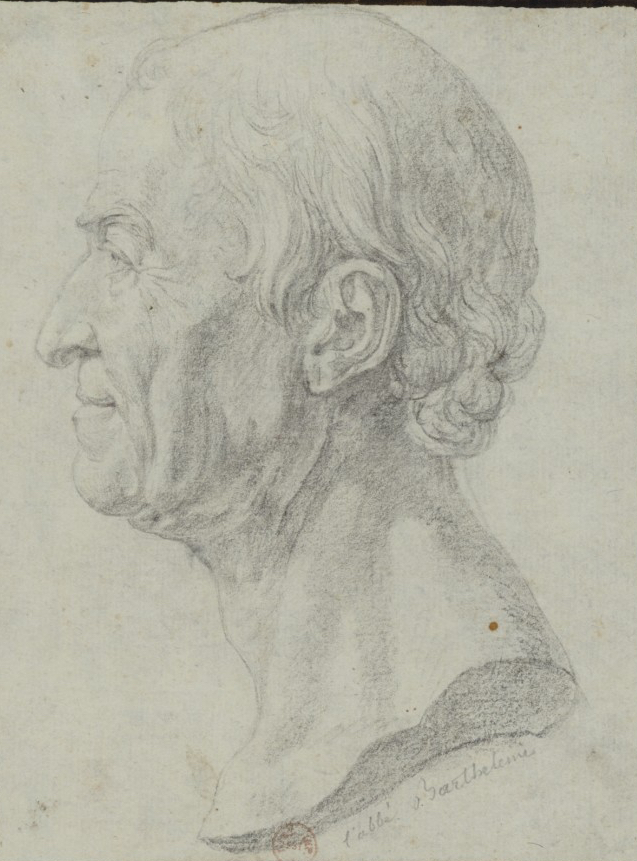
Sketch of Jean-Jacques Barthélemy by Pierre-Simon-Benjamin Duvivier

Barthélemy left a number of essays on Oriental languages and archaeology, originally read before the Academy of Inscriptions and Belles-Lettres; Les amours de Caryte et de Polydore, a novel illustrating ancient manners; and Mémoires of his life. Barthélemy's correspondence with Paolo Paciaudi, chiefly on antiquarian subjects, was edited with the Correspondance du comte de Caylus in 1877 by Charles Nisard. His letters to the comte de Caylus were published by Antoine Serieys as Un voyage en Italie (1801), and his letters to Mme du Deffand, with whom he was on intimate terms, in the Correspondance complète de Mme du Deffand avec la duchesse de Choiseul, l'abbé Barthélemy et M. Craufurt (1866), edited by the marquis de Sainte-Aulaire. See also Mémoires sur la vie de l'abbé Barthélemy, écrits par lui-même (1824), with a notice by Lalande. His works, Oeuvres complètes (4 vols. 1821), contain a notice by Mathieu-Guillaume-Thérèse Villenave, who edited them.

== Works ==
- Barthélémy (1759). "Réflexions sur l'alphabet et sur la langue dont on se servoit autrefois à Palmyre (1754)". Histoire de l'Académie royale des inscriptions et belles-lettres (in French). 26 (Académie des inscriptions et belles-lettres (France) Auteur du): 577–597, pl. I-III.
- Barthélémy (1764). "Réflexions sur quelques monumens phéniciens et sur les alphabets qui en résultent (1758)". Histoire de l'Académie royale des inscriptions et belles-lettres (in French). 30 (Académie des inscriptions et belles-lettres (France) Auteur du): 405 ff.
- Barthélémy (1768). "Explication d'un bas-relief égyptien, et de l'inscription phénicienne qui l'accompagne (1761)". Histoire de l'Académie royale des inscriptions et belles-lettres (in French). 32 (Académie des inscriptions et belles-lettres (France) Auteur du): 725 ff.

== Sources ==
- Delamarre, Louis N. (1913). "Jean-Jacques Barthélemy" . In Herbermann, Charles (ed.). Catholic Encyclopedia. New York: Robert Appleton Company.
