= Pococke Kition inscriptions =

Phoenician and Semitic inscriptions

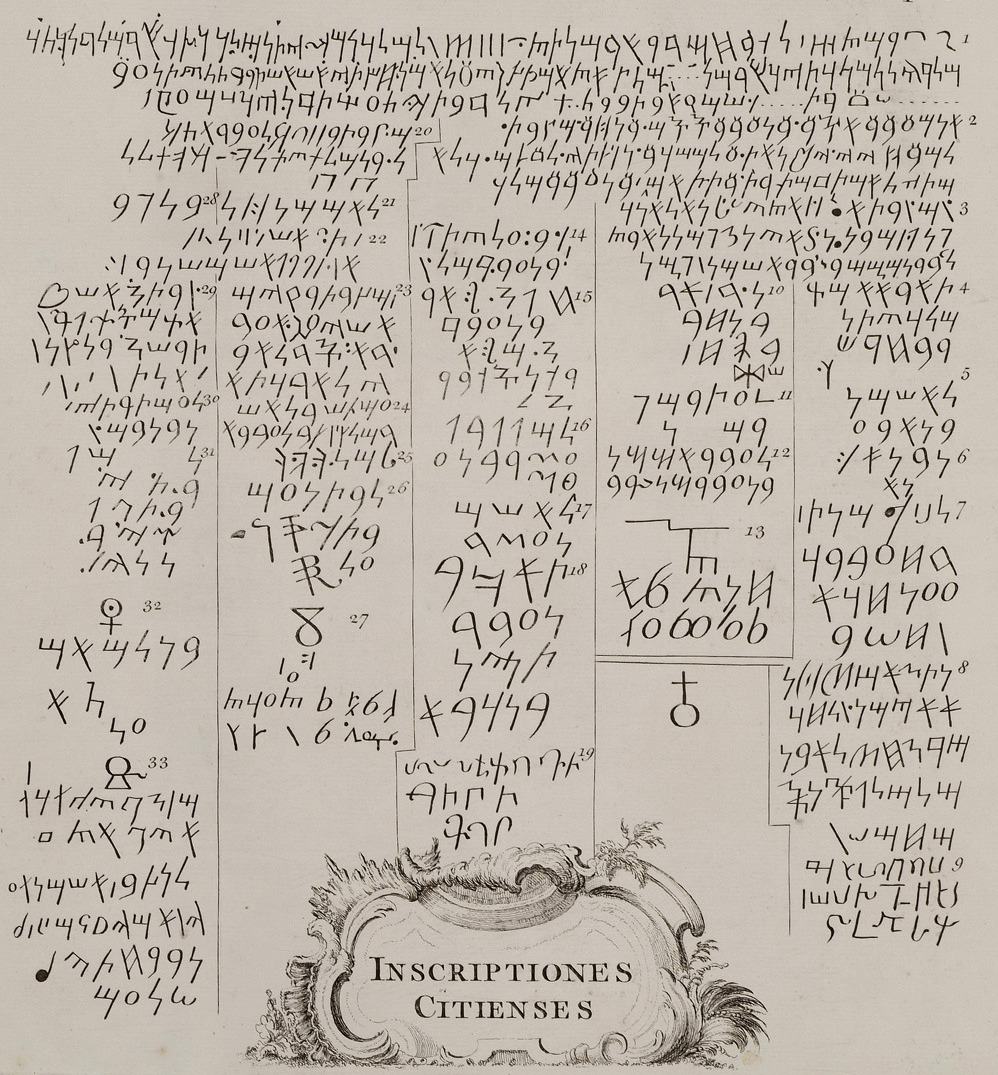
- The inscriptions
- Writing: Phoenician
- Discovered: 1738; Cyprus
- Present location: mostly destroyed

The Pococke Kition inscriptions were a group of 31 Phoenician and 2 non-Phoenician inscriptions found in Cyprus and published by Richard Pococke in 1745. In describing Kition (modern Larnaca), Pococke wrote: "the walls seem to have been very strong, and in the foundations there have been found many stones, with inscriptions on them, in an unintelligible character, which I suppose, is the antient [sic] Phoenician..."

The Phoenician inscriptions are known as KAI 33 (CIS I 11), KAI 35 (CIS I 46) and CIS I 57-85. They represent some of the most important finds in Phoenician and Semitic language studies, as they were used by Jean-Jacques Barthélemy in his decipherment of the Phoenician language.

Only one of the inscriptions still survives, in the Ashmolean Museum - all the rest were destroyed in construction work in 1749.

== Surviving inscription – KAI 35 ==
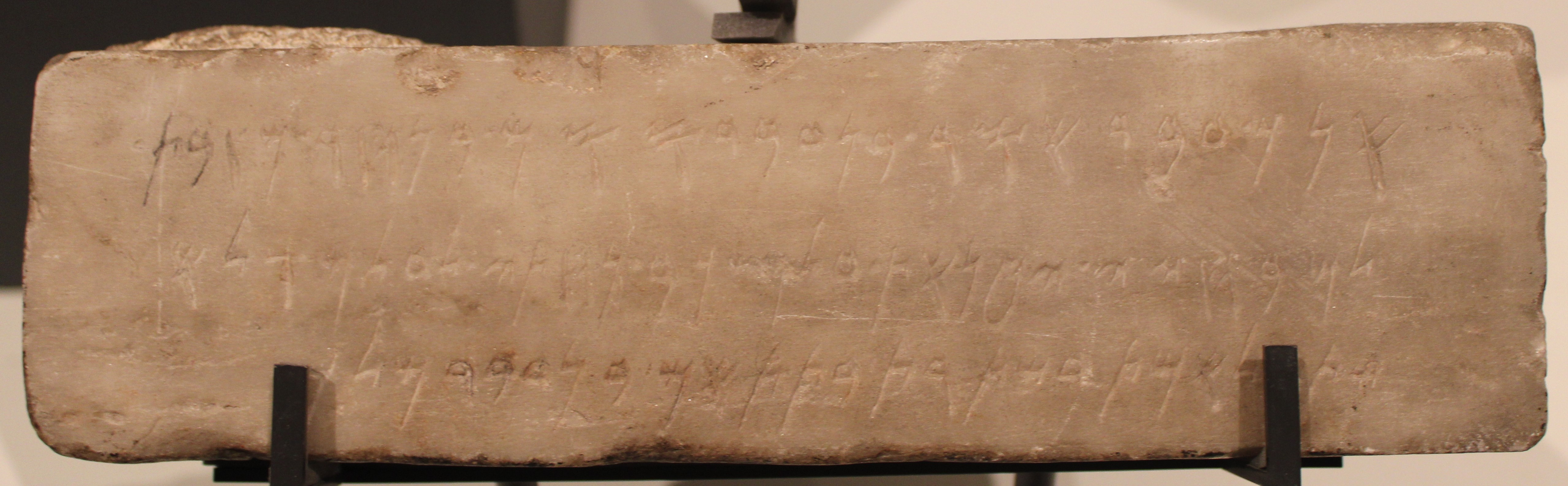
The surviving inscription on display at the Ashmolean Museum, AN1974.325

The sole surviving inscription is a marble funeral stone, numbered "2" in Pococke's sketch, measuring 12 x 3 x 3 inches; the inscription is in memory of a deceased wife. The inscription was brought to England by a Dr. Porter of Thaxted, and presented to Oxford University by Charles Gray MP in 1751. It was published many times, first by Pococke, and then by John Swinton, Richard Chandler, Jean-Jacques Barthélemy, Wilhelm Gesenius, and Johan David Åkerblad.

Today it resides at the Ashmolean Museum, with accession number AN1974.325.

== Concordance ==
Pococke	1	2	3	4	5	6	7	8	9	10	11	12	13	14	15	16	17	18	19	20	21	22	23	24	25	26	27	28	29	30	31	32	33
CIS	11	46	57	64	73	82	74	60	NP	81	79	68	80	78	67	76	70	66	NP	59	71	62	58	65	77	69	83	85	61	72	75	84	63
CIS	11	46	57	58	59	60	61	62	63	64	65	66	67	68	69	70	71	72	73	74	75	76	77	78	79	80	81	82	83	84	85	NP	NP
Pococke	1	2	3	23	20	8	29	22	33	4	24	18	15	12	26	17	21	30	5	7	31	16	25	14	11	13	10	6	27	32	28	9	19

== Gallery ==
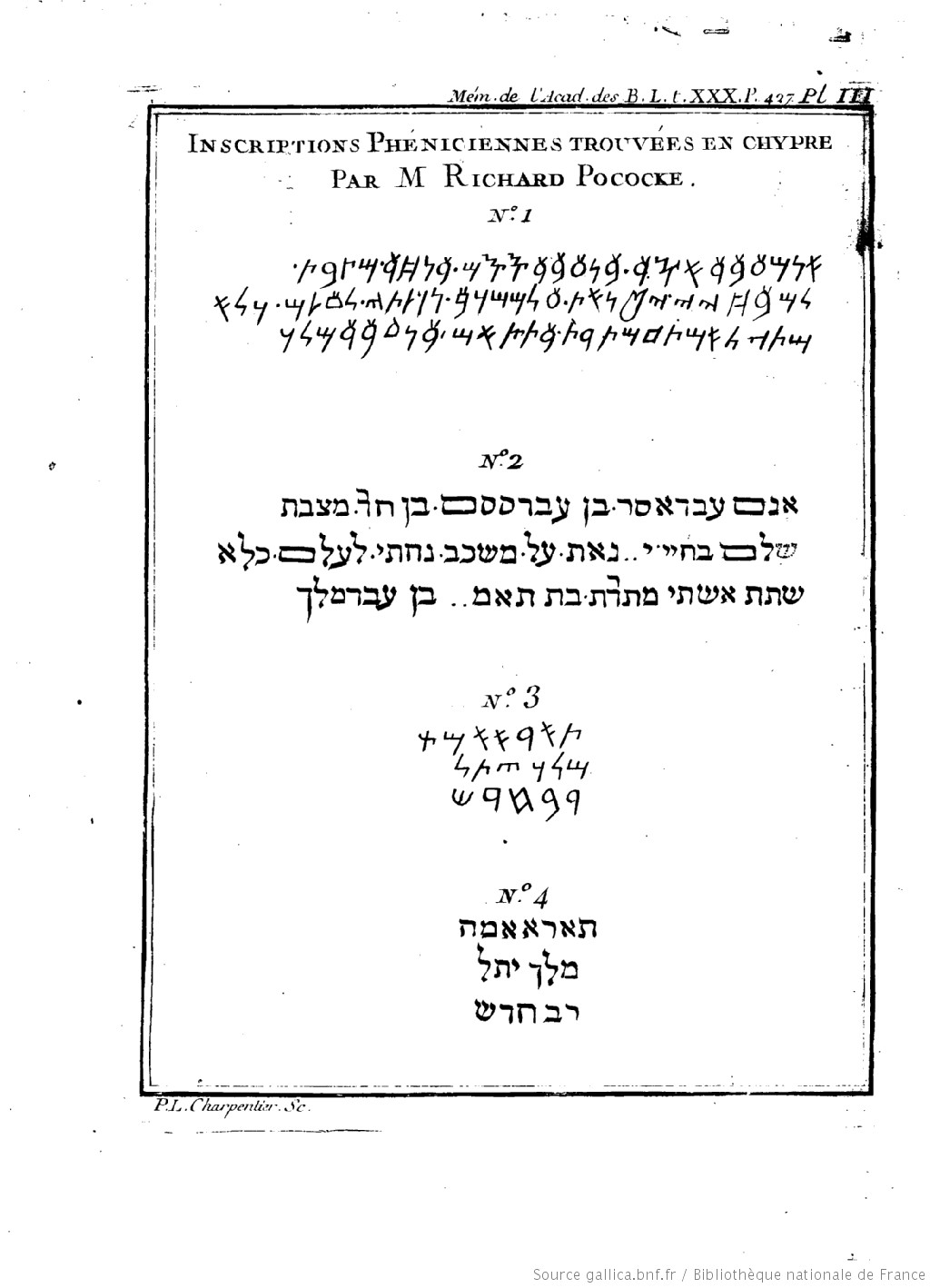
A page from Barthélemy's publication of his decipherment of Phoenician: "Inscriptions Phéniciennes, trouvées en Chypre par M Richard Pococke". No. 1 is Pococke's No. 2 (KAI 35), and No. 3 is Pococke's No. 4. The other two are Hebrew transliterations of the same inscriptions.

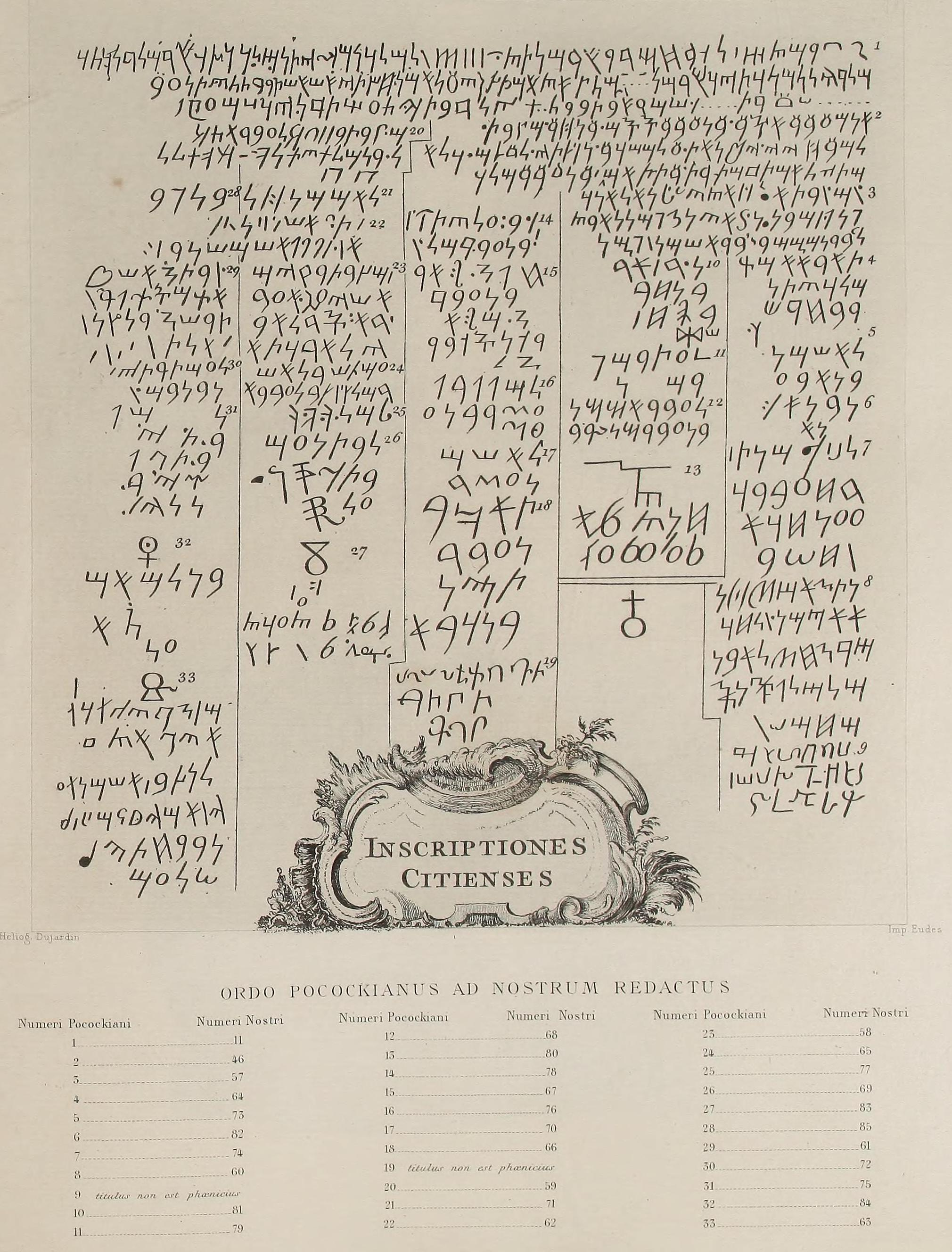
Concordance with the Corpus Inscriptionum Semiticarum (see table at bottom)

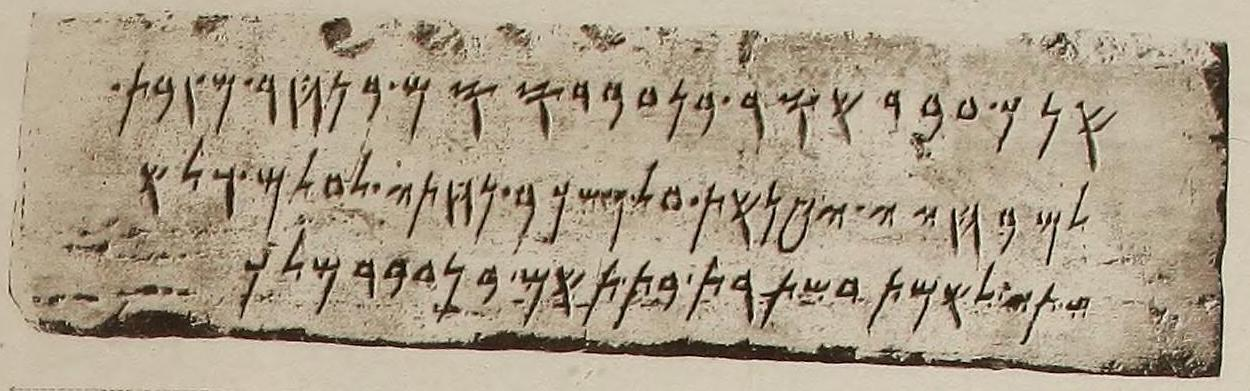
The only surviving inscription, today at the Ashmolean Museum
