= Hatran Aramaic =

Classical Age dialect of Middle Aramaic

Hatran
- Hatrean
- Region: Hatra
- Era: 100 BCE – 240 CE
- Language family: Afro-Asiatic: Semitic; Central Semitic; Northwest Semitic; Aramaic; Eastern Middle Aramaic; Hatran
- Writing system: Hatran alphabet

Language codes
- ISO 639-3: None (mis)
- Glottolog: hatr1234

Ashurian
- Region: Upper Mesopotamia
- Era: Dramatically declined as a vernacular language after the 14th century
- Language family: Afro-Asiatic: Semitic; Central Semitic; Northwest Semitic; Aramaic; Eastern Aramaic; Ashurian
- Writing system: Hatran alphabet

Language codes
- ISO 639-3: –
- Glottolog: assy1241

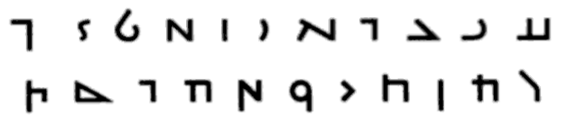
22 Letters of the Ashurian alphabet

Hatran Aramaic (Aramaic of Hatra, Ashurian or East Mesopotamian) designates a Middle Aramaic dialect known from a corpus of 450 inscriptions and graffiti. The language was used in the region of Hatra and Assur in northeastern parts of Mesopotamia (modern Iraq), approximately from the 3rd century BC to the 3rd century CE. Its range extended from the Nineveh Plains in the centre, up to Tur Abdin in the north, Dura-Europos in the west and Tikrit in the south.

Most of the evidence of the language comes from Hatran inscriptions within the cities dating between 100 BC and the mid-3rd century AD, coinciding with Shapur I's destruction of Hatra in 241 AD and Assur in 257 AD. As a result of Hatra being the site with the most attestation, Hatran Aramaic is a more common name. The excavations undertaken by the Iraqi Department of Antiquities in the 1950s brought to light more than 100 Hatran texts, the publication of the first which was undertaken by F. Safar in the journal Sumer. The first four series were the subject of reviews in the journal Syria. The texts range in date from the 2nd or 3rd century BCE to the destruction of the city c. 240 CE; the earliest dated text provides a date of 98 BCE.

Many inscriptions are short commemorative graffiti with minimal text. Some of the longer inscriptions have 12-14 lines. It is therefore difficult to identify more than a few features of the Aramaic dialect of Hatra, which shows overall the greatest affinity to Syriac.

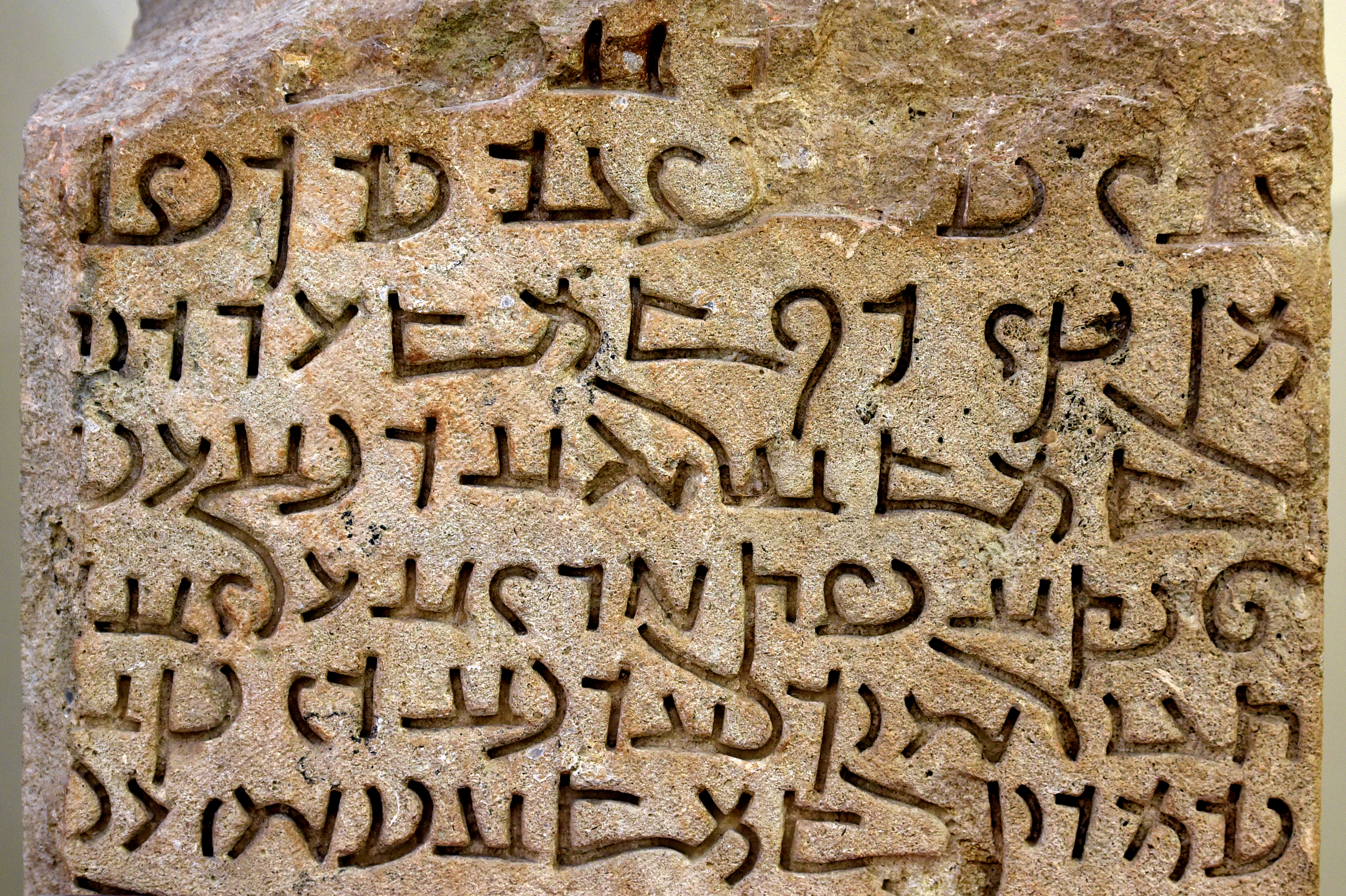
Hatran inscription from the Iraq Museum

The stone inscriptions bear witness to an effort to establish a monumental script. This script is little different from that of the Aramaic inscriptions of Assur (possessing the same triangular š, and the use of the same means to avoid confusion between m, s, and q). The ds and the rs are not distinguished from one another, and it is sometimes difficult not to confuse w and y.

Having conquered the Aramean city-states to the west, the Neo-Assyrian Empire (911–605 BC) adopted Old Aramaic as the official language alongside the Assyrian Akkadian language. With the Achaemenid Empire succeeding them and adopting Old Aramaic, it rose to become the lingua franca of Iran, Mesopotamia and the Levant.

== History ==
The city of Nisibis came under siege several times during the Roman-Persian Wars. However, in 363 AD the Romans were forced to surrender the city to the Persians and standby as the Christian population was expelled. St Ephrem the Syrian was one of these refugees and ended up settling in Edessa. The city was flourishing with pagans, quite the opposite to his beloved Nisibis which had been a bastion for Syriac-speaking Christians. As Edessa's demographics shifted to a Christian-majority which used Syriac as the language of worship, the language rose to become the new regional lingua franca. Well over 70 important Syriac writers are known from the gold age of Syriac (5th – 9th centuries), stretching from the Levant and the Sinai to the foothills of the Zagros Mountains and Qatar. Combined with the devastation of the cities of Assur and Hatra, Syriac replaced the language of the locals and remained as a major language until its decline following the Mongol invasions and conquests and rise of the Neo-Aramaic languages.

=== Development ===
Hatran Aramaic developed through dialectic deviation as well as producing its own script. Various dialects of Aramaic developed around major cities or regions including the sister dialect of Syriac (city of Edessa), Mandaic (region surrounding the head of the Persian Gulf), Nabataean (from the Negev to the east bank of the Jordan River and the Sinai Peninsula), Jewish Babylonian Aramaic (Babylon), Palmyrene (Palmyra) and various Palestinian sub dialects (Palestine). Syriac, Mandaic and Christian Palestinian Aramaic also developed their own variants of the original script which is still employed today by Western Neo-Aramaic speakers as well as members of the Jewish nation for Hebrew who refer to it as "Ktāḇ Āšūrī" (Assyrian writing) since it was the Assyrian monarchs who promulgated it.

Hatran Aramaic and Syriac have been heavily influenced by Akkadian, partly due to the proximity to the heartland as well as the native Assyrians having adopted these two dialects. Many commonly used nouns such as month names were burrowed from Akkadian as well as being influenced phonologically, morphologically and syntactically.

=== Documentation ===
With Hatra enjoying great prosperity during the life of the language, the city has by far the most inscriptions with the city of Assur also containing numerous inscriptions. The rest of the evidence is spread sparsely throughout Dura-Europos, Gaddāla, Tikrit, Qabr Abu Naif, Abrat al-Sagira and Sa'adiya. The surviving corpus which has been published, transliterated and translated consists of commemorative and votive inscriptions, similar to those found in Edessa, Palmyra and among the Nabataean inscriptions. This method usually includes the date of completion of the writing, place, person who commissioned the inscription or statue as well as the scribe's own details on some occasions. Unlike the Neo-Assyrian, Neo-Babylonian and the Syriac scribes of the Sasanian realm, the regal year is not included. Both Assyro-Babylonian and Arabian gods are mentioned in the inscriptions including Ashur, Allat, Bel, Gad (Tyche), Nabu, Nasr, (Apollo), Shamash and Sin. ܽWhile both cities also attest the personal names of affluent citizens, the Hatran rulers with distinctly Parthian names are attested only in Hatra.

| Ashurian Transliteration | English | Syriac Equivalent |
|---|---|---|
| 'Assurḥēl | Ashur is powerful | ܐܠܗܐ ܚܝܠܬܢܐ |
| 'Assurḥannī | Ashur took pity on me | ܐܬܪܚܡ ܐܠܗܐ ܥܠܝ |
| 'Assurəmar | Ashur has declared | ܐܡܪ ܐܠܗܐ |
| 'Assurnṯan | Ashur has given (compare with Esarhaddon) | ܢܬܠ ܐܠܗܐ |
| 'Assur'qab | Ashur has replaced (a son) | ܥܩܒ ܐܠܗܐ |
| 'Assuršma' | Ashur has heard (our prayer/supplication) | ܫܡܥ ܐܠܗܐ |
| 'Assurtāreṣ | Ashur set (it) right | ܬܪܨ ܐܠܗܐ |
| 'Ap̄rahāṭ | Aphrahat (or sage) | ܐܦܪܗܛ ܐܘ ܚܟܝܡܐ |
| Bēṯ(ə)lāhyhaḇ | The house of God has given (a son) | ܒܝܬ ܐܠܗܐ ܝܗܒ |
| Bar Nērgāl | Son of Nergal | ܒܪ ܪܓܠ |
| Bar Nešrā | Son of Nasr (the eagle) | ܒܪ ܢܫܪܐ |
| Māranyhaḇ | Our lord has given (a son) | ܝܗܒ ܡܪܢ |
| Māryā | The lord (used as a term for the Hatran rulers before using the title king; used by Syriac-speaking Christians to refer to God) | ܡܪܝܐ |
| Mlāḇēl | Bel has filled | ܡܠܐ ܒܝܠ |
| Nḇūḇnā | Nabu has built (a son) | ܒܢܐ ܢܒܘ |
| Nḇūḡabbār | Nabu is mighty | ܢܒܘ ܓܢܒܪܐ |
| Nḇūdayyān | Nabu is the judge | ܢܒܘ ܕܝܢܐ |
| Nērgāldammar | Nergal is wondrous | ܢܪܓܠ ܕܘܡܪܐ |
| Nešrānṯan | Nasr has given (a son) | ܢܬܠ ܢܫܪܐ |
| Sanaṭrūq | Sanatruq I and Sanatruq II | ܣܢܛܪܘܩ |
| Slōkh | Seleucus | ܣܠܘܟ |
| Walagaš | Vologash | ܘܠܓܫ |

== Phonology ==
The following features are attested:

=== Lenition ===
A weakening of ʿayn; in one inscription, the masculine singular demonstrative adjective is written ʿdyn (ʿdyn ktbʾ "this inscription") which corresponds to Mandaic and Jewish Babylonian Aramaic hādēn. Similar demonstratives, ʿadī and ʿadā, are attested in Jewish Babylonian Aramaic.

=== Dissimilation ===
- The surname ʾkṣrʾ "the court" (qṣr) and the proper name kṣyʾ, which resembles Nabataean qṣyw and the Safaitic qṣyt, demonstrate a regressive dissimilation of emphasis, examples of which are found already in Old Aramaic, rather than a loss of the emphasis of q, which is found in Mandaic and Jewish Babylonian Aramaic.
- Dissimilation of geminate consonants through n-insertion: the adjective šappīr "beautiful" is regularly written šnpyr; likewise, the divine name gadd "Tyché" is once written gd, but more commonly appears as gnd. This is a common phenomenon in Aramaic; Carl Brockelmann, however, claims that it is a characteristic feature of the northern dialect to which Armenian owes its Aramaic loans.

=== Vocalism ===
The divine name Nergal, written nrgl, appears in three inscriptions. The pronunciation nergōl is also attested in the Babylonian Talmud (Sanhedrin, 63b) where it rhymes with tarnəgōl, "cock."

== Syntactic phonology ==
The Hatran b-yld corresponds to the Syriac bēt yaldā "anniversary". The apocope of the final consonant of the substantive bt in the construct state is not attested in either Old Aramaic or Syriac; it is, however, attested in other dialects such as Jewish Babylonian Aramaic and Jewish Palestinian Aramaic.

== Orthography ==
The dialect of Hatra is no more consistent than that of Palmyra in its use of matres lectiones to indicate the long vowels ō and ī; the pronominal suffix of the 3rd person plural is written indiscriminately, and in the same inscription one finds hwn and hn, the quantifier kwl and kl "all", the relative pronoun dy and d, and the word byš and bš "evil".

=== Alphabet ===
Hatran script Hatran Aramaic script
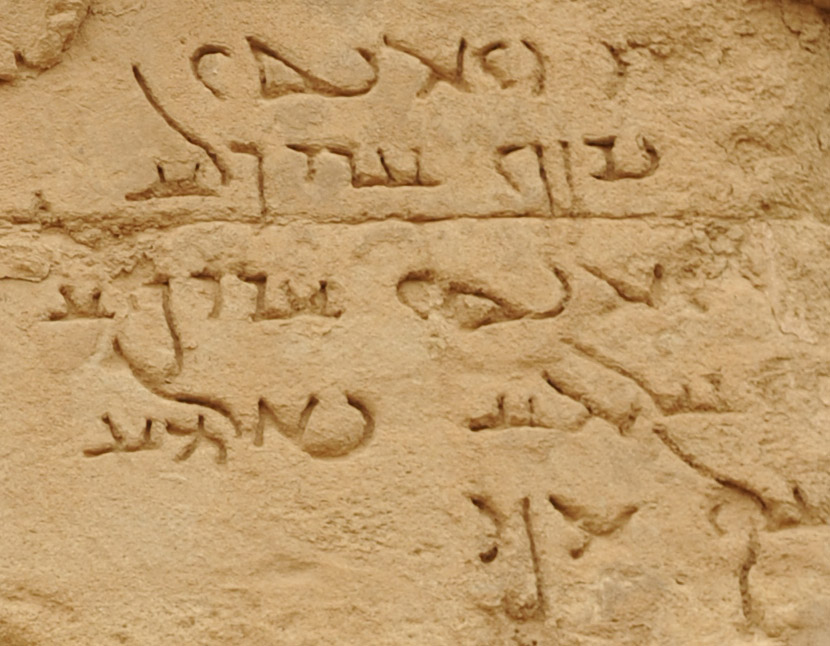
- Script type: Abjad
- Period: c.98 BCE — c.257 AD

Related scripts
- Parent systems: Proto-Sinaitic alphabet: Phoenician alphabet; Aramaic alphabet; Hatran script

ISO 15924
- ISO 15924: Hatr (127), Hatran

Unicode
- Unicode alias: Hatran
- Unicode range: U+108E0–U+108FF; Final Accepted Script Proposal

The Hatran alphabet is the script used to write Hatran Aramaic, and many inscriptions of this alphabet could be found at Hatra, an ancient city in northern Iraq built by the Seleucid Empire and also used by the Parthian Empire, but subsequently destroyed by the Sassanid Empire in 241 AD. Assur also has several inscriptions which came to an end following its destruction by the Sasanians in 257 AD while the rest of the inscriptions are spread sparsely throughout Dura-Europos, Gaddala, Tur Abdin, Tikrit, Sa'adiya and Qabr Abu Naif. Many of the contemporary ruins were destroyed by Islamic State of Iraq and the Levant in early 2015. It was encoded in the Unicode Standard 8.0 with support from UC Berkeley's Script Encoding Initiative.

The script is written from right to left, as is typical of Aramaic scripts and of most abjads. Numerals are also written from right to left (bigger place value on the right), and there are two known punctuation marks as well. Some common ligatures also exist, and they do not appear to be necessary, and are rather just a shorthand form of writing. Some 600 texts are known to exist.

The alphabet consists of the letters listed in the following table. Ligatures have been used in certain inscriptions, although it appears to be optional.

| Name | Letter | Sound Value | | Imperial Aramaic Equivalent | Syriac Equivalent | Phoenician Equivalent | Hebrew Equivalent | Arabic Equivalent | Inscriptional Parthian Equivalent | Inscriptional Pahlavi Equivalent |
| Name | Inscription Form | Transliteration | IPA | Imperial Aramaic Equivalent | Syriac Equivalent | Phoenician Equivalent | Hebrew Equivalent | Arabic Equivalent | Inscriptional Parthian Equivalent | Inscriptional Pahlavi Equivalent |
|---|---|---|---|---|---|---|---|---|---|---|
| ʾĀlap̄* | 𐣠 | ʾ or nothing | [ʔ] or silent | 𐡀 | ܐ | 𐤀 | א | ا | 𐭀 | 𐭠 |
| Bēṯ | 𐣡 | hard: b soft: ḇ (also bh, v, β) | hard: [b] soft: [v] or [w] | 𐡁 | ܒ | 𐤁 | ב | ب | 𐭁 | 𐭡 |
| Gāmal | 𐣢 | hard: g soft: ḡ (also g̱, gh, ġ, γ) | hard: [ɡ] soft: [ɣ] | 𐡂 | ܓ | 𐤂 | ג | ج | 𐭂 | 𐭢 |
| Dālaṯ* | 𐣣 | hard: d soft: ḏ (also dh, ð, δ) | hard: [d] soft: [ð] | 𐡃 | ܕ | 𐤃 | ד | د, ذ | 𐭃 | 𐭣 |
| Hē* | 𐣤 | h | [h] | 𐡄 | ܗ | 𐤄 | ה | ه | 𐭄 | 𐭤 |
| Waw* | 𐣥 | consonant: w mater lectionis: ū or ō (also u or o) | consonant: [w] mater lectionis: [u] or [o] | 𐡅 | ܘ | 𐤅 | ו | و | 𐭅 | 𐭥 |
| Zayn* | 𐣦 | z | [z] | 𐡆 | ܙ | 𐤆 | ז | ز | 𐭆 | 𐭦 |
| Ḥēṯ | 𐣧 | ḥ | [ħ], [x], or [χ] | 𐡇 | ܚ | 𐤇 | ח | ح, خ | 𐭇 | 𐭧 |
| Ṭēṯ | 𐣨 | ṭ | [tˤ] | 𐡈 | ܛ | 𐤈 | ט | ط, ظ | 𐭈 | 𐭨 |
| Yōḏ | 𐣩 | consonant: y mater lectionis: ī (also i) | consonant: [j] mater lectionis: [i] or [e] | 𐡉 | ܝ | 𐤉 | י | ي | 𐭉 | 𐭩 |
| Kāp̄ | 𐣪 | hard: k soft: ḵ (also kh, x) | hard: [k] soft: [x] | 𐡊 | ܟ | 𐤊 | כ, ך | ك | 𐭊 | 𐭪 |
| Lāmaḏ | 𐣫 | l | [l] | 𐡋 | ܠ | 𐤋 | ל | ل | 𐭋 | 𐭫 |
| Mīm | 𐣬 | m | [m] | 𐡌 | ܡ | 𐤌 | מ, ם | م | 𐭌 | 𐭬 |
| Nūn | 𐣭 | n | [n] | 𐡍 | ܢ | 𐤍 | נ, ן | ن | 𐭍 | 𐭭 |
| Semkaṯ | 𐣮 | s | [s] | 𐡎 | ܣ | 𐤎 | ס | | 𐭎 | 𐭮 |
| ʿĒ | 𐣯 | ʿ | [ʕ] | 𐡏 | ܥ | 𐤏 | ע | ع, غ | 𐭏 | 𐭥 |
| Pē | 𐣰 | hard: p soft: p̄ (also p̱, ᵽ, ph, f) | hard: [p] soft: [f] | 𐡐 | ܦ | 𐤐 | פ, ף | ف | 𐭐 | 𐭯 |
| Ṣāḏē* | 𐣱 | ṣ | [sˤ] | 𐡑 | ܨ | 𐤑 | צ, ץ | ص, ض | 𐭑 | 𐭰 |
| Qōp̄ | 𐣲 | q | [q] | 𐡒 | ܩ | 𐤒 | ק | ق | 𐭒 | 𐭬 |
| Rēš* | 𐣣 | r | [r] | 𐡓 | ܪ | 𐤓 | ר | ر | 𐭓 | 𐭥 |
| Šīn | 𐣴 | š (also sh) | [ʃ] | 𐡔 | ܫ | 𐤔 | ש | س, ش | 𐭔 | 𐭱 |
| Taw* | 𐣵 | hard: t soft: ṯ (also th, θ) | hard: [t] soft: [θ] | 𐡕 | ܬ | 𐤕 | ת | ت, ث | 𐭕 | 𐭲 |

=== Unicode ===
The Hatran (Ashurian) script was added to the Unicode Standard in June, 2015 with the release of version 8.0.

The Unicode block for this script is U+108E0–U+108FF:

Hatran^{[1]}^{[2]} Official Unicode Consortium code chart (PDF)
| | 0 | 1 | 2 | 3 | 4 | 5 | 6 | 7 | 8 | 9 | A | B | C | D | E | F |
| U+108Ex | 𐣠 | 𐣡 | 𐣢 | 𐣣 | 𐣤 | 𐣥 | 𐣦 | 𐣧 | 𐣨 | 𐣩 | 𐣪 | 𐣫 | 𐣬 | 𐣭 | 𐣮 | 𐣯 |
| U+108Fx | 𐣰 | 𐣱 | 𐣲 | | 𐣴 | 𐣵 | | | | | | 𐣻 | 𐣼 | 𐣽 | 𐣾 | 𐣿 |
Notes 1.As of Unicode version 18.0 2.Grey areas indicate non-assigned code points

== Morphology ==
=== Verbal morphology ===
- The perfect: The first person singular of the perfect appears only in one inscription: ʾnʾ ... ktbyt "I ... wrote"; this is the regular vocalization elsewhere among those Aramaic dialects in which it is attested.
- The causative perfect of qm "demand" should be vocalized ʾēqīm, which is evident from the written forms ʾyqym (which appears beside ʾqym), the feminine ʾyqymt, and the third person plural, ʾyqmw. This detail distinguishes Hatran as well as Syriac and Mandaic from the western Jewish and Christian dialects. The vocalization of the preformative poses the same problem as the Hebrew hēqīm.
- The imperfect: The third person of the masculine singular is well attested; it consistently has the preformative l-.
1. In the jussive: lṭb bʿšym "that Baʿl Šemēn may announce it" (Syriac ʾaṭeb(b)), lʾ ldbrhn ... bqṭyrʾ "that he not oppress them" (Syriac dəbar baqəṭīrā "to oppress," lit. "to carry away with force").
2. In the indicative: mn dy lšḥqh "whoever strikes him" (Syriac šəḥaq), mn dy lqrhy wlʾ ldkrhy "whoever reads it and does not make mention of it", mn dlʿwl mhkʾ bmšn "whoever goes from here to Mesene", kwl mn dl^{c}bwr ... wlktwb lʿlyh "whoever passes ... and writes over".
3. The preformative l- is employed identically in the Aramaic of Assur. The dialect of Hatra is thus further distinguished from Syriac (which uses an n- preformative) and also from Jewish Babylonian Aramaic, in which the use of the l- preformative for the indicative is not consistent.

=== Nominal morphology ===
The distinction between the three states is apparent. As in Syriac, the masculine plural form of the emphatic state has the inflection -ē, written -ʾ. The confusion of this form with that of the construct state may explain the constructions bnʾ šmšbrk "sons of Š." and bnʾ ddhwn "their cousins." The absolute state is scarcely used: klbn "dogs" and dkyrn "(that they may be) remembered."

=== Numbers ===
The ancient Semitic construction, according to which the counted noun, in the plural, is preceded by a numeral in the construct state, with an inversion of genders, is attested by one inscription: tltt klbn "three dogs." This same construction has been discovered in Nabataean: tltt qysrym "the three Caesars."

== Syntax ==
As in Syriac, the analytical construction of the noun complement is common. The use of the construct state appears to be limited to kinship terms and some adjectives: brykʾ ʿhʾ. In the analytical construction, the definite noun is either in the emphatic state followed by d(y) (e.g. ṣlmʾ dy ... "statue of ...", sprʾ dy brmrynʾ "the scribe of (the god) Barmarēn") or is marked by the anticipatory pronominal suffix (e.g. qnh dy rʿʾ "creator of the earth," ʿl ḥyyhy d ... ʾḥyhy "for the life of his brother," ʿl zmth dy mn dy ... "against the hair (Syriac zemtā) of whomever ..."). The complement of the object of the verb is also rendered analytically: ...lʾ ldkrhy lnšr qb "do not make mention of N.", mn dy lqrhy lʿdyn ktbʾ "whoever reads this inscription."

Likewise, the particle d(y) can have a simple declarative meaning: ...lʾ lmr dy dkyr lṭb "(a curse against whomever) does not say, 'may he be well remembered'" which can be compared with lʾ lmr dy dkyr.

== Vocabulary ==
Practically all of the known Hatran words are found in Syriac, including words of Akkadian origin, such as ʾrdklʾ "architect" (Syriac ʾardiklā), and Parthian professional nouns such as pšgrybʾ / pzgrybʾ "inheritor of the throne" (Syriac pṣgrybʾ); three new nouns, which appear to denote some religious functions, are presumably of Iranian origin: hdrpṭʾ (which Safar compares with the Zoroastrian Middle Persian hylptʾ hērbed "teacher-priest"), and the enigmatic terms brpdmrkʾ and qwtgd/ryʾ.

== See also ==
- Aramaic language
- Arabic alphabet
- Aramaic studies
- Palmyra
- Roman-Persian Wars
- Syriac

== Sources ==
- Beyer, Klaus (1986). The Aramaic Language: Its Distribution and Subdivisions. Göttingen: Vandenhoeck & Ruprecht. ISBN 9783525535738.
- Beyer, Klaus (1998). Die aramäischen Inschriften aus Assur, Hatra und dem übrigen Ostmesopotamien. Göttingen: Vandenhoeck & Ruprecht. ISBN 9783525536452.
- Caquot, André. "L'araméen de Hatra." Comptes rendus du groupe linguistique d'études Chamito-Sémitiques 9 (1960–63): 87–89.
- Gzella, Holger (2012). "Late Imperial Aramaic". The Semitic Languages: An International Handbook. Berlin-Boston: Walter de Gruyter. pp. 574–586. ISBN 9783110251586.
- Gzella, Holger (2015). A Cultural History of Aramaic: From the Beginnings to the Advent of Islam. Leiden-Boston: Brill. ISBN 9789004285101.
- Brugnatelli, Vermondo, "Osservazioni sul causativo in aramaico e in semitico nord-occidentale", Atti del Sodalizio Glottologico Milanese 25 (1984), p. 41-50.(text online)
- Micheau, Françoise (2006). "Eastern Christianities (eleventh to fourteenth century): Copts, Melkites, Nestorians and Jacobites". In Angold, Michael (ed.). Eastern Christianity. The Cambridge History of Christianity. Vol. 5. Cambridge, United Kingdom: Cambridge University Press. pp. 373–403. ISBN 978-0-521-81113-2.
