= Hatran inscriptions =

Aramaic inscriptions from the ancient city of Hatra

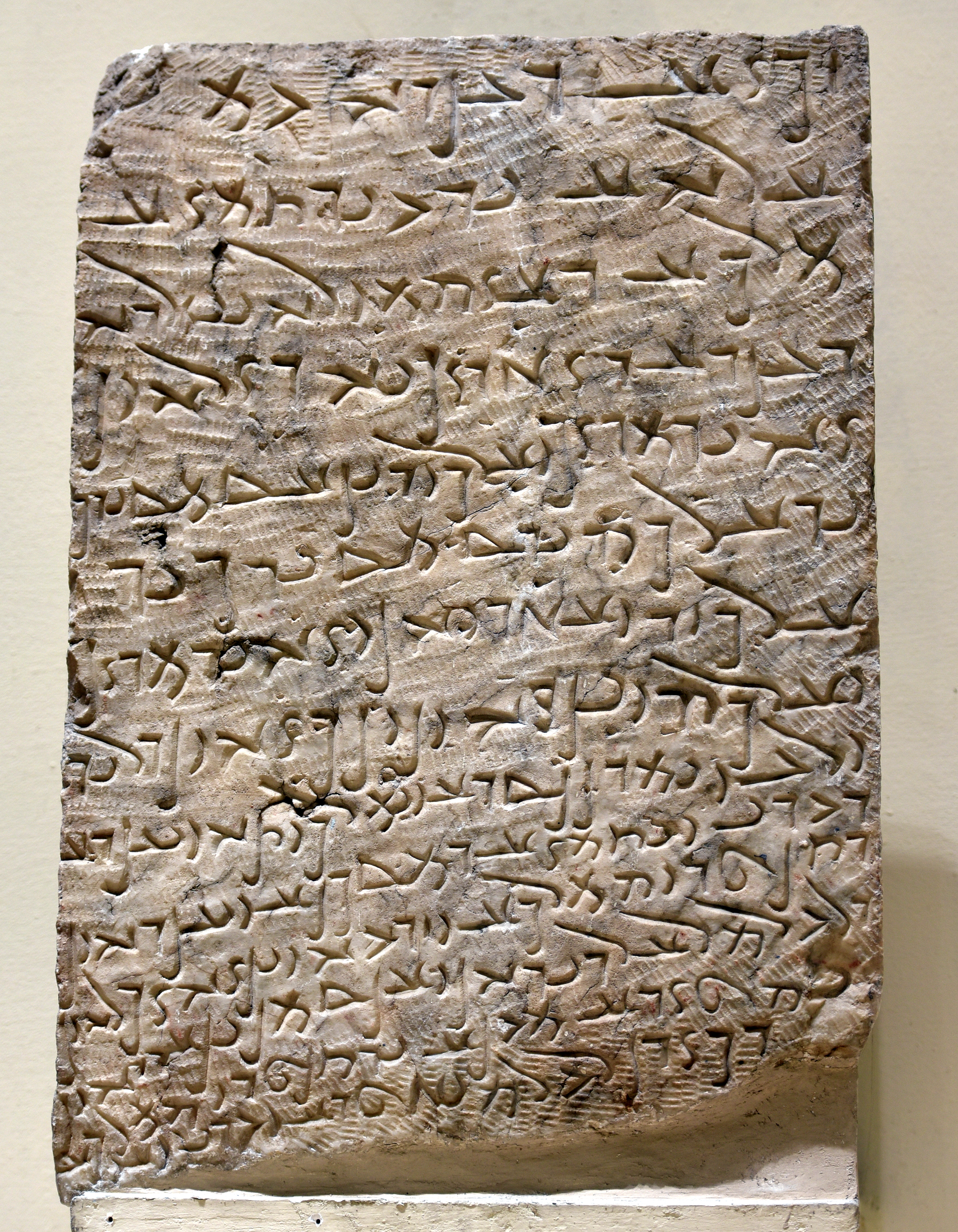
Inscription in the Iraq Museum, known as H-79 or TSSI 70

Hatran inscriptions are a corpus of Aramaic inscriptions discovered primarily at the ancient city of Hatra in northern Iraq. The texts date mainly from the 1st–3rd centuries CE and are written in the Hatran Aramaic dialect using the distinctive Hatran script. The inscriptions constitute one of the most important sources for the language, religion, and political organization of the semi-independent kingdom of Hatra during the Parthian and early Sasanian periods.

More than 450 inscriptions and graffiti are known, mostly carved on stone monuments within the sacred precincts of Hatra, as well as at nearby sites such as Assur and elsewhere in northern Mesopotamia. Only one bilingual inscription is known, in Hatran and Greek; it was discovered in 1993 and published in 2025.

Together with the inscriptions of Palmyra, Nabataea, and Edessa, the Hatran texts form one of the main corpora of Aramaic epigraphy from the Roman and Parthian Near East.

The inscriptions are typically short and formulaic, and include building inscriptions, statue dedications, religious dedications, funerary texts and legal regulations concerning temples and property. Many of the inscriptions are preserved in the Mosul Museum, the Iraq Museum and the Sulaymaniyah Museum.

== Corpora ==
The first published inscription is today known as KAI 257. It was found in 1937 during excavations at the Temple of Atargatis and Hadad in Dura-Europos (Salhije); its script style and language correspond to the rest of the Hatra inscriptions.

The first set of inscriptions from Hatra was published by Fuad Safar in the journal Sumer, beginning in 1951. They numbered sequentially as excavation finds, and this numbering system has since been extended by later scholars as the H-number. The table below shows a concordance with those inscriptions which were also mentioned in significant corpora of Aramaic inscriptions.

H number	Image	TSSI	KAI	Description	No. lines
1			237	Wall of Room 5 in the B-LSMJN Temple	3
4			238	Statue of the goddess Nanaya	9
5			239	Marble statue	4
7				Moneybox	2
9				Altar, incense burner	2
13			240	Marble altar	3
16			241	In the south of the temple	2
20			242	Statue on the east wall of the temple	5
21			243	Marble statue	2
23		67	244	Memorial Prayer from a Temple; east wall of the temple	5
24			245	East wall of the temple	4
25			246	North wall of the temple	3
29		80	247	On Not Wearing Shoes in a Temple; Outer palace sanctuary No. 4	6
30	An inscription	72	248	Statue of Woman with a Curse on Those Who Killed Her	10-12
34		74		“For the Life of …” Dedication	8
35		75		“For the Life of …” Dedication	8
35	An inscription		249	Statue of a woman	8
36			250	Marble statue	6
52			251	Graffito in palace sanctuary No. 3	5
60			252	Lintel of palace sanctuary No. 9	1
62			253	Marble tablet from palace sanctuary No. 9	3
67			254	Threshold in palace sanctuary No. 10	1
71			255	Alabaster base in palace sanctuary No. 10	1
74		68	256	Temple Dedication; Marble slab from the tiles of the southern portico in the central palace sanctuary	8
79	An inscription	70		Royal Statue Dedication	1+14
107	An inscription	64		Building Inscription	8
139		73		Dedication for the Life of the King	4
232		69		Altar Inscription	22
272		65		Building Inscription Dated 138 CE	3
281		76		Employee Regulations	12
342		78		A Law Concerning Temple Slaves	14
344		77		A Temple Regulation	13
408		66		Building Inscription Dated 235 CE	9
343, 336	An inscription	79		A Law on Theft	9
345, 353		71		Royal Statue Dedication	7
-			257	Stone slab from the Atargatis–Hadad Temple in Dura-Europos	4

== See also ==
- Assur ostracon and tablets

== Bibliography ==
=== Initial publications ===
- Fuad Safar, Sumer 7 (1951) 170–184 (H-nos. 1–27);
  - Sumer 8 (1952) 183–195 (H-nos. 28–42);
  - Sumer 9 (1953) 240–249, 271 (H-nos. 43–57);
  - Sumer 11 (1955) 3–14 (H-nos. 58–78);
  - Sumer 17 (1961) 9–42 (H-nos. 79–105).

=== Later studies ===
- A. Caquot, Semitica 4 (1951/52) 55–58; also Syria 29 (1952) 89–118; 30 (1953) 234–246.
- O. Krückmann, AfO 16 (1952) 141–148.
- A. Maricq, Syria 32 (1955) 273–288.
- J. Hoftijzer, JEOL 15 (1957/58) 124f.
- Vattioni, Francesco (1981). Le iscrizioni di Ḥatra (in Italian). Istituto orientale di Napoli.
- Beyer, Klaus (1998). Die aramäischen Inschriften aus Assur, Hatra und dem übrigen Ostmesopotamien: (datiert 44 v. Chr. bis 238 n. Chr.) (in German). Vandenhoeck & Ruprecht. ISBN 978-3-525-53645-2.
- Beyer, Klaus (2013). "Die aramäischen Inschriften aus Assur, Hatra und dem übrigen Ostmesopotamien (datiert 44 v. Chr. bis 238 n. Chr.): Nachträge". Die Welt des Orients. 43 (1). Vandenhoeck & Ruprecht (GmbH & Co. KG): 25–62. ISSN 0043-2547. JSTOR 23608128.
- Aggoula, Basile (1991). Inventaire des inscriptions hatréennes (in French). Librairie orientaliste P. Geuthner. ISBN 978-2-7053-0675-5.
- Bertolino, Roberto (1995). La cronologia di Hatra: interazione di archeologia e di epigrafia (in Italian). Istituto universitario orientale.
- Bucci, Ilaria; de Hoz, María-Paz; Kaizer, Ted; Moriggi, Marco (2025-10-27). "THE FIRST KNOWN INSCRIPTION FROM HATRA IN GREEK AND HATRAN ARAMAIC: NEW INSIGHTS INTO SOCIOLINGUISTICS AND RELIGION AT THE CITY OF THE SUN". Iraq: 1–31. doi:10.1017/irq.2025.10038. ISSN 0021-0889.
