= Hatran (Unicode block) =

- Range: U+108E0..U+108FF (32 code points)
- Plane: SMP
- Scripts: Hatran
- Assigned: 26 code points
- Unused: 6 reserved code points

Unicode version history
- 8.0 (2015): 26 (+26)

Unicode documentation
- Code chart ∣ Web page

Hatran is a Unicode block containing characters used on inscriptions discovered at Hatra in Iraq, which are written in the Hatran alphabet and represent a form of the Aramaic language.

Hatran^{[1]}^{[2]} Official Unicode Consortium code chart (PDF)
	0	1	2	3	4	5	6	7	8	9	A	B	C	D	E	F
U+108Ex	𐣠	𐣡	𐣢	𐣣	𐣤	𐣥	𐣦	𐣧	𐣨	𐣩	𐣪	𐣫	𐣬	𐣭	𐣮	𐣯
U+108Fx	𐣰	𐣱	𐣲		𐣴	𐣵						𐣻	𐣼	𐣽	𐣾	𐣿
Notes: 1. As of Unicode version 16.0; 2. Grey areas indicate non-assigned code points

== History ==
The following Unicode-related documents record the purpose and process of defining specific characters in the Hatran block:

Version	Final code points (Note: Proposed code points and characters names may differ from final code points and names)	Count	L2 ID	WG2 ID	Document
8.0	U+108E0..108F2, 108F4..108F5, 108FB..108FF	26	L2/12-312	N4324	Everson, Michael (2012-09-24), Preliminary proposal for encoding the Hatran script
8.0	U+108E0..108F2, 108F4..108F5, 108FB..108FF	26		N4353 (pdf, doc)	"M60.12", Unconfirmed minutes of WG 2 meeting 60, 2013-05-23
8.0	U+108E0..108F2, 108F4..108F5, 108FB..108FF	26	L2/13-132		Moore, Lisa (2013-07-29), "Consensus 136-C17", UTC #136 Minutes, "Approve 26 Hatran characters with block Hatran at U+108E0..U+108FF, with code points, names, and glyphs as shown in L2/13-151 for a future version of the standard."
8.0	U+108E0..108F2, 108F4..108F5, 108FB..108FF	26		N4403 (pdf, doc)	Umamaheswaran, V. S. (2014-01-28), "Resolution M61.02 item f", Unconfirmed minutes of WG 2 meeting 61, Holiday Inn, Vilnius, Lithuania; 2013-06-10/14
