= Hatra =

Archaeological site in Iraq

- الحضر (Arabic)
- al-Ḥaḍr
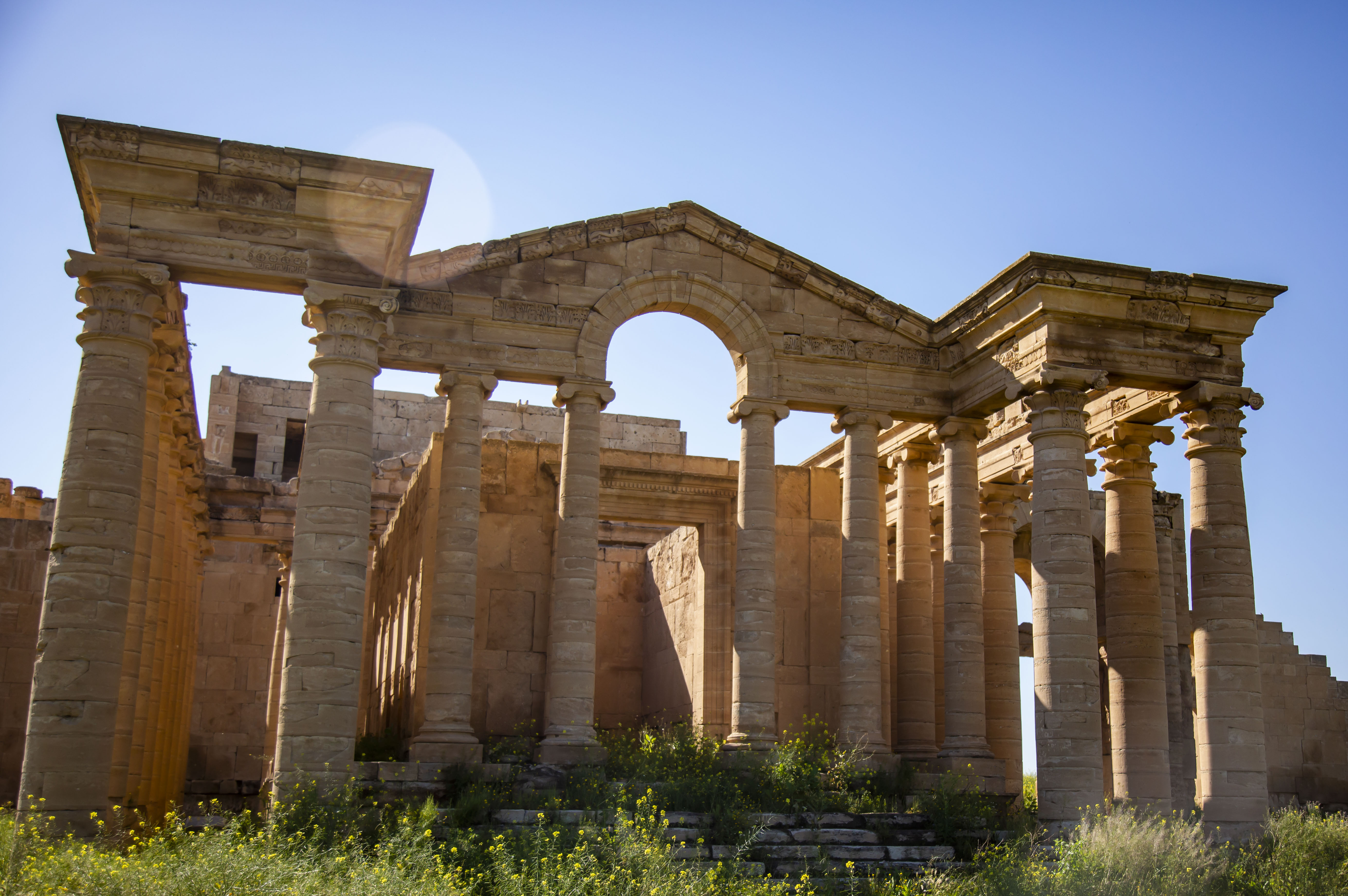
- The ruins of Hatra in 2019

- Location within Iraq Location within Near East Location within West and Central Asia
- 35°35′17″N 42°43′6″E
- Type: Settlement, temple
- Cultures: Arab, Mesopotamian, Assyrian, Parthian
- Satellite of: Parthian Empire
- Location: Hatra District, Nineveh Governorate, Iraq
- Region: Mesopotamia

History
- Built: 3rd or 2nd century BC
- Abandoned: 241 AD
- Event: Fall of Hatra

Site notes
- Area: 300 ha (740 acres)
- Condition: Ruins
- Public access: Accessible

UNESCO World Heritage Site
- Official name: Hatra
- Type: Cultural
- Criteria: ii, iii, iv, vi
- Designated: 1985 (9th session)
- Reference no.: 277
- Region: Arab States

Hatra (/ˈhætrə/; Arabic: الحَضْر (Arabic pronunciation: [al.ˈħadˤr]); Syriac: ܚܛܪܐ) was an ancient city in Upper Mesopotamia located in present-day eastern Nineveh Governorate in northern Iraq. The ruins of the city lie 290 km (180 mi) northwest of Baghdad and 110 km (68 mi) southwest of Mosul. It was a strongly fortified caravan city and capital of the Arab Kingdom of Hatra, located between the Roman and Parthian/Sasanian Empires.

Hatra flourished in the 2nd century AD, and was destroyed by the Sassanid Empire and deserted in the 3rd century AD alongside other Neo-Assyrian populated states such as Assur, Adiabene, Osroene and Beth Nuhadra. Its ruins were discovered in the 19th century. It is considered the richest archaeological site from the Parthian Empire known to date. The first of the Hatran inscriptions was discovered in 1937.

== Name ==
Hatra is known as al-Ḥaḍr (الحضر) in Arabic. It is recorded as 𐣧𐣨𐣣𐣠 (ḥṭrʾ, vocalized as: Ḥaṭrāʾ) in Hatran inscriptions, probably meaning "enclosure, hedge, fence". In Syriac, it is usually recorded in the plural form Ḥaṭrē. In Roman works, it is recorded as Greek Átra and Latin Hatra and Hatris.

The temple of the local Assyrian god Shamash, was officially called Beit ʾElāhāʾ 𐣡𐣩𐣵 𐣠𐣫𐣤𐣠 "House of God", in Mesopotamian Aramaic inscriptions The city was recorded as "Enclosure of Shamash" (ḥtrʾ d-šmš 𐣧𐣨𐣣𐣠 𐣣𐣴𐣬𐣴) on a coin.

== History ==
There is no archeological information on the city before the Parthian period but settlement in the area likely dates back to at least the Seleucid period. The foundation of Hatra is believed to date to the 3rd or 2nd century BCE under the Seleucid Kingdom, It flourished because of its strategic position along caravan trade routes in the 1st and 2nd centuries CE as the capital of the Kingdom of Araba (Hatra) a semi-autonomous kingdom under the Parthian influence. The city became the capital in the chain of largely Arab-controlled cities running from Hatra, in the northeast, via Palmyra, Baalbek and Petra, in the southwest. The Kingdom of Hatra, became a buffer kingdom between the western limits of the Parthian Empire and the eastern limits of the Roman Empire, while being governed by Arabian princes.

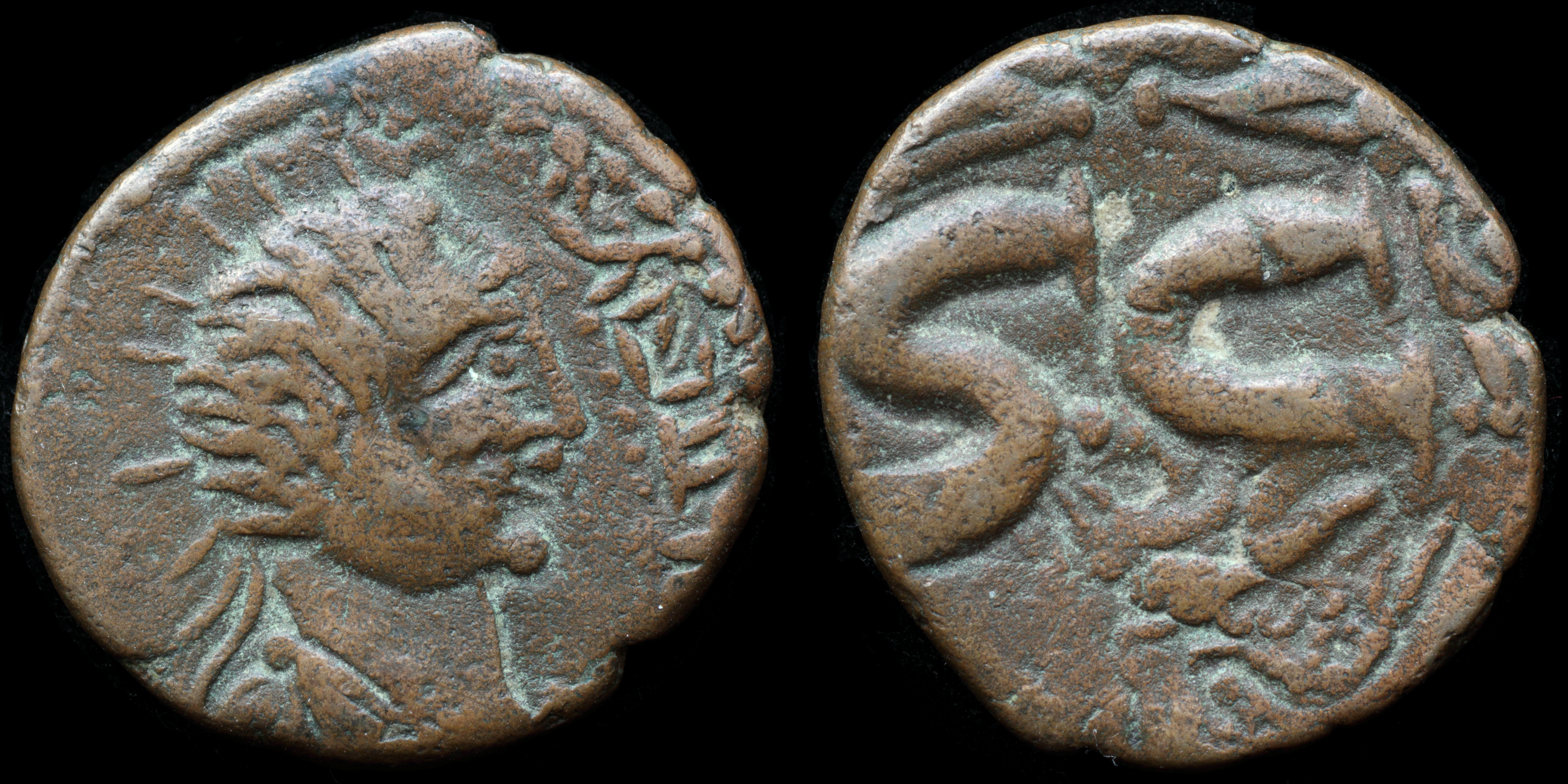
bronze coin struck in Hatra circa 117–138 AD. Obverse depicts radiate bust of Shamash

Plan of Hatra

Hatra became an important fortified frontier city and played an important role in the Second Parthian War, withstanding repeated attacks by the Roman Empire. During the 2nd century AD, the city repulsed sieges by both Trajan (116/117) and Septimius Severus (198/199). Hatra's forces defeated the ascendant Sassanid Persians in 238 at the battle of Shahrazoor, but fell shortly after in 241 to the army of Sassanid king Shapur I and was destroyed. The traditional stories of the fall of Hatra tell of al-Nadirah, daughter of the king of Araba, who betrayed the city into the hands of Shapur as she fell in love with him. The story tells of how Shapur killed the king and married al-Nadirah, but later had her killed also after realizing her ingratitude towards her father.

Hatra was the best preserved and most informative example of ancient Arabian architecture. Its plan was circular, and was encircled by inner and outer walls nearly 2 kilometres (1.2 mi) in diameter and supported by more than 160 towers.

=== Religion ===
A temenos (τέμενος) surrounded the principal sacred buildings in the city's centre. The temples covered some 1.2 hectares and were dominated by the Great Temple, an enormous structure with vaults and columns that once rose to 30 metres. The city was famed for its fusion of Greek, Assyrian, Canaanite, Aramean and Arabian pantheons, known in Aramaic as Beiṯ Ĕlāhā ("House of God"). The city had temples to Nergal (Assyrian-Babylonian and Akkadian), Hermes (Greek), Atargatis (Syro-Aramaean), Allat, Shamiyyah (Arabian), and Shamash (the Mesopotamian sun god). Other deities mentioned in the Hatran inscriptions were the Aramaean Ba'al Shamayn, and the female deity known as Ashurbel, which was perhaps the assimilation of the two deities the Assyrian god Ashur and the Assyrian-Babylonian Bel—despite their being individually masculine.

== List of rulers ==
In the Hatran inscriptions, several rulers are mentioned. Other rulers are sporadically mentioned by classical authors. The earlier rulers are titled mrjʾ (māryā, "lord") as with the Assyrian rulers of nearby Assur, the later ones mlkʾ d-ʿrb ("king of the Arabs"; malkā, "king").

Name		Title	Date	Portrait	Note
1	Worod	mry´			
2	Ma’nu	mry´			
3	Elkud	mry´	155/156		
4	Nashrihab	mry´	128/29 – 137/38 AD		
5	Naṣru	mry´	128/29 – 176/77		
6	Wolgash I	mry´ and mlk			The two brothers may have been co-rulers.
7	Sanatruq I	mry´ and mlk	176/177	Victory relief of Sanatruq I, king of Hatra. He is using a small altar at his feet.	The two brothers may have been co-rulers.
8	Abdsamiya	mlk	192/93 – 201/202	Prince Absadmiya, son of Sanatruq I and future king.	Supported the Roman emperor Pescennius Niger
9	Sanatruq II	mlk – King	207/08 – 229/230	Statue of Sanatruq II, king of Hatra, Iraq Museum.	Became a vassal of the Romans under Gordian III during Roman–Persian Wars

== Art of Hatra ==
According to John M. Rosenfield, the statuary of Hatra belong to the Parthian cultural sphere, with numerous similarities in terms of clothing, decorative elements or posture, which tend to be massive and frontal, with feet often splayed. The architecture of Hatra itself is generally seen as an example of Parthian architecture. Similarities can be seen with the Art of the Kushans as well, due either to direct cultural exchanges between the area of Mesopotamia and the Kushan Empire at that time, or from a common Parthian artistic background leading to similar types of representation.

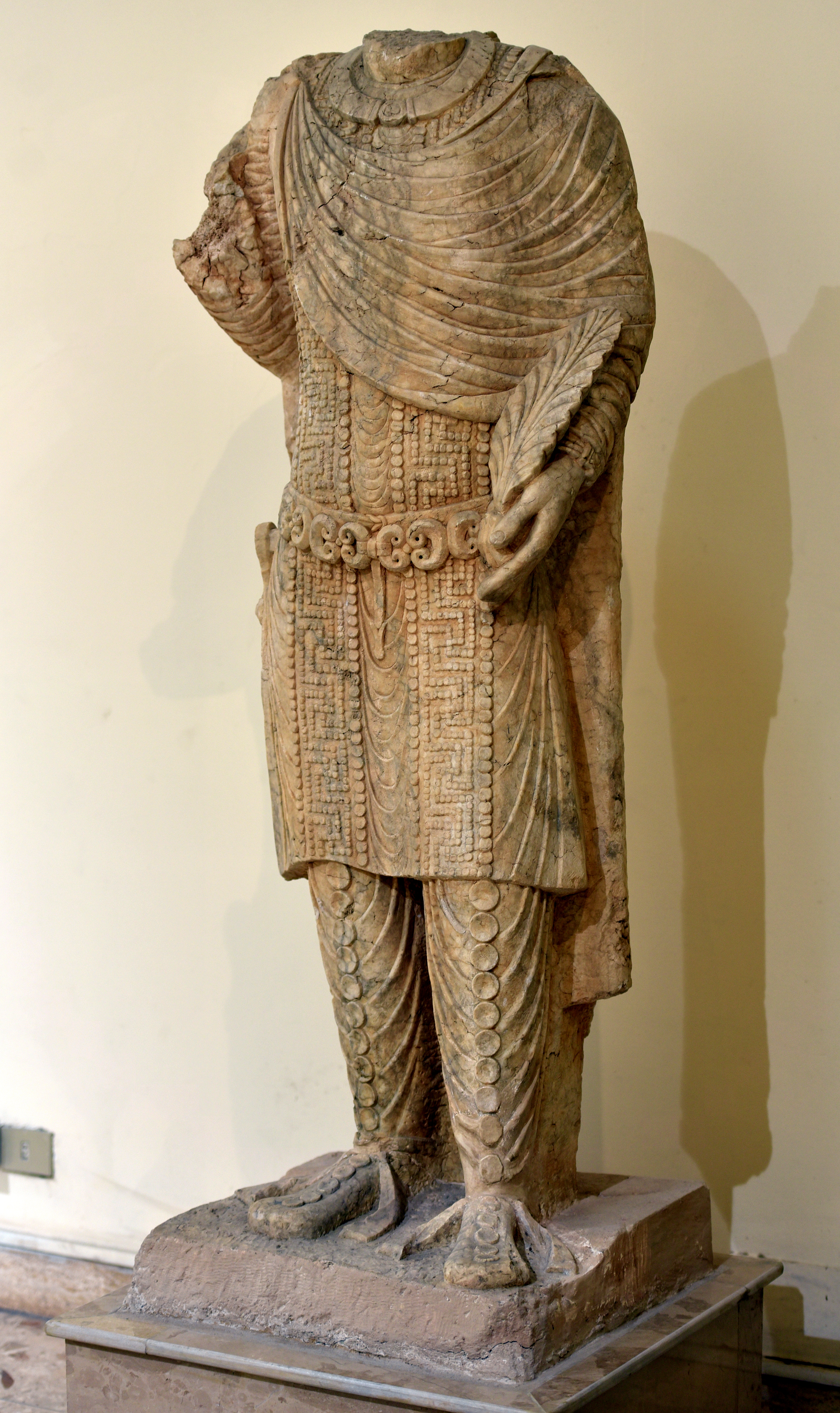
Headless statue of a nobleman.

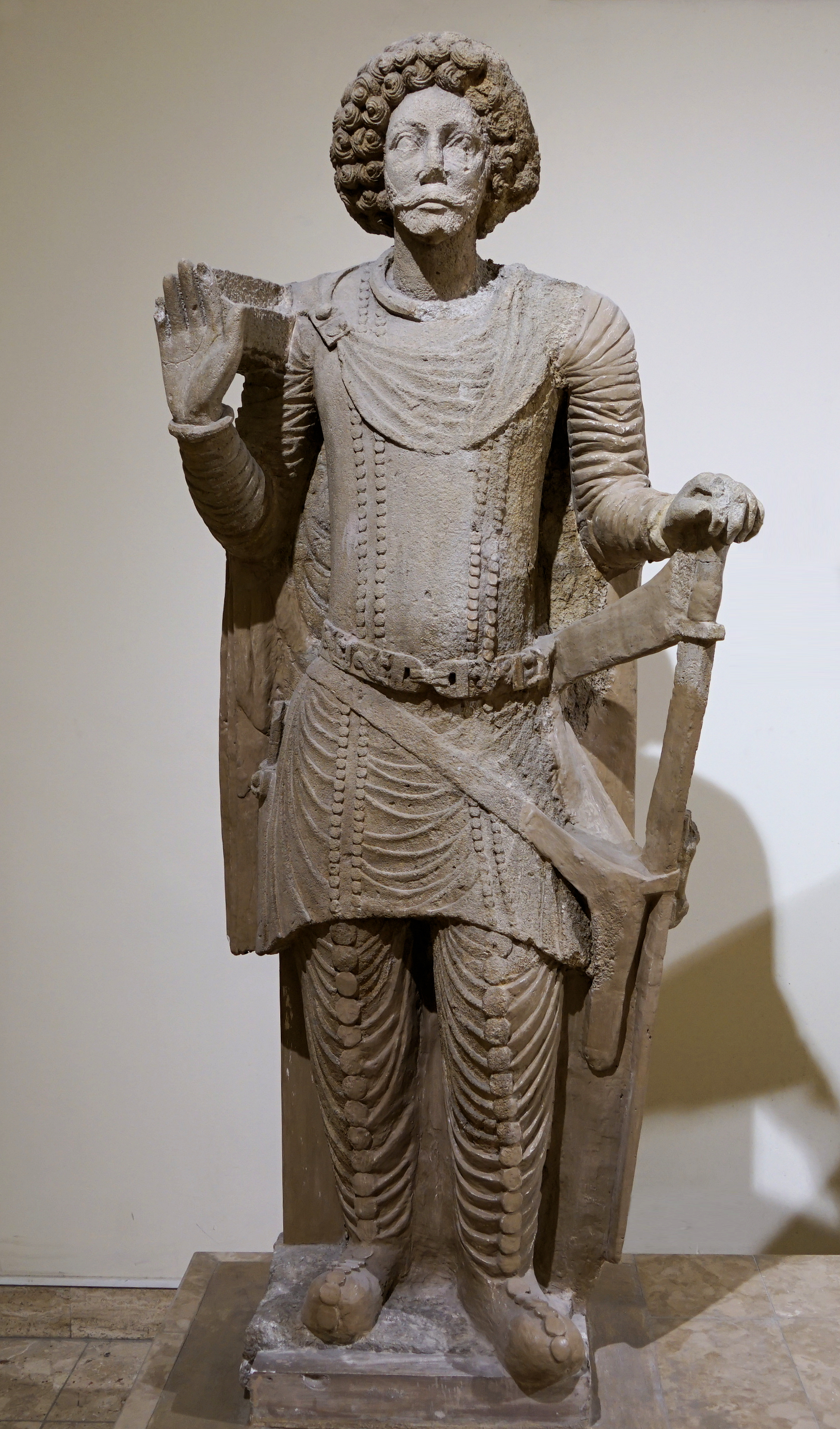
Military commander from the city of Hatra. Iraq Museum, Baghdad.

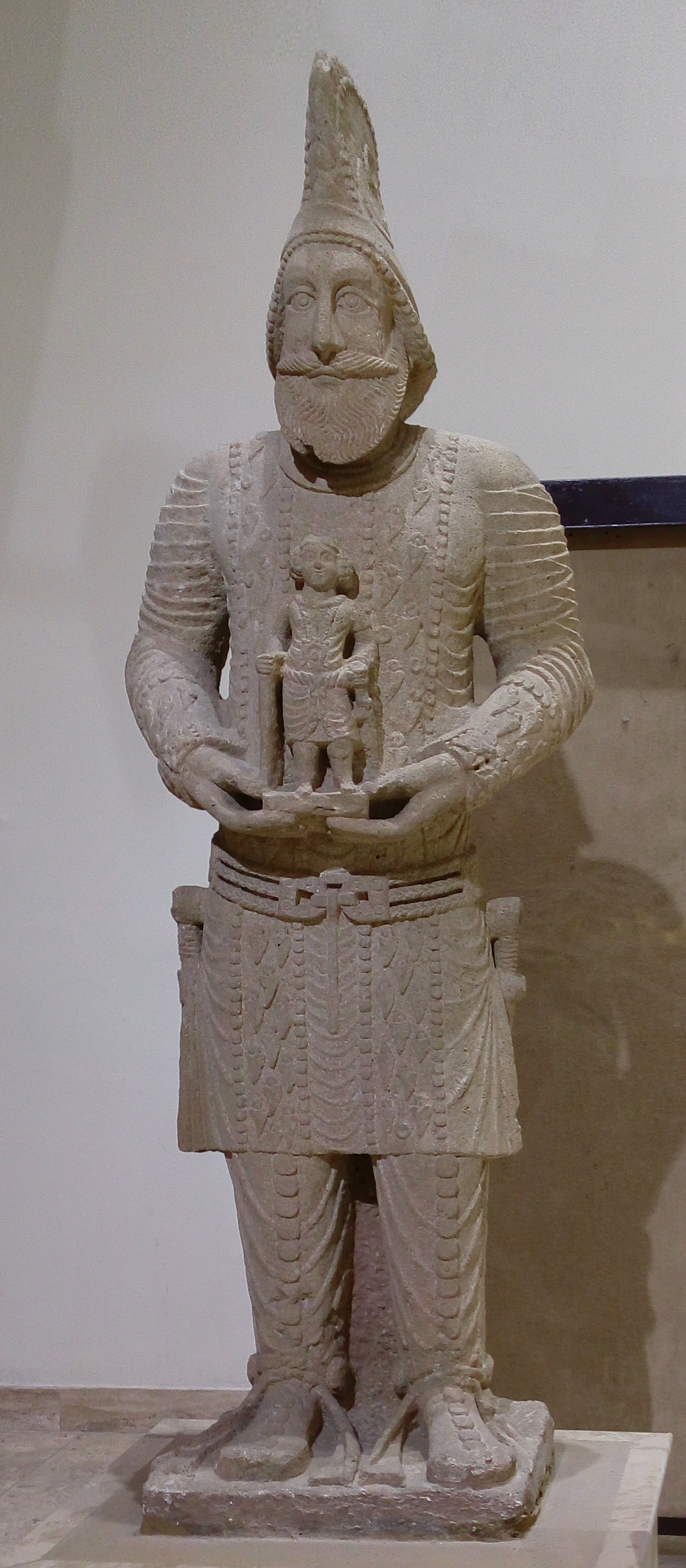
Limestone statue of a military commander in his uniform holding a statue of a deity.

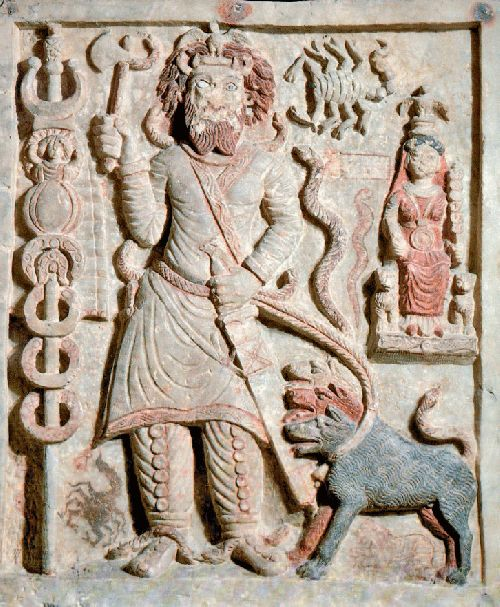
Relief of the god Nergal from Hatra.

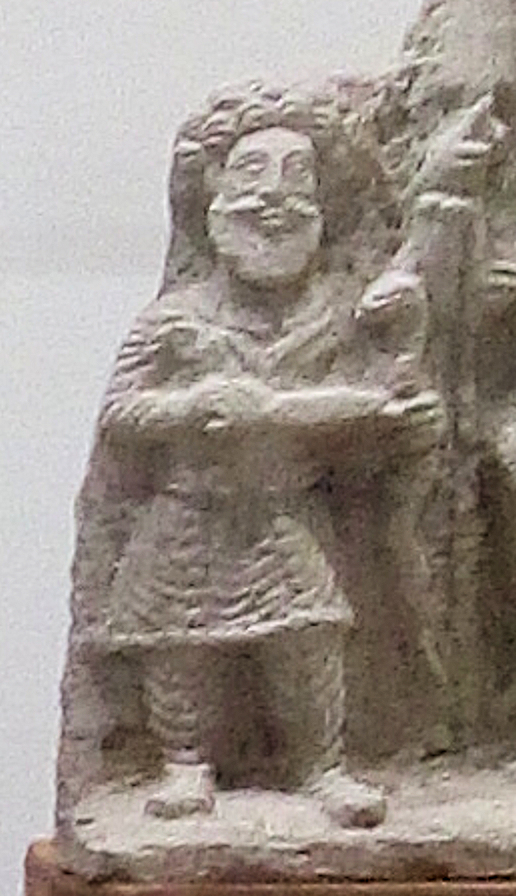
Hatra relief devotee.

== Modern Hatra ==
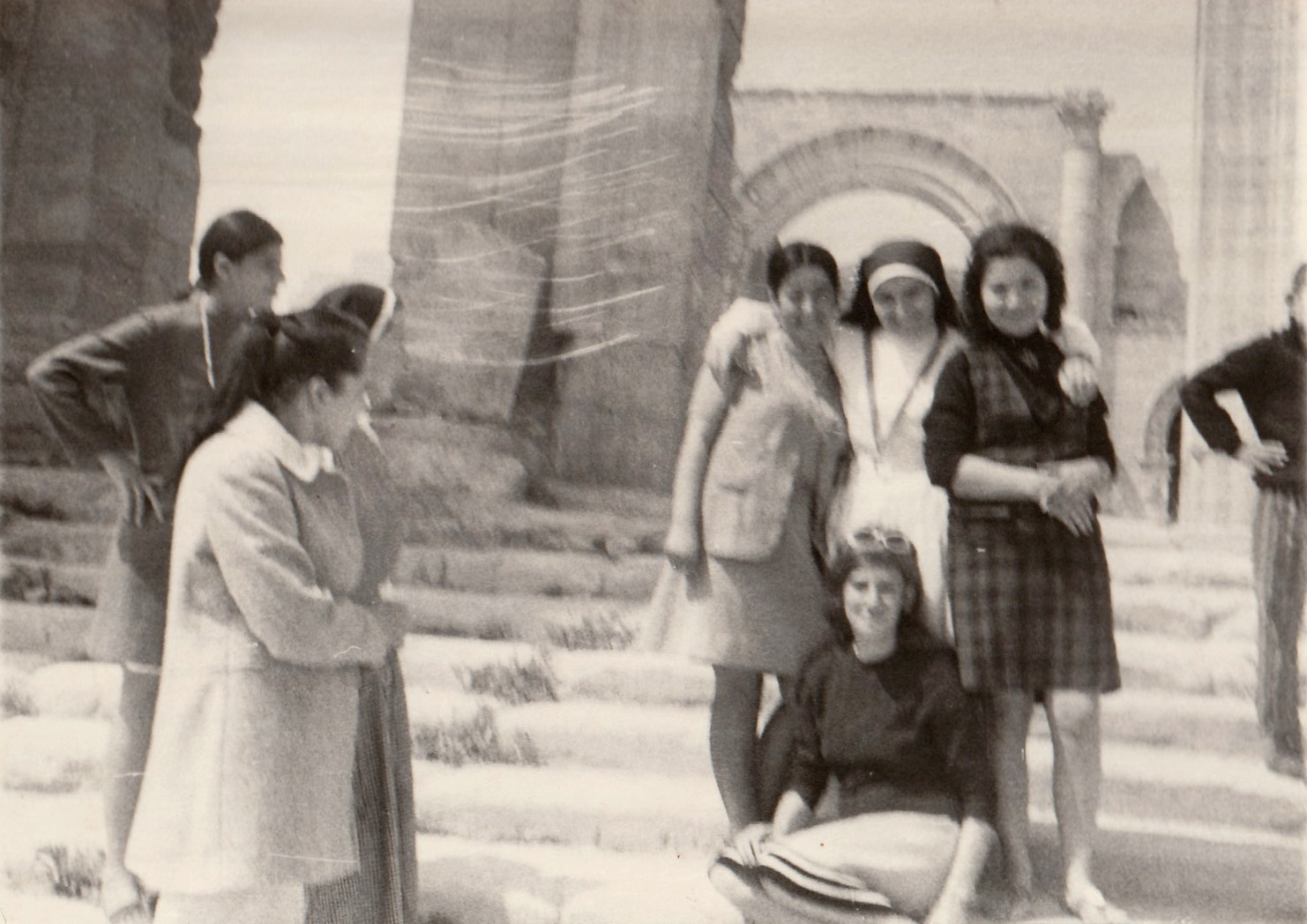
Hatra in the late 1960s. Towering columns and one of the site's preserved ancient temples are seen in the background.

Archaeological site of Hatra before destruction, 0:59, UNESCO video

Hatra was used as the setting for the opening scene in the 1973 film The Exorcist, and since 1985 has been a UNESCO World Heritage Site.

The site was first surveyed by Walter Andrae of the German excavation team working in Assur from 1906 to 1911. But systematic excavations have been undertaken only from 1951 by Iraqi archeologists. From the 1980s, the Italian Archaeological Expedition, directed by R. Ricciardi Venco (University of Turin), made major discoveries at Hatra. The excavations were focused on an important house ("Building A"), located close to the Temenos, and on deep soundings in the Temenos central area. Now the Expedition is active in different projects regarding the preservation and development of the archaeological site. In 1990, a Polish expedition of the Polish Centre of Mediterranean Archaeology University of Warsaw recorded and studied the city's defense walls.

In 2004, The Daily Telegraph stated "Hatra's finely preserved columns and statues make it one of the most impressive of Iraq's archaeological sites"

=== Restoration by Saddam Hussein ===
Saddam Hussein saw the site's Mesopotamian history as reflecting glory on himself, and sought to restore the site, and others in Ninevah, Nimrud, Ashur and Babylon, as a symbol of Arab achievement, spending more than US$80 million in the first phase of restoration of Babylon. Saddam Hussein demanded that new bricks in the restoration use his name (in imitation of Nebuchadnezzar) and parts of one restored Hatra temple have Saddam's name.

=== Partial destruction and looting by ISIL ===
Actions by the forces of the Islamic State of Iraq and the Levant, which occupied the area in mid-2014, were a major threat to Hatra. In early 2015 they announced their intention to destroy many artifacts, claiming that such "graven images" were un-Islamic, encouraged shirk (or polytheism), and could not be permitted to exist, despite the preservation of the site for 1,400 years by various Islamic regimes. ISIL militants pledged to destroy the remaining artifacts. Shortly thereafter, they released a video showing the destruction of some artifacts from Hatra. After the bulldozing of Nimrud on March 5, 2015, "Hatra of course will be next" said Abdulamir Hamdani, an Iraqi archaeologist from Stony Brook University. On March 7, Iraqi official sources reported ISIS had begun the demolishing the ruins of Hatra. A video released by ISIL during the next month showed the destruction of the monuments.

UNESCO and ISESCO issued a joint statement saying "With this latest act of barbarism against Hatra, (the IS group) shows the contempt in which it holds the history and heritage of Arab people."

The pro-Iraqi government Popular Mobilization Forces captured the city on 26 April 2017. A spokeswoman for the militias stated that ISIL had destroyed the sculptures and engraved images of the site, but its walls and towers were still standing though they contained holes and scratches received from ISIL bullets. PMF units also stated that the group had mined the site's eastern gates, thus temporarily preventing any assessment of damage by archaeologists. It was reported on 1 May that the site had suffered less damage than feared earlier. A journalist of EFE had earlier reported finding many destroyed statues, burnt buildings as well as signs of looting. Layla Salih, head of antiquities for Nineveh Governorate, stated that most of the buildings were intact and the destruction didn't compare with that of other archaeological sites of Iraq. A PMF commander also stated that the damage was relatively minor.

== Gallery ==
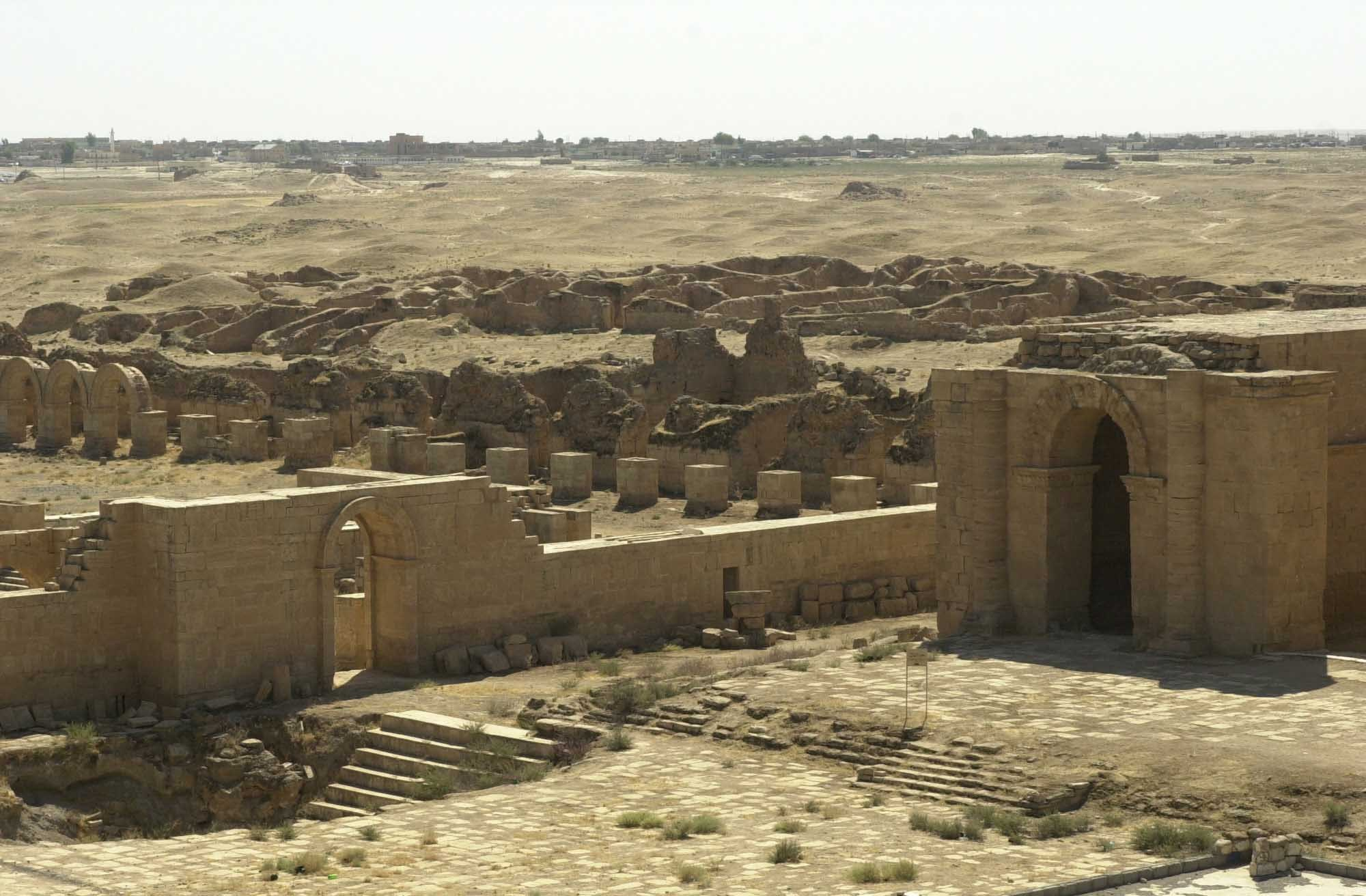
Remains of several temples and ancient walls (2004)

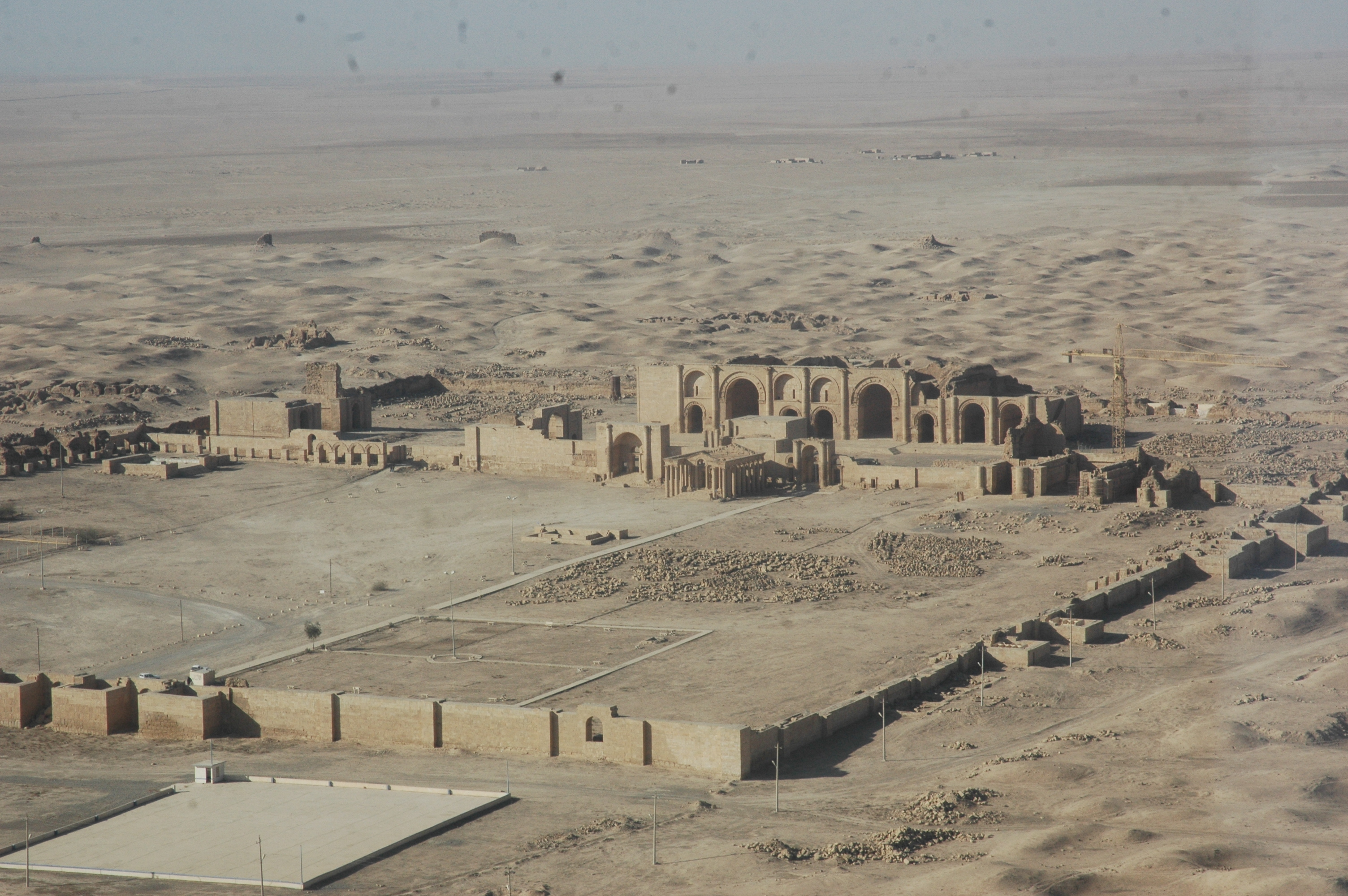
Elevated view of the site in 2007

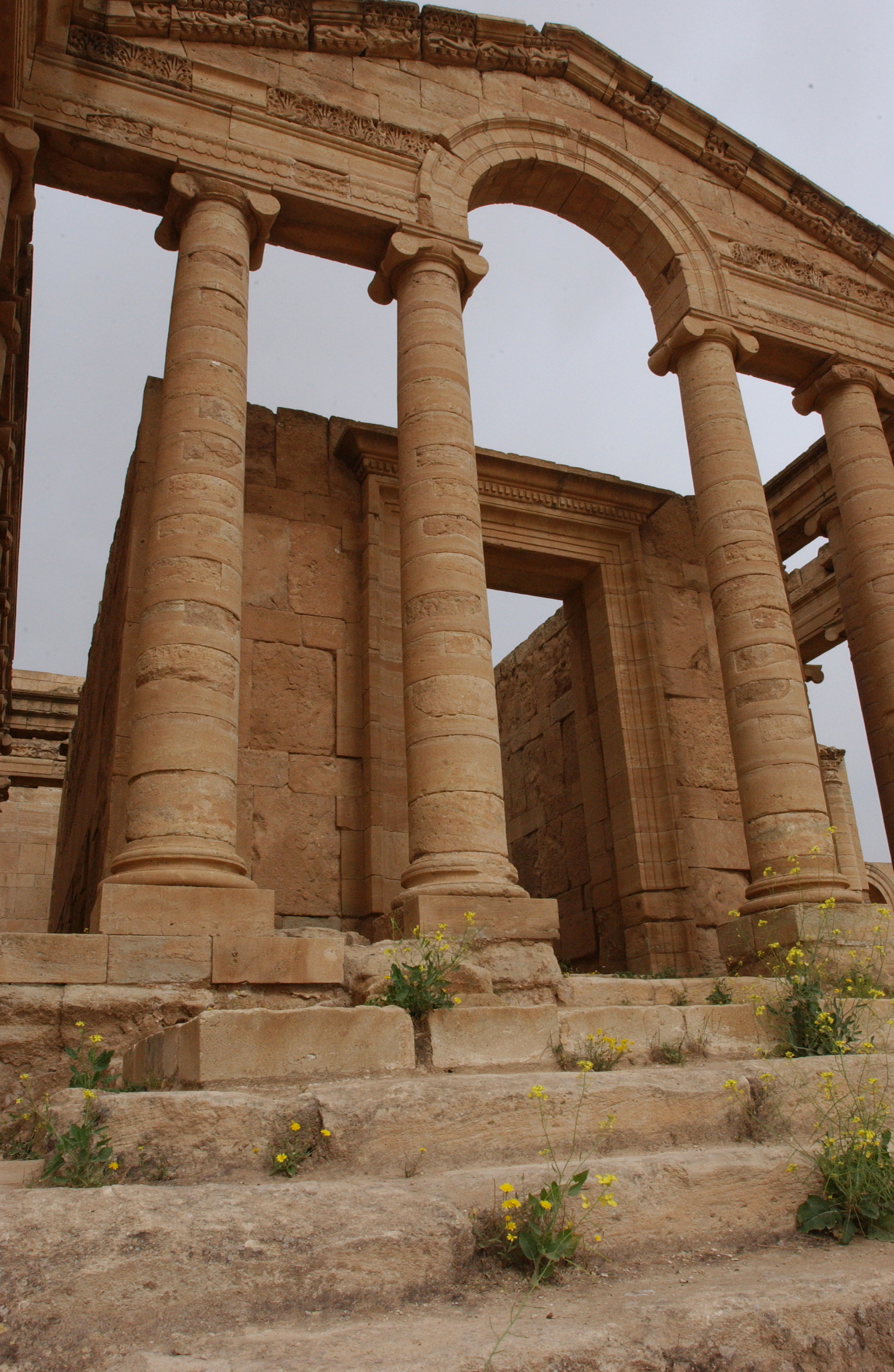
Temple facade (May 2006)

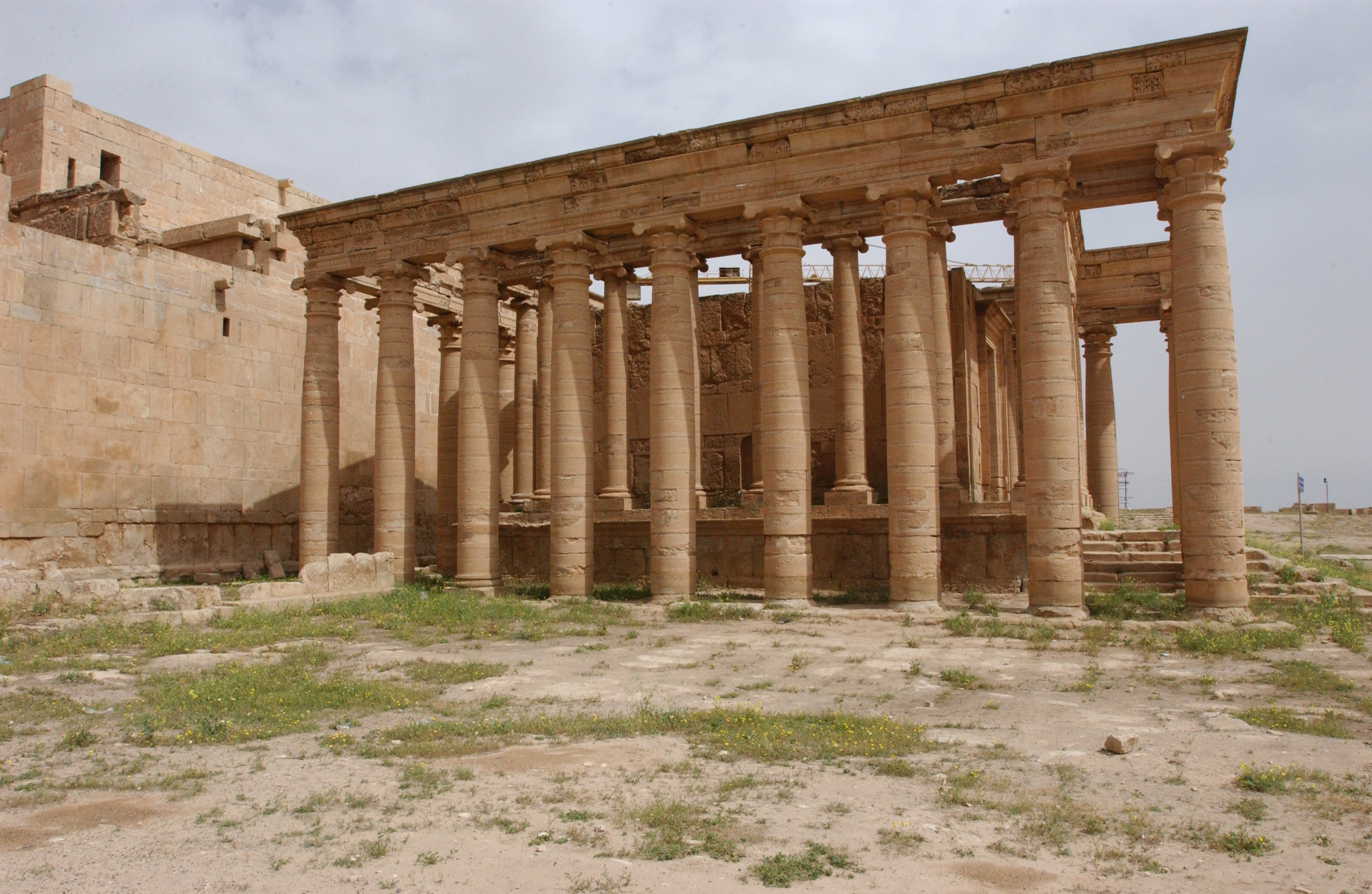
Southern exposure of the temple (May 2006)

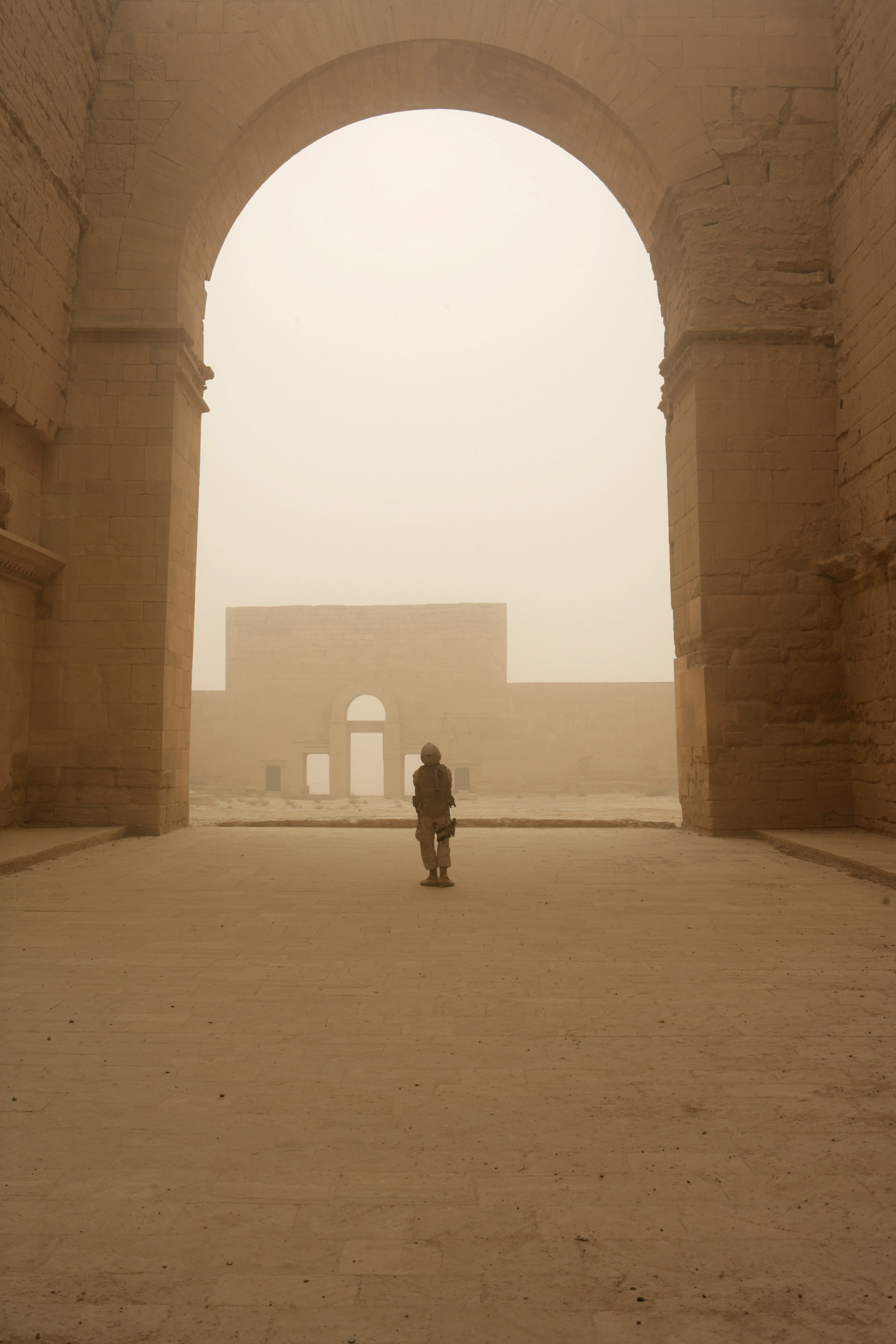
July 2008

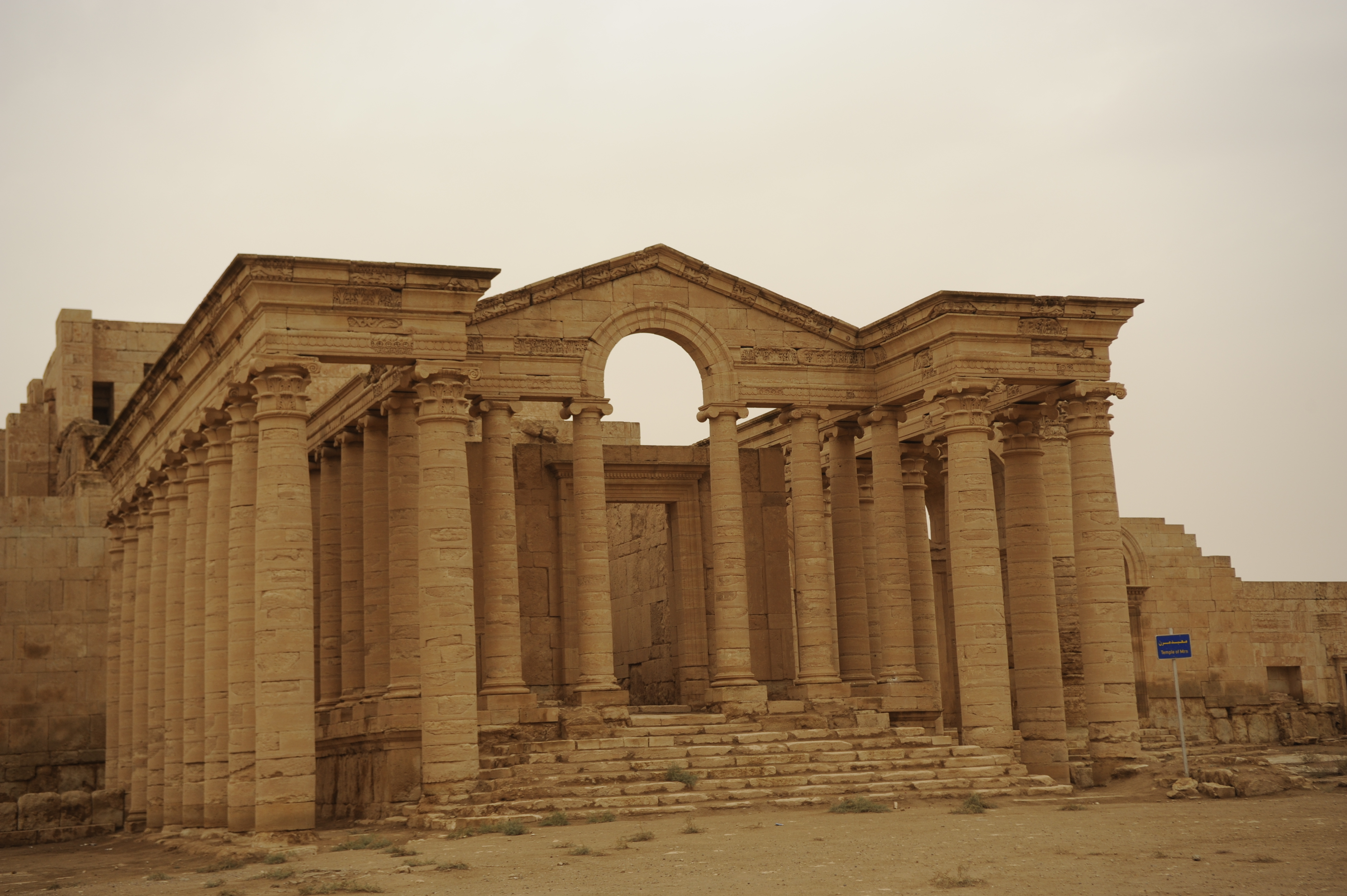
Marn Temple (November 2008)

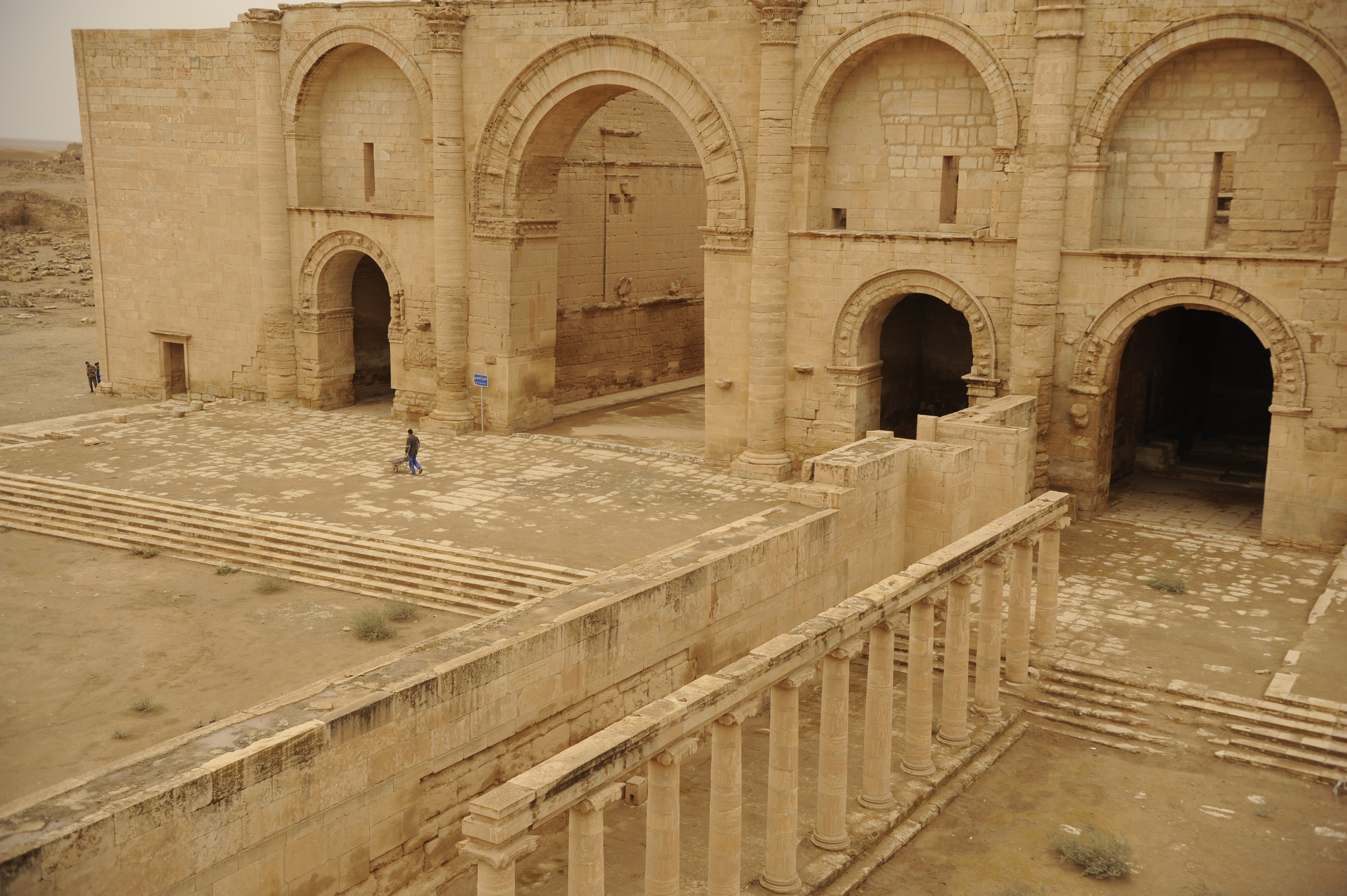
November 2008

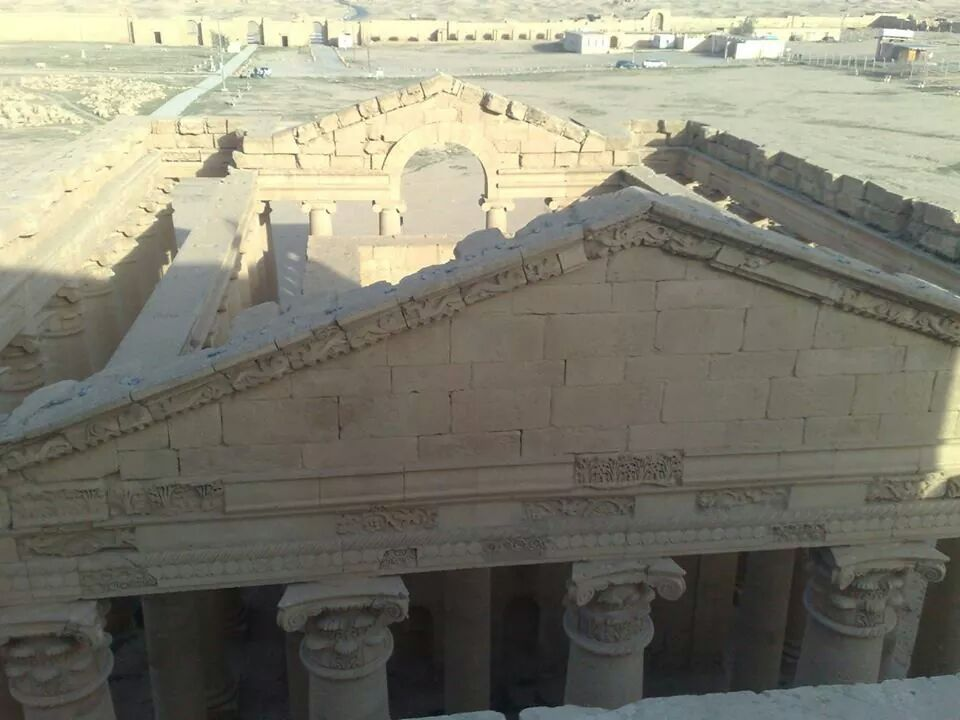
Elevated view of the temple (September 2014)

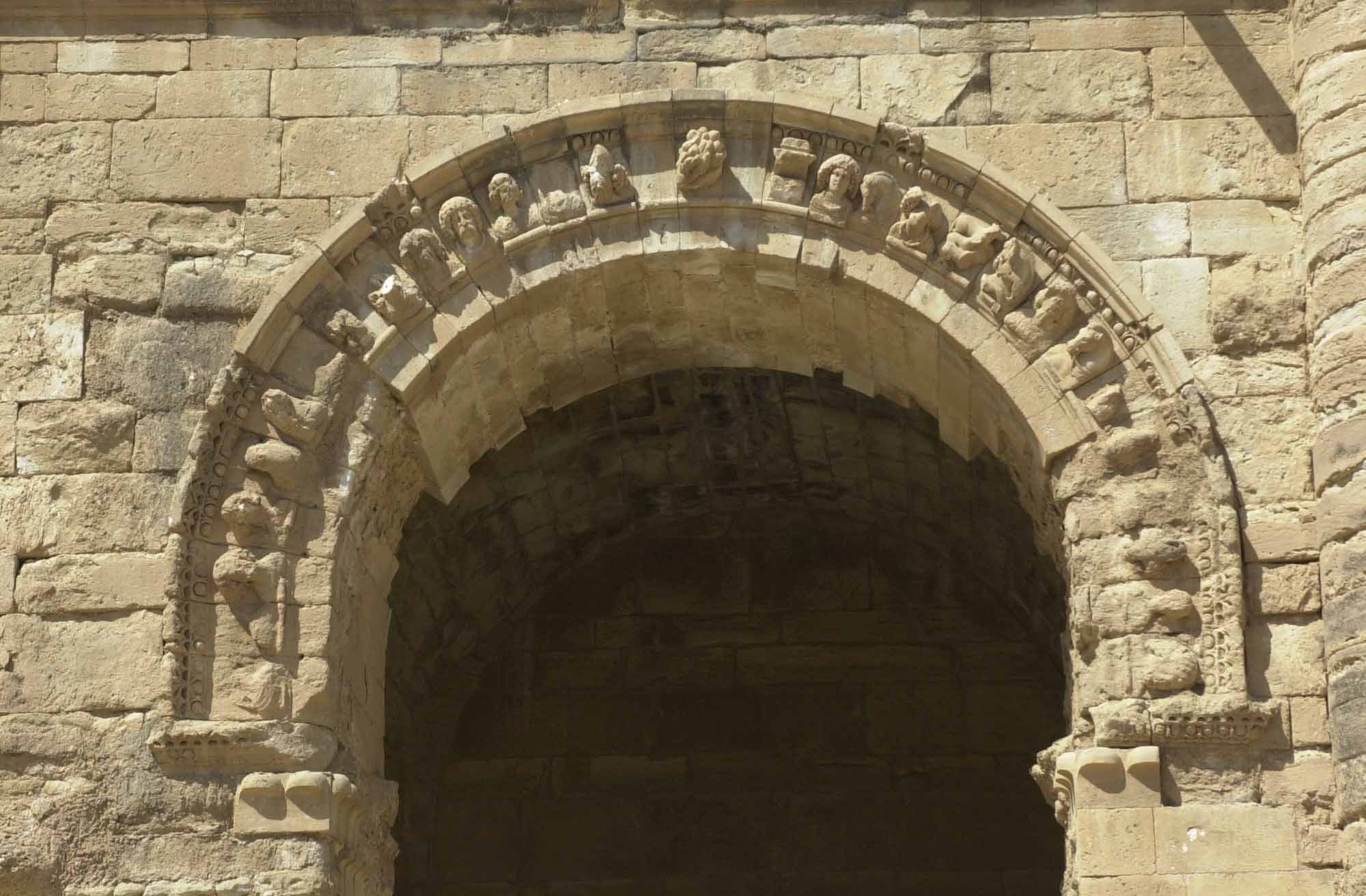
Detail of a temple, showing Hellenistic, Mesopotamian and Iranian architecture

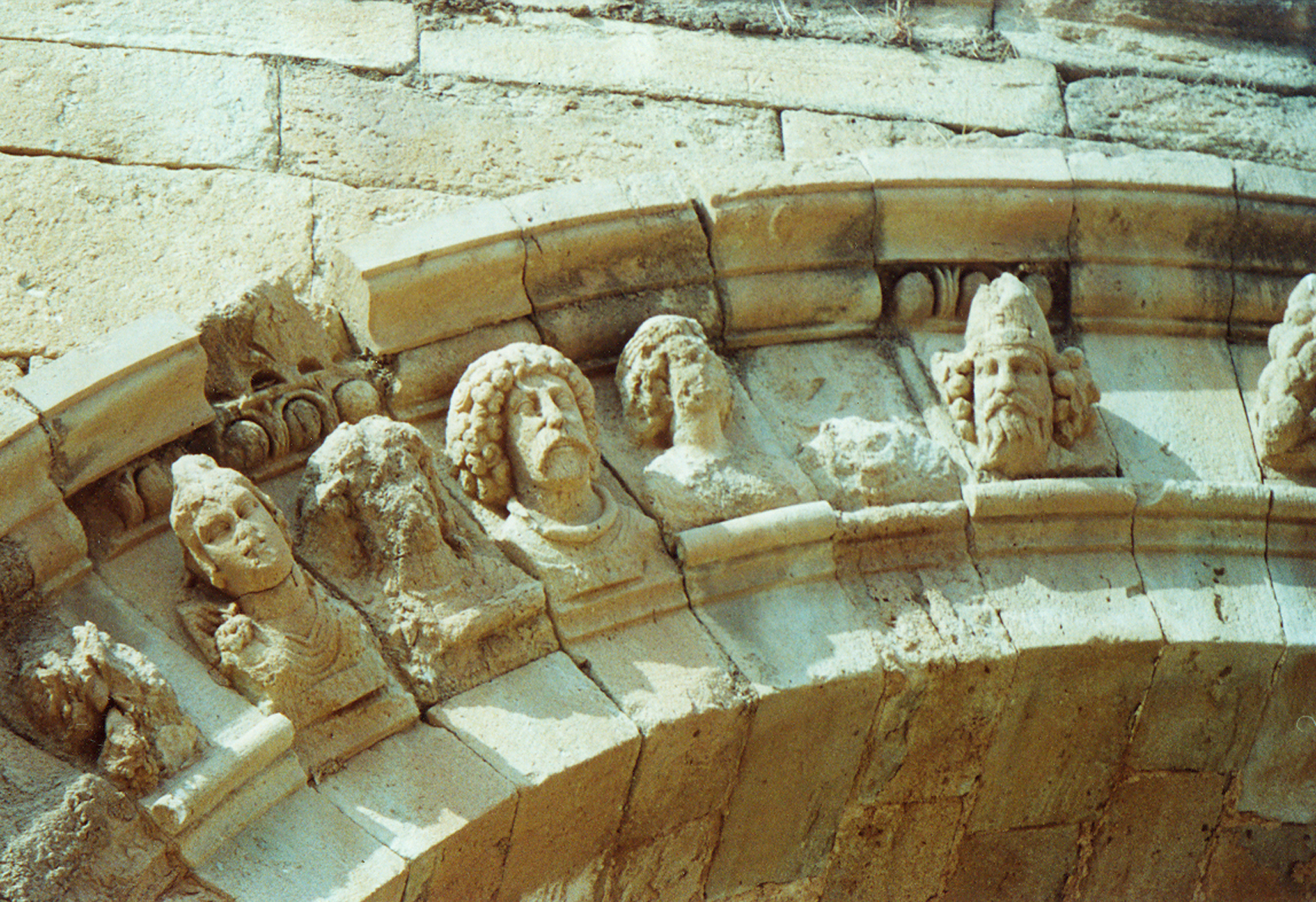
Decorated arch with faces

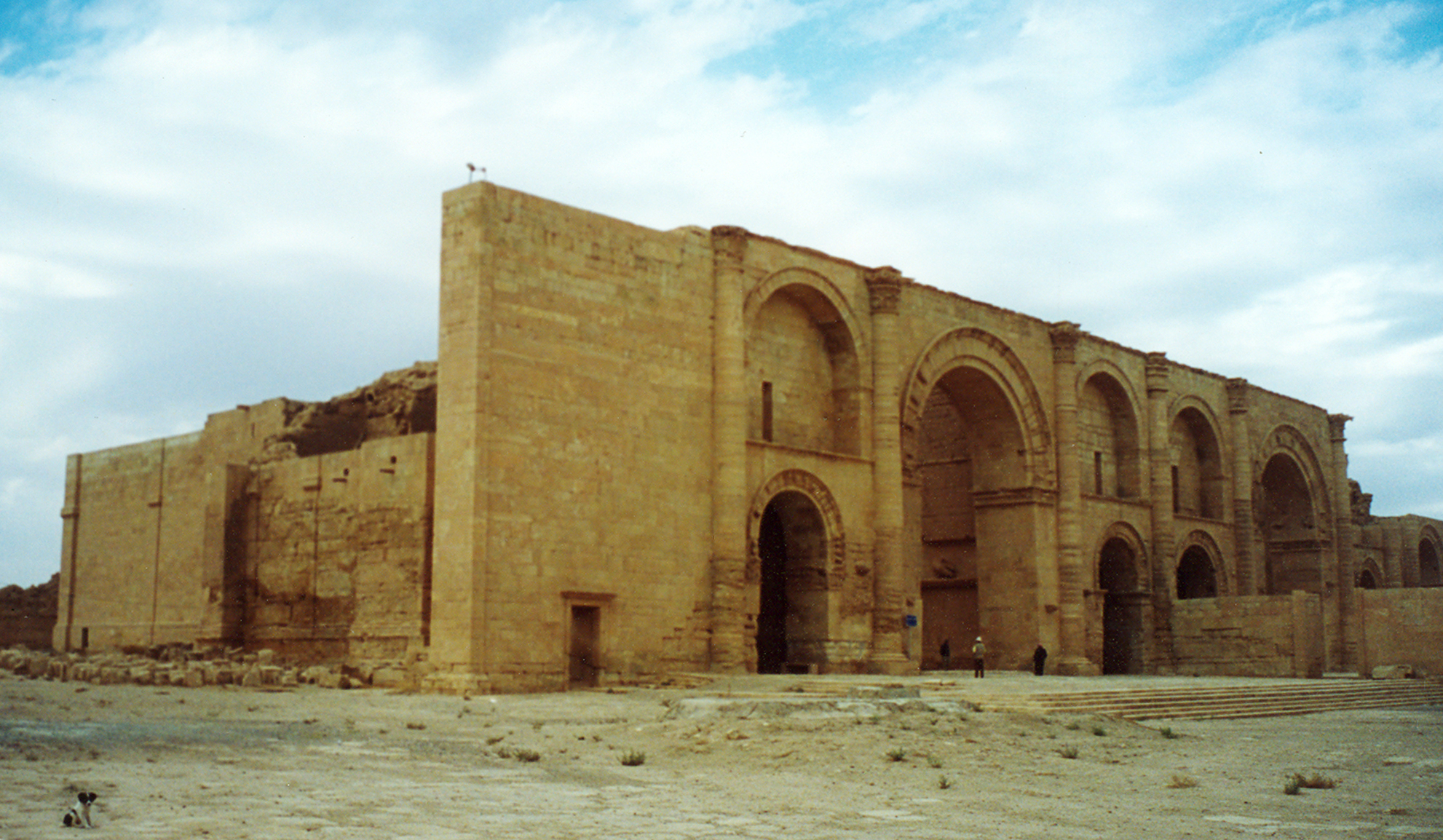
View of iwans

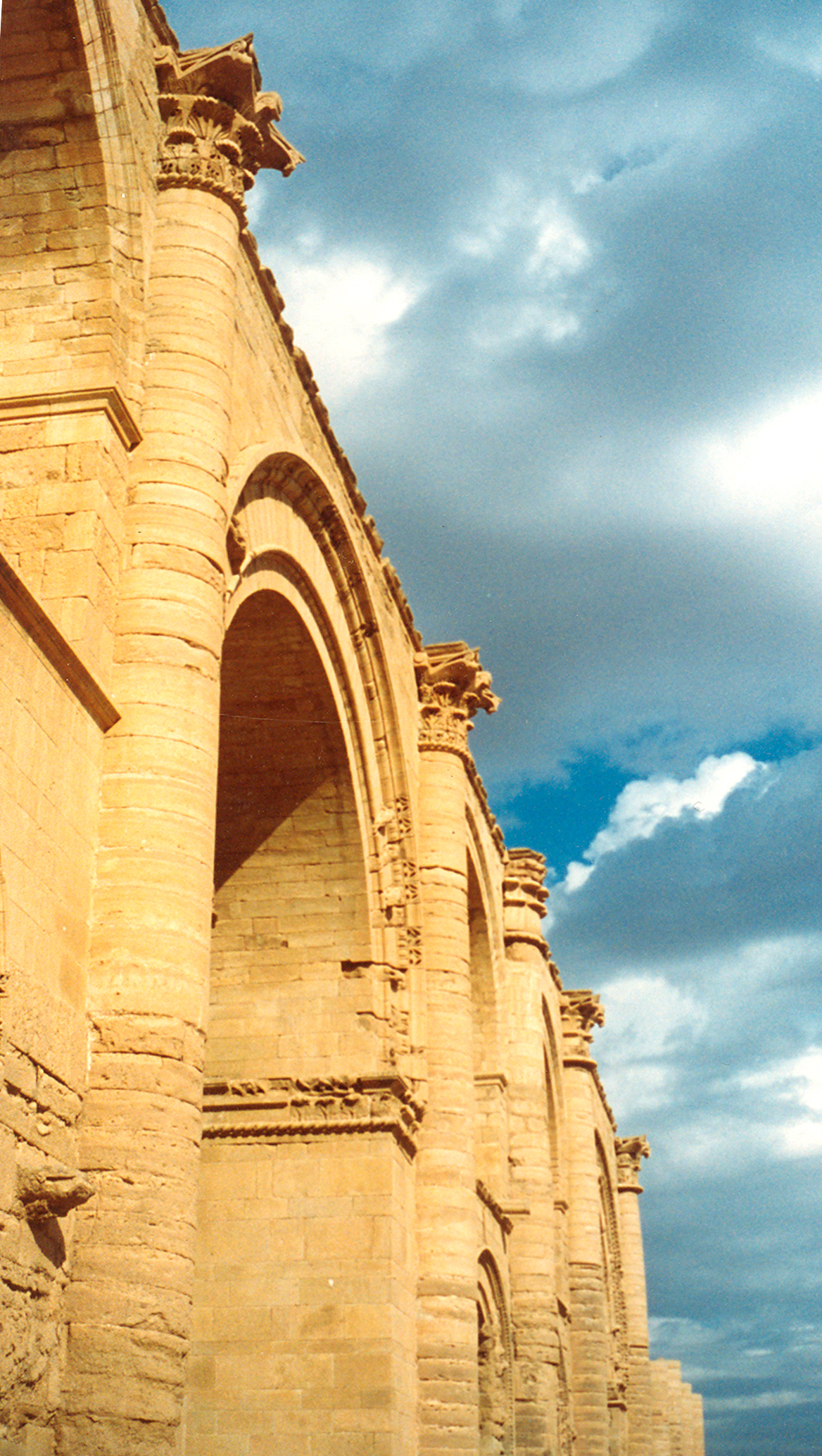
Closeup of an iwan

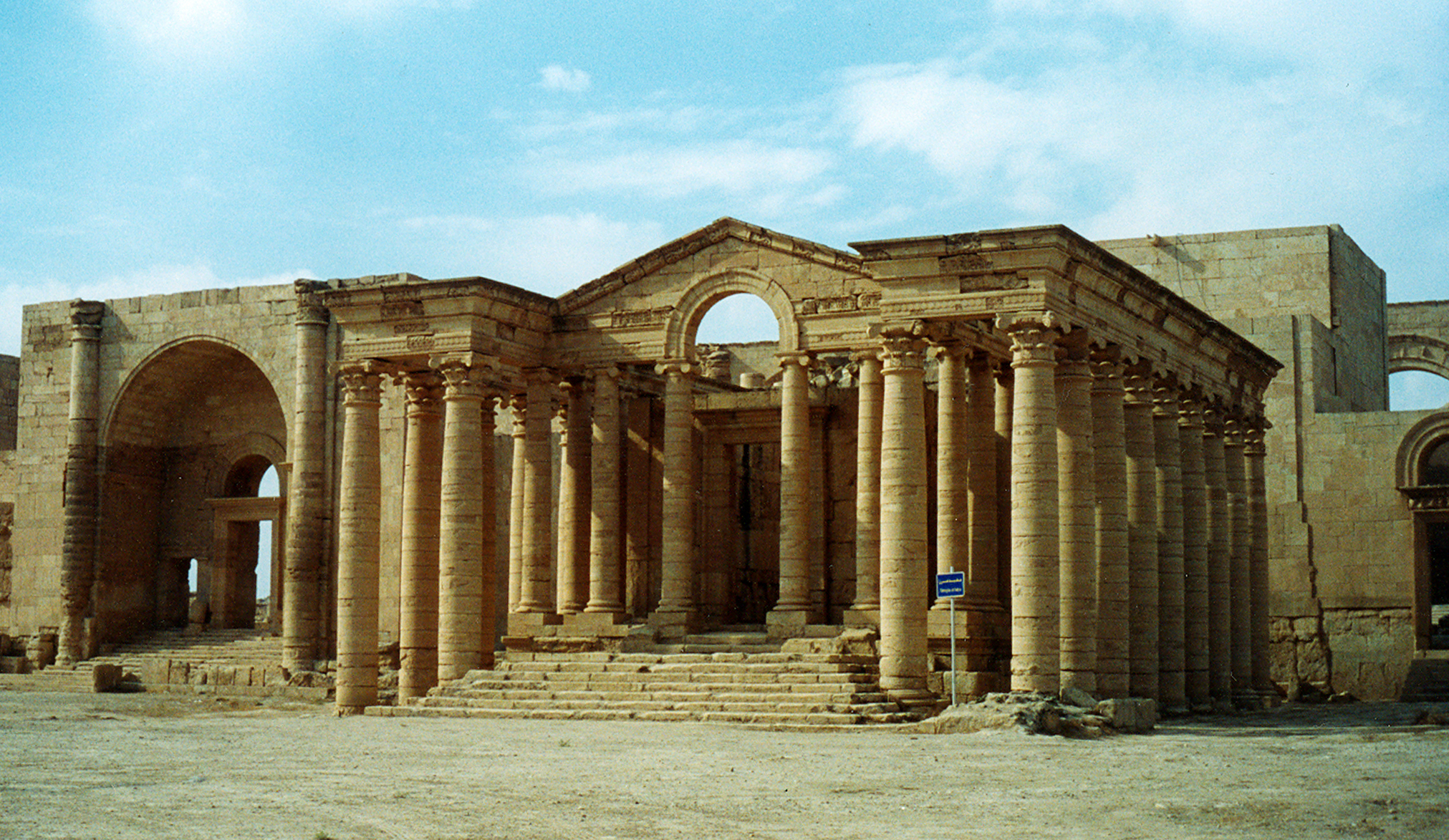
Facade of Temple

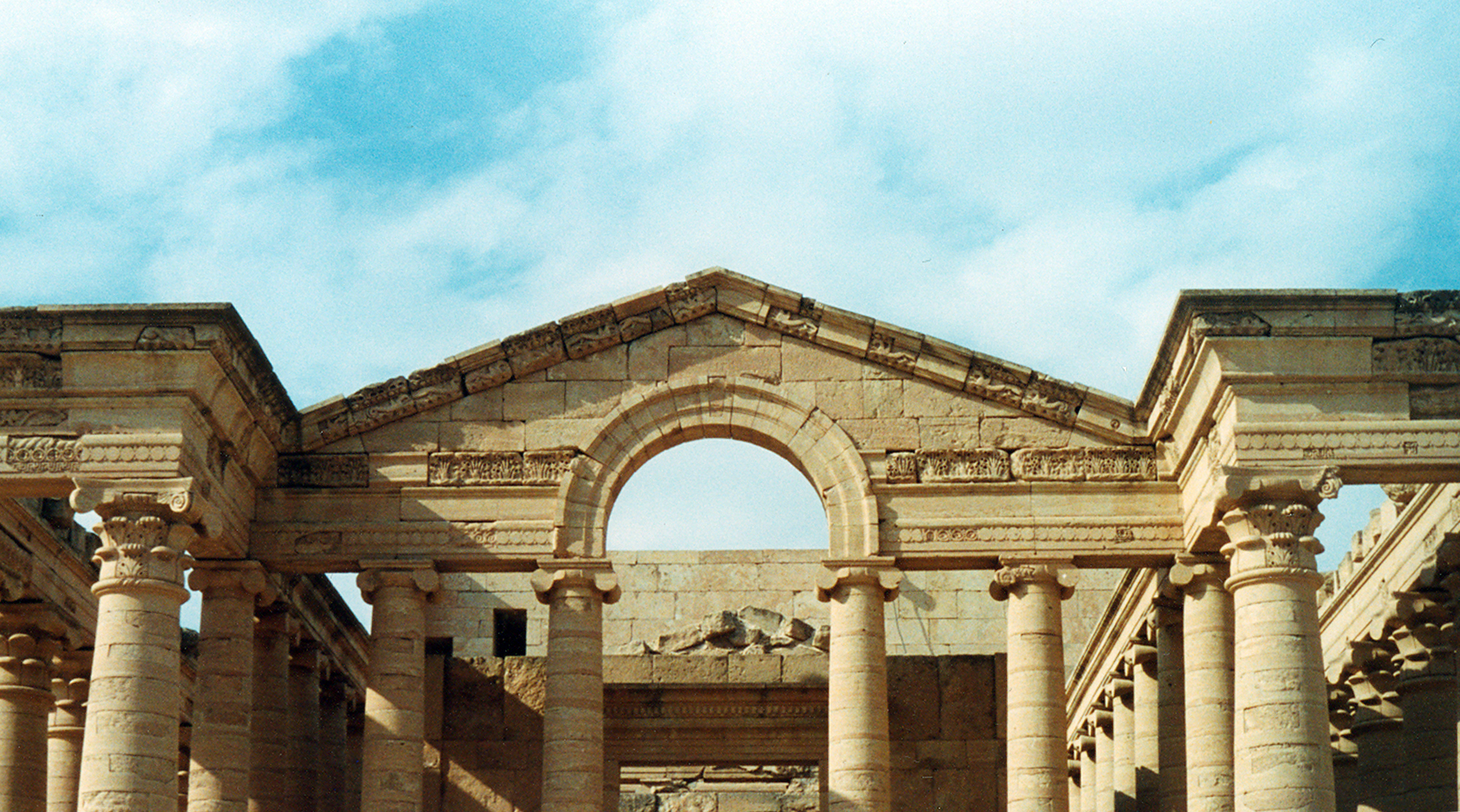
Arch of the temple

View of the Iwan in 2026

Hatra in 2026

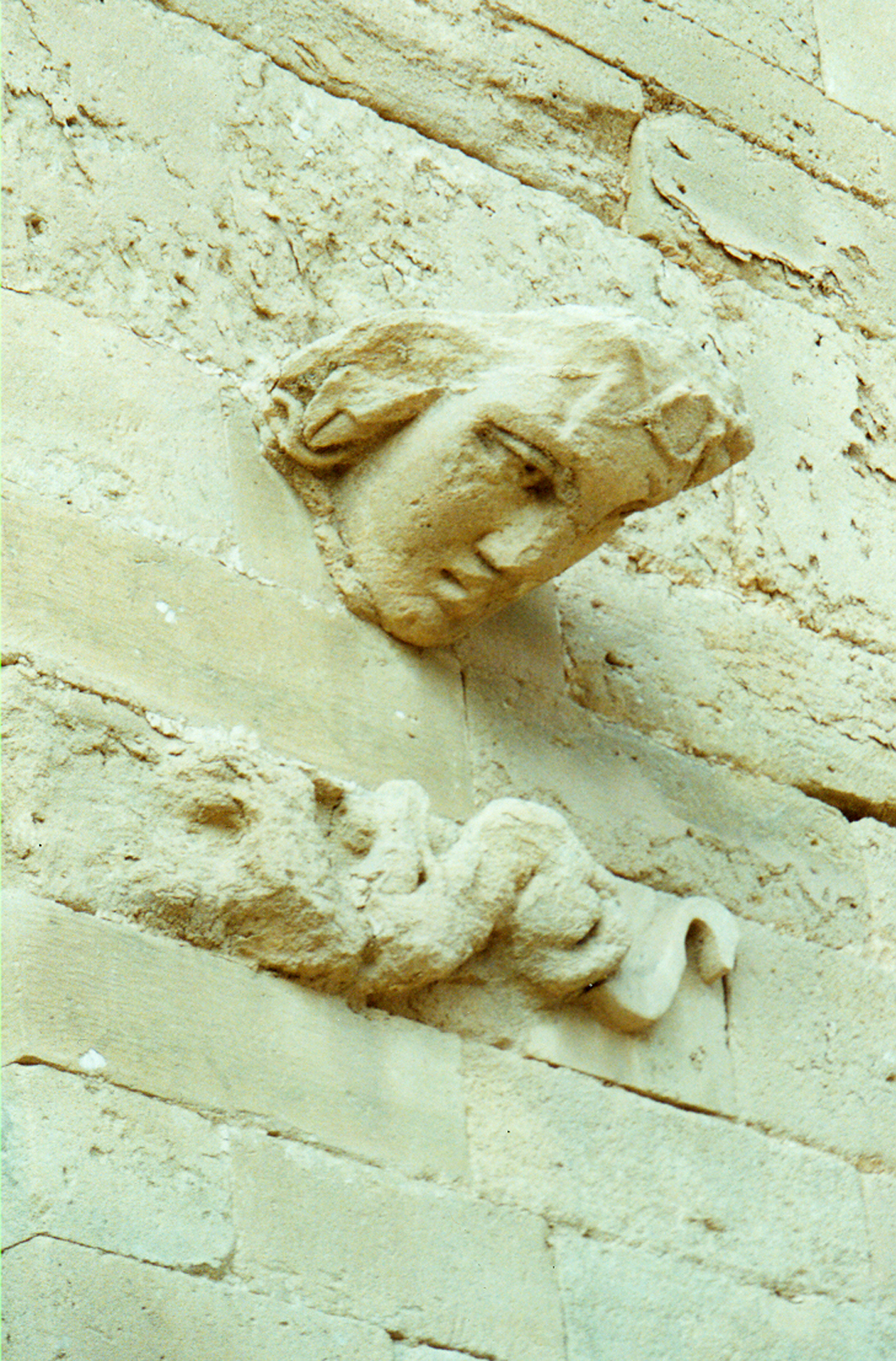
Protruded head on a wall

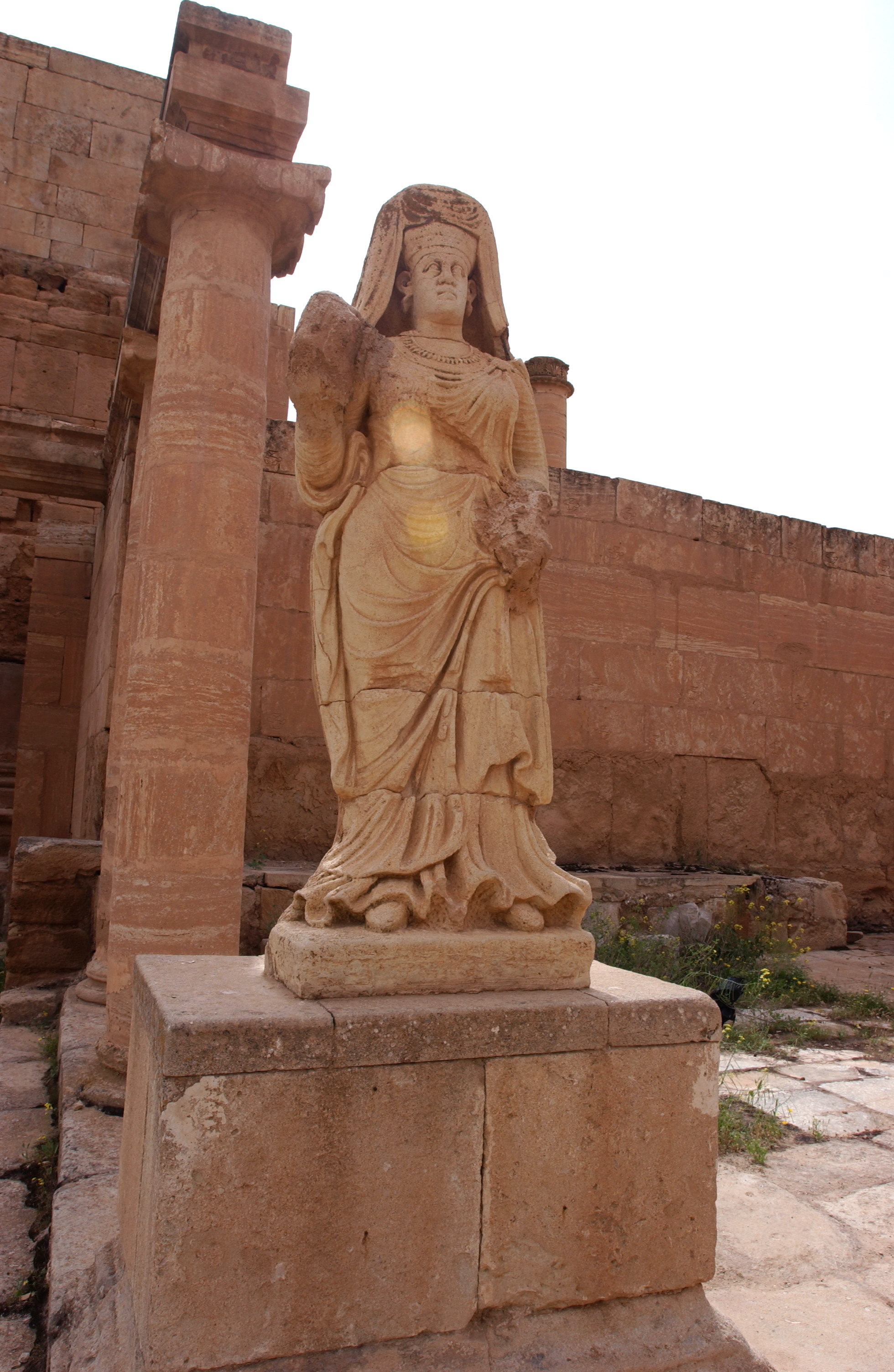
Statue of the Goddess Shahiro

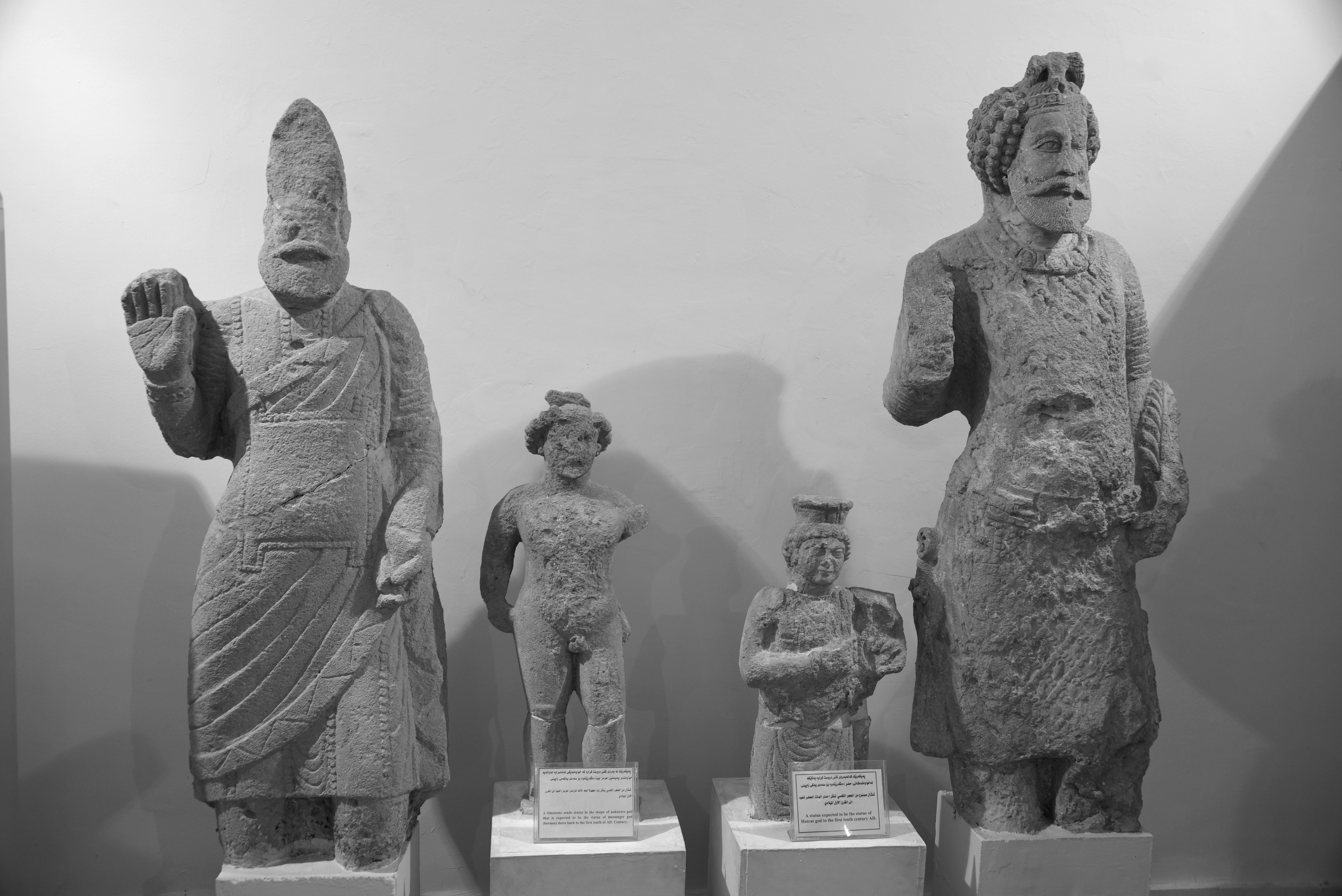
From left to right, an unidentified ruler, Hermes, a female deity, and Sanatruq I.From Hatra. Erbil Civilization Museum

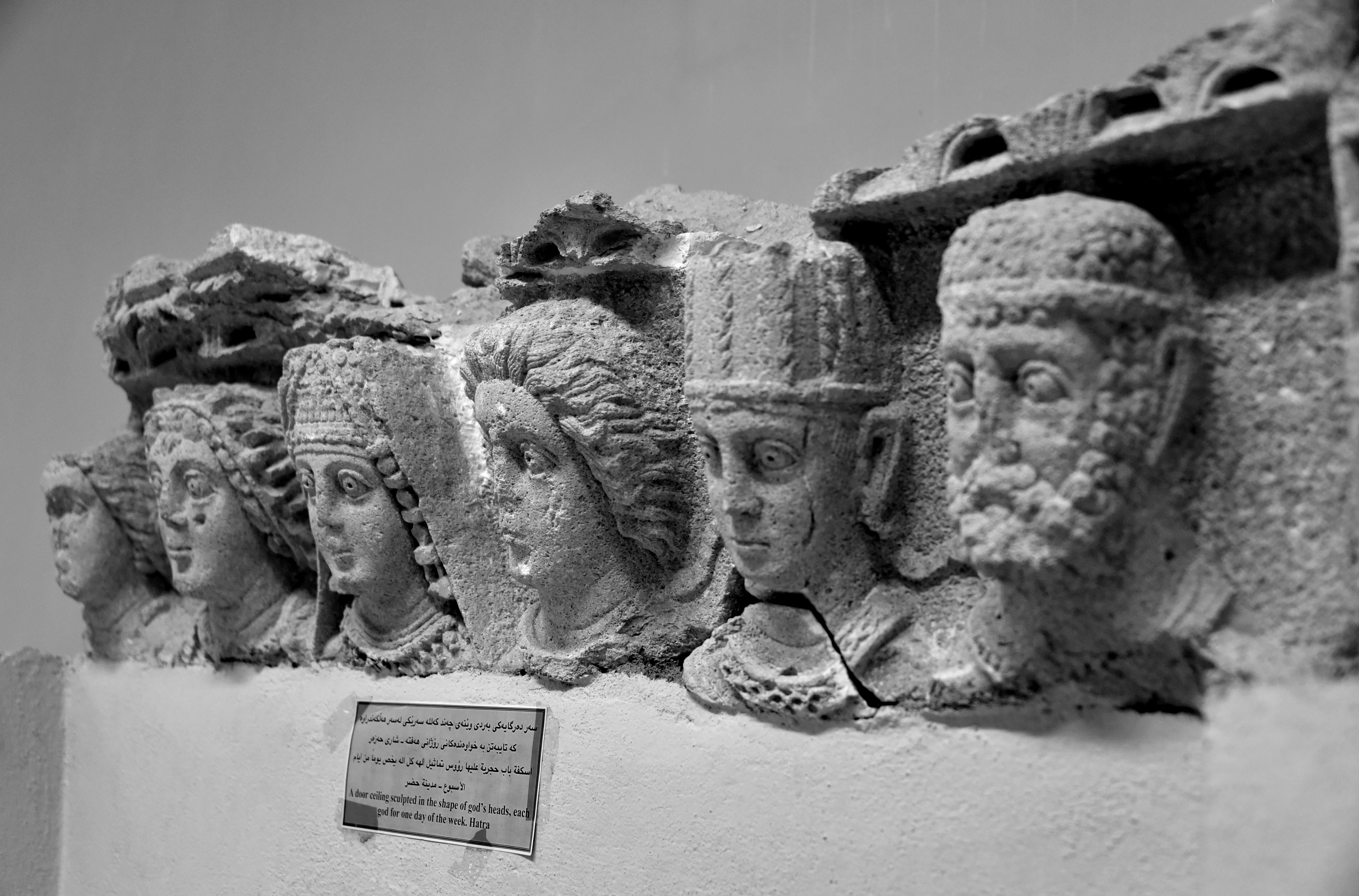
Door lintel from Hatra. 2nd-3rd century AD. Sulaymaniyah Museum, Iraqi Kurdistan

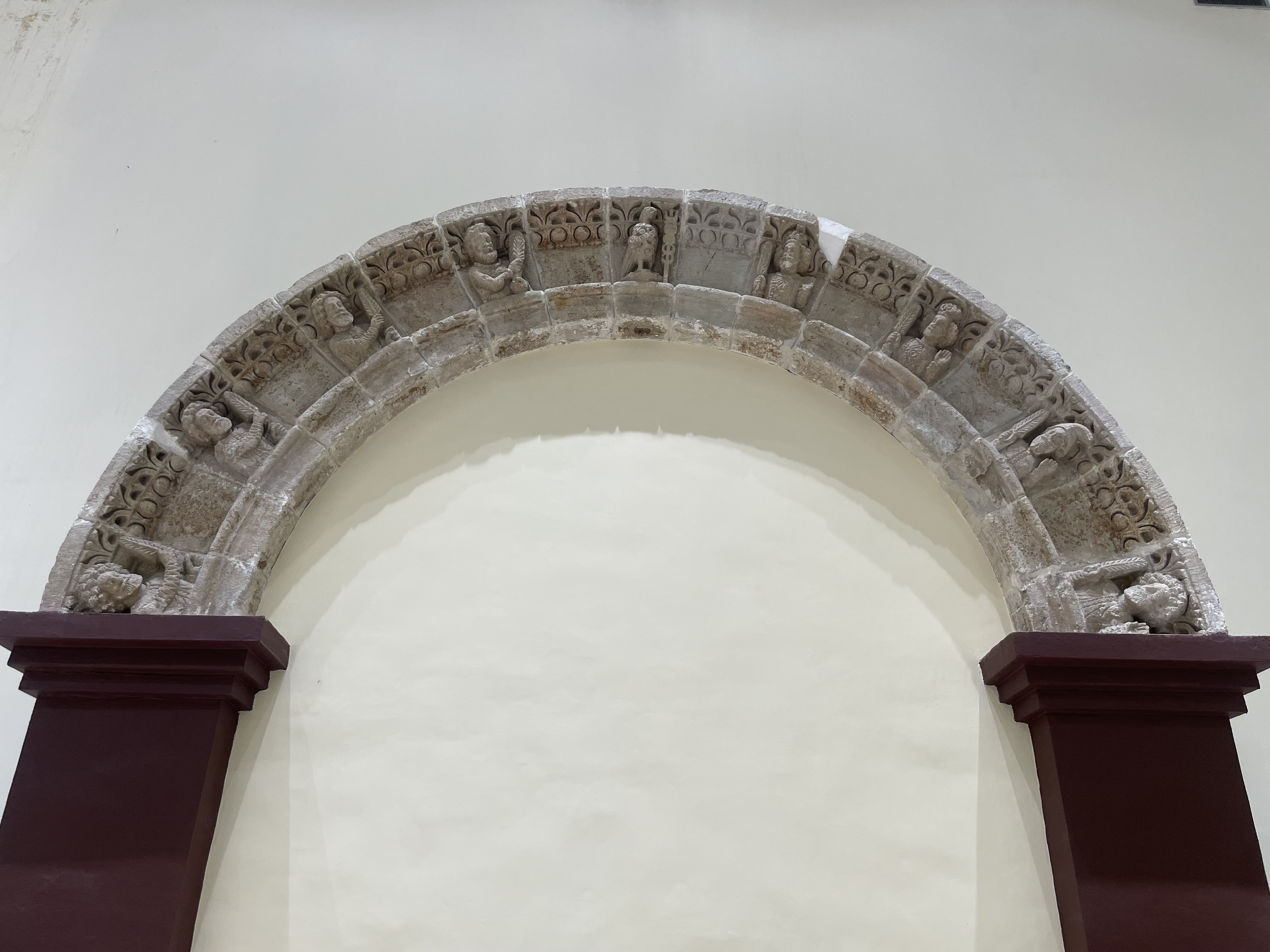
Monumental entrance arch from Hatra, now at the Iraqi National Museum

== Climate ==
Hatra has a hot semi-arid climate (Köppen climate classification BSh). Most rain falls in the winter. The average annual temperature in Hatra is 20.7 °C (69.3 °F). About 257 mm (10.12 in) of precipitation falls annually.

Climate data for Hatra (Al Hadar)
Month	Jan	Feb	Mar	Apr	May	Jun	Jul	Aug	Sep	Oct	Nov	Dec	Year
Mean daily maximum °C (°F)	12.8 (55.0)	15.8 (60.4)	19.8 (67.6)	25.3 (77.5)	33.0 (91.4)	39.0 (102.2)	42.3 (108.1)	42.1 (107.8)	37.9 (100.2)	31.0 (87.8)	22.5 (72.5)	14.8 (58.6)	28.0 (82.4)
Mean daily minimum °C (°F)	3.2 (37.8)	4.6 (40.3)	7.6 (45.7)	11.7 (53.1)	17.3 (63.1)	21.8 (71.2)	24.8 (76.6)	24.1 (75.4)	19.7 (67.5)	14.3 (57.7)	8.8 (47.8)	4.1 (39.4)	13.5 (56.3)
Average precipitation mm (inches)	43 (1.7)	39 (1.5)	49 (1.9)	36 (1.4)	13 (0.5)	0 (0)	0 (0)	0 (0)	0 (0)	8 (0.3)	25 (1.0)	44 (1.7)	257 (10.1)
Source: climate-data.org

== See also ==
- Hatran Aramaic
- Destruction of cultural heritage by the Islamic State
- Arch of Ctesiphon, sharing architectural features with structures at Hatra
