= Sumer (journal) =

Iraqi archaeological journal

Sumer is an academic journal which publishes on the archaeology, history, and ancient languages of Mesopotamia. It has been published since 1945 by the State Organization of Antiquities and Heritage of Iraq (formerly the Directorate-General of Antiquities). The journal takes its name from the ancient civilization of Sumer.

== Collection ==
The following volumes are available online:

=== 1940s ===
- Sumer, Vol. 1 (1945)
- Sumer, Vol. 2 (1946)
- Sumer, Vol. 3 (1947)
- Sumer, Vol. 4 (1948)
- Sumer, Vol. 5 (1949)

=== 1950s ===
- Sumer, Vol. 6 (1950)
- Sumer, Vol. 7 (1951)
- Sumer, Vol. 8 Iss. 1 (1952)
- Sumer, Vol. 8 Iss. 2 (1952)
- Sumer, Vol. 9 Iss. 1 (1953)
- Sumer, Vol. 9 Iss. 2 (1953)
- Sumer, Vol. 10 Iss. 1 (1954)
- Sumer, Vol. 10 Iss. 2 (1954)
- Sumer, Vol. 11 (1955)
- Sumer, Vol. 12 (1956)
- Sumer, Vol. 13 (1957)
- Sumer, Vol. 14 (1958)
- Sumer, Vol. 15 (1959)

=== 1960s ===
- Sumer, Vol. 16 (1960)
- Sumer, Vol. 17 (1961)
- Sumer, Vol. 18 (1962)
- Sumer, Vol. 19 (1963)
- Sumer, Vol. 20 (1964)

== See also ==
- Near Eastern archaeology
