= Sasanian campaign of Severus Alexander =

Campaign of Severus Alexander against the Sasanian Empire

Sassanid campaign of Severus Alexander
- Part of Roman–Persian Wars
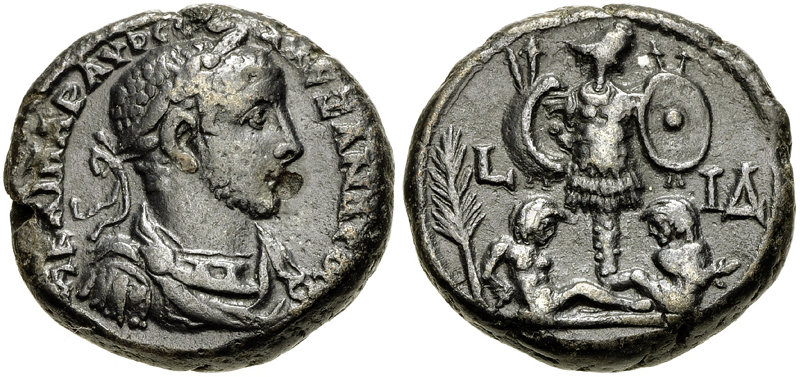
- Coin minted in 234/235, celebrating the Persian Victory of Alexander Severus.
Date	From 232
Location	Armenia, Media, Mesopotamia and Osroene
Result	Uncertain

Belligerents
Roman Empire	Sasanian Empire

Commanders and leaders
Severus Alexander	Ardashir I

Strength
About 150,000	About 150,000

Casualties and losses
Numerous, equal to the Persian ones	Numerous, equal to the Roman ones

The Sassanid campaign of Alexander Severus was an episode of the Roman–Sasanian Wars (224-363) that saw the Roman Empire ruled by Emperor Alexander Severus (222-235) confront the dominance of the Sasanids, led by Ardashir I (224-241): the war was fought between 230 and 232, originating from an attempted Sasanian expansion into the eastern Roman provinces, and resolved with a return to the status quo ante.

== Historical context ==
Between 224 and 226/227, an important episode changed the fate of relations between the Roman and Persian Empires: in the East, the last Parthian emperor, Artabanus IV, was overthrown after being defeated in "three battles," and the insurgent, Ardashir I, founded the Sasanian dynasty, destined to be the eastern adversary of the Romans until the 7th century. Specifically, between about 229 and 232, Sasanids and Romans clashed for the first time.

On the Roman front, however, the new Severan dynasty that ruled the Roman Empire between the end of the 2nd and the first decades of the 3rd century (from 193 to 235, with a brief interruption during the reign of Macrinus between 217 and 218), and whose progenitor had been Septimius Severus, was now in the hands of a young emperor, Alexander Severus, who a few years later would be killed, proving to be the last descendant. The new dynasty had been born on the ashes of a long period of civil wars, where three other contenders besides Septimius Severus (Didius Julianus, Pescennius Niger, and Clodius Albinus) had faced each other.

=== Casus belli ===
The casus belli was the claim by the Sasanids, who considered themselves descendants of the Persians, to possession of the entire Achaemenid Empire, including the territories, now Roman, of Asia Minor and the Near East, as far as the Aegean Sea.

[Ardashir] believing that the entire continent in front of Europe, separated by the Aegean Sea and the Propontid, and the region called Asia belonged to him by divine right, he intended to reclaim it for the Persian Empire. He declared that all the countries in the area, between Ionia and Caria, had been ruled by Persian satraps, starting from Cyrus the Great, who first transferred the kingdom from Media to the Persians, to Darius III, the last of the Persian rulers, whose kingdom was destroyed by Alexander the Great. So according to him it was right to restore and reunite for the Persians, the kingdom they had previously possessed. As a result of this news that came through dispatches from the governors of the East, Alexander Severus was greatly disturbed by the sudden and unexpected news, especially since it came to him after spending a boyhood in an era of peace, and a life in the comforts of a great city [such as Rome]. Therefore, before doing anything, after consulting his advisers, he decided to send an embassy to the "Great King" to try to stop the barbarian's invasion and assess what expectations there were through this letter.

— Herodian, History of the Empire after Marcus Aurelius, VI, 2.2-3.

According to Herodian's account, Alexander proposed to Ardashir that the status quo be maintained, reminding him of Roman victories over the Persians (from Augustus, to Trajan, Lucius Verus, and on to Septimius Severus), but it had no effect on the Sasanian ruler, who soon afterwards took to the battlefield and in 230, penetrated the Roman province of Mesopotamia trying, unsuccessfully, to conquer Nisibis and making several raids into Syria and Cappadocia.

== Forces in the field ==
=== Sasanids ===
It is not known precisely how many and what armies were fielded by the Sasanids. Cassius Dio recounts that it was certainly a large army, ready to terrorize not only the Roman province of Mesopotamia, but also that of Syria, west of the Euphrates. Herodian adds that it was equal to the Roman one, thus around 150,000 armed men or perhaps more. The Historia Augusta speaks of the employment in battle of 700 war elephants, 1,800 scythed chariots, and 120,000 cataphracts.

What we know of this army is that it was not permanent like the Roman army, with professional soldiers paid regularly for their work. There was only an eventual division of the final spoils. Rather, there was a system similar to the feudal one, where for each campaign it was necessary to assemble an army from time to time, composed of nobles at the head of their "clans," subjected then under the command of a prince of the royal house. There were therefore no officers expert in weapons who served continuously, nor was there a lasting system of recruitment, as there were no permanent military units, although there were many nobles at the disposal of the Sasanian army. For these reasons, they often hired mercenary armies. They mainly used the bow and the horse in warfare, unlike the Romans who favored infantry, so much so that the Sasanians are said to have grown up from childhood, riding and shooting with arrows, constantly living for war and hunting.

It should be added, however, that unlike the Arsacid Parthians, they tried to keep their contingents under arms for more years during major military campaigns, speeding up the recruitment of their armies, as well as better assimilating the siege techniques of their Roman opponents, which they never really learned from their predecessors.

=== Romans ===
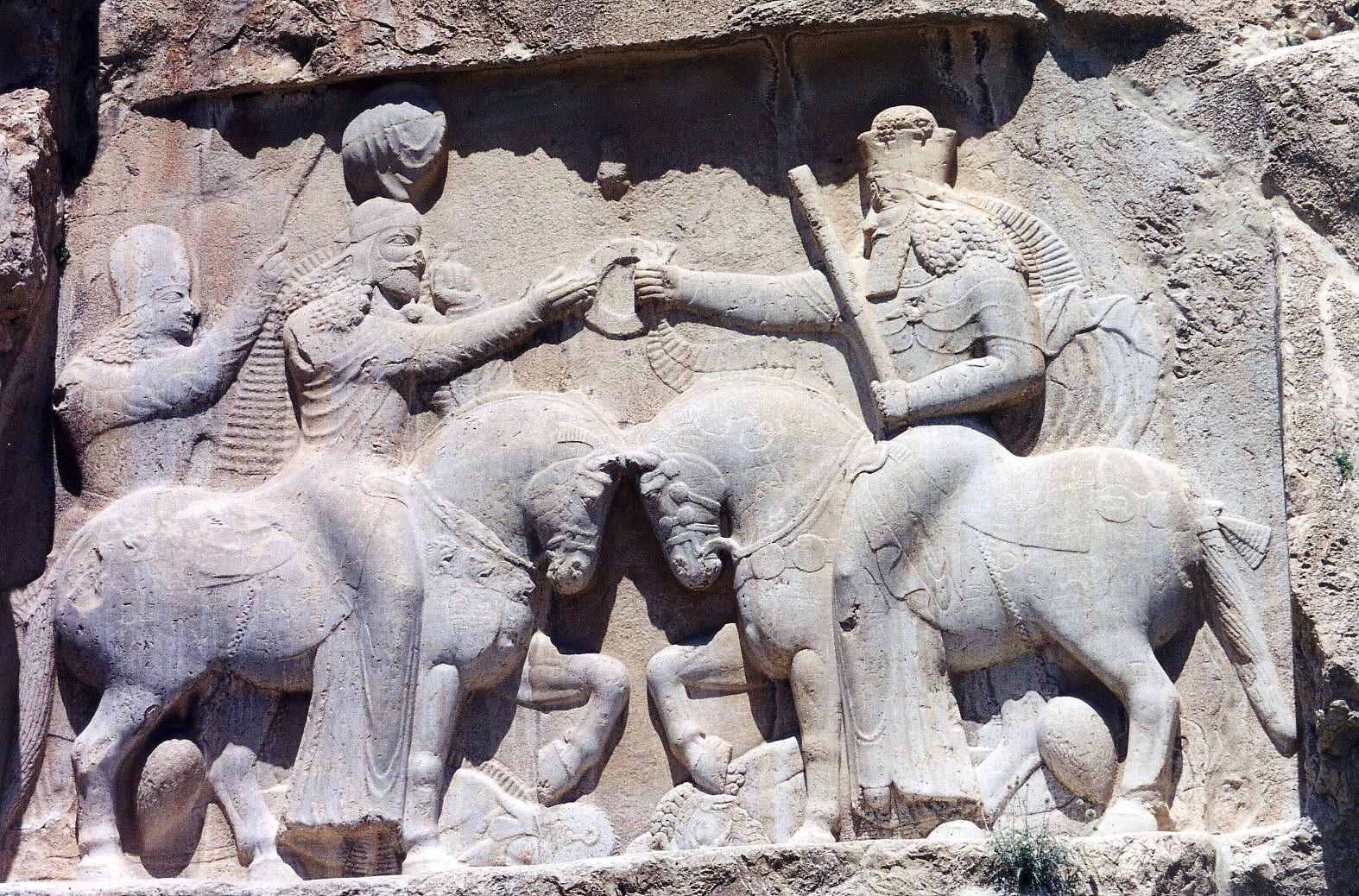
Ardashir I, first ruler of the Sasanian Persians, is crowned ruler by the god Ahura Mazda, thus succeeding the Parthian dynasty.

It is known that for the Romans, the forces put in charge were the legions and auxiliary troops stationed along the eastern limes, which unfortunately, according to Cassius Dio, were not in an acceptable state of preparedness, discipline, and morale to cope with this new eastern danger, so much so that they thoughtlessly put to death their own governor of the province of Mesopotamia, Flavius Heracleo. Below is a list of the legions and their respective fortresses:

No. of legionary fortresses of the eastern limes	Legionary unit	Ancient location	Modern location	Roman province
1	Legio XV Apollinaris	Satala	Sadagh	Cappadocia
2	Legio XII Fulminata	Melitene	Melitene	Cappadocia
3	Legio III Parthica	Nisibis	Nusaybin	Mesopotamia
4	Legio I Parthica	Singara	Sinjar	Mesopotamia and Osrhoene
5	Legio IV Scythica	Zeugma	Belkis	Syria Coele
6	Legio XVI Flavia Firma	Sura	Sura	Syria Coele
7	vexill. Legio II Parthica	Apamea		Syria Coele
8	Legio III Gallica	Danaba	Mehin	Syria Phoenicia
9	Legio X Fretensis	Aelia Capitolina	Jerusalem	Syria Palaestina
10	Legio VI Ferrata	Caparcotna	Kfar Otnay	Syria Palaestina
11	Legio III Cyrenaica	Bostra	Bosra	Arabia Petraea

These legions, already present on the eastern front, were joined by others from the Danube and other western regions such as:

- I Adiutrix, II Adiutrix, II Parthica? (or was already present on the eastern front, at Apamea), VII Claudia Pia Fidelis, XI Claudia Pia Fidelis, XXX Ulpia Traiana Victrix, and perhaps IV Italica, formed around 231 by Alexander Severus;

as well as some vexillationes from other fronts such as:

- I Minervia, II Italica (?), II Traiana (?), III Augusta, III Italica, Legio IV Flavia Felix, Legio V Macedonica, Legio X Gemina, Legio XIII Gemina and XXII Primigenia.

The total forces fielded by the Roman Empire along the entire eastern limes may have been around 150,000 Roman soldiers involved or perhaps more (including 30,000 phalangarii, from six legions), (Note: The forces estimated at 150,000 soldiers on the Roman side, means considering that a large part of these remained to defend the imperial borders (at least half, amounting to 75,000 soldiers), while the remainder (the other half), may have constituted the three "invasion" armies: a first one directed into Media-Armenia (20,000 soldiers), a second one along the Euphrates (another 20,000 soldiers) and the central one of Alexander Severus (approx. 35,000 more).) half of whom were legionaries, the remainder auxiliaries.

== Stages of the war ==
There are two contrasting accounts of Alexander Severus' Sasanian campaign: one by Herodian, who has no qualms about showing the Roman emperor's mistakes in the conduct of the war and describes a negative situation for the Romans, only to later recount that the Sasanians accepted the status quo ante bellum; on the other hand, in the Historia Augusta, Aurelius Victor's Caesares, Eutropius' Breviary of Roman History and St. Jerome's Chronicon there are accounts of Alexander's glorious victory over his enemies.

Severus Alexander: sestertius
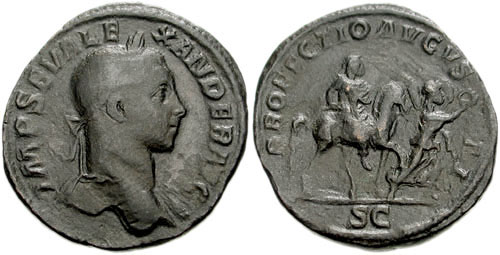
First side of the image: IMP SEV ALEXANDER AVG, laureate head right, drapery on shoulders;
Second side of the image: Profectio AVGVSTI, Alexander Severus on horseback, holding a spear, preceded by Victoria toward the right, holding a crown and a palm.
minted in 231/232.

=== 231 ===
Emperor Alexander Severus then organized a new military expedition against the Sasanids, enlisting a new legion in Italy, Legio IIII Italica. Herodian reports the speech Alexander made in front of the deployed troops and tells how the soldiers were encouraged by the emperor's words:

I'd like, oh comrades, to give you a customary speech, the speech from which I, speaking to the people, may receive approval, and you, when you hear it, receive encouragement. Since you have enjoyed a period of peace for many years, you may be surprised to hear something unusual or contrary to your imaginations. Brave and intelligent men should pray for things to go well, but they also have to endure whatever happens. It is true that enjoyment of things done for pleasure brings gratification, but good results come mainly from arranging things properly when necessity demands it. Initiating unjust actions is not evidence of good intentions, but it is a courageous act to free ourselves from those who generate dangers when this is done with a good conscience; good results can be expected if one does nothing unjust, but attempts to avoid injustice.
The Persian Artaxerxes killed his king, Artabanus IV, and the Parthian Empire turned Persian. He, despising our work and Roman reputation, is trying to assault and destroy our imperial possessions. I have tried to persuade him, by letter, to control his greed and his mad desire to occupy other people's property. But the king, with the arrogance characteristic of barbarians, does not want to stay within his borders and challenges us to battle. We do not hesitate, therefore, to accept his challenge.
You veterans will remember the victories against the barbarians under the leadership of Septimius Severus and my father, Caracalla. You recruits, yearning for glory and honor, make it clear that you know how to live in peace with propriety, but make it equally clear that courage is needed for war when necessity demands it. The barbarian is bold against those who hesitate or are cowardly, but he does not hold his own against those who fight; it is not in close combat that they can prevail against us. On the contrary, they believe that any success that leads to victory is the result of looting, after a feigned retreat or escape. Discipline, organization and battle tactics are in our favor, together with the fact that we have always beaten the barbarian.

— Herodian, History of the Empire after Marcus Aurelius, VI, 3.3-7.

After distributing money to the troops, he went to the Senate to make a similar speech and make his intentions public. On the day of his departure for the eastern front (perhaps in the spring of the same year), after attending the ritual sacrifices, Alexander left Rome (231), to reach Antioch, his headquarters.

After crossing Illyricum, where he gathered more troops, he reached Antioch toward the end of the year (231), where he had troops trained in the environmental conditions of the eastern provinces. He then made a final attempt at mediation, offering peace and friendship to Ardashir, which, however, he refused. The latter, in fact, not only sent back the Roman ambassadors empty-handed, but in turn sent a delegation of four hundred mounted archers, looking imposing and richly dressed in gold harness, to intimidate the Romans and invite Alexander to abandon all territories as far as the Bosporus. This provocation irritated Alexander to the point that he had them arrested, later sending them to cultivate lands in Phrygia, but without putting them to death.

=== 232 ===
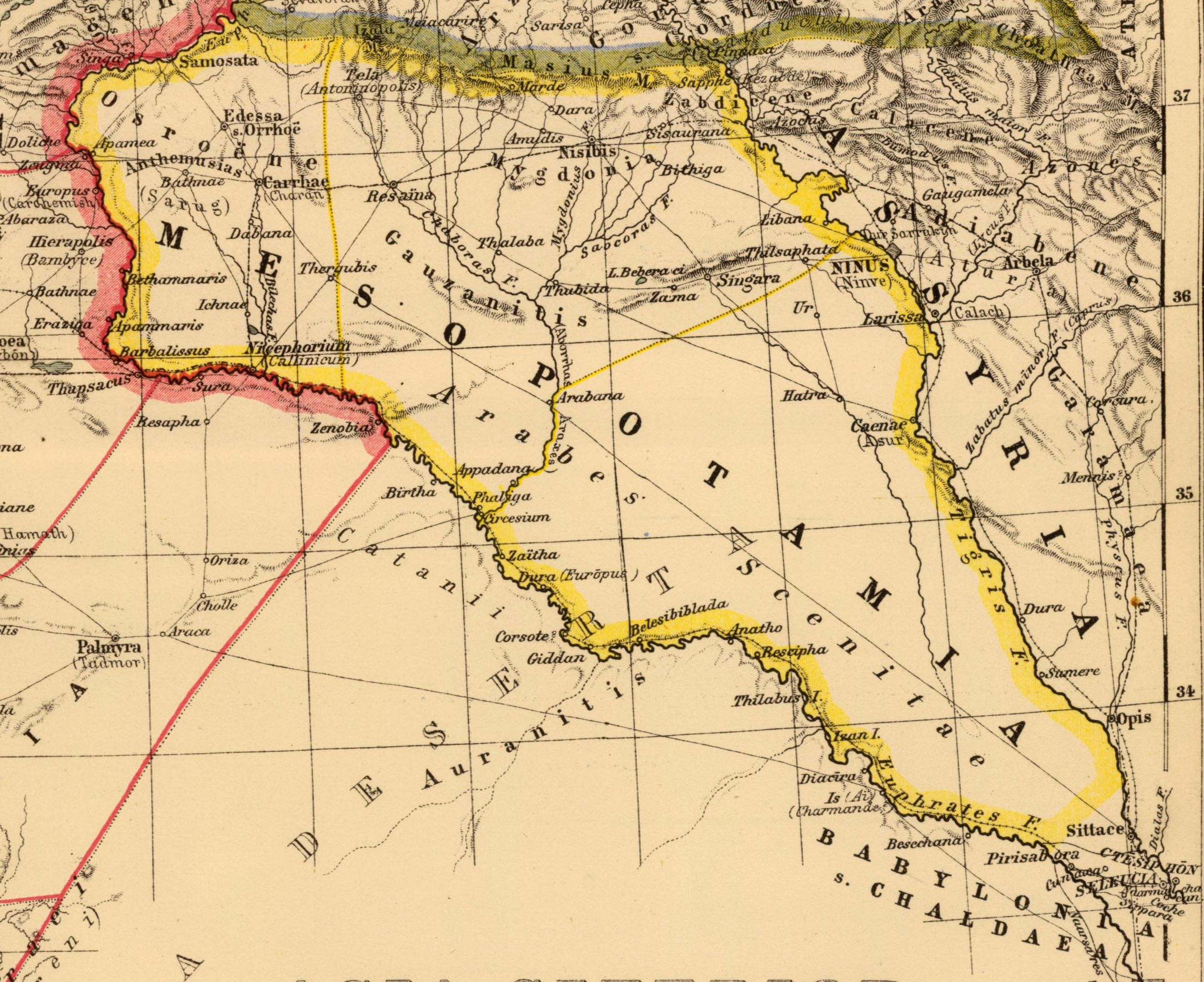
The theater of the campaigns of Alexander Severus

As Alexander Severus was preparing to cross the Tigris and Euphrates rivers and lead his army into Sasanian territory, several mutinies occurred among his troops, especially among soldiers from Egypt and those from Syria, where there was an attempt to proclaim a new emperor (a certain Taurinius) and the subsequent disbandment of an entire legion (the II Traiana Fortis), which was reformed shortly afterwards. These defections were quickly discovered and suppressed, although this led the Roman emperor to keep with him only those troops particularly loyal to him.

On the advice of his generals, Alexander divided the army into three parts, keeping for himself the strongest one destined for the center of the attacking front (which was probably to pass through Singara, as reads an inscription of the same year) and which is supposed to have been an advanced "headquarters" of the expedition, while the other two were to march on its sides: one farther north, through the "client" kingdom of Armenia, to Media; another farther south, which, passing through Palmyra, would lead to Dura Europos, then Circesium on the Euphrates, to where this river almost "touches" the course of the nearby Tigris, near the two Persian capitals of Ctesiphon and Seleucia. The idea was to attack the Sasanids from various directions, hoping to find the enemy unprepared for this particular strategy, and believing that forcing the Sasanian army to split up would result in a better tactical outcome in battle for the Roman armies:

- the northern army crossed Armenia with difficulty because of the steep and high mountain ranges that separated it from Media, where the Roman army seems to have been able to achieve some success, ravaging the countryside, burning villages and taking much booty with it, before the Persian king, Ardashir I, was able to rush with his army to the aid of the Medes, thus failing to stop the Roman advance;
- the southern army, which Herodian calls the "easternmost" (the one that ran along the Euphrates), was held in check by the Sasanian king. Ardashir, believing that this strategy could bring victory to the Romans, decided to leave behind an army strong enough to defend Media, while he decided to take on the one pushing more rapidly eastward (in the direction of Ctesiphon and Seleucia). This army was advancing too recklessly, since it believed, having encountered no opposition, that Alexander and his army (the largest and most complete of the three), had already attacked the Sasanians in the central sector. This led him to believe that their advance would be easier and less dangerous, considering that the Sasanids were engaged mainly on the central front, by their own emperor. This mistake was fatal to him;
- Alexander's central army, because of his princeps' indecision in advancing with determination, unwittingly left the southernmost contingent the most exposed to fight against Ardashir's much larger Sasanian army. The Roman defeat of the southernmost army was inevitable, and it seems to have resulted in great losses for the Romans, if not an almost total annihilation of it.

Herodian relates that the cause of Alexander's indecision was his fear of putting his own life on the line or the "feminine fears" of his mother Julia Mamaea, who had followed him to the East. News of the defeat reached the emperor as he had fallen ill, causing him to despair. The soldiers themselves, undermined by illnesses caused by the unhealthy environment and the scarcity of supplies, accused the emperor of having caused the destruction of the army by his inability to implement the established plans. Alexander then ordered the two surviving groups of troops to return to winter in Antioch, ready to reschedule a new campaign for the following year. Of the two returning armies, Alexander's army lost many soldiers en route to disease due to the torrid climate; the army from the north was virtually decimated by the frigid temperatures in the mountains of Armenia. Herodian believes that of the initial army, perhaps less than half returned because of these events, and he blamed the emperor's inexperience.

=== 232-233 (Winter) ===
Returning to Antioch, Alexander together with his two armies was able to recover quickly with them, thanks to the fresh air and good water of the city, after he had suffered from the drought in Mesopotamia. The emperor tried to console his soldiers for their suffering with a new distribution of money, in the belief that this was the only way he could regain their discipline and their desire for revenge. Herodian reports that Ardashir, who had disbanded his army and sent every soldier back to his country (as was customary among the Sasanids), though having beaten the Roman army because of his troops' better resistance to the torrid climate of those regions, was not satisfied. The Sasanian armies were also exhausted by the numerous skirmishes in Media and the battle in Parthia, where they had suffered heavy casualties of killed and wounded. The Romans had not, therefore, been resoundingly defeated; on the contrary, they had caused much damage to the enemy and had lost in the direct confrontation only because they were clearly outnumbered, while the Historia Augusta even speaks of a Roman victory and a well-deserved triumph for Alexander. Finally, Herodian summarizes Alexander and Ardashir's military campaign as follows:

Since the total number of troops that fell on both fronts was virtually identical, the surviving Sasanids seemed to have won, but because of superior numbers, not superior power. The proof was that the Sasanids remained quiet over the next three to four years and did not take up arms again. Having learned this, the Roman emperor, while in Antioch, was relieved of his anxiety about the war, becoming more cheerful and less apprehensive, now devoting himself to enjoying the pleasures the city offered him.

— Herodian, History of the Empire after Marcus Aurelius, VI, 6.6.

It should be added that, while Alexander was assembling a new army and preparing to march against the Persians for the spring of 233 (considering that he was unlikely to be able to raise such a large army in the following years, should he decide to forgo a new military campaign against the Sasanians), the sudden news of new invasions by the northern barbarians (Alemanni) along the Rhine and Danubian fronts forced him to permanently suspend preparations for a new campaign against Ardashir.

== Consequences ==
The clashes between the Romans and Sasanids, however, had also greatly weakened Ardashir's army, and he ordered its disbandment for the winter break between 232 and 233. The news reached Alexander, whose health had improved in Antioch, after he had attempted to regain the favor of his men with a donation and while he was preparing the continuation of the campaign. Although he was convinced that the danger was over, Alexander decided to end hostilities in the East partly because of the arrival of news that the Alemanni had broken through the limes of Rhine and Danube and were preparing to plunder fields and cities in full force. The death of the young emperor at the hands of one of his generals, Maximinus Thrax (in 235), and the subsequent military anarchy in which the Roman Empire poured for about fifty years, resulted in a few advantages in favor of the fledgling Sasanian Empire, which did not miss the opportunity for surprising revenge, even going so far as to occupy Antioch itself in 252 and 260.

== See also ==
- Roman–Persian Wars
- Severus Alexander
- Sasanian Empire

== Bibliography ==
- Agathangelos. History of the Armenians, I.
- Agathias. History of Justinian, IV.
- Aurelius Victor. De Caesaribus', XXIV.
- Cassius Dio. Roman History, LXXX.
- Corpus Inscriptionum Semiticarum, II.
- Herodian. History of the Empire after Marcus. Archived from the original on 2014-11-05.
- Eutropius. Breviarium ab Urbe condita.
- Syncellus, George. Selection of Chronography.
- Jerome. Chronicon.
- "Severus Alexander". Historia Augusta. Archived from the original on 2014-11-05.
- Orosius. Historiarum adversos paganos, VII.
- Festus. Breviarium rerum gestarum populi Romani.
- Zonaras, Joannes. Extracts of History.
- M. Carriè, J. (2008). "Eserciti e strategie, La Roma tardo-antica, per una preistoria dell'idea di Europa". Storia Einaudi dei Greci e dei Romani. Vol. 18. Milan: Einaudi.
- Cassola, F. (1968). Erodiano, Storia dell'Impero romano dopo Marco Aurelio. Florence.
- J. W. Drijvers, H. (1977). "Hatra, Palmyra and Edessa". Aufstieg Niedergang Römischen Welt. II.8.
- Hopkins, R. V. N. (1907). "The Life of Alexander Severus". Cambridge Historical Essays. XIV.
- Loriot, X. (1975). "Les premières années de la grande crise du III siecle: de l'avènement de Maximin Thrace (235) à la mort de Gordian III (244)". Aufstieg Niedergang Römischen Welt. II.2.
- Maricq, A. (1957). "Les dernières années d'Hatra: l'alliance romaine". Syria. 34.
- Millar, F. (1993). The Roman near East (31 BC - AD 337). Cambridge Massachusetts & London.
- Southern, Pat (2001). The Roman Empire: from Severus to Constantine. London & New York. ISBN 0-415-23944-3.
- Roman Imperial Coinage. Alexander Severus. IVb.
- Vattioni, F. (1981). Le iscrizioni di Hatra.
- Gonzales, J. R. (2003). Historia de las legiones romanas. Madrid.
- Le Bohec, Y. (2008). L'esercito romano. Rome.
