= Kingdom of Hatra =

1st-century Arab kingdom

- 1st century CE–241
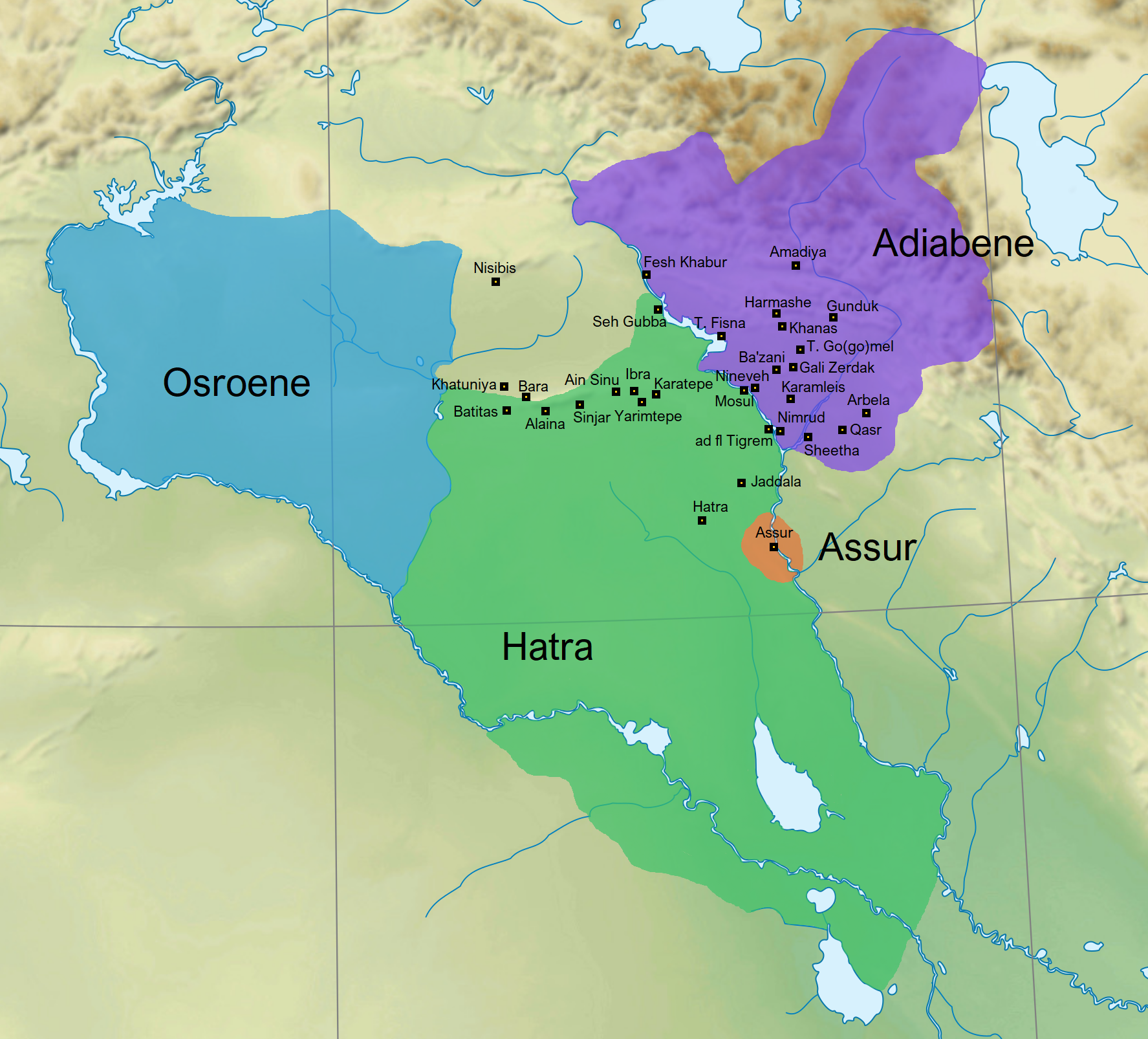
- Approximate map of the kingdom of Hatra (green) and other Parthian Mesopotamian vassal kingdoms in 200 CE
- Status: Autonomous state, frequently a vassal of the Parthian Empire
- Capital: Hatra
- Common languages: Hatran Aramaic; Old Arabic
- Religion: Hybrid of: Ancient Mesopotamian religion; Ancient Greek religion; Arabian polytheism
- Government: Monarchy
- King
- History
  - Established: 1st century CE
  - Fall of Hatra: 241
Preceded by	Succeeded by
Seleucid Empire	Sasanian Empire
- Today part of: Iraq

The Kingdom of Hatra (Arabic: مملكة الحضر, romanized: Mamlakat al-Ḥaḍr), also called Kingdom of Arabaya and Araba, was a 1st-century Arab kingdom, centered on the city of Hatra and located between the Roman and the Parthian empires, mostly under Parthian suzerainty, in modern-day northern Iraq.

== Name ==
The name of "Hatra" appears various times in the Aramaic Hatrene inscriptions as Hatran Aramaic: 𐣧𐣨𐣣𐣠, romanized: ḥṭrʾ, vocalized as: Ḥaṭrā), probably meaning "enclosure, hedge, fence".

== History ==
The history of Hatra before the Parthian Empire is obscure. It has been suggested that a settlement was founded there under the Neo-Assyrian or the Achaemenid Empire, but that remains speculative.

The earliest known records that mention Hatra are from the late 1st century CE. The early rulers of Hatra used the title of marya "lord", but starting from the 170s, they started using the title of malka "king", often in the form of "King of the Arabs". This elevation of titulature is considered to be related to the Roman incorporation of Edessa in 165, which resulted in Hatra being the westernmost part of the Parthian Empire, and thus of higher strategic importance. Several scholars, including the historian J. Teixidor, have argued that "Arab" in the texts of Hatra indicate the territory in which the town of Hatra is located, rather than a group of people.

In the first and second centuries, Hatra was ruled by a dynasty of princes with uncertain origins. According to the historians Patricia Crone and Michael Cook, the kings of Hatra were either Assyrians, Arabs with an Assyrian title, or just southern Arabs. The capital of the kingdom rose to prominence and became an important religious and trade center, having been known as a caravan city during the Seleucid period.

Hatra withstood repeated sieges - in the 2nd century by Roman emperors Trajan and Septimius Severus, and in the 220s by the Sasanian king Ardashir I. The kingdom was finally conquered after the 240/41 capture of its capital by the Sasanians under Shapur I, who destroyed the city.

== Culture ==
Hatra was part of the Parthian commonwealth, a term used by historians to refer to cultures that were under Parthian control, but mainly populated by non-Iranians. Although the Hatran language and its cults were very similar to that of the rest of Aramaic-speaking world in Mesopotamia and Syria, the Parthian Empire had heavily influenced the culture and political system of Hatra, as attested by epigraphic and archaeological findings.

Many Parthian titles are known to have been used, many which were also used in slightly different variants in Armenia as well as some in Parthia. This includes titles such as naxwadār (also attested in Armenian as naxarar), which was seemingly used as a personal name in Hatra. Other titles include pasāgrīw (heir-apparent), bitaxs (possibly viceroy), asppat (head of cavalry), ašpazkan (chamberlain), hadarpat (possibly chiliarch), naxširpat (chief of the hunt), and dahicpat, a word used as an epithet of the god Nergol. Not all the titles are solely Parthian, as some of the seem to have been derived from Old Persian. Regardless, these titles are attested in all the western parts of the Parthian Empire, which indicates that the Hatran court was shaped to imitate that of the Parthian royal court.

Like the rest of the Parthian commonwealth, Iranian personal names are also well attested in Hatra. The ruling family adopted the same names used by the Arsacid kings, such as Worod, Walagash and Sanatruq. The local populace also dressed in Parthian clothing, used Parthian jewellery and bore Parthian weapons.

Various gods were honored in the kingdom, including those of Sumero-Akkadian, Greek, Aramean, and Arabian religions.

== List of rulers ==
Name		Title	Date	Portrait	Note
1	Worod	mry´			
2	Ma’nu	mry´			
3	Elkud	mry´	155/156		
4	Nashrihab	mry´	128/29 - 137/38 CE		
5	Naṣru	mry´	128/29 - 176/77		
6	Wolgash I	mry´ and mlk			
7	Sanatruq I	mry´ and mlk	176/177		Ruled together with Wolgash I
8	Wolgash II				
9	Abdsamiya	mlk	192/93 - 201/202		Supported the Roman emperor Pescennius Niger
10	Sanatruq II	mlk	207/08 - 229/230		Became a vassal of the Romans under Gordian III during Roman-Persian Wars

== Gallery ==
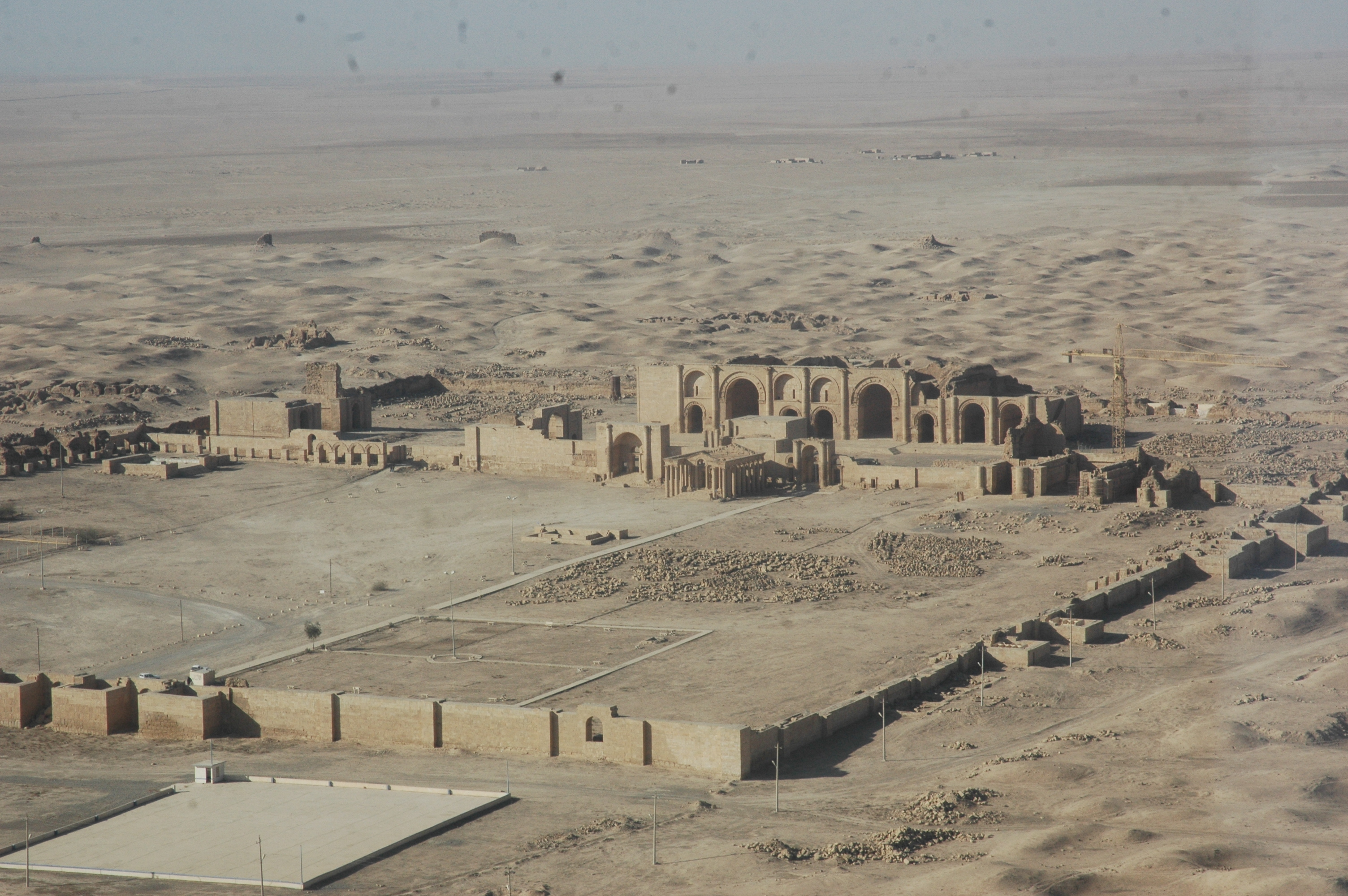
Aerial view of the ruins

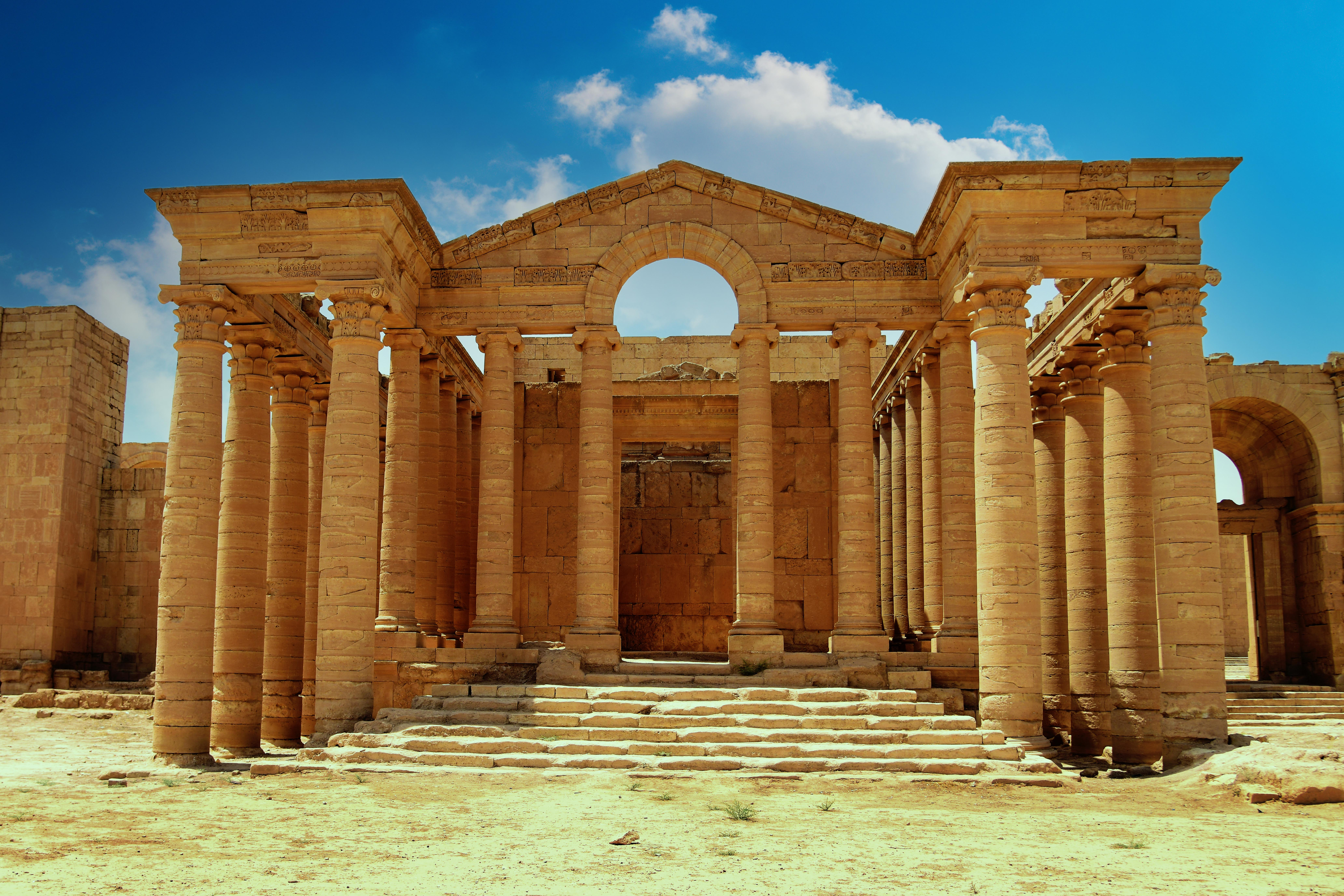
Temple of Maran

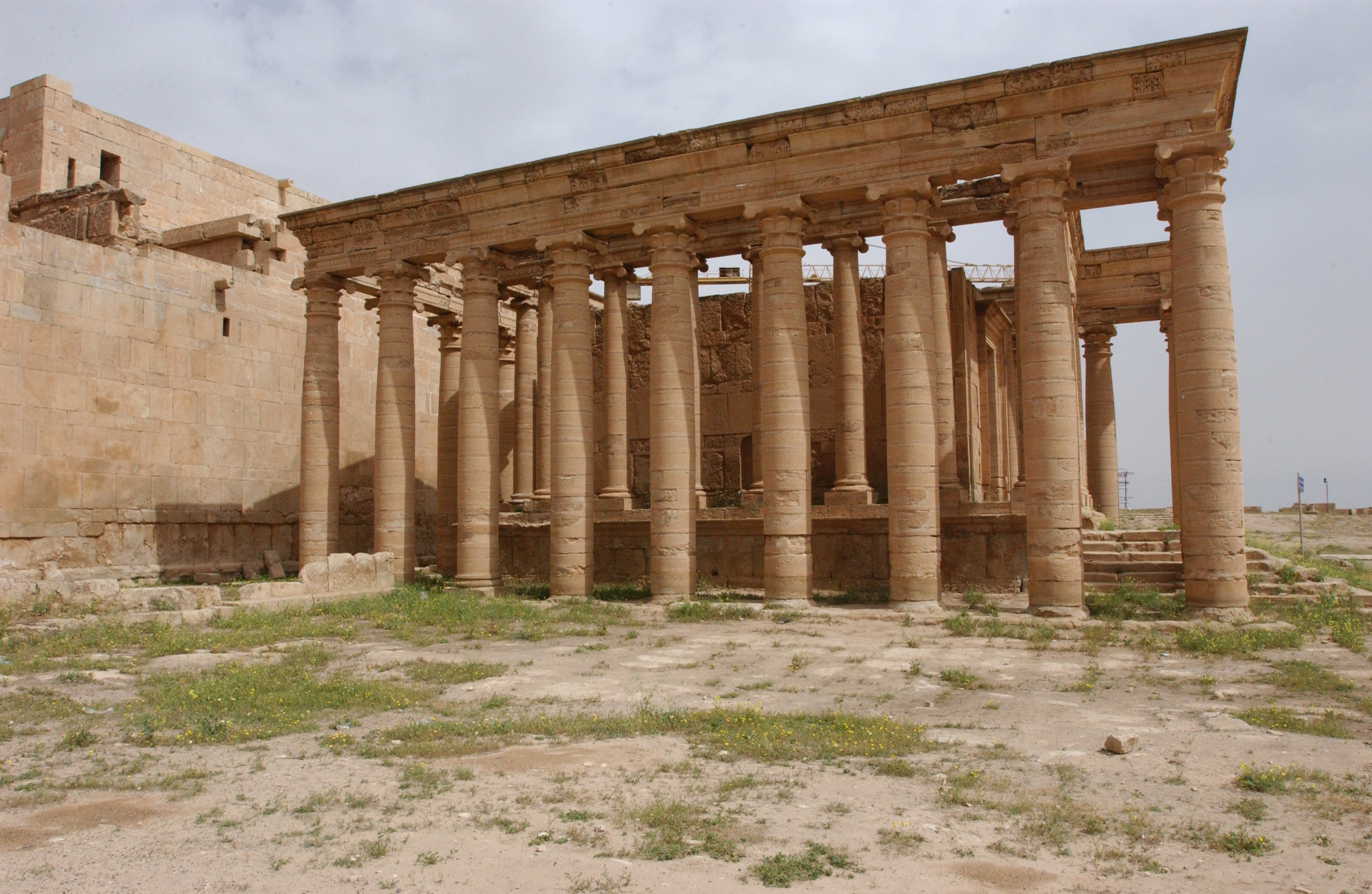

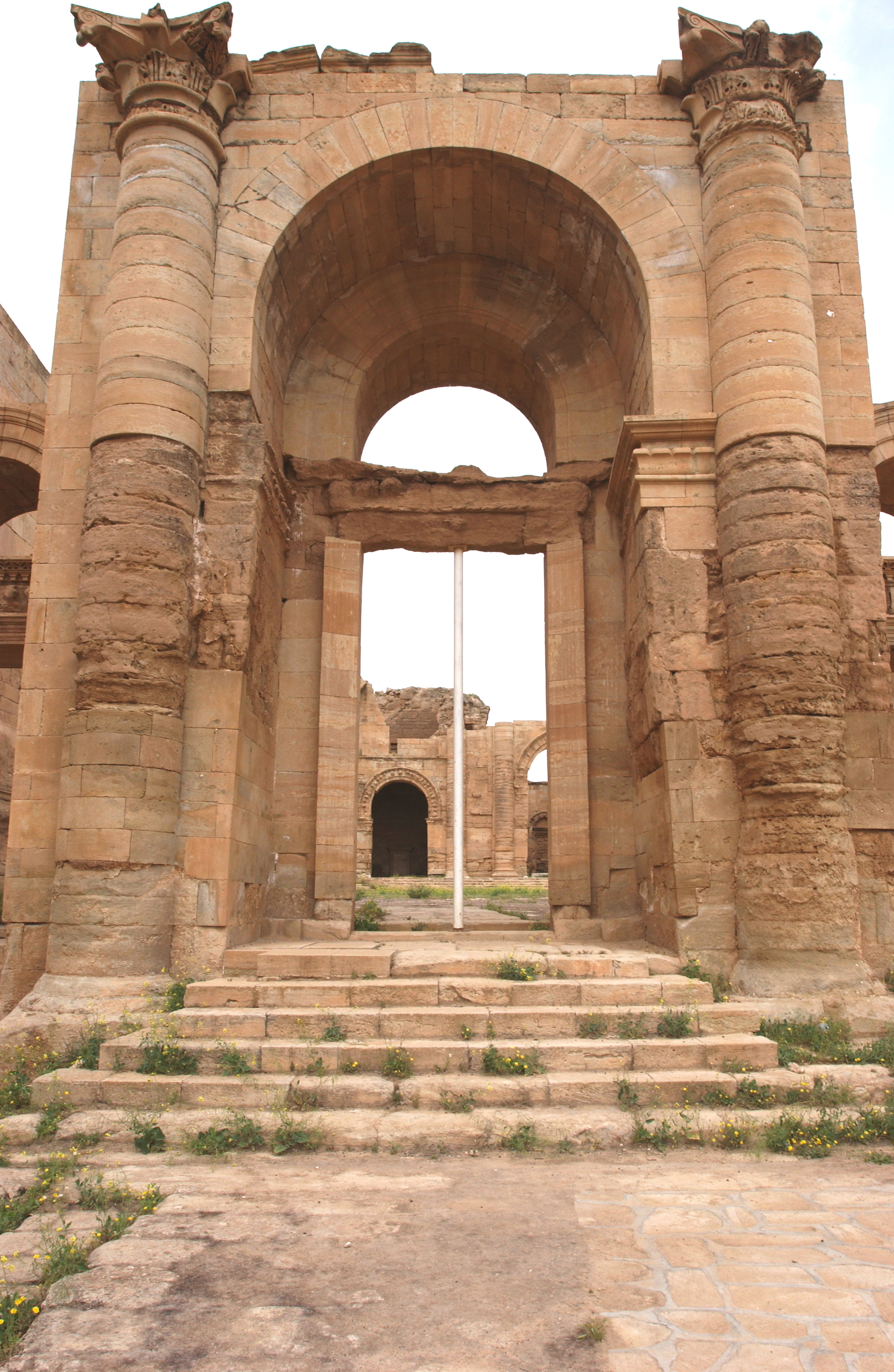

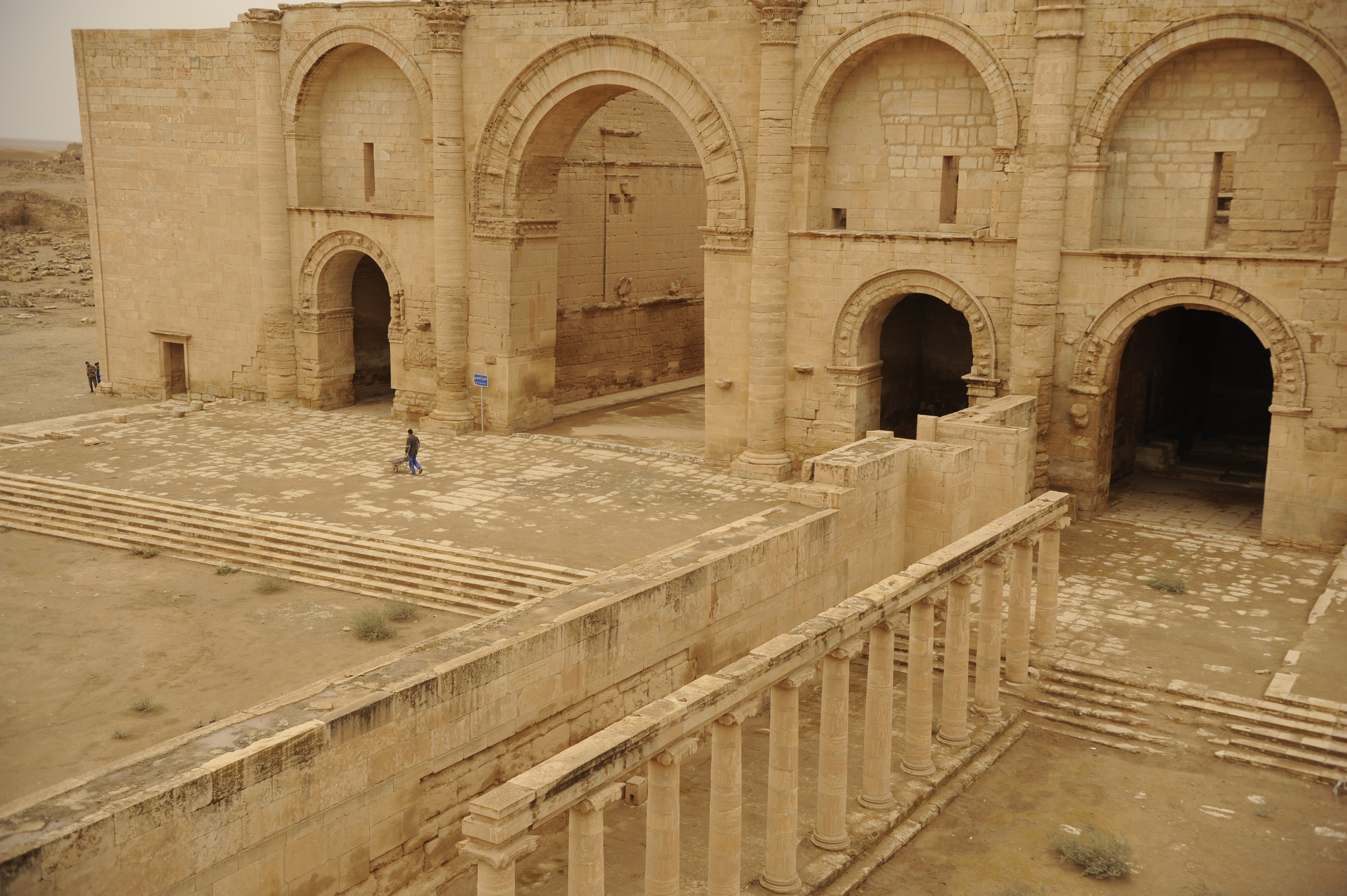

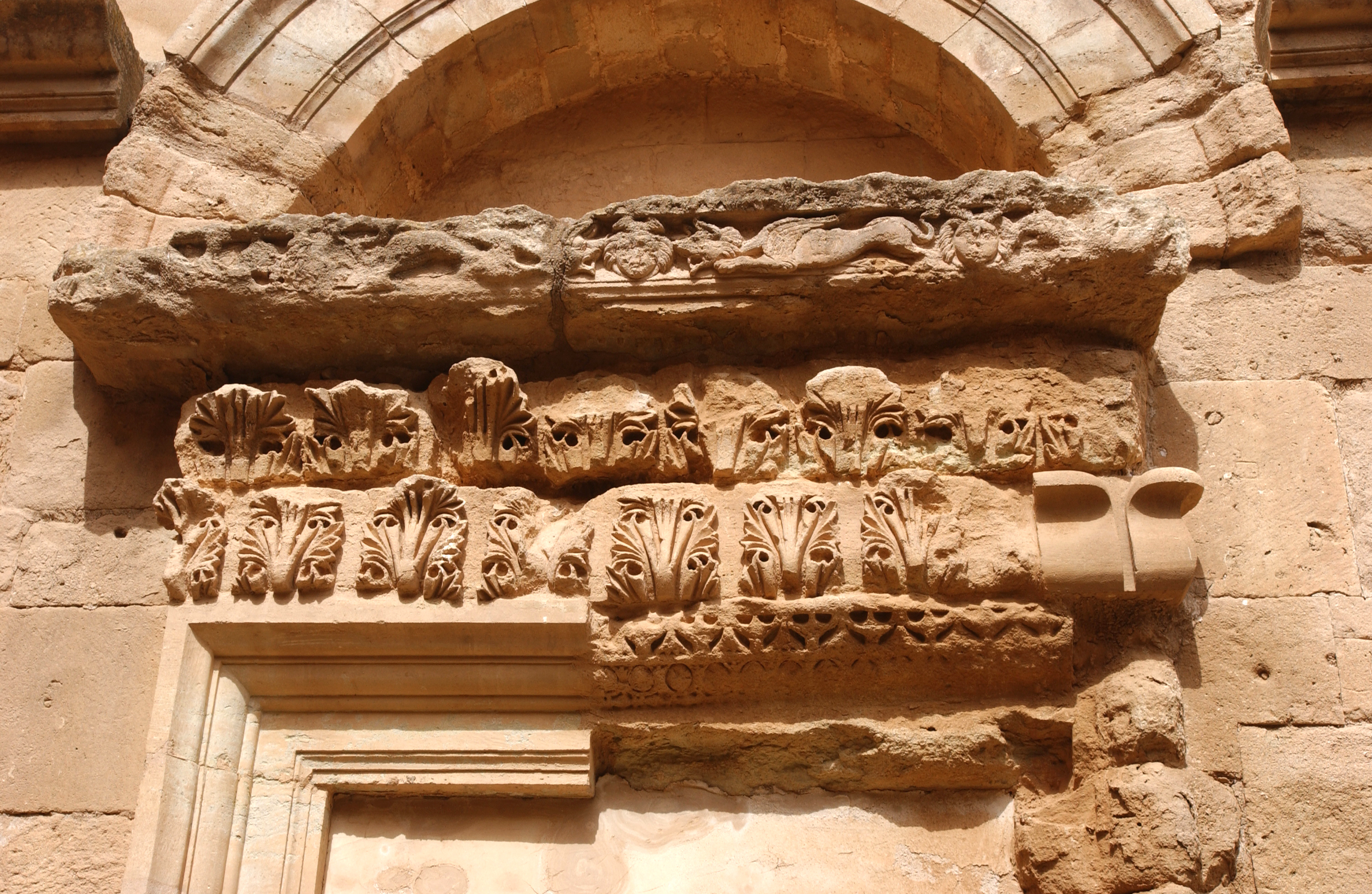

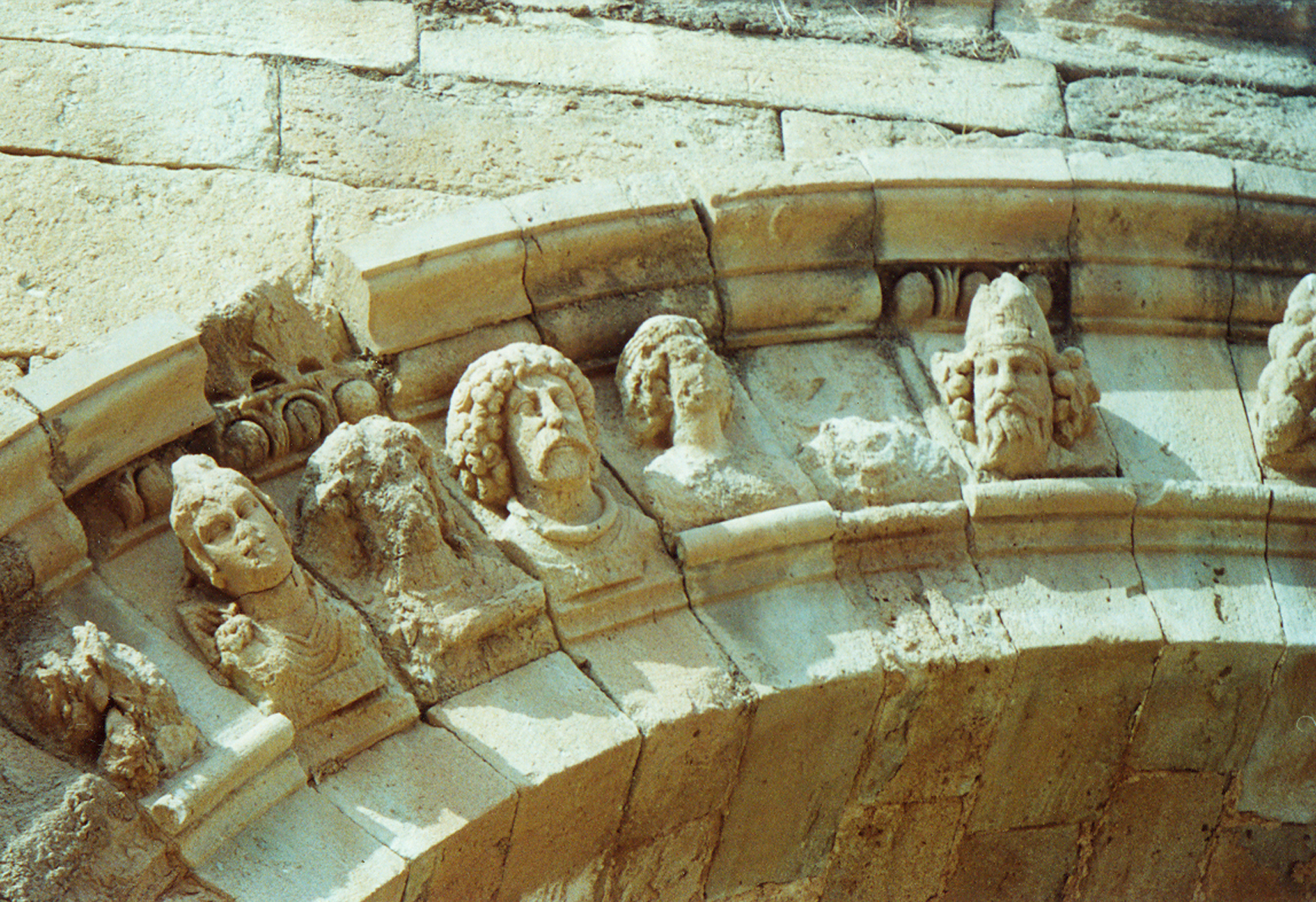

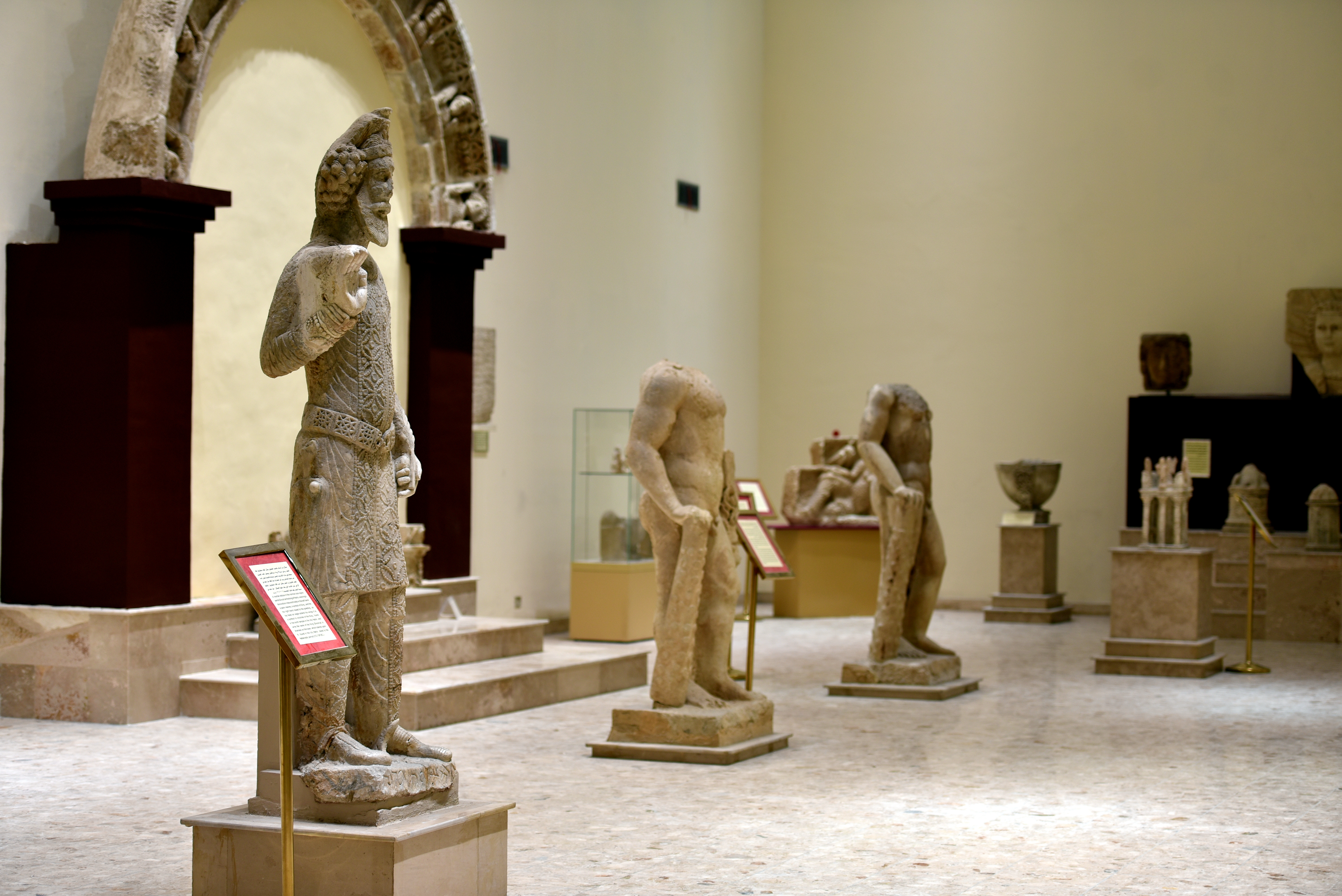
Hatra statues located in the Iraq Museum in Baghdad

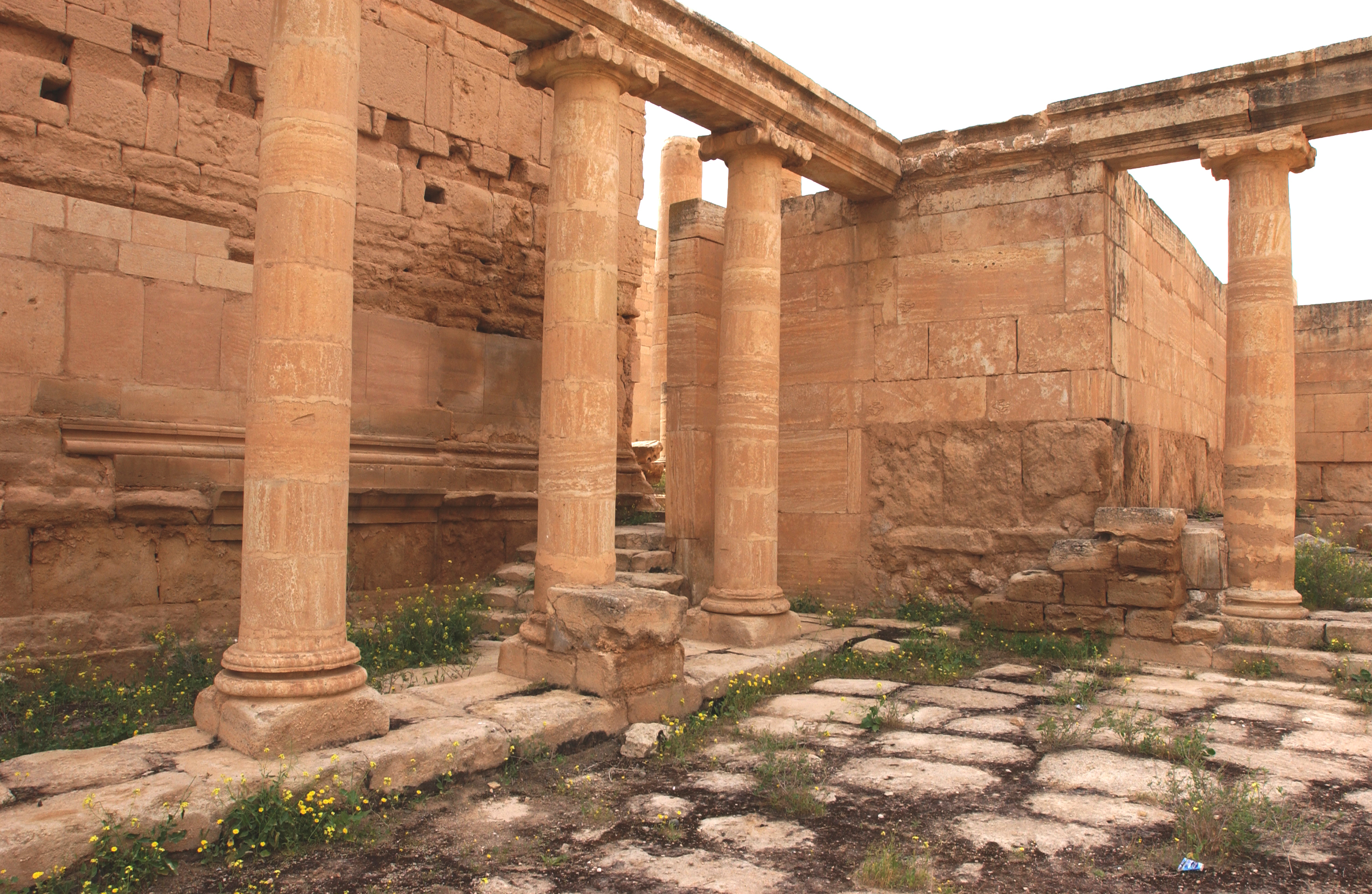

== See also ==
- Arbayistan (Arbaya), the Sasanian province

== Sources ==
- Canepa, Matthew (2018). The Iranian Expanse: Transforming Royal Identity Through Architecture, Landscape, and the Built Environment, 550 BCE–642 CE. Oakland: University of California Press. ISBN 9780520379206.
- de Jong, Albert (2013). "Hatra and the Parthian Commonwealth". Oriens et Occidens – Band 21: 143–161.
- Dijkstra, Klaas (1995). Life and loyalty: a study in the socio-religious culture of Syria and Mesopotamia in the Graeco-Roman period based on epigraphical evidence. Religions in the Graeco-Roman world. Vol. 128. Brill. ISBN 90-04-09996-4.
- Ellerbrock, Uwe (2021). The Parthians: The Forgotten Empire. Oxford: Routledge. ISBN 978-0367481902.
- Gregoratti, Leonardo (2017). "The Arsacid Empire". In Daryaee, Touraj (ed.). King of the Seven Climes: A History of the Ancient Iranian World (3000 BCE - 651 CE). UCI Jordan Center for Persian Studies. pp. 1–236. ISBN 9780692864401.
- Kaizer, Ted; Hekster, Olivier (2011). Frontiers in the Roman World: Proceedings of the Ninth Workshop of the International Network Impact of Empire. Brill. pp. 1–392. ISBN 9789004215030.
- Marcato, Enrico (2018). Personal Names in the Aramaic Inscriptions of Hatra. Digital Publishing. ISBN 9788869692314.
- Marciak, Michał (2017). Sophene, Gordyene, and Adiabene: Three Regna Minora of Northern Mesopotamia Between East and West. BRILL. ISBN 9789004350724.
- Michael Sommer: Hatra. Geschichte und Kultur einer Karawanenstadt im römisch-parthischen Mesopotamien. von Zabern, Mainz 2003, ISBN 3-8053-3252-1, p. 23.
- Sartre, Maurice (2005). The Middle East Under Rome. Harvard University Press. ISBN 9780674016835.
- Schmitt, Rüdiger (2003). "Hatra". Encyclopaedia Iranica, Vol. XII, Fasc. 1. pp. 58–61.
