= Sanatruces =

Sanatruces, Sinatruces (Σανατρούκης - Grecized), Sanatruk (Old Armenian: Սանատրուկ), or Sanatruq (Aramaicized), may refer to:

- Sanatruces of Parthia
- Sanatruces II of Parthia
- Sanatruk, Arsacid king of Armenia
- Sanatruq I, king of Hatra
- Sanatruq II, king of Hatra
- Sanesan or Sanatruk, king of Maskut
