= Ardashir I's siege of Hatra =

First siege of Hatra
- Part of the Mesopotamian campaigns of Ardashir I
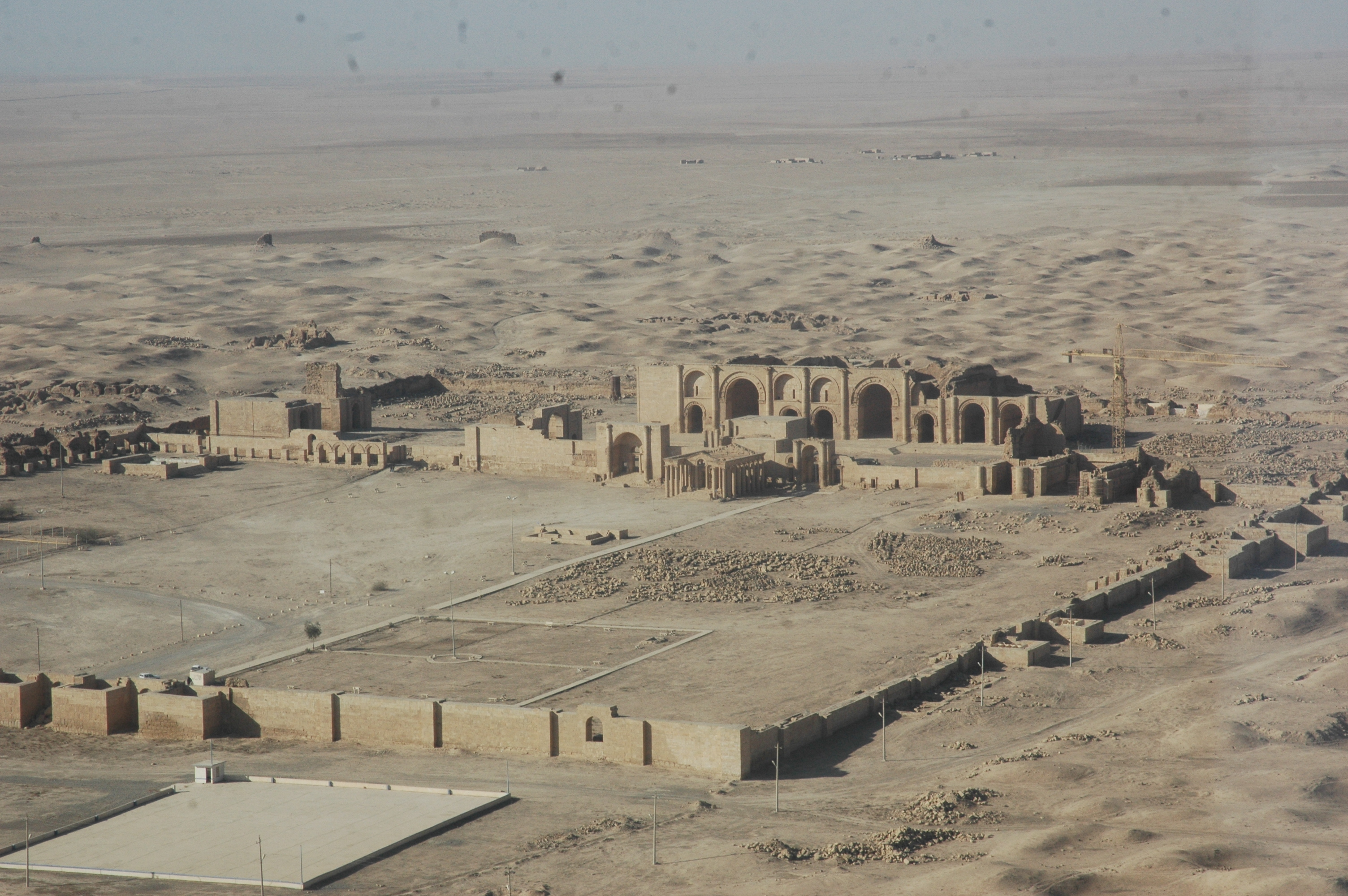
- The ruins of the ancient city of Hatra, the City of the Sun god, are located c. 300 kilometers northwest of Baghdad, Iraq.
| Date | c. 229 or c. 226–227 |
| Location | Hatra, Mosul (modern-day Iraq) 35°35′17″N 42°43′6″E |
| Result | Hatrene-Roman victory |

Belligerents
| Sasanian Empire | Roman Empire; Kingdom of Hatra |

Commanders and leaders
| Ardashir I | Sanatruq II |
- Location within Iraq

The First siege of Hatra by Ardashir I was an attempt at gaining the fortress of Hatra, which is about 290 km (180 mi) north-west of Baghdad.

== The siege ==
In c.226/c.229, the first Sasanian ruler, Ardashir I, besieged the city of Hatra, which may have been a Roman client kingdom. (Note: There are three Latin dedications, the first of which is dated to the year 235 and the other two are by a senior officer, show that Hatra was on the Romans’ side in the first years of Sasanian rule and that Roman troops were stationed there.)

The city's strong defenses, whose fortifications, according to archaeological evidence, reached 30 meters, resulted in a failure of this siege. Ardashir then marched to Media, where he succeeded in subduing its territories, and then to Armenia, where he was repulsed by Artabanus IV probably in 227–228.

== Sources ==
- Edwell, Peter (2007). Between Rome and Persia: The Middle Euphrates, Mesopotamia and Palmyra Under Roman Control. Taylor & Francis.
- Dodgeon, Michael H.; Lieu, Samuel N. C. (1991). The Roman Eastern Frontier and the Persian Wars (AD 226—363). A Documentary History.
- Oates, D. (1955). "A Note on Three Latin Inscriptions from Hatra". Sumer. 11: 39–43.
- Schmitt, Rüdiger (2003). "HATRA". Encyclopaedia Iranica.
- Wiesenhöfer, Joseph (1986). "ARDAŠĪR I i. History". Encyclopaedia Iranica.
