= Siege of Hatra =

Siege of Hatra may refer to:

- Siege of Hatra (116–117) Part of Roman–Parthian Wars
- Siege of Hatra (197–198) Part of Roman–Parthian Wars
- Ardashir I's siege of Hatra Part of Roman–Sasanian wars
- Fall of Hatra Part of Roman–Sasanian wars
