= Mesopotamian campaign of Ardashir I =

Mesopotamian campaign of Ardashir I may refer to:

- First Mesopotamian campaign of Ardashir I Part of Roman–Persian Wars
- Second Mesopotamian campaign of Ardashir I Part of Roman–Persian Wars
