= First Mesopotamian campaign of Ardashir I =

Campaign of Ardashir I against the Roman Empire

- Part of Roman–Persian Wars
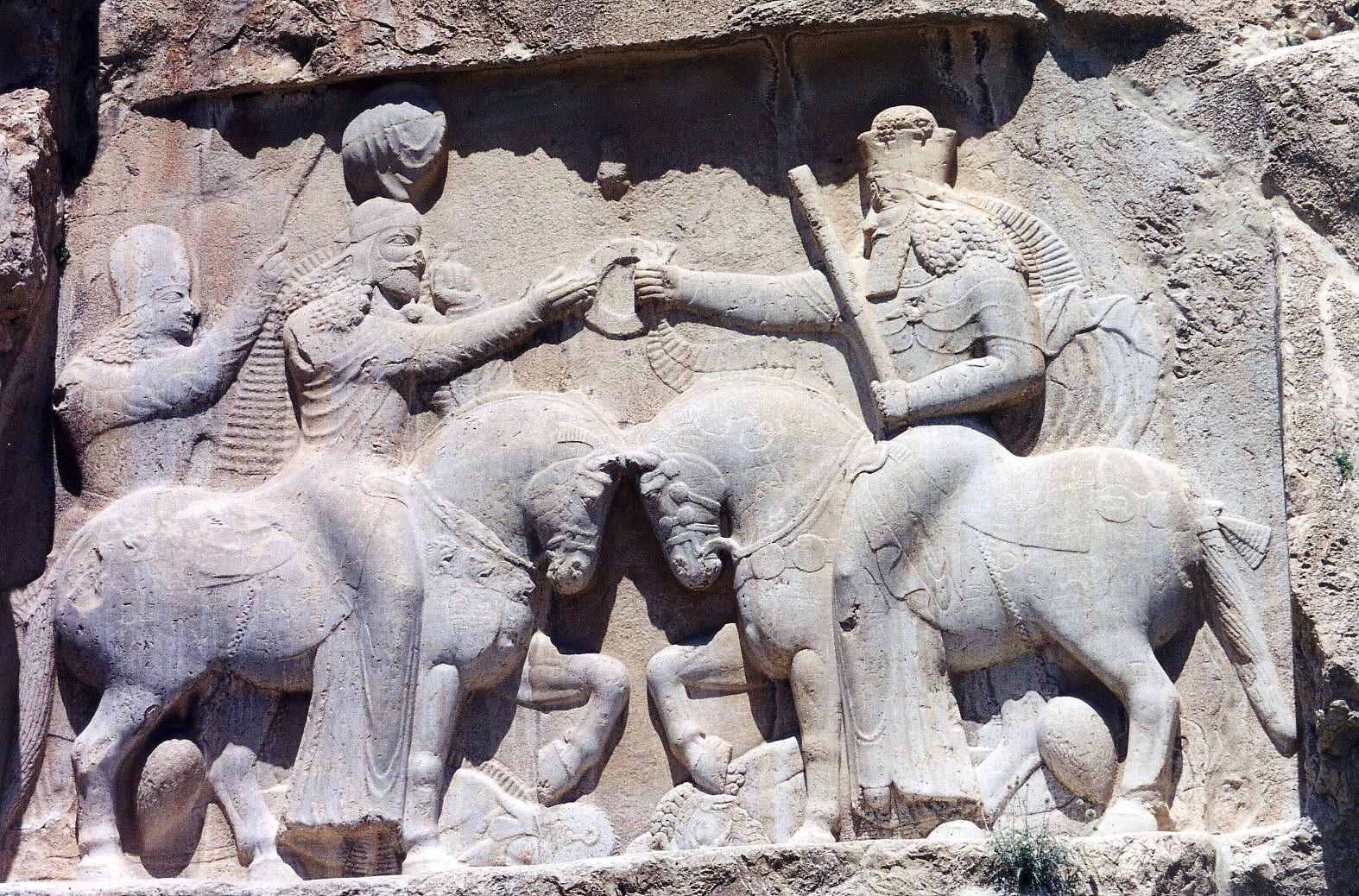
- Ardashir I is crowned ruler by the god Ahura Mazdā in a relief at Naqsh-e Rostam.
Date	229 – 233 AD
Location	Armenia and Mesopotamia
Result	Inconclusive

Belligerents
Sassanids	Roman Empire

Commanders and leaders
Ardashir I	Severus Alexander

Strength
100,000 soldiers along the eastern lines	

The First Mesopotamian campaign of Ardashir I represented the first episode in a new period of wars between the Romans and Sasanids. The war between the Roman Empire, ruled by the Roman emperor Severus Alexander (222–235), and the Sasanian Empire, led by Ardashir I (224–241), lasted from 229 to 233.

== Historical context ==
Between 224 and 226/227, an important episode changed the fate of relations between the Roman and Persian empires: in the East, the last Parthian ruler, Artabanus IV, was overthrown after being defeated in "three battles," and the insurgent, Ardashir I, founded the Sasanian dynasty, destined to be the eastern adversary of the Romans until the 7th century. Specifically, beginning in 229/230, Sasanians and Romans clashed for the first time.

Ardashir I was the first Persian king who had the courage to launch an attack against the Parthian kingdom and the first to succeed in regaining the empire for the Persians.

— Herodian, History of the Empire after Marcus Aurelius, VI, 2.6.

On the Roman front, the new Severan dynasty that reigned over the Roman Empire between the end of the second and the first decades of the third century (from 193 to 235, with a brief interruption during the reign of Macrinus between 217 and 218), and which had had in Septimius Severus its progenitor, was now in the hands of a young emperor, Severus Alexander, who a few years later was killed, revealing himself to be the last descendant. The new dynasty had arisen on the ashes of a long period of civil wars, where three other contenders besides Septimius Severus (Didius Julianus, Pescennius Niger, and Clodius Albinus) had faced each other.

=== Casus belli ===
The casus belli was the claim by the Sasanian Empire, who considered themselves descendants of the Persians, to possession of the entire Achaemenid Empire, including the territories, now Roman, of Asia Minor and the Near East as far as the Aegean Sea.

[Ardashir] Believing that the entire continent in front of Europe, separated by the Aegean Sea and the Sea of Marmara, and the region called Asia belonged to him by divine right, he intended to reclaim it for the Persian Empire. He declared that all the countries in the area, between Ionia and Caria, had been ruled by Persian satraps, starting from Cyrus the Great, who first transferred the kingdom from Media to the Persians, to Darius III, the last of the Persian rulers, whose kingdom was destroyed by Alexander the Great. So in his opinion it was right to restore and reunite for the Persians, the kingdom they had previously possessed.

— Herodian, History of the Empire after Marcus Aurelius, VI, 2.2.

== Forces in the field ==
=== Sasanian Empire ===
It is not known precisely how many and what armies were fielded by the Sasanian Empire. Cassius Dio recounts that it was certainly a large army, ready to terrorize not only the Roman province of Mesopotamia but also that of Syria, west of the Euphrates.

What is known of this army is that it was not permanent like the Roman army, with professional soldiers paid regularly for their trade. There was only an eventual division of the final spoils. Rather, the system was similar to the feudal one, where for each campaign it was necessary to assemble an army from time to time, composed of nobles at the head of their "clans," subjected then under the command of a prince of the royal house. Thus, there were no experienced weapons officers serving continuously, nor was there a lasting system of recruitment, as there were no permanent military units, although there were many nobles at the disposal of the Sasanian army. For these reasons, they often hired mercenary armies. They mainly used the bow and horse in warfare, unlike the Romans who favored infantry, so much so that the Sasanians are said to have grown up from childhood, riding and shooting with arrows, constantly living for war and hunting.

However, unlike the Arsacid Parthians, they tried to keep their contingents under arms for more years during major military campaigns, speeding up the recruitment of their armies, as well as better assimilating the siege techniques of their Roman opponents, which they never really learned from their predecessors.

=== Roman Empire ===
It is known that for the Romans, the forces put in charge were represented by the legions and auxiliary troops stationed along the eastern lines, which, according to Cassius Dio, were not enough prepared in terms of discipline and morale to cope with this new eastern danger. Below is a list of the legions and their respective fortresses (to which one might later add the IV Italica, formed around 231 by Severus Alexander):

No. of legionary fortresses of the eastern limes	Legionary unit	Ancient location	Modern location	Roman province
1	Legio XV Apollinaris	Satala	Sadagh	Cappadocia
2	Legio XII Fulminata	Melitene	Melitene	Cappadocia
3	Legio III Parthica	Nisibis	Nusaybin	Mesopotamia
4	Legio I Parthica	Singara	Sinjar	Mesopotamia and Osroene
5	Legio IV Scythica	Zeugma	Belkis	Syria Coele
6	Legio XVI Flavia Firma	Sura	Sura	Syria Coele
7	vexill. Legio II Parthica	Apamea		Syria Coele
8	Legio III Gallica	Danaba	Mehin	Syria Phoenicia
9	Legio X Fretensis	Aelia Capitolina	Jerusalem	Syria Palaestina
10	Legio VI Ferrata	Caparcotna	Kfar Otnay	Syria Palaestina
11	Legio III Cyrenaica	Bostra	Bosra	Arabia Petraea

== Stages of the conflict ==
=== First phase: Sasanian advance in Mesopotamia (229-231) ===
229 ca.

With the rise of the first Sasanian ruler, Ardashir I, the Persian armies returned to unsuccessfully besiege the city of Hatra (to make it a base of attack against the Romans.) It is not known whether it was under direct Roman control, or simply a "client" city of the Roman Empire. After the failure of this siege, the Sasanian ruler went first to Media, where he succeeded in subduing its territories, and then to Armenia, where he was, however, repulsed by a son of the old Parthian ruler, Artabanus IV.

230

In the course of this year, the Sasanian armies advanced into Roman Mesopotamia laying siege to many Roman garrisons along the Euphrates, also attempting, unsuccessfully, to conquer Nisibis (an important center of trade with the East and China), and perhaps invading the Roman provinces of Syria and Cappadocia, although there is insufficient archaeological evidence, at least in the present state of knowledge, to say that the raids also affected territories west of the Euphrates.

Unexpected dispatches from the governors of Syria and Mesopotamia revealed that Artaxerxes the Persian ruler, had conquered the Parthian kingdom and occupied all its eastern part, killing their king Artabanus IV, and was now called the "Great King" and wore the double diadem. Artaxerxes then subdued all his neighboring barbarians and forced them to pay tax. He did not remain inactive, staying on his side of the Tigris river: in fact, he decided to cross over the riverbanks and cross the borders of the Roman Empire, invading Mesopotamia and posing a threat to Syria.

— Herodian, History of the Empire after Marcus Aurelius, VI, 2.1.

In addition, some detachments of the Roman army (Legio I Parthica and Cohors IX Maurorum [Gordiana]) were left at Hatra.

231

Emperor Severus Alexander then organized a new military expedition against the Sasanians, enlisting a new legion in Italy, Legio IIII Italica. Herodian reports the speech Alexander made in front of the deployed troops and tells how the soldiers were encouraged by the emperor's words. After distributing money to the troops, he went to the Senate to make a similar speech and make his intentions public. On the day of his departure (perhaps in the spring of that year), after attending the ritual sacrifices, Alexander left Rome (231), to reach his headquarters in Antioch.

=== Second phase: Roman reaction (232-233) ===
Severus Alexander: tetradrachm
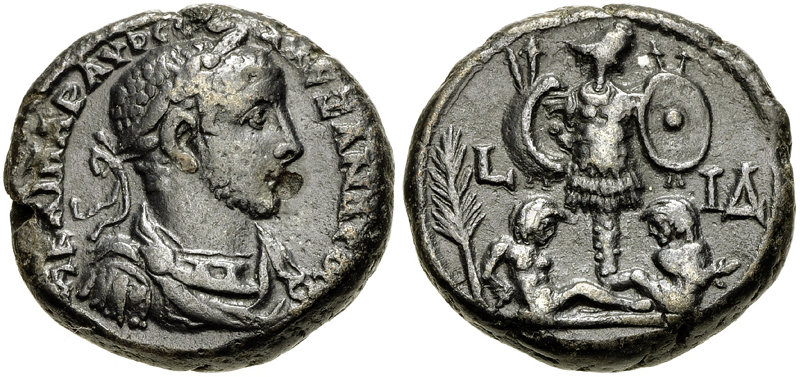
First side of the image: ... MAP AVP ALEXAND POC... , laureate head right, wearing breastplate;
Second side of the image: L IΔ, Trophy with two prisoners at the base on the right and left; a palm tree on the left.
Minted in 234.

Once Alexander reached Antioch, he made a further attempt at mediation, offering peace and friendship to Ardashir, but the latter not only sent back the Roman envoys empty-handed, but also sent four hundred of his soldiers of imposing appearance and richly clothed to the Roman emperor with a renewed invitation to leave the Roman lands as far as the Bosporus. Alexander arrested the four hundred Sasanian envoys and sent them to cultivate lands in Phrygia, but did not put them to death.

The Roman offensive began with a strategic plan to divide the Roman army into three different marching columns. Alexander chose the central one for himself, while the first was to advance northward and subdue Armenia and Media, and the third, was to descend the Euphrates River, joining with that of Alexander Severus near Ctesiphon. His indecision in advancing and the poor level of preparedness of the eastern Roman troops meant that the southern contingent was opposed by almost the entire Sasanian army, which defeated the Romans by inflicting heavy losses. Herodian relates that the cause of Alexander's indecision was his fear of putting his own life on the line or the "feminine fears" of his mother Julia Mamaea, who had followed him to the East. News of the defeat reached the emperor while he was ill, causing him to despair about the final outcome of the campaign. The soldiers themselves, undermined by illnesses caused by the unhealthy environment and the scarcity of provisions, accused the emperor of having caused the destruction of the army because of his lack of military ability, so much so that there was an attempt at usurpation, immediately foiled, by a certain Uranius. Alexander then ordered the two surviving groups of troops to winter in Antioch, and on the way back it seems that the Roman losses were considerable: the army from the north was practically decimated by the frigid temperatures in the mountains of Armenia, the southern one by the defeat suffered along the Euphrates at the hands of a numerically superior opponent.

However, the campaign proved not entirely bad for the Romans, as the territories lost in Mesopotamia in the course of the Sasanian advance of 229-230 were recaptured and the Sasanians did not renew their assaults until around 237, but this time, they were much more successful. Alexander took the victorious titles of Parthicus maximus and Persicus.

== Consequences ==
The death of the young emperor at the hands of one of his generals, Maximinus the Thracian (in 235), and the subsequent military anarchy into which the Roman Empire poured for about fifty years, determined considerable advantages in favor of the nascent Sasanian Empire, which did not miss the opportunity to go so far as to occupy Antioch itself in 252 and 260.

== See also ==
- Sasanian campaign of Severus Alexander
- Second Mesopotamian campaign of Ardashir I
- Ardashir I
- Severus Alexander

== Bibliography ==
Ancient sources

- Agathangelos, History of the Armenians, I.
- Agathias, History of Justinian's reign, IV.
- Année épigraphique.
- Cassius Dio, Roman History, LXXX. English version HERE.
- Codex Manichaicus Coloniensis.
- Herodian, History of the empire after Marcus Aurelius, VI. English version HERE Archived November 5, 2014, at the Wayback Machine.
- Eutropius, Breviarium ab Urbe condita, VIII. Latin version HERE.
- Giorgio Sincello, Selezione di cronografia.
- Historia Augusta, Alexander Severus and Gordiani tres. English version HERE and HERE
- Res Gestae Divi Saporis (translated from an inscription in Parthian and Greek, of the ruler Shapur I, found at Naqsh-i-Rustam).
- Supplementum Epigraphicum Graecum 7, Berlin 1934.
- Zonaras, Extracts of History, XII. Latin version HERE
- Zosimus, New History, I.

Modern historiographical sources

- J.-M.Carriè, Eserciti e strategie, La Roma tardo-antica, per una preistoria dell'idea di Europa, vol.18, in "Storia Einaudi dei Greci e dei Romani", Milan, Einaudi, 2008.
- H.J.W.Drijvers, Hatra, Palmyra and Edessa, in Aufstieg Niedergang Römischen Welt, II.8 (1977).
- X.Loriot, Les premières années de la grande crise du III siecle: de l'avènement de Maximin Thrace (235) à la mort de Gordian III (244), Aufstieg Niedergang Römischen Welt, II.2 (1975), pp. 657–787.
- A.Maricq, Les dernières années d'Hatra: l'alliance romaine, in Syria 34 (1957).
- F.Millar, The Roman near East (31 BC - AD 337), Cambridge Massachusetts & London 1993.
- Southern, Pat (2001). The Roman Empire: from Severus to Constantine. London & New York.
- F.Vattioni, Le iscrizioni di Hatra, 1981.
