= Al-Nadirah =

Medieval story about the fall of Hatra and its princess

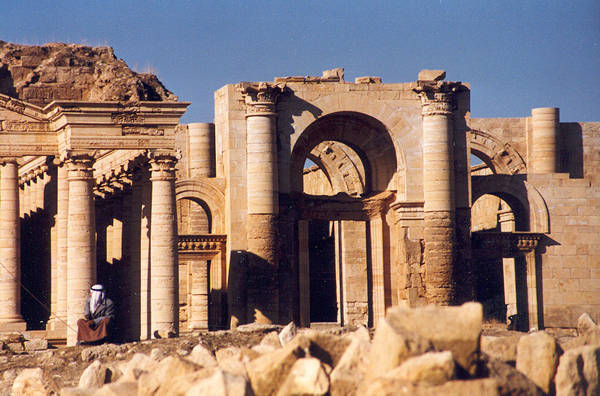
The fortified desert city of Hatra, which had repelled three Roman and one Persian sieges, fell to the Persian king Shapur I in 241.

According to a medieval story, al-Nadirah (Arabic: النضيرة, romanized: an-Naḍīrah; Persian: نضیره, romanized: Nazirah) was the Princess of Hatra who fell in love with the young Persian king Shapur I while he was besieging the city.

This narrative is recorded in Persian and Arabic sources of the early Islamic period, and some of its elements inspired some modern stories. Its general theme has common features with some Greek and Roman legends. Scholars have described the story of al-Nadirah as a rumor or a tale.

== Plot ==
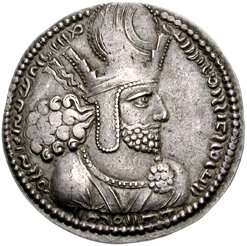
Silver coin of Shapur I

According to early Islamic myth, al-Nadirah was the daughter of al-Dayzan or Satirun (Sanatruq II), the king of Hatra. She betrayed the fortified capital, Hatra, to the Persian king Shapur I after seeing and falling in love with him while he was besieging the city. She did this by intoxicating her father and the guards of the city gates, or, according to another version of the story, by revealing to the enemy the talisman on which the city's ownership depended. Subsequently, Shapur I captured and destroyed Hatra and killed its king. He departed with al-Nadirah and married her at Ayn al-Tamr. At one night, al-Nadirah could not fall asleep, complaining that her bed was too rough for her. It then turned out that a myrtle leaf was stuck on her skin and was irritating her. Astonished by her softness, Shapur I asked her how her father had brought her up, and she described how well he had treated her. Shapur I realized al-Nadirah's ingratitude towards her father and had her executed in a brutal manner.

== Sources ==
The story is recorded in classical Arabic and Persian literature and the poetry of the early Islamic period, including al-Tabari's Tarikh al-Tabari, Mirkhond's Rawzat as-Safa', Ibn Khallikan's Wafayāt al-Aʿyān, and Ferdowsi's Shahnameh, where she is recorded as Mālikah (مالكه), daughter of king Tā'ir (طایر), while the Persian king is Shapur II, instead of Shapur I.

== Analysis ==
According to historian Robert G. Hoyland, the story of al-Nadirah was merely a rumor.

According to Theodor Nöldeke, al-Tabari's story is derived from the Greek tale of Scylla and her father Nisos. Some consider it as a Near Eastern version of the Tarpeia theme. The theme of Al-Nadirah's legend was used in Hans Christian Andersen's fairy tale "The Princess and the Pea" and Ahmed Shawqi's Waraqat al-As (The Myrtle Leaf).
