= Second Mesopotamian campaign of Ardashir I =

- Part of the Roman–Persian Wars
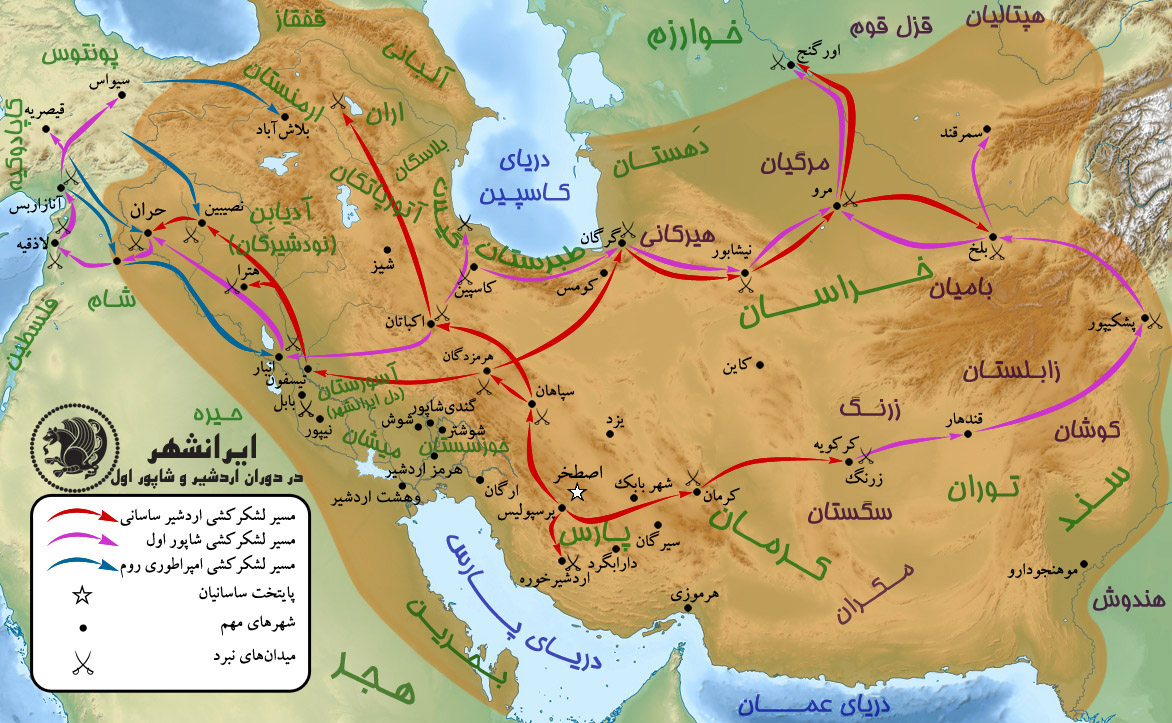
- Campaigns of Ardashir I and Shapur I
| Date | 237–241 |
| Location | Mesopotamia (Roman province) |
| Result | Sasanian victory |
| Territorial changes | The Sasanian Empire conquers several cities including Nisibis (237), Carrhae (238) and Hatra (240) |

Belligerents
| Roman Empire | Sasanian Empire |

Commanders and leaders
| Maximinus Thrax; Sanatruq II † | Ardashir I Shapur I |

The Second Mesopotamian campaign of Ardashir I was an episode of the Roman–Sasanian Wars (224-363), the war between the Roman Empire, ruled by the Roman emperor Maximinus Thrax, and the Sasanian Empire, led by Ardashir I.

== Sources ==
Despite its importance, description of the events regarding this war is relatively scarce in Roman and Byzantine sources. In addition, few of the sources are directly from the same period in which this war occurred. It is still uncertain why this war, which led to the loss of much of Roman Mesopotamia, was not properly treated by Roman-Byzantine historians.

== First stage ==
In 237–241 during the reign of Maximinus the Thracian, who succeeded Severus Alexander, the last emperor of the Severan dynasty, the cities of the Roman province of Mesopotamia, Nisibis and Carrhae, were conquered by the Sasanian Empire. Herodian suggested that the Sasanians had remained quiet for three or four years after Severus Alexander's campaigns of 232–233, the outcome of which was inconclusive.

== 238/239 ==
A new large-scale invasion by the Sasanian armies occurred later that year, which laid siege to the fortress-city of Dura Europos, a Roman outpost on the Euphrates River, but it was repulsed by the Romans.

== 240/241 ==
In the course of that year, it appears that Ardashir I finally succeeded in the feat of occupying and destroying the important Roman-allied city-stronghold of Hatra, then occupying much of Roman Mesopotamia (including the legionary fortresses of Rhesaina and Singara as well as the auxiliary fort of Zagurae, today's Ain Sinu), perhaps even going so far as to besiege and occupy Antioch itself, as seems to be suggested by the fact that its mint stopped minting coinage for the years 240 and 241.
