= Siege of Nisibis (237) =

Conflict between Roman and Sasanian forces (237)

- Part of the Second Mesopotamian campaign of Ardashir I
| Date | 237 |
| Location | Nisibis (modern-day Nusaybin, Mardin, Turkey) |
| Result | Sasanian victory |
| Territorial changes | Sasanian forces capture Nisibis. |

Belligerents
| Roman Empire | Sasanian Empire |

Commanders and leaders
| Unknown | Ardashir I Shapur I |

In 224 AD, Ardashir defeated the Parthian Empire and replaced it with the Sasanian Empire. He began to raid Roman territory almost immediately after he had taken power at Ctesiphon. When Severus Alexander launched a massive invasion of the Persian Empire in the early 230s, the Persian forces drove it back inflicting heavy casualties on the Roman army. The Sasanians then besieged the Roman city of Nisibis in 235 or 237 and eventually conquered it.
