= Vologash =

King of Hatra from AD 140 to 180

Wolgash or Vologash

King of Hatra
- Reign: AD 140 – AD 180 (40 years)
- Predecessor: Naṣru
- Successor: Sanatruq I or Abdsamiya
- Father: Naṣru

Wolgash or Vologash (Hatran Aramaic: 𐣥𐣫𐣢𐣴) was a king of Hatra, an ancient city in nowadays Iraq. He is known from more than 20 inscriptions found at Hatra and reigned from about AD 140 to 180. He was the son of Naṣru who reigned from about AD 128 to 140. He was one of the first rulers of Hatra calling himself 𐣬𐣫𐣪 mlk (lit. 'king'), but he bears also the title 𐣬𐣣𐣩𐣠 mryʾ (lit. 'lord'). Both titles are also attested for his brother Sanatruq I. It is unclear whether they both reigned together and took the title king at some point in their reign, or whether Sanatruq succeeded Wolgash. His successor was either his brother or his nephew Abdsamiya.
