= Abdsamiya =

Ruler of Mesopotamian kingdom of Hatra from c. 180 to c. 205

- King (malkā)
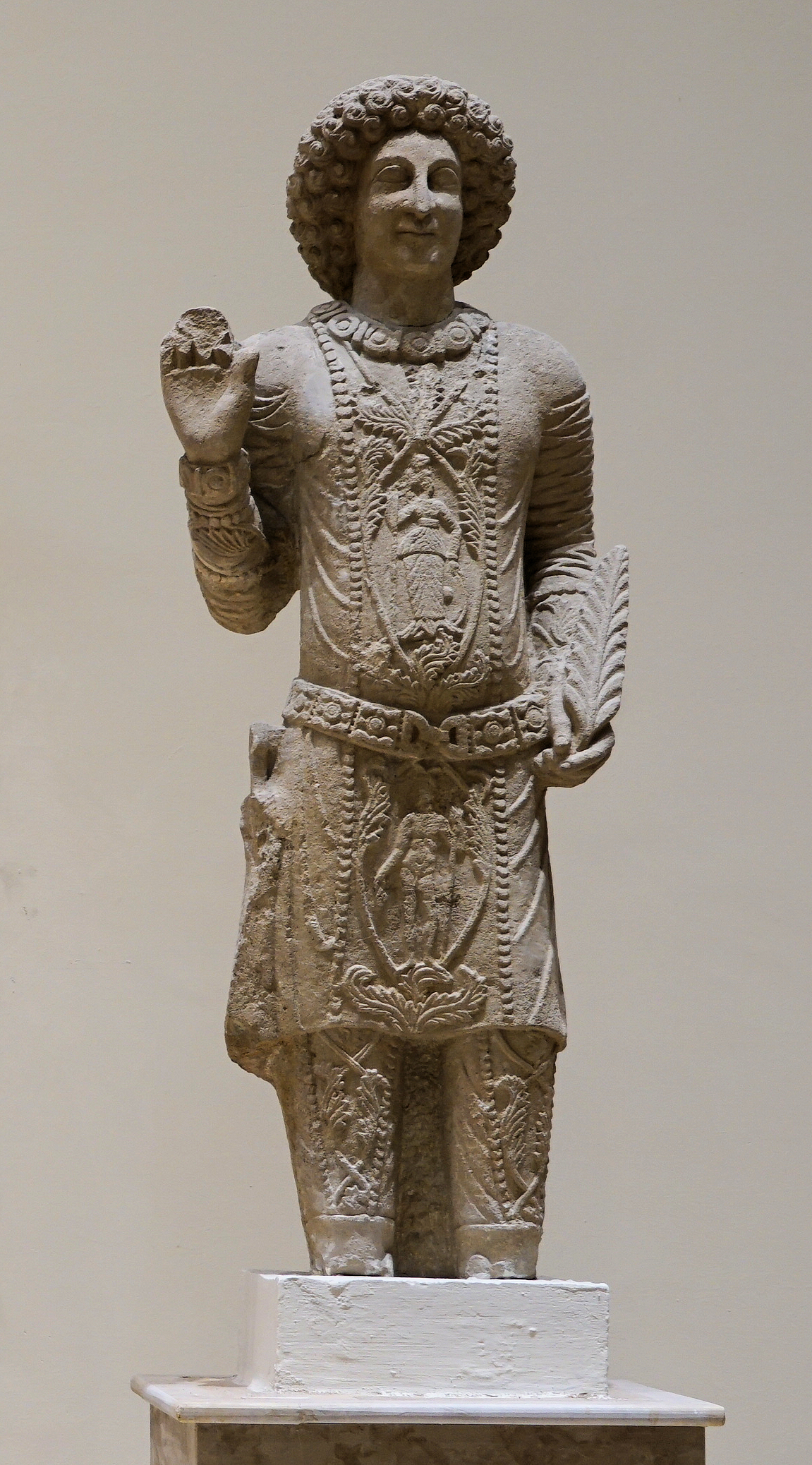
- Absadmiya, son of Sanatruq I, as a young Prince. National Museum of Iraq
- Reign: 180–205 AD
- Predecessor: Sanatruq I
- Successor: Sanatruq II
- Died: c. 205 AD
- Issue: Sanatruq II (son)
- Father: Sanatruq I

Abdsamiya (Hatran Aramaic: 𐣯𐣡𐣣𐣮𐣬𐣩𐣠) was a king of Hatra, an ancient city and kingdom in ancient Mesopotamia. He reigned from about AD 180 to 205. Abdsamiya was the son of king Sanatruq I and the father of Sanatruq II. Abdsamiya is known from eight inscriptions found at Hatra. One of them reports the building of a porticus for the king and is dated to year 504 of the Seleucid era (AD 192/93). Another inscription appears on a statue and is dated to AD 201/202. Abdsamiya is most likely also mentioned by Herodian (3.1.3), where he is named as Barsemias, there he is reported to have supported Pescennius Niger against Septimius Severus in AD 192.

== Literature ==
- Michael Sommer: Hatra. Geschichte und Kultur einer Karawanenstadt im römisch-parthischen Mesopotamien. von Zabern, Mainz 2003, ISBN 3-8053-3252-1, p. 23-24.
