= 231 =

231 in various calendars
Gregorian calendar	231; CCXXXI
Ab urbe condita	984
Assyrian calendar	4981
Balinese saka calendar	152–153
Bengali calendar	−363 – −362
Berber calendar	1181
Buddhist calendar	775
Burmese calendar	−407
Byzantine calendar	5739–5740
Chinese calendar	庚戌年 (Metal Dog); 2928 or 2721 — to — 辛亥年 (Metal Pig); 2929 or 2722
Coptic calendar	−53 – −52
Discordian calendar	1397
Ethiopian calendar	223–224
Hebrew calendar	3991–3992
- Hindu calendars
Vikram Samvat	287–288
Shaka Samvat	152–153
Kali Yuga	3331–3332
Holocene calendar	10231
Iranian calendar	391 BP – 390 BP
Islamic calendar	403 BH – 402 BH
Javanese calendar	109–110
Julian calendar	231; CCXXXI
Korean calendar	2564
Minguo calendar	1681 before ROC 民前1681年
Nanakshahi calendar	−1237
Seleucid era	542/543 AG
Thai solar calendar	773–774
Tibetan calendar	阳金狗年 (male Iron-Dog); 357 or −24 or −796 — to — 阴金猪年 (female Iron-Pig); 358 or −23 or −795

Year 231 (CCXXXI) was a common year starting on Saturday of the Julian calendar. At the time, it was known in Rome as the Year of the Consulship of Claudius and Sallustus (or, less frequently, year 984 Ab urbe condita). The denomination 231 for this year has been used since the early medieval period, when the Anno Domini calendar era became the prevalent method in Europe for naming years.

== Events ==
=== By place ===
==== Roman Empire ====
- Emperor Alexander Severus accompanies his mother Julia Mamaea to Syria, and campaigns against the Persians. Military command rests in the hands of his generals, but his presence gives additional weight to the empire's policy.

==== China ====
- March – August – Battle of Mount Qi: The Chinese state of Shu Han gains a tactical victory, and the state of Cao Wei a strategic victory.

=== By topic ===
==== Religion ====
- Origen, disciple of Ammonius Saccas, founder of Neoplatonism, is exiled in Caesarea.

== Births ==
- Cao Xun, Chinese prince of the Cao Wei state (d. 244)

== Deaths ==
- Cao Zhen, Chinese general of the Cao Wei state
- Li Hui (or De'ang), Chinese official and politician
- Zhang He, Chinese general of the Cao Wei state
