= Sanatruq I =

King of Mesopotamian kingdom of Hatra from c. 140 to c. 180

- Malka
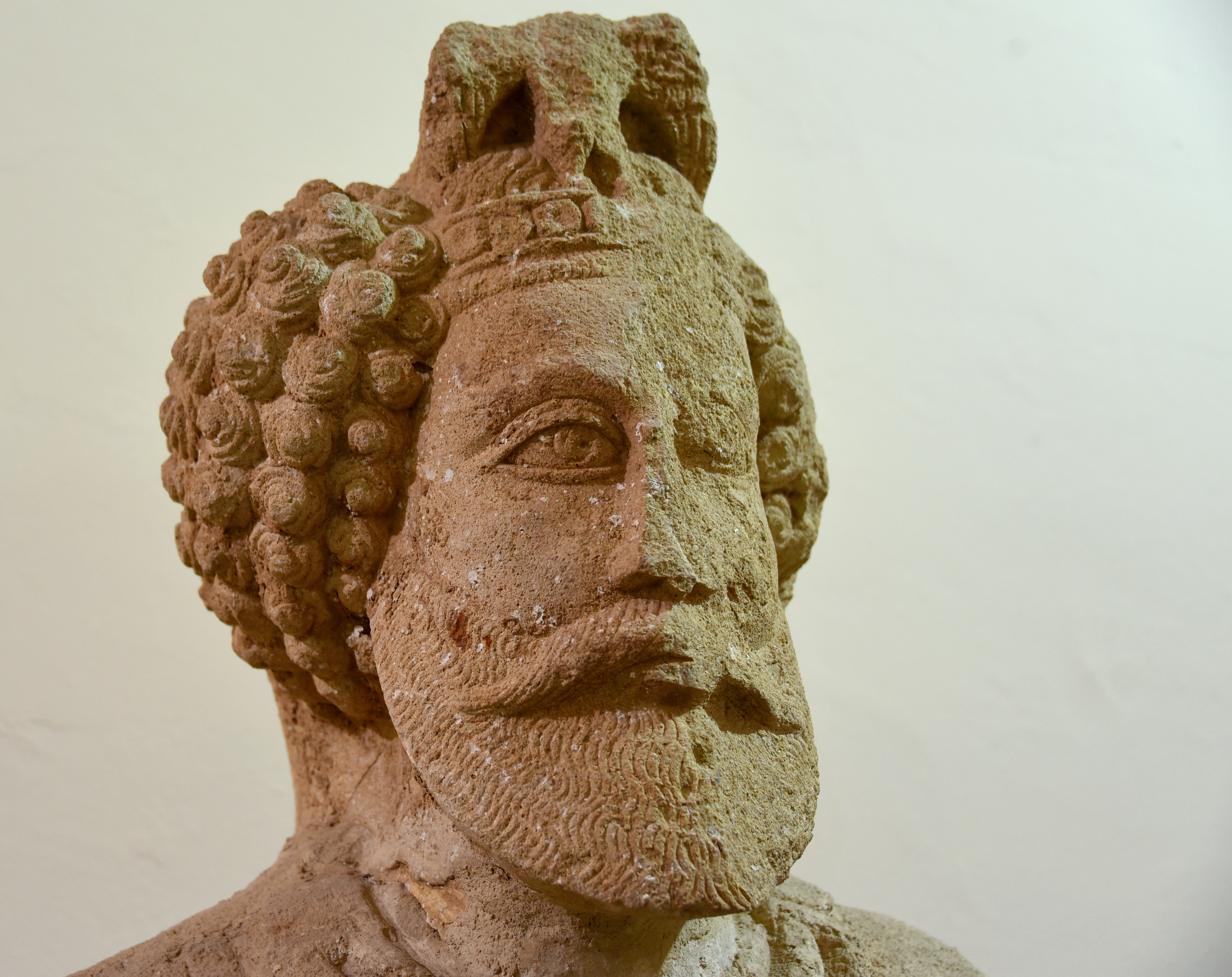
- Statue of Sanatruq I, Erbil Civilization Museum

King of Hatra
- Reign: 140–180
- Predecessor: Naṣru (as governor of Hatra)
- Successor: Abdsamiya
- Died: 180
- Father: Naṣru

Sanatruq I (also spelled Sanatruk I; Hatran Aramaic: 𐣮𐣭𐣨𐣣𐣥𐣲) was the first king of Hatra, an ancient city in northern Mesopotamia (present-day Iraq).

He is known from more than 20 inscriptions found at Hatra and reigned from about 140 to 180. Only one of his inscriptions is dated (year 176/177). He was the son of Naṣru who governed Hatra from about 128 to 140. Sanatruq I was one of the first rulers of Hatra calling himself 𐣬𐣫𐣪 malka (lit. 'king'), but he bears also the title 𐣬𐣣𐣩𐣠 mryʾ (lit. 'administrator'). He was granted the title of king by his Parthian overlord Vologases IV (r. 147–191), due to the increasing strategic importance of the city during that period. Indeed, during the 2nd-century Hatra blossomed, serving as an important religious and commercial centre. The city was well fortified, previously successfully containing the attacks of the Roman emperor Trajan (r. 98–117) thrice. Hatra would remain a dependency of the Parthians until the emergence of the Sasanian Empire in 224.

Both of Sanatruq I's titles are also attested for his brother Wolgash. It is unclear whether they both reigned together and took of the title king of Arabs. Sanatruq I's name (meaning "he who defeats enemies") is of Iranian origin, a typical name used by the royal Parthian family, and a testament to the strong Parthian influence in Hatra. It was most likely under Sanatruq I that the Square Building of Hatra was constructed. The building bears many similarities to the later Sasanian fire temples.

Sanatruq I was succeeded by Abdsamiya. The relation between the two rulers are uncertain; there is no evidence of them being from the same dynasty. Abdsamiya never used the name of his father. However, the name of Abdsamiya's successor was Sanatruq II, which may suggest a continuation of Sanatruq I's line. The Hatran statues commemorating Sanatruq I and his dynasty were not removed, which indicates if a change of dynasty occurred, it was non-violent.

== Sources ==
- de Jong, Albert (2013). "Hatra and the Parthian Commonwealth". Oriens et Occidens – Band 21: 143–161.
- Dijkstra, Klaas (1995). Life and loyalty: a study in the socio-religious culture of Syria and Mesopotamia in the Graeco-Roman period based on epigraphical evidence. Religions in the Graeco-Roman world. Vol. 128. Brill. ISBN 90-04-09996-4.
- Gregoratti, Leonardo (2017). "The Arsacid Empire". In Daryaee, Touraj (ed.). King of the Seven Climes: A History of the Ancient Iranian World (3000 BCE - 651 CE). UCI Jordan Center for Persian Studies. pp. 1–236. ISBN 9780692864401.
- Hovannisian, Richard G.; Sabagh, Georges; Yarshater, Ehsan (1998). The Persian Presence in the Islamic World. Cambridge University Press. pp. 1–267. ISBN 9780521591850.
- Kaizer, Ted; Hekster, Olivier (2011). Frontiers in the Roman World: Proceedings of the Ninth Workshop of the International Network Impact of Empire. Brill. pp. 1–392. ISBN 9789004215030.
- Marcato, Enrico (2018). Personal Names in the Aramaic Inscriptions of Hatra. Digital Publishing. ISBN 9788869692314.
- Moriggi, Marco; Bucci, Ilaria (2019). Aramaic Graffiti from Hatra: A Study Based on the Archive of the Missione Archeologica Italiana. Brill. pp. 1–252. ISBN 9789004397644.
- Sartre, Maurice (2005). The Middle East Under Rome. Harvard University Press. ISBN 9780674016835.
