= Naṣru =

2nd century governor of Hatra in Mesopotamia

Lord of Hatra
- Reign: ca. AD 125 – AD 140
- Predecessor: Nashrihab
- Successor: Vologash
- Issue: Vologash, Sanatruq I
- Father: Nashrihab

Naṣru (Hatran Aramaic: 𐣭𐣱𐣣𐣥) was a local governor at Hatra (an ancient town in the North of modern Iraq). He is attested by at least in 34 inscriptions found in the Hatra. Three of the inscriptions are dated (between AD 128/29 and AD 137/38). A fourth one dates most likely after he died and gives the year 176/177 BC.

During his rule, Nasru took significant measures in fortifying Hatra, such as the construction of the northern and eastern gates and the city wall (as attested to in an Inscription dated to AD 137/138).

Naṣru carried the enigmatic title mry' , which might translate as master, governor or administrator. He was the son of Nashrihab and father of Wolgash and Sanatruq I.

== Literature ==
- Michael Sommer: Hatra. Geschichte und Kultur einer Karawanenstadt im römisch-parthischen Mesopotamien. von Zabern, Mainz 2003, ISBN 3-8053-3252-1, p. 26-27.
