= Profectio =

Ceremonial departure of consul as general in Republican Rome

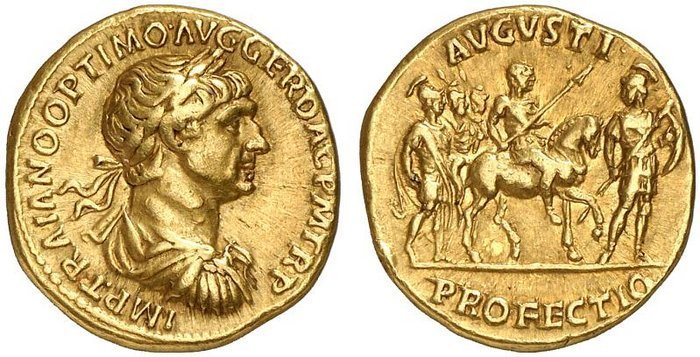
Traianus: aureus
IMP TRAIANO OPTIMO AVG GER DAC P M TR P, Laureate, draped and cuirassed bust of Trajan to right.	PROFECTIO AUGUSTI, Traianus, in military dress and hold spear, on horse walking to right; before him, soldier walking right, head turned back to left; behind, three soldiers walking right.
7,35 g, coined in 114/115.

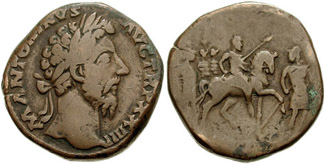
Marcus Aurelius: Sestertius
M ANTONINVS AVG TR P XXIIII, Laureate head right.	Profectio di Marcus Aurelius on horseback right, holding spear, preceded by soldier holding spear and shield; three soldiers follow emperor.
29 mm, 25.04 g, coined in 170

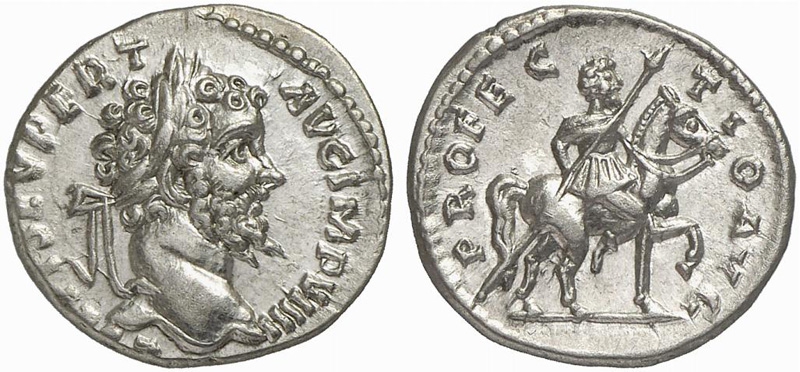
Septimius Severus: denarius
L SEPT SEV PERT AVG IMP VIII, Laureate head of Septimius Severus to right (Paludamentum)	PROFECTIO AUG, Septimius Severus riding horse starts for limes Orientis, holding transverse spear.
2.85 g, coined in 197.

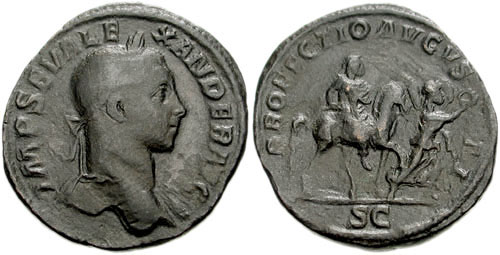
Alexander Severus: sestertius
IMP SEV ALEXANDER AVG, laureate head to right, draped bust;	PROFECTIO AVGVSTI, Alexander Severus on horse, holding transverse spear, preceded by Victoria, with a crown and palm.
coined in 231/232.

The profectio ("setting forth") was the ceremonial departure of a consul in his guise as a general in Republican Rome, and of an emperor during the Imperial era. It was a conventional scene for relief sculpture and imperial coinage. The return was the reditus and the ceremonial reentry the adventus.
