= Nashrihab =

2nd century governor of Hatra in Mesopotamia

Naṣru

Lord of Hatra
- Reign: ca. AD 120 – AD 125
- Predecessor: Elkud
- Successor: Naṣru
- Issue: Naṣru
- Father: Elkud

Nashrihab (Hatran Aramaic: 𐣭𐣴𐣣𐣩𐣤𐣡, romanized: nšryhb) was a local governor at Hatra, an ancient town in modern-day Iraq. Nashrihab is known from many inscriptions of his son Naṣru and ruled from about AD 120 to 125. He was most likely the son of Elkud, who reigned before him.

== Literature ==
- Michael Sommer: Hatra. Geschichte und Kultur einer Karawanenstadt im römisch-parthischen Mesopotamien. von Zabern, Mainz 2003, ISBN 3-8053-3252-1, p. 27.
