= Fall of Hatra =

Capture of Hatra by Sasanians (240-241)

Siege of Hatra
- Part of the Second Mesopotamian campaign of Ardashir I
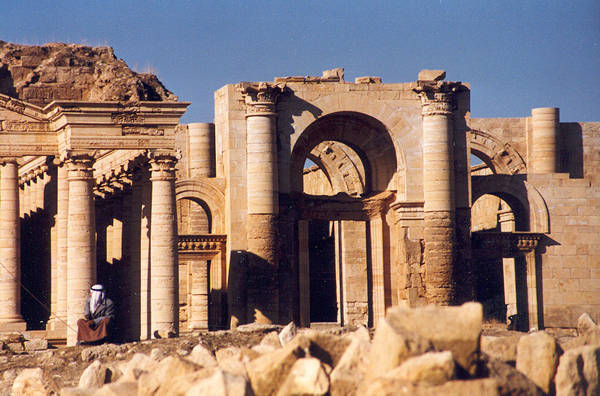
- The ruins of Hatra
Date	AD 240 – April 241
Location	Hatra, northern Mesopotamia 35°35′17″N 42°43′6″E
Result	Sasanian victory
Territorial changes	Kingdom of Hatra dissolved

Belligerents
Sasanian Empire	Kingdom of Hatra; Support: Roman Empire

Commanders and leaders
Ardashir I and/or Shapur I	Sanatruq II †

The fall of Hatra, capital of the Kingdom of Hatra under Sanatruq II, took place in the 3rd century AD after a lengthy siege by the Sasanian king Shapur I. Hatra was plundered and abandoned, and its kingdom dissolved.

== Background ==
During the Roman-Persian Wars, the Kingdom of Hatra was a buffer state between the Roman Empire and the Parthian Empire, and the dynasty was mostly under influence of the latter. Its capital city Hatra was strongly fortified, and managed to repulse sieges by Roman emperors Trajan (in AD 117) and Septimius Severus (in 193 and 197). During the reign of Sanatruq II, the kingdom expanded, and as the Parthian Empire was succeeded by the Sasanian Empire, Hatra shifted its loyalty and became a vassal kingdom of the Romans. The Sasanian king Ardashir I unsuccessfully besieged the city in 220s. Latin dedications from the year 235 in Hatra's ruins suggest there was presence of Roman army in the city in that period.

The siege occurred during a "forgotten" Roman-Persian war at the second half of 230s.

== Siege ==
Modern sources put the date of Hatra's fall in 240–241 (or April 241) per the newly discovered document Cologne Mani Codex (18.2-8), which is the year that Ardashir I crowned his son Shapur I as the co-regent. Either of these may have conquered Hatra. The siege took one year, or two years, according to al-Tabari.

A small Roman garrison was probably stationed in the city, and was most likely destroyed.

After the city's conquest, it was plundered, its fortifications were destroyed, the city was deserted and never resettled, and the Kingdom of Hatra was disestablished. In 363, Ammianus Marcellinus passed by Hatra together with the Roman army and has described it as an "old city situated in an uninhabited area and deserted for a long time past".

== Aftermath ==
The Sasanian capture of Hatra is thought to be the cause of the Persian war of Gordian III.

== Legacy ==
The fall of Hatra is described in medieval Arabic and Persian traditions via stories that mix facts and fiction. The mythical legend tells of the Hatrene princess al-Nadirah who betrayed the city to Shapur I after falling in love with him.
