= Legio IV Italica =

Roman legion

The Legio IV Italica ("Fourth Legion Italian;" also written Legio IIII) was a legion of the Imperial Roman army raised in AD 231 by emperor Alexander Severus. The legion remained in existence as late as AD 400.

== History ==
The legion was raised during the reign of Alexander Severus in 231, with Italian and Pannonian soldiers, and perhaps took soon part in the expedition against the Sassanids in 231–231.

Its first commander was an Equestrian praefectus legionis Maximinus Thrax, the former common soldier and future emperor; reflecting the growing trend of appointed equestrian legati in place of senatorial ones.

The legion participated in all of Maximinus' campaigns in the Danubian area in 235–238. Under Gordian III, it returned to the eastern frontier in 242–244 to fight the Sassanids under the prefect Serapamo, with its base set perhaps in the province of Mesopotamia. Nischer speculates it may have later been based in the Gaul under Diocletian.

The Notitia dignitatum attests the unit as a pseudo-comitatenses legion under the magister militum per Orientem. It perhaps survived until the reformation of Justinian in 545.

== See also ==
- List of Roman legions

== Sources ==
=== Primary sources ===
- Herodian, Storia dell'Impero dopo Marco Aurelio, VI.
- Historia Augusta, "The Two Maximini". Note that the Historia Augusta is a late-4th-century hoax.
- Notitia dignitatum, Orientis.

=== Secondary sources ===
- C. Diehl, Justinienne et la civilisation Byzantine au VI siecle, vol.I, New York 1901.
- Gonzalez, Julio Rodriguez (2003). Historia de las legiones Romanas (in Spanish). Madrid.
- J. Kromayer e G. Veith, Heerwessen und kriegfuhrung die griechen und romer, Munich, 1928.
- E. Luttwak, La grande strategia dell'impero romano, Milan, 1976.
- J. C. Mann, A note on the legion IV Italica, ZPE 126, Bonn.
- E. C. Nischer, The army reforms of Dioclatian and Constantine and their modifications up to the time of the Notitia Dignitatum, Journal of Roman Studies n.13, Londra 1923.
- H. M. D. Parker, "The legions of Diocletian and Constantine", in Journal of Roman Studies 23, 1933, London.
- Ritterling, Emil,
- S. Runciman, La civilizacion bizantina, Madrid 1942.
