= Danaba =

Danaba (Ancient Greek: Δάναβα) was a town and bishopric in the late Roman province of Phoenicia Secunda. Zosimus called it Danabe.

== Location ==
Danaba is mentioned by Ptolemy (V, xv, 24) as a town in the territory of Palmyra. According to the Roman road guide known as Peutinger's table (where it is called Danova) it was a Roman military station between Damascus and Palmyra, twenty miles from Nezala.

Today Danaba may be represented by Hafer, a village five miles southeast of Sadad, which in the early 20th century was in the Ottoman vilayet of Damascus; about 300 Jacobite Syrians lived there, most of whom had been converted to Catholicism. Sadad and Mahïn have also been proposed as its location.

== History ==
Danaba figures in an Antiochene Notitia episcopatuum of the 6th century as a suffragan of Damascus, and remained so till perhaps the 10th century. Only two bishops are known: Theodore, who attended the Council of Chalcedon in 451, and who subscribed the letter of the bishops of the province to Byzantine Emperor Leo I the Thracian in 458 regarding the murder of Proterius of Alexandria, and Eulogius, present at the Second Council of Constantinople in 553.

No longer a residential bishopric, Danaba is included in the Catholic Church's list of titular sees.

== Sources ==
- Herbermann, Charles, ed. (1913). "Danaba". Catholic Encyclopedia. New York: Robert Appleton Company.Danaba is also mentioned in the book of Jasper. It's king was Angius king of Africa in Danaba. Who fought with Sephora, son of Eliphaze, son of Essau.
