= Sanatruq II =

Ruler of Mesopotamian kingdom of Hatra from c. 205 to 241

- King (malkā)
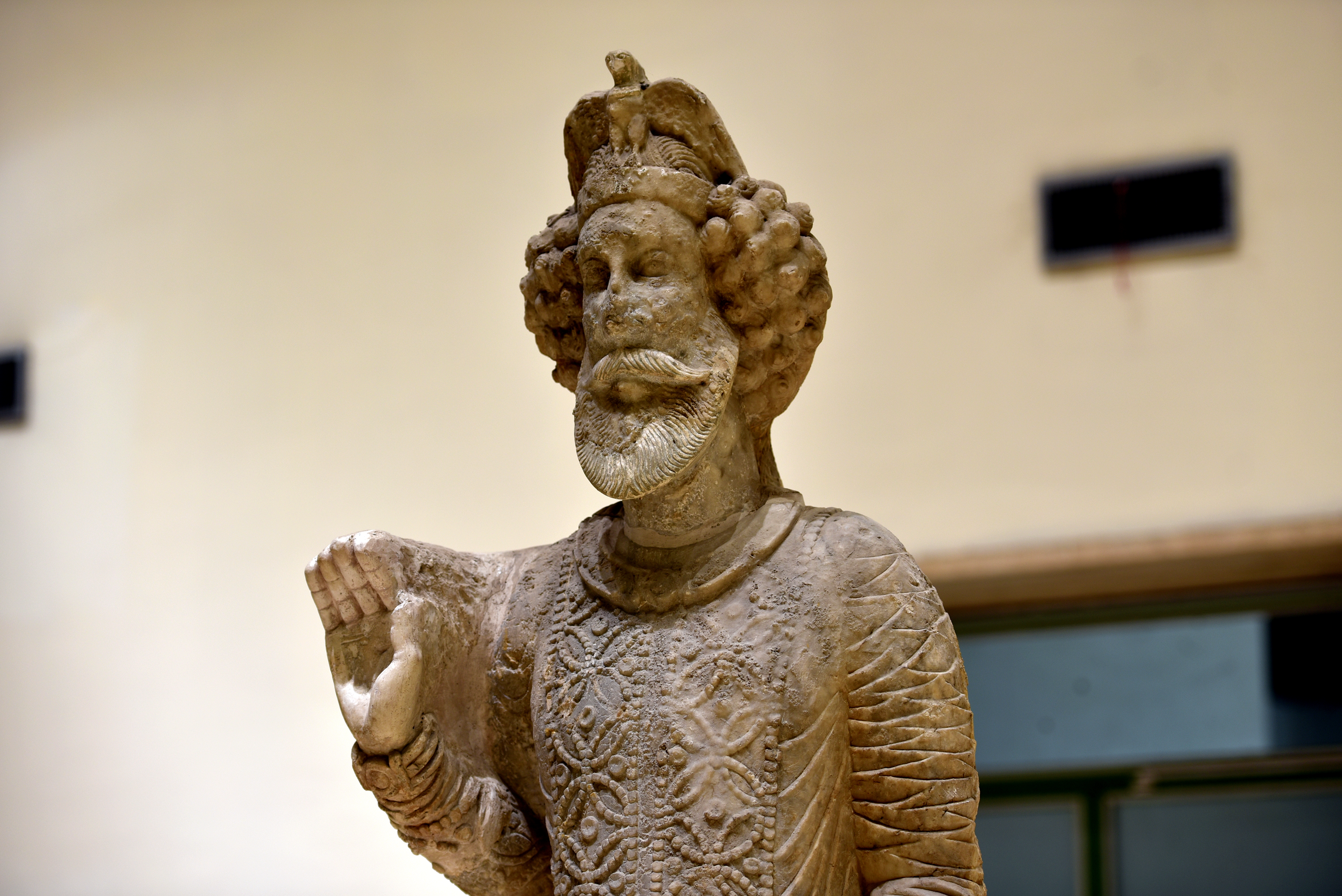
- Statue of Sanatruq I or Sanatruq II, king of Hatra, Iraq Museum.
- Tenure: c. 205 – April 241 AD
- Predecessor: Abdsamiya
- Heir: Abdsamiya II
- Born: Hatra
- Died: 241 AD; Hatra
- Queen: possibly Abbu
- Issue: Abdsamiya (son); Mana (son); Duspari (daughter); Samay (daughter); al-Nadirah (daughter, per tradition)
Posthumous name
- al-Dayzan (Arabic: الضيزن); Satirun (Arabic: ساطرون); Ta'ir (Persian: طائر; Shahnama)
- Father: Abdsamiya

Sanatruq II (Hatran Aramaic: 𐣮𐣭𐣨𐣣𐣥𐣲, romanized: snṭrwq) was the last king of Hatra (an ancient city in modern-day Iraq), ruling from about AD 205 to 240/41. He was the son of king Abdsamiya and is attested by nine inscriptions discovered at Hatra. Only two of these inscriptions bear year datings, both are hard to read.(perhaps 231 and 237/38) Sanatruq II appears in Syrian sources as Sanatru and in Arab sources as Daizian and Satirun. One of his inscriptions was found on a statue showing him standing. His wife was perhaps Abbu. There are two sons known. Abdsamiya was named after his grandfather. He was his heir. Another son, Mana is attested in year 235 and seems to have had Arabia of Wal under his control, a region southeast of Edessa. From the latter evidence it seems that Sanatruq II expanded his territory. The daughter Duspari is known from a statue, dated to year 549 (= AD 238). A second statue belongs to her daughter Samay.

Under Sanatruq II Hatra became a vassal of the Romans. Around AD 226/227 the Sasanians attacked the city without success, but it was finally conquered and destroyed by the Sasanian forces, perhaps around AD 240/41.

== See also ==
- Al-Nadirah
- Fall of Hatra

== Literature ==
- Michael Sommer: Hatra. Geschichte und Kultur einer Karawanenstadt im römisch-parthischen Mesopotamien. von Zabern, Mainz 2003, ISBN 3-8053-3252-1, p. 24.
- Maurice Sartre: The Middle East under the Romans, 2005 ISBN 978-0-674-01683-5, p. 346
